= Pervâneoğlu =

Dynasty in northern Anatolia from 1261 to 1326

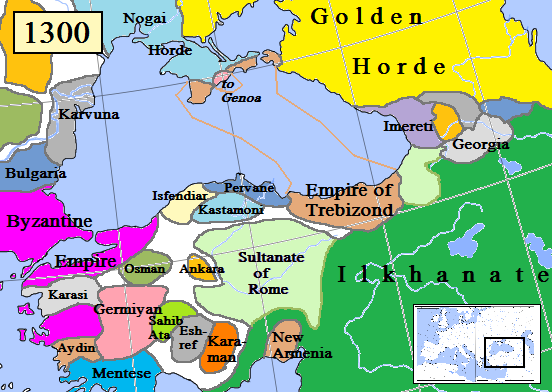
The Beylik of Pervane (dark blue) in 1300.

Pervâneoğlu (in Turkish plural Pervâneoğulları, 'sons of the pervâne') or Beylik of Sinop was an Anatolian beylik that existed between the second half of the 13th century and the beginning of the 14th (1261–1326).

The beylik was founded by Mu'in al-Din, Seljuk pervâne of Persian origin. His grandson Gazi Çelebi, the last Bey of Pervane, transformed his realm into a serious regional naval power, conducting raids against Genoese possessions in the Black Sea and Crimea, as well as against the Empire of Trebizond. Having no sons, Gazi Çelebi bequeathed his lands to the Candarids.

== Rulers ==
Bey	Reign
Muînüddin Mehmed	1277–1297
Mühezzebüddin Mesud	1297–1300
Gazi Çelebi	1300–1322

== See also ==
- List of Sunni Muslim dynasties
