= Alaaddin Mosque, Sinop =

Mosque in Sinop, Turkey

Alaaddin Mosque (Sinop Ulucami)
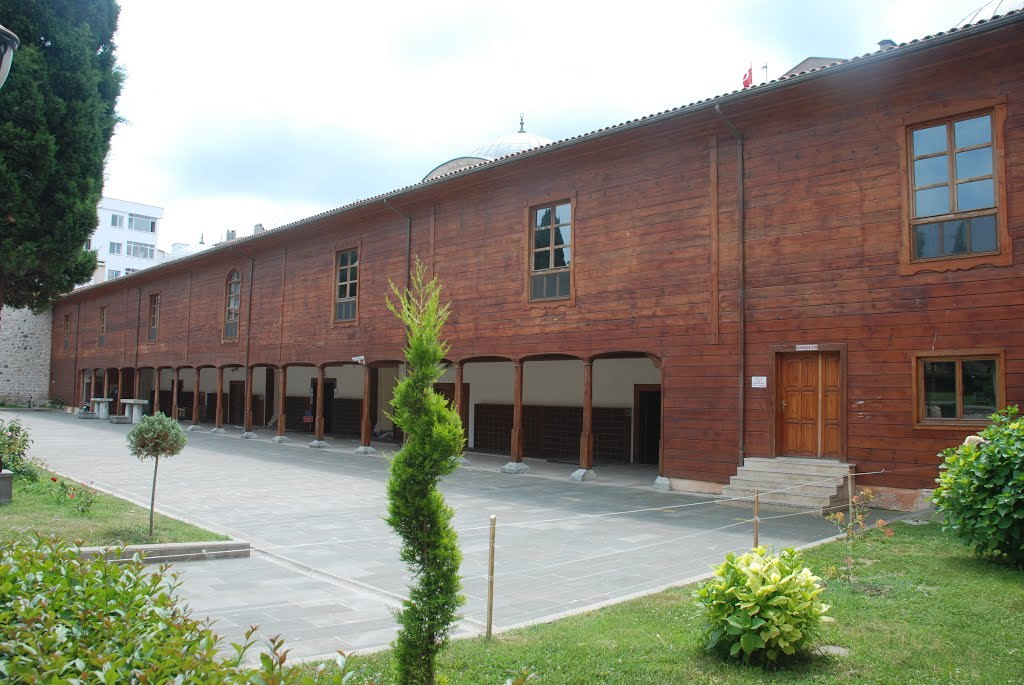

Religion
- Affiliation: Islam
- Province: Sinop Province
- Region: Black Sea Region
- Rite: Sunni Islam
- Status: Active

Location
- Location: Sinop, Turkey
- Interactive map of Alaaddin Mosque (Sinop Ulucami)
- Coordinates: 42°01′35″N 35°08′54″E

Architecture
- Type: Mosque
- Completed: 1220s (original); 1267 (rebuilt)

Specifications
- Width (nave): 66 meters
- Dome: 3 (main) +2 (smaller)
- Minaret: 1

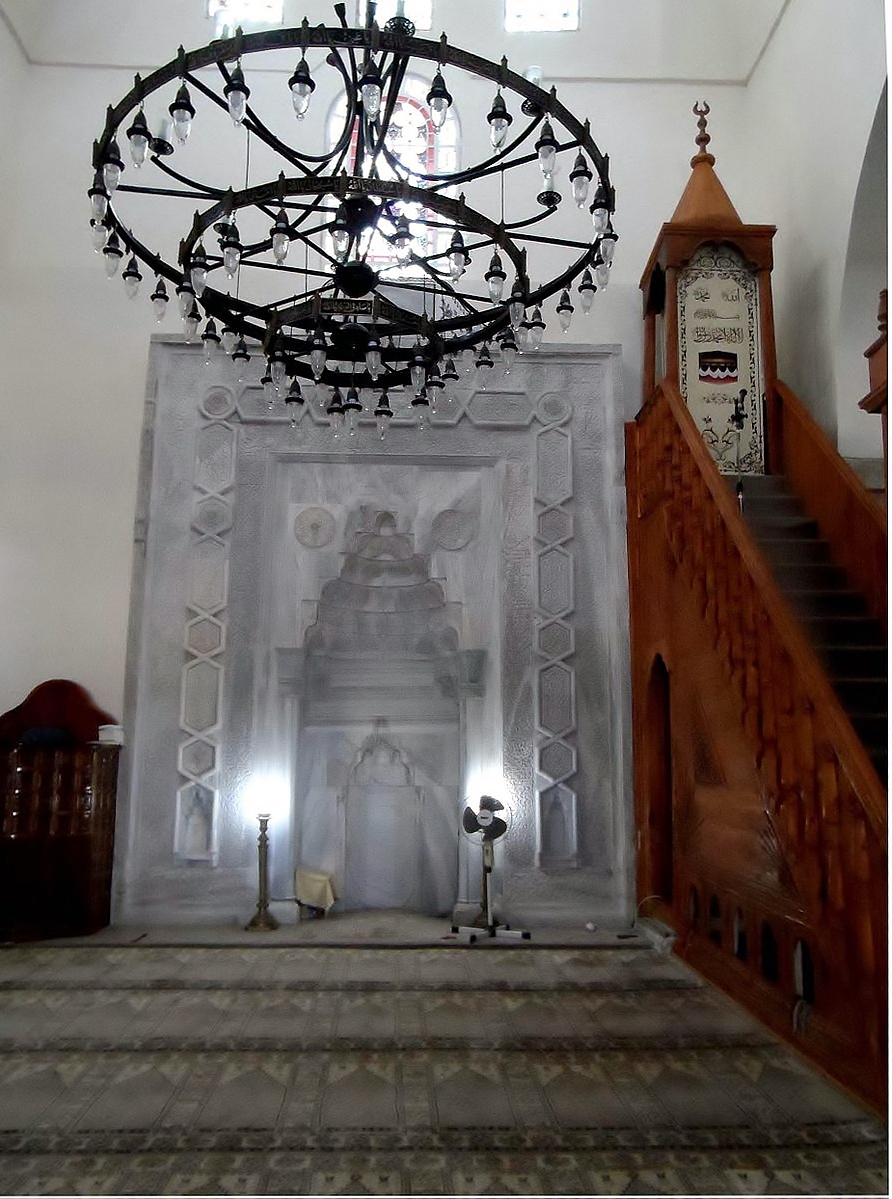
Minbar (right) and Mihrab (left) of Alaaddin Mosque in Sinop.

Alaaddin Mosque (Turkish: Alâeddin Camii) is a historic mosque in Sinop City, Sinop Province, Turkey.

== Geography ==
The mosque is located in the center of the Sinop peninsula. Another historical building, the Pervane Medrese is to the north of the mosque.

== History ==
Sinop was an important Black Sea port during the Middle Ages. It was captured by Kaykaus I of Seljuks in 1214. The mosque was commissioned by his brother Alaattin Keykubat I in the 1220s. The trustee of the mosque building was Atabeg Esedüddin Ayas, the former Artuqid (an Anatolian beylik) bey, who escaped from his beylik after a coup d'état and took refuge with the Seljuks. But after Manuel I of Trebizond captured Sinop, most of the mosque was demolished. Turkish control was restored in 1264 and Seljuks vizier Pervâne rebuilt the mosque in 1267. The city fell under the rule of the Candar dynasty and during the 1340s İbrahim of Candar built a tomb in the northeast corner of the mosque's courtyard. In 1385 Celaleddin Bayezid of Candar enlarged the mosque. Sinop as well as the rest of the Candar dominions were incorporated into the Ottoman Empire in 1461. During Ottoman rule the mosque underwent restoration on several occasions. During the 1850s, Tufan Pasha, the Ottoman governor of Sinop restored the mosque following an earthquake which caused damage to the dome. The most recent restoration of the mosque took place in 2008.

== Building ==
The total area of the mosque is square where the building has 66 x 22 m^{2} (216 x 72 ft^{2}) base area and the yard has 66 x 44 m^{2} (216 x 144 ft^{2}) area. The rectangular plan of the mosque building is quite different from later Ottoman mosques. The mosque yard is encircled by 12 metres (39 ft) high walls. There are three gates; at the west, at the north and at the east. Shadirvan, the ablution fountain (a must for a mosque) is in the center of the yard. The mosque has three main domes and two smaller domes. During the restoration in the 1860s, the original marble mimbar of the mosque had been sent to Istanbul. The present wooden mimbar is a later addition.
