= Suleiman I of Candar =

Bey of Candar from 1309 to 1340

Suleiman I
- Sultānu'l-a'zam (Note: lit. 'The Great Sultan')

Bey of Candar
- Reign: 1309–1340
- Predecessor: Yaman Candar
- Successor: Ibrahim I
- Died: 1340
- Issue: Ibrahim; Ali; Choban
- Dynasty: Candar
- Father: Yaman Candar
- Religion: Islam

Shuja' al-Din Suleiman I Pasha (Medieval Greek: Σολυμάμπαξι, romanized: Solimámpaxi; died 1340) was Bey of Candar from 1309 until his death. He was the son of Shams al-Din Yaman, who defeated the governor of Kastamonu, Yavlak Arslan, and was granted administration of the region by Ilkhan Gaykhatu (r. 1291–1295). However, after Yaman's death, it came under the control of its former ruler's son, Mahmud. On 16 July 1309, Suleiman took Kastamonu and reigned under the suzerainty of the Ilkhanate until the death of the last Ilkhan Abu Sa'id (r. 1316–1335). Suleiman declared independence in 1327 and started issuing his own coins in 1335. He maintained stable relations with his neighbors but continued to raid the Byzantine Empire despite an offer of peace. He intended to hand the rule over to his youngest son Choban, which elicited a revolt from Suleiman’s oldest son Ibrahim, who instead became his successor.

== Background ==
During Sultan of Rum Mesud II's first reign (r. 1284–1297), his brother Kilij Arslan arrived in Sinop from Crimea. Kilij Arslan declared himself the ruler and appointed the governor of Kastamonu, Yavlak Arslan, as his atabeg (vassal). Mesud marched on his brother with Mongol support but was defeated and caught. Suleiman's father, Shams al-Din Yaman, of the Oghuz Turkic Candar dynasty, rescued Mesud in a clash that killed Yavlak Arslan. Yaman was then granted control of Kastamonu by Ilkhan Gaykhatu (r. 1291–1295).

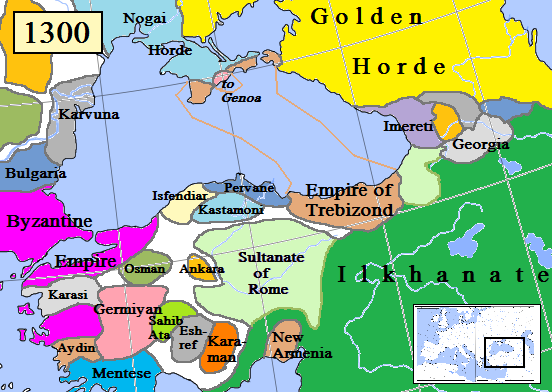
Anatolia, c. 1300

== Reign ==
Upon the death of Yaman, Suleiman's father, Kastamonu came into the hands of Yavlak Arslan's son, Mahmud, the head of the Chobanids (r. 1292–1309), forcing Suleiman to retreat west to Eflani. On 16 July 1309, Suleiman led an unexpected attack on Kastamonu, killing Mahmud and claiming the city as his capital. Suleiman reigned under the suzerainty of the Ilkhanate until the demise of its last ruler, Ilkhan Abu Sa'id (r. 1316–1335). When the Ilkhanid influence in the region first started to wane, Suleiman pledged allegiance to the governor and vizier Chupan, which allowed him to expand the boundaries of his realm. Suleiman vassalized Ghazi Chelebi of Sinop in the north, after whose death in 1322 he assumed direct control of the city and trusted his elder son Ibrahim with its administration. Sinop's annexation opened up trade with the Republic of Genoa. Suleiman additionally seized Safranbolu in the west and granted its rule to his son Ali. He declared independence in 1327. From 1335 to his death, Suleiman minted coins in his name instead of the Ilkhanate, assuming the title Sultānu'l-a'zam (the Great Sultan). Suleiman maintained stable relations with his neighbors such as the Byzantine Empire, Ottoman Sultanate, and the Beylik of Tadjeddin as he did not attempt to expand in the direction of south and west. However, he persisted in raiding and besieging Byzantine territory despite a peace offer.

Suleiman had a close relationship with the family of the famous Sufi scholar and poet Rumi. He was visited by Rumi's grandson Ulu Arif Chelebi twice in an attempt to reduce the influence Rafidi sheikhs had over uch beys (minor rulers on the Byzantine frontier) like Suleiman.

According to the contemporary Maghrebi traveler Ibn Battuta, who visited Safranbolu and Kastamonu in 1331–1332, Suleiman frequently consulted with the pious and faqihs (Islamic jurists) and was "long-bearded, good-humored, graceful, and formidable," as relayed by modern historian İsmail Hakkı Uzunçarşılı. Suleiman gifted Ibn Battuta clothes and a horse from a good breed. In his works Masālik al-abṣār and at-Taʾrīf, historian Ibn Fadlallah al-Umari, who was Suleiman's contemporary, wrote that he ruled over forty cities and castles and had 25,000–30,000 cavalry under his command. Al-Umari attested to amicable diplomatic relations between Suleiman and the Mamluk Sultanate that ruled over Egypt and Syria. He mentioned that quality horses and hawks were raised in Suleiman's realm. Suleiman was also touched on by various other contemporary historians, Abulfeda and Pachymeres, who referred to him as Solimámpaxi (Σολυμάμπαξι) in Greek. Moreover, contemporary poet Qutb al-Din al-Shirazi authored the Persian work Intihab-i Suleimāni dedicated to him in July 1309, when Suleiman had recently conquered Kastamonu. In 1329, Suleiman ordered the reparation of a madrasa that was initially built in the name of Yavlak Arslan in Taşköprü. Overall, Suleiman's realm was presumably likely economically strong and bureaucratically advanced.

When Suleiman designated his youngest son Choban as his heir, his older son Ibrahim rebelled in or shortly after 1339 and captured Kastamonu, declaring himself as the new ruler. According to historian Yaşar Yücel, Suleiman likely died in 1341. However, the colophon of an illuminated copy of Rumi's Divan-i Kabir commissioned by his son Ibrahim, dating back to 19 March 1340, referred to Suleiman as al-amir al-marhum (the deceased emir), which demonstrates Suleiman died before that date. He was over eighty years in age at his death based on Ibn Battuta's earlier description of him as about seventy years old. Neither Suleiman's death cause nor Choban's fate is known. Uzunçarşılı proposes that his grave was located in the lodge of the Mevlevi Sufi order (mevlevihane) of Kastamonu as indicated by an inscription there before the grave was removed.

== Bibliography ==
- Jackson, Cailah (2 May 2024). Mevlevi Manuscripts, 1268–c. 1400: A Study of the Sources. Springer Nature Switzerland. ISBN 9783031483677. OCLC 1402246241.
- Mordtmann, J. H. (1978). "Isfendiyār Og̲h̲lu". In van Donzel, E.; Lewis, B.; Pellat, Ch. & Bosworth, C. E. (eds.). The Encyclopaedia of Islam, Second Edition. Volume IV: Iran–Kha. Leiden: E. J. Brill. ISBN 978-90-04-05745-6. OCLC 758278456.
- Reinert, Stepen W. (2019). "İsfendiyaroğulları (Candaroğulları)". In Fleet, Kate; Krämer, Gudrun; Matringe, Denis; Nawas, John; Rowson, Everett (eds.). Encyclopaedia of Islam (3rd ed.). Brill Online. doi:10.1163/1573-3912_ei3_COM_32548. ISSN 1873-9830.
- Uzunçarşılı, İsmail Hakkı (1969). Anadolu Beylikleri Ve Akkoyunlu, Karakoyunlu Devletleri [Anatolian Beyliks and Aq Qoyunlu, Qara Qoyunlu States] (in Turkish). Turkish Historical Society Press. ISBN 9751624576. OCLC 563553149.
- Yücel, Yaşar (1993). "Candaroğulları". TDV Encyclopedia of Islam, Vol. 7 (Ca'fer es-Sâdik – Ci̇ltçi̇li̇k) (in Turkish). Istanbul: Presidency of Religious Affairs, Centre for Islamic Studies. pp. 146–149. ISBN 978-975-389-434-0.

Regnal titles
Preceded by Yaman Candar	Bey of Candar; 1309–1340	Succeeded by Ibrahim I
