= Ibrahim I of Candar =

Bey of Candar from 1341 to 1346

Ibrahim I
- Emīru'l-muazzam sāhibu'l-ilm wa'l-kalem wa's-sayf

Bey of Candar
- Reign: 1341–1346
- Predecessor: Suleiman I
- Successor: Yakub or Adil
- Died: Unknown
- Dynasty: Candar
- Father: Suleiman I
- Religion: Islam

Ghiyath al-Din Ibrahim I Shah was Bey of Candar from 1341 to 1346. During the reign of his father, Suleiman I, he was trusted with the administration of Sinop. He took control upon his father's death, who had instead designated Ibrahim's youngest brother, Choban, as his heir. Ibrahim commissioned the production of an illuminated copy of Rumi's Divan-i Kabir in Konya dated 19 March 1340.

In 1341, Ibrahim captured about ten Genoese vessels after a skirmish with the Republic of Genoa, who had a trading post near Sinop. He was possibly succeeded by his uncle, Yakub. However, nothing is known about Yakub's reign, and his son and Ibrahim's cousin, Adil, is known to have risen to the throne in 1346.

== Bibliography ==
- Jackson, Cailah (2 May 2024). Mevlevi Manuscripts, 1268–c. 1400: A Study of the Sources. Springer Nature Switzerland. ISBN 9783031483677. OCLC 1402246241.
- Uzunçarşılı, İsmail Hakkı (1969). Anadolu Beylikleri Ve Akkoyunlu, Karakoyunlu Devletleri [Anatolian Beyliks and Aq Qoyunlu, Qara Qoyunlu States] (in Turkish). Turkish Historical Society Press.
- Yücel, Yaşar (1993). "Candaroğulları". TDV Encyclopedia of Islam, Vol. 7 (Ca'fer es-Sâdik – Ci̇ltçi̇li̇k) (in Turkish). Istanbul: Presidency of Religious Affairs, Centre for Islamic Studies. pp. 146–149. ISBN 978-975-389-434-0.

Regnal titles
Preceded by Suleiman I	Bey of Candar; 1341–1346	Succeeded by Yakub or Adil
