= Pervane Medrese =

Madrasa in Sinop, Turkey

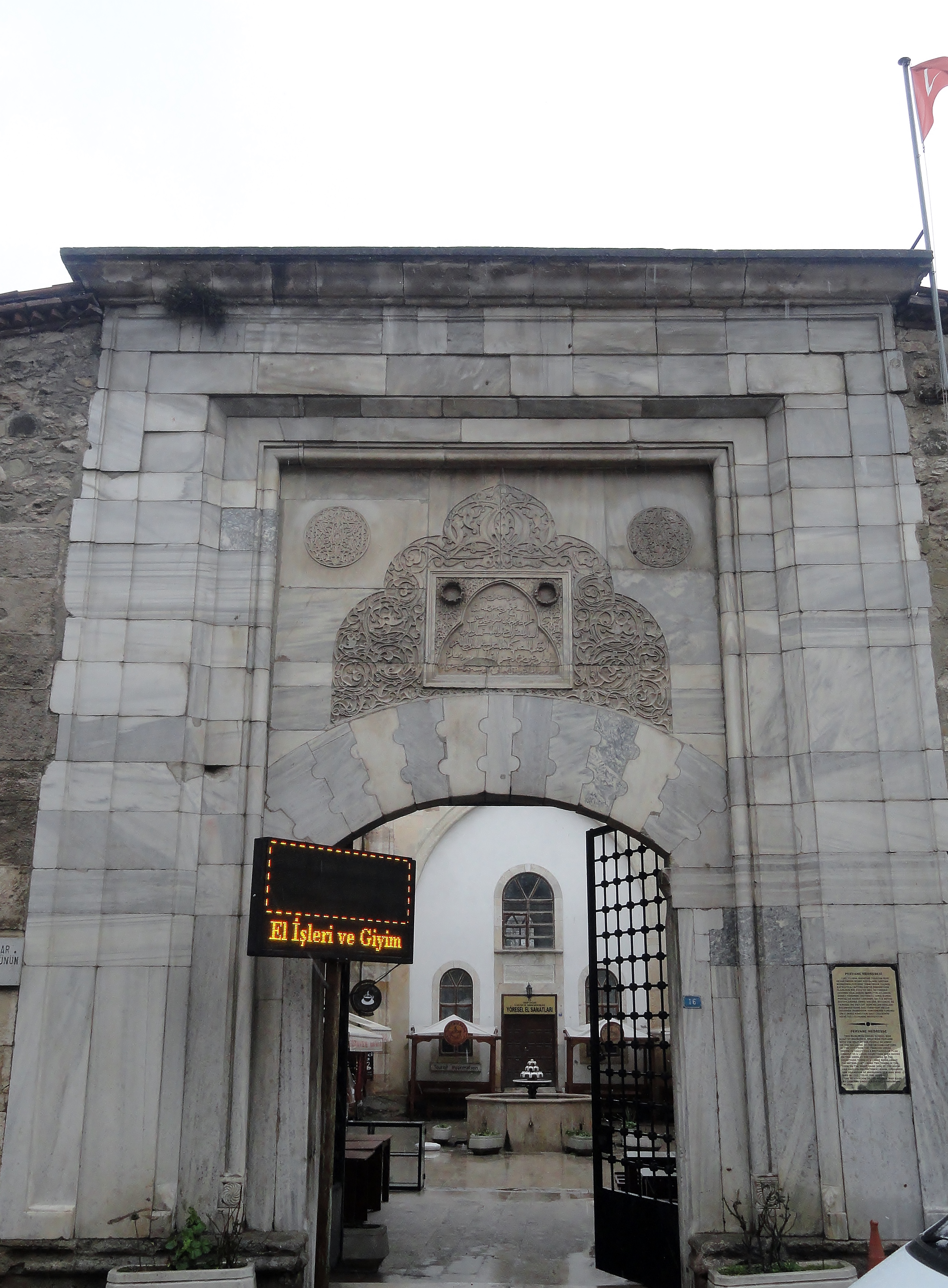
- Main gate of Pervane Medrese in Sinop, Turkey

- Location of Pervane Medrese in Turkey, Sinop

Religion
- Affiliation: Islam
- Region: Black Sea Region
- Year consecrated: 1265

Location
- Location: Sinop, Turkey
- Coordinates: 42.02693°N 35.14831°E

Architecture
- Type: Madrasa

Specifications
- Length: 38 m (125 ft)
- Width: 28 m (92 ft)

Pervane Medrese (Turkish: Pervane Medresesi) is a historic madrasa, an Islamic school, in Sinop, Turkey.

It is situated in the center of the Sinop Peninsula. Another historical building, the Alaaddin Mosque is to the south of the madrasa, across the road between the two.

== Background ==
Mu'in al-Din Sulaiman Parwana, better known as Pervâne, was a vizier during the dissolution period of the Anatolian Seljuks in the second half of the 13th century. In 1262, he recaptured Sinop from the Trebizond Empire. The sultan granted Sinop to Pervane as an iqta, a fief. Although a vassal of the Seljuks, Pervane became de facto ruler of Sinop. He built the madrasa in 1265. After Perwana, the madrasa was used during the Candar beylik and Ottoman Empire. After the proclamation of the Turkish Republic, madrasas were replaced by modern schools, and the Pervane Medrese was closed. From 1932 on, the madrasa building was used as a depot for archaeological artifacts and ethnographical items collected since 1921. It was established as a museum in 1941, and continued as such until 1970 when the museum was moved to its new building. In 2002, the building was handed over to Sinop governorship. It is now used as a souvenir shop bazaar.

== Architecture ==
The building with the dimensions 38 m × 28 m (125 ft × 92 ft) lies in a north to south direction. A marble portal is the main entrance in the south. There are two rooms on each side of the portal. Five student cells each are situated on either side of the building. In the courtyard, there is a fountain. The tombs of an admiral (Gazi Chelebi) and his daughter are also at the madrasa.
