= Sinop Archaeological Museum =

- Sinop Arkeoloji Müzesi
- Location od Sinop Museum in Turkey
- Established: 1941; 85 years ago
- Location: Okullar Cad. 2, Sinop
- Coordinates: 42°01′39″N 35°09′06″E
- Type: Archaeology museum
- Website: www.sinopmuzesi.gov.tr

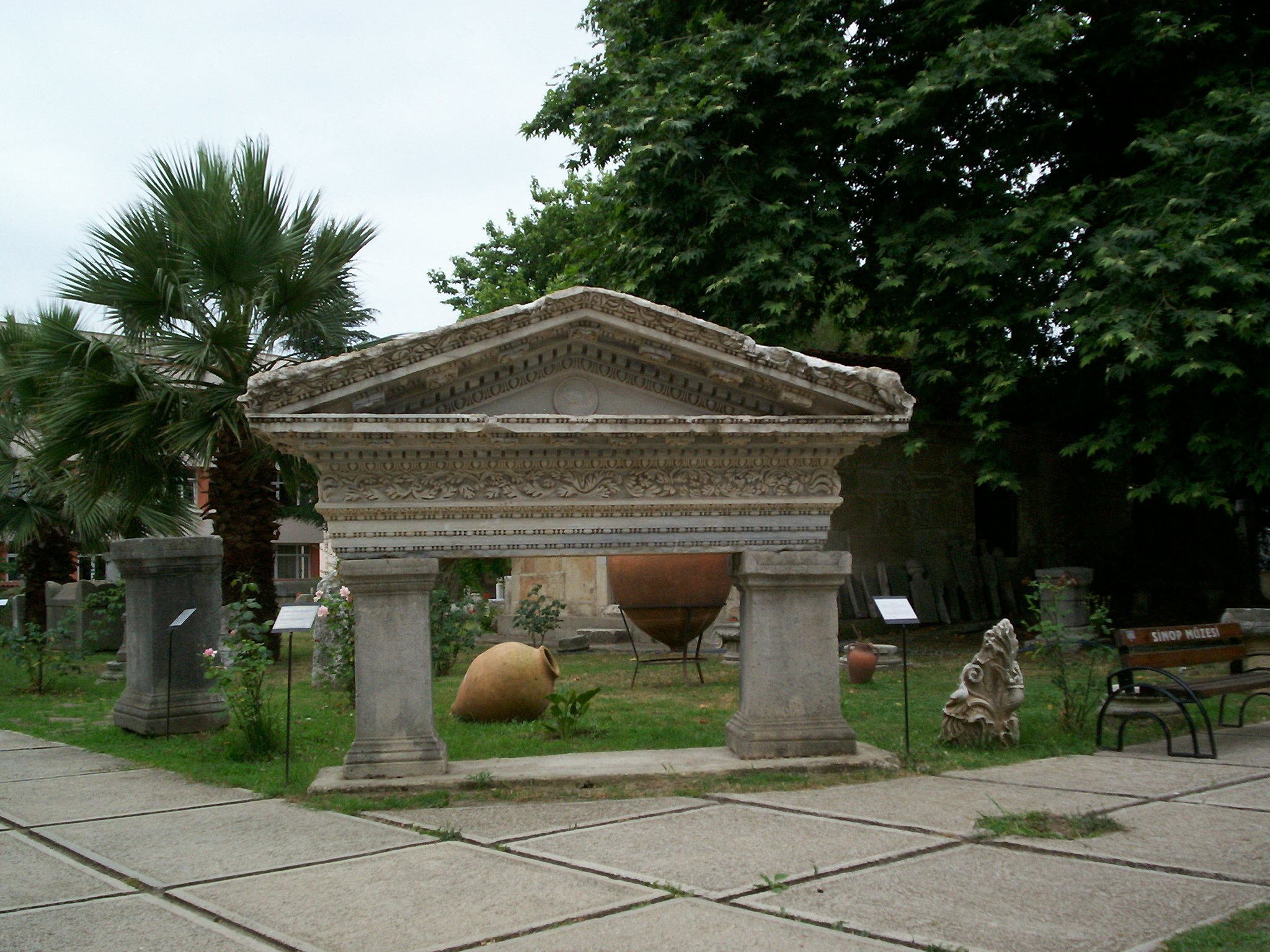
An open-air exhibit from Roman Empire era in the museum yard.

Sinop Archaeological Museum, or Sinop Museum (Turkish: Sinop Arkeoloji Müzesi or Sinop Müzesi), is a national museum in Sinop, Turkey, exhibiting archaeological artifacts found in and around the city.

== Background ==
One of the earliest museum activities in Turkey began in 1921, in Sinop. Artifacts and other objects of historical and cultural importance, found at different locations in the city, were initially conserved in a high school (Ottoman Turkish: Mekteb-i İdadi) building. In 1932, the items were transferred to the Pervane Medrese, a former religious school, where they formed the core of the Sinop Museum. The building was established as a museum and opened to the public in 1941. In 1947, a museum director was assigned to the site.

A joint team of German and Turkish archaeologists, led by Ludwig Budde and Ekrem Akurgal, carried out excavations in the center of Sinop and at Kocagöz Tumulis in Demirciköy between 1951 and 1953. Akurgal proposed the construction of a special museum building in Sinop to hold the numerous artifacts. In 1968, the city municipality donated property in downtown Sinop, which incorporated a Seljuk Empire-era tomb and the ruins of a Serapeum uncovered during the excavations.

The two-storey museum building, which is located in Okullar Cad. 2, in the center of Sinop, was completed in 1970. A building renovation in 2001 allowed the museum to incorporate modern museology concepts. It re-opened in April 2006.

== Museum exhibits ==
=== Open-air section ===
The ruin of a Serapeum, a temple dedicated to the combined Hellenistic-Ancient Egyptian deity Serapis, is situated in the southwestern corner of the open-air museum section. It was unearthed, on-site, during excavations in 1951. Inside the rectangular temple ruin, terracotta artifacts, architectural elements and figures of Serapis, Dionysus, Heracles, Isis and Kore were found. An inscription indicates that it was dedicated to Serapis, though the date of the edifice is unknown.

The Sultana's Tomb (Turkish: Sultan Hatun Türbesi), also in the museum yard, is known locally as the "Aynalı Kadın Türbesi", (literally: "Tomb of the Lady with Mirror"). According to an inscription above the tomb's arched gate, it was constructed in June 1395. It contains three sarcophagi, including one belonging to a daughter of Süleyman Pasha. Pasha was the eldest son of Orhan I, the second bey of the newly established Ottoman Empire. His daughter, who died in 1395, was the spouse of Candaroğlu bey Süleyman Pasha. The square-plan tomb is constructed of ashlar. It is topped with a wooden roof covered with Turkish tiles instead of a dome, compared with buildings of that era, and has windows on three sides.

Other exhibits, including architectural elements, milestones, headstones, sculptures made of stone or marble, large earthenware jars and mosaics, are on display in the northern part of the yard. Islamic headstones erected to the south and west of the Sultana's Tomb give the impression of a cemetery.

=== Indoor exhibits ===
The hallway off of the entrance contains sculptures and busts. A stone inscription featuring an agreement signed between Sinope and Heraclea Pontica (today: Karadeniz Ereğli) in 4th-century BC is also exhibited here.

The small artifacts room features utensils, metallic tools, vases, terracotta figurines and architectural elements from the Serapeum, and glassware and artifacts from graves, all displayed in chronological order from the Early Bronze Age (3300–2100 BC) to the end of the Byzantine Empire (1453). A mosaic panel depicting seven muses of the arts, uncovered at excavations in Sinop's Meydankapı neighborhood, decorates the center of this section's floor.

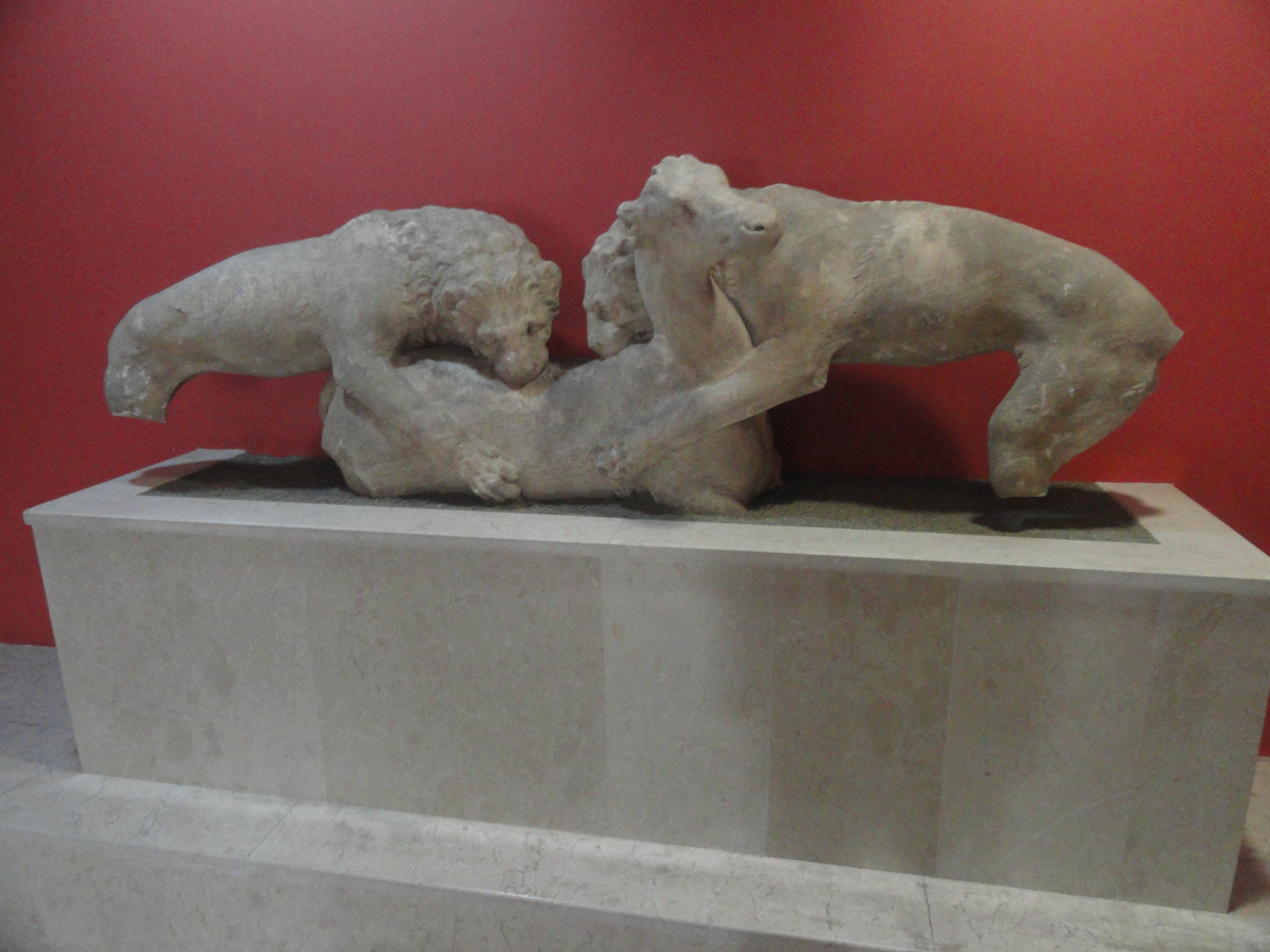
Marble sculpture of two lions savaging a deer from the 4th-century BC.

The stone works hall, reserved for the veneration of the dead, contains examples of the oldest steles from the Archaic period in Anatolia. A marble sculpture depicting two lions savaging a deer, and a sarcophagus of a seaman are on display in this hall.

In the coinage section, the collection features examples of the first silver coins minted in Sinop, city coins, and coins from the treasures of Ordu and Gelincik, as well as Byzantine and Seljuk coinage are on display.

The icon hall contains icons from Eastern Orthodox churches of Byzantine-era Sinop. The icons were painted and gilded fresco on plastered cloth or chestnut wood panel. They are similar to icons found in the churches of Russia and Cyprus.

==== Amphora hall ====
During the French-Turkish excavation carried out between 1994 and 2000 in the center, Karakum and Demirciköy areas of Sinop, many amphora-manufacturing workshops and furnaces were unearthed. The findings revealed that the manufacturing of amphora, brick and roof tile was the main economic sector of Sinop in the Hellenistic, Roman and Byzantine periods. Amphora from these excavations are exhibited in the amphora hall, as well as a replica of an amphora furnace, and a map showing the commercial distribution area of amphora from Sinop.

== Access ==
The museum is located in Okullar Cad. 2, in the center of Sinop. It is open everyday, except Mondays, between 8:30 and 17:30 local time.
