= Adil of Candar =

Beg of Candar from c. 1346 to 1361

Adil Beg was the ruler of Candar in northern Anatolia from c. 1346 until c. 1361. There are undated coins honoring him as an emir that were minted in Kastamonu and Sinop. Coins that potentially belong to him but do not mention his name include the title sultan. Adil is known to have allowed the formation of Venetian and Genoese colonies in Sinop. According to local traditional narrative, Adil died in a battle. His death year is unclear but was likely before 1362, when the literary work Maktel-i Hüseyin dedicated to Adil's son Bayezid refer to Adil's past reign. Historian Yaşar Yücel dates Bayezid's accession to the throne to 1361. According to the modern historian İsmail Hakkı Uzunçarşılı, Adil's reputed tomb is in the village of Kuzyaka, south of Kastamonu, where his mummified body is placed along with other deceased people, inside the vault below the türbe (mausoleum).

== Bibliography ==
- Uzunçarşılı, İsmail Hakkı (1969). Anadolu Beylikleri Ve Akkoyunlu, Karakoyunlu Devletleri [Anatolian Beyliks and Aq Qoyunlu, Qara Qoyunlu States] (in Turkish). Turkish Historical Society Press.
- Yücel, Yaşar (1993). "Candaroğulları". TDV Encyclopedia of Islam, Vol. 7 (Ca'fer es-Sâdik – Ci̇ltçi̇li̇k) (in Turkish). Istanbul: Turkiye Diyanet Foundation, Centre for Islamic Studies. pp. 146–149. ISBN 978-975-389-434-0.

Regnal titles
Preceded by Ibrahim I or Yakub	Bey of Candar; 1346–1361	Succeeded by Bayezid
