= Peloria =

Peloria may refer to:

- Peloria (festival), an ancient Greek festival.
- Peloria, is the aberration in which a plant that normally produces zygomorphic flowers produces actinomorphic flowers instead.
