= Ion of Chios =

5th-century BC Greek poet, dramatist and philosopher

- Ἴων ὁ Χῖος
- Born: c. 490/480 BC; Chios, Greece
- Died: c. 420 BC
- Occupations: Poet, playwright, philosopher, historian

Ion of Chios (/ˈaɪɒn/; Ancient Greek: Ἴων ὁ Χῖος; c. 490/480 – c. 420 BC) was a Greek writer, dramatist, lyric poet and philosopher. He was a contemporary of Aeschylus, Euripides and Sophocles. Of his many plays and poems only a few titles and fragments have survived. He also wrote some prose works, including a Pythagorean text, the Triagmos, of which a few fragments survive.

== Life ==
He was the son of Orthomenes, and was surnamed the son of Xuthus: probably a nickname alluding to Xuthus, the father of the mythical Ion. When very young he went to Athens, where he enjoyed the society of Cimon, of whom he left laudatory notices in some of his works which are quoted by Plutarch. Plutarch informs us that Ion severely criticised Pericles, who is said to have been his rival in love. Ion was familiarly acquainted with Aeschylus, if we may believe an anecdote related by Plutarch, but he did not come forward as a tragedian till after Aeschylus' death. We also learn from Ion himself that he met Sophocles in Chios, when the latter was commander of the expedition against Samos, 440 BC.

His first tragedy was brought out in the 82nd Olympiad (452 BC); he is mentioned as third in competition with Euripides and Iophon, in Olympiad 87.4 (429-8 BC); and he died before 421 BC, as appears from the Peace of Aristophanes, which was brought out in that year. Only one victory of Ion's is mentioned, on which occasion, it is said, having gained the dithyrambic and tragic prizes at the same time, he presented every Athenian with a pitcher of Chian wine. Hence it would seem that he was a man of considerable wealth. He is mentioned by Strabo among the celebrated men of Chios.

== Works ==
The number of his tragedies is variously stated at 12, 30, and 40. We have the titles and a few fragments of eleven plays, namely, Agamemnon; Alcmene; Argeioi; Eurytidai; Laertes; Mega Drama; Omphale; Phoinix or Kaineus; Phoinix Deuteros (The Second Phoenix); Phrouroi; and Teucer. The Omphale was a satyric drama. Pseudo-Longinus describes the style of Ion's tragedies as marked by petty refinements and want of boldness, and he adds an expression that no one in his senses would compare the value of the Oedipus with that of all the tragedies of Ion taken together. Nevertheless, he was greatly admired, chiefly, it would seem, for a sort of elegant wit. There are some beautiful passages in the extant fragments of his tragedies. Commentaries were written upon him by Arcesilaus, Baton of Sinope, Didymus, Epigenes, and even by Aristarchus. Besides his tragedies, we are told by the scholiast on Aristophanes, that Ion also wrote lyric poems, comedies, epigrams, paeans, hymns, scholia, and elegies. Some remnants of his elegies are in the Greek Anthology.

His prose works, mentioned by the scholiast on Aristophanes, are one called Presbeutikon (Πρεσβευτικόν), which some thought spurious; Ktisis (Κτίσις); Kosmologikos (Κοσμολογικός); Hypomnemata (Ὑπομνήματα); and some others, which are not specified. The nature of the first of these works is not known. The full title of the Ktisis was Chiou Ktisis (Χίου Κτίσις): it was a historical work, in the Ionic dialect, and apparently in imitation of Herodotus: it was probably the same as the Syngraphe (Συγγραφή), which is quoted by Pausanias. The Kosmologikos is probably the same as the philosophical work, entitled Triagmos (Τριαγμός) or Triagmoi (Τριαγμοί), which seems to have been a treatise on the constitution of things according to the theory of triads; the few surviving fragments suggesting it had Pythagorean leanings. The Hypomnemata are by some writers identified with the Epidemiai (Ἐπιδημίαι) or Ekdemetikos (Ἐκδημητικός), which contained either an account of his own travels, or of the visits of famous people to Chios.
