= Baton of Sinope =

- Born: 3rd century BC; Sinope (modern-day Turkey)
- Died: Unknown
- Occupations: historian; grammarian; rhetorician

Baton of Sinope (Ancient Greek: Βάτων ὁ Σινωπεύς, romanized: Bátōn ho Sinōpéus, fl. late 3rd century BC) was an ancient Greek historian and grammarian of the Hellenistic period.

== Life ==
Baton was apparently active in the second half of the third century BC, as we can deduce from the fact that Eratosthenes of Cyrene polemicized against him. Polybius also polemicized against his overly dramatic description of the death (in 214 BC) of the Syracusan tyrant Hieronymus.

Another piece of chronological evidence is offered by Plutarch, who writes in his Life of Agis:

Baton of Sinope says that Agis was unwilling to give battle although Aratus urged it; but Baton has not read what Aratus wrote [in his memoirs, now lost] about this matter, urging in self-defence that he thought it better, now that the husbandmen had gathered in almost all their crops, to suffer the enemy to pass by, instead of risking everything in battle.

Since Aratus' memoirs were published only after Aratus' death in 213 BC, Baton's unfamiliarity with the book might indicate that he wrote sometime prior to 213 BC.

== Works ==
Of Baton's works, only titles and fragments remain, which may indicate that in style he resembled more Phylarchus than Polybius. Athenaeus describes him as a rhetor. That Baton was cited by both Plutarch and Athenaeus demonstrates that his work continued to be read directly until at least the 2nd century AD. However, that he is not given a biographical entry in the Suda (10th century AD) suggests that he never attained first-rate importance as a historian.

Baton's works include:

- On Persia or On the Persian
- On the tyrants of Ephesus (Ancient Greek: Περὶ τῶν ἐν Εφέσῳ τυράννων)
- On Thessaly and Haemonia (Ancient Greek: Περὶ Θεσσαλίας καὶ Αἱμονίας)
- On the tyranny of Hieronymus (Ancient Greek: Περὶ τῆς τοῦ Ίερωνύμου τυραννίδος)
- On the poet Ion (Ancient Greek: Περὶ Ϊωνος τοῦ ποιητοῦ)
- At least two volumes of Chreia (anecdotes)

Athenaeus, in his Deipnosophistae, quotes verbatim a passage from Baton's treatise on Thessaly and Haemonia in which Baton asserts that the Roman Saturnalia derive from an "entirely Greek" (Ancient Greek: Ἑλληνικωτάτη) festival, saying that among the Thessalians it is called Peloria.
