= Mu'in al-Din Parwana =

Ruler of Sinope from 1265 to 1277

Muʿīn al-Dīn Sulaymān Parwāna
- Emīr ḥādjib; Parwāna
- Died: August 2, 1277
- Religion: Islam

Muʿīn al-Dīn Sulaymān Parwāna (Persian: معین الدین سلیمان پروانه), simply known as Parwāna (پروانه; died 2 August 1277), was a Persian statesman, who was for a time (especially between 1261–1277) a key player in Anatolian politics involving the Seljuk Sultanate of Rûm, the Mongol Ilkhanate and the Mamluks under Baybars.

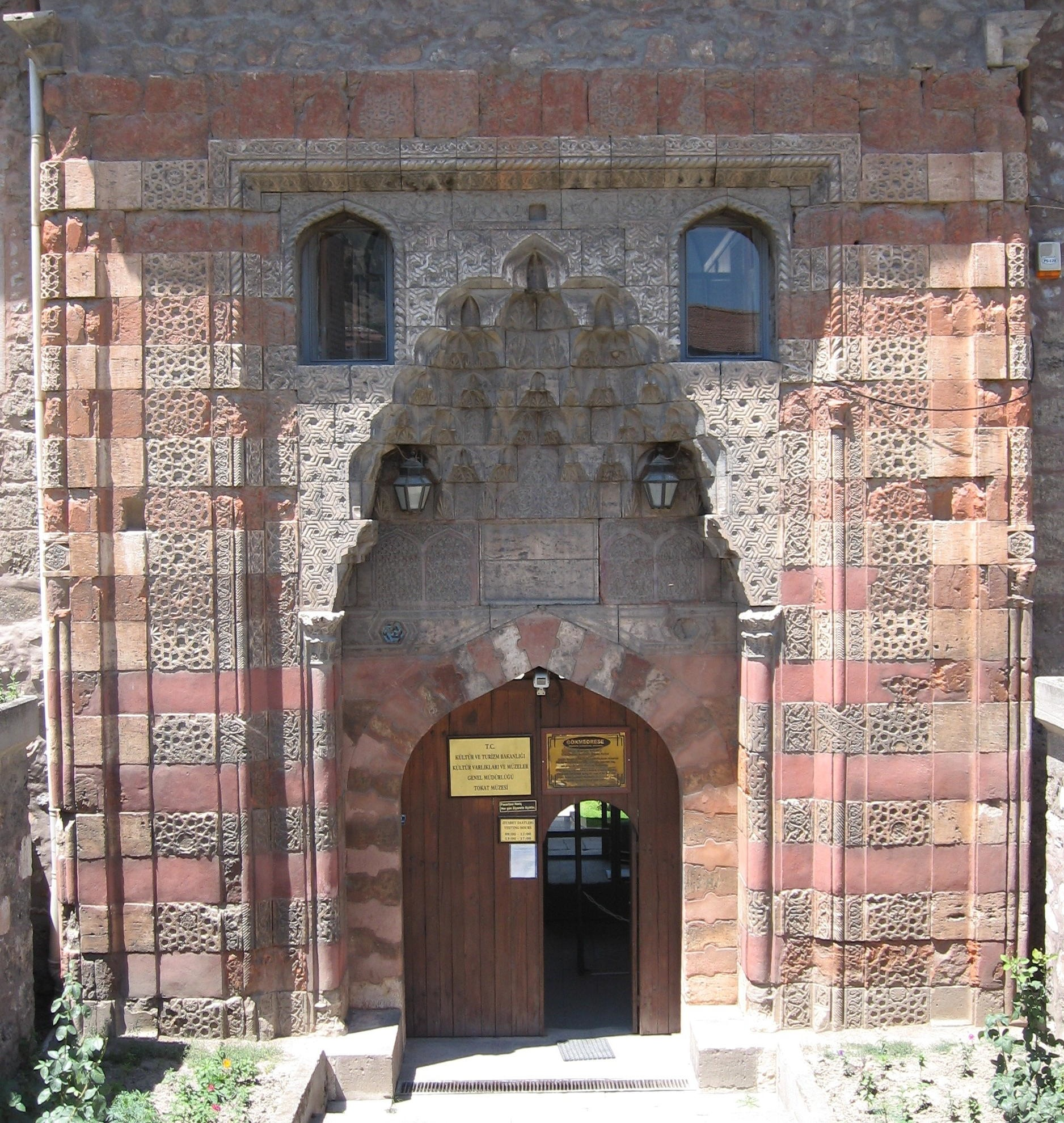
Façade of Gök Medrese in Tokat, founded by the Parwāna c. 1270.

== Biography ==
Mu'in al-Din Suleiman was the son of Muhadhdhab al-Din Ali al-Daylami, a Persian from Kashan, who served as the vizier to the Seljuq Sultan Kaykhusraw II in 1243 at the time of the Battle of Köse Dağ. Raised in a time of trouble after the Battle of Köse Dağ and having received a good education, Suleiman Parwana became commander of Tokat, and later Erzincan. He was appointed, by Mongol commander Bayju's recommendation, as chamberlain to the Konya palace of Seljuks sultan of Rûm, then vassals of the Mongols. He married Kaykhusraw's widow Tamar Gurju Khatun and became the undisputed master of the declining state, making a name as a great intriguer. His title parwana means "personal aide of the sultan".

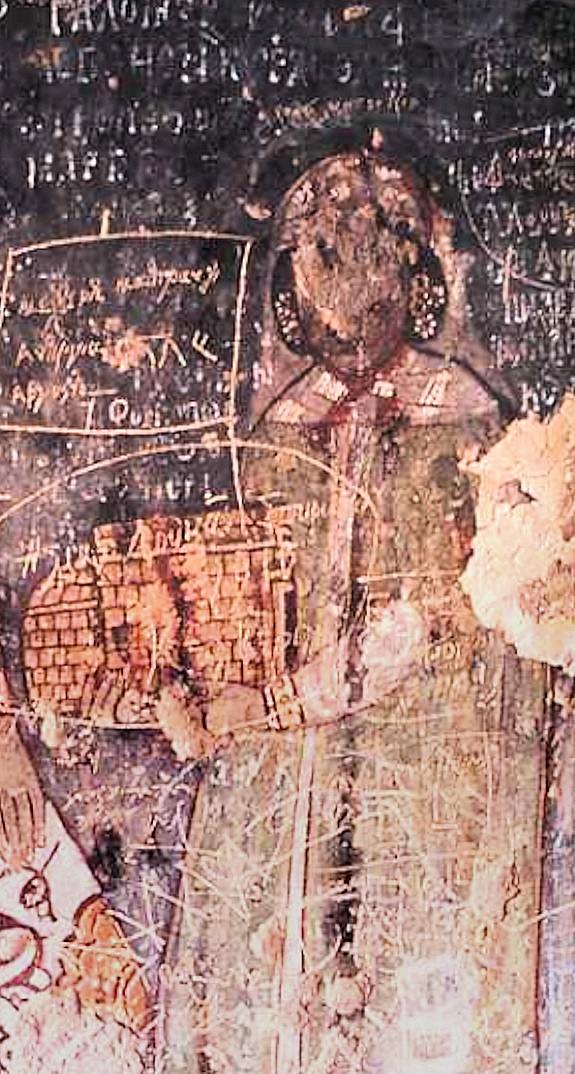
Likely depiction of Gurju Khatun, who married Mu'in al-Din Parwana.

After Kaykhusraw’s death and the ensuing dispute among his sons for the throne, the Parwana supported Kilij Arslan IV and succeeded in having him declared as the successor. In the same period, he also took Sinop and twelve surrounding castles from the Empire of Trebizond and the region was accorded to him and his family as an iqta. His growing power made him worry that the sultan Kilij Arslan IV might want to eliminate him and he took the initiative by having the sultan strangled in Aksaray in 1265. The throne was succeeded by Kilij Arslan IV's minor son Kaykhusraw III (1265–1283).

During the Mamluk-Ilkhanid War and especially after the Mamluk hand had strengthened under Baybars, Parwana's policy was characterized by multiple allegiances, all at the same time wishing to keep all his options open. According to Ibn Shaddad, when Baybars came to Syria in 1275, Parwana played a pivotal role in dissuading him from his plans for invading the Anatolian heartland and directed him rather towards raids in the Armenian Kingdom of Cilicia, persuading him to leave the territories of his sultanate to the following year. But neither did he enjoy the Ilkhan Abaqa's full confidence and the successes of Baybars had brought insipient anti-Mongol feelings among Seljuk notables, led by the Seljuk governors of Diyarbekir, Harput and Niğde, to the fore.

In 1277, Baybars entered the Seljuk sultanate and on 18 March, overcame the Mongol army in Elbistan, while Parwana, who was in command of the Seljuk contingent expected by both Baybars and the Mongols, took flight to Tokat along with the young sultan. Baybars made a triumphal entry into Kayseri on 23 April and then returned to Syria. At the news of his troops' defeat, Abaqa hastened to Anatolia (July 1277) and sternly punished the Seljuk Turks, sources citing massacres of tens of thousands of people. Deeming him responsible for Baybars's foray into Anatolia, Abaqa also had Parwana killed on 2 August 1277.

The story that Abaqa forced his subjects to eat the flesh of the Parwana has its origin in Armenian history of Hetoum.

His son Mehmed Bey took over the family possessions around Sinop and pursued a prudent policy of allegiance to the Mongols, which was also pursued under his son Mesud Bey's period as Bey. Mesud Bey was kidnapped by the Genoese in 1298 and was held for a heavy ransom. The last representative of the Parwana's line was probably the Gazi Chelebi, a notable pirate who ruled Sinop in the first decades of the 14th century.

== Monuments ==
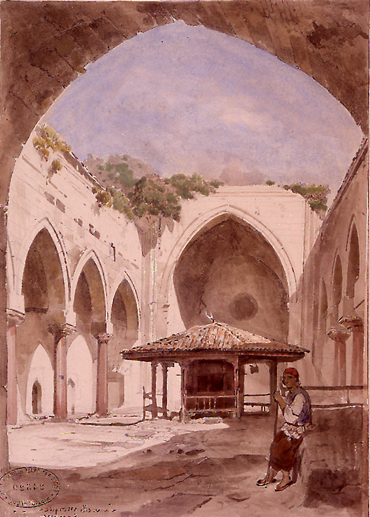
Court of Pervâne Medrese. Watercolour by Jules Laurens.

Several foundations of the Parwana survive. In Sinop the Alaeddin Camii stands on the site of the former cathedral, which sometime after 1214 was converted into a mosque by Kayqubad I. The present structure was built de novo by the Parwana in A.H. 666 (1267-68 C.E.). The nearby Alâiye Medrese, sometimes called the Pervâne Medrese, was completed the same year. In Tokat he built the so-called Gök Medrese in 1277. Founded as a hospital and medical school, the building now houses a museum. A nearby Seljuq style hamam is attributed to him although no inscription survives. There is another mosque of the Parwana in Merzifon.

Recently the archaeological remains of a medrese founded by the Parwana came to light within the compound of the closed bazaar of Kayseri. The medrese was partially excavated in 2002.

== See also ==
- Pervâneoğlu

== Bibliography ==
- (limited preview) Reuven Amitai-Preiss (1995). Mongols and Mamluks: The Mamluk-Ilkhanid War, 1260-1281. Cambridge University Press. ISBN 0-521-46226-6.
- Bosworth, Clifford Edmund (1996). New Islamic Dynasties: A Chronological and Genealogical Manual. Edinburgh University Press.
- (limited preview) René Grousset (translated by N. Walford) (1970). The Empire of the Steppes: A History of Central Asia. Rutgers University Press. ISBN 0-8135-1304-9.
- Hillenbrand, Carole (1993). "Muʿīn al-Dīn Sulaymān Parwāna". In Bosworth, C. E.; van Donzel, E.; Heinrichs, W. P. & Pellat, Ch. (eds.). The Encyclopaedia of Islam, Second Edition. Volume VII: Mif–Naz. Leiden: E. J. Brill. ISBN 978-90-04-09419-2.
