= Yaman Candar =

Bey of Candar (1291 to 1309)

Şemseddin Yaman Candar

Bey of Candar
- Reign: 1291 – 1309
- Successor: Süleyman I
- Died: 1309
- Issue: Süleyman I
Names
- Temür Şemseddin Yaman Candar تيمور شمس الدين يمان جاندار
- Dynasty: Candar
- Father: Alp Arslan Yaman Candar Mehmed
- Religion: Sunni Islam

Şemseddin Yaman Candar (Old Anatolian Turkish: شمس الدين يمان جاندار), was the eponymous founder and first bey of the Candar dynasty and principality in late 13th century Anatolia. He reigned as Bey of the Principality of Candar from 1291 until his death in 1309.

== Early life ==
Descended from the Kayı branch of Oghuz Turks, Şemseddin Yaman Candar was the son of Alp Arslan Yaman Candar Mehmed Bey.

During his tenure as a senior commander in the imperial army of Seljuk sultan Mesud II, he was awarded the province of Eflani by the sultan for his distinction in service.

== Ascent ==
In 1291, the Ilkhanid emperor Arghun, who had been suzerain of the Seljuks died. As a result, in a bid to wrest for the Seljuk throne, Şehzade Kılıç Arslan, son of the late Sultan Kaykaus II who had previously been living in the Crimea made his way to Anatolia, where his principal allies were the Çobanoğulları.

Meanwhile, Sultan Mesud II, elder brother of Kılıç Arslan, attempted to capture him but was defeated by Kılıç Arslan and his Çobanoğulları ally Yavlak, leading to Mesud being taken prisoner. In the ensuing battle, Şemseddin Yaman Candar was successful in defeating the Çobanoğulları army and liberating Mesud II.

Arms of the House of Candar according to the Catalan Atlas of 1375.

== Principality of Candar ==
As a result of his victory and liberation of Sultan Mesud, Yaman Candar was awarded the former Çobanoğulları possession of Eflani in the Black Sea region of the Anatolian peninsula as his fiefdom, from which the Candaroğulları dynasty was established with subsequent generations gradually expanding into neighboring provinces and reigning until 1461, the year which saw the principality's incorporation into the Ottoman Empire by Mehmed II.

While there is no record of Yaman Candar's later life, it is believed that he died in the early 14th century. He was succeeded as bey by his son Süleyman I.

Yaman Candar House of Candar Died: 1309
Regnal titles
New title Dynasty founded	Bey of Candar; 1291 – 1309	Succeeded by Süleyman I
