= Statue of Diogenes =

Statue in Sinop, Turkey

- Diyojen Heykeli
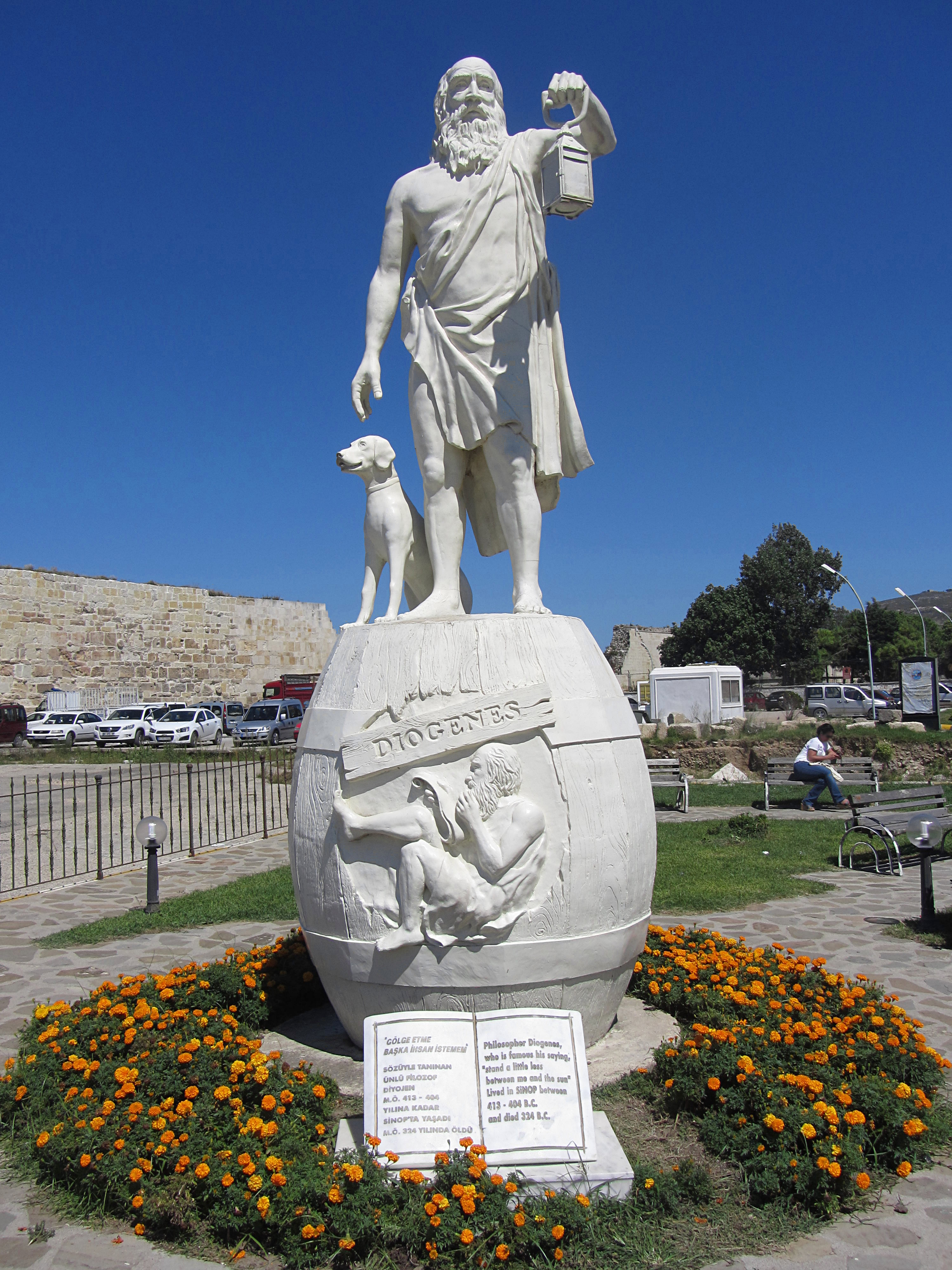
- Statue of Diogenes in Sinop, Turkey.
- Interactive map of Statue of Diogenes
- Location: Sinop, Turkey
- Coordinates: 42°01′31″N 35°08′29″E
- Designer: Turan Baş
- Height: 5.50 m (18.0 ft)
- Completion date: 2006
- Dedicated to: Diogenes of Sinope

The Statue of Diogenes (Turkish: Diyojen Heykeli) is a monument to the Ancient Greek philosopher Diogenes of Sinope, who was born in Sinop, ancient Asia Minor, Turkey in about 412 BC.

Sinop (then known as Sinope) is the birthplace of Diogenes in the 5th century BC. Sinop municipality decided to erect a statue of Diogenes. Its creator was Turan Baş of the Ondokuz Mayıs University in Samsun. The statue was erected in 2006.

It is situated at the center of the narrowest point of Sinop Peninsula isthmus. Other historically notable places of the city (like Sinop Fortress Prison) are close to the monument. The 5.50 m (18.0 ft) tall statue depicts Diogenes the Cynic standing with his dog on his dwelling barrel and searching for an honest man in the distance with his lamp in the hand.

According to the Turkish daily newspaper Milliyet, some politicians criticized the decision of the municipality on the ground that Diogenes having to look for an honest man far in the distance insulted the honest people of Sinop. However, that legend had originated in Athens and not in Sinop.
