= Kastamonu Castle =

Medieval castle in Turkey

- Kastamonu Kalesi
- Kastamonu, Turkey
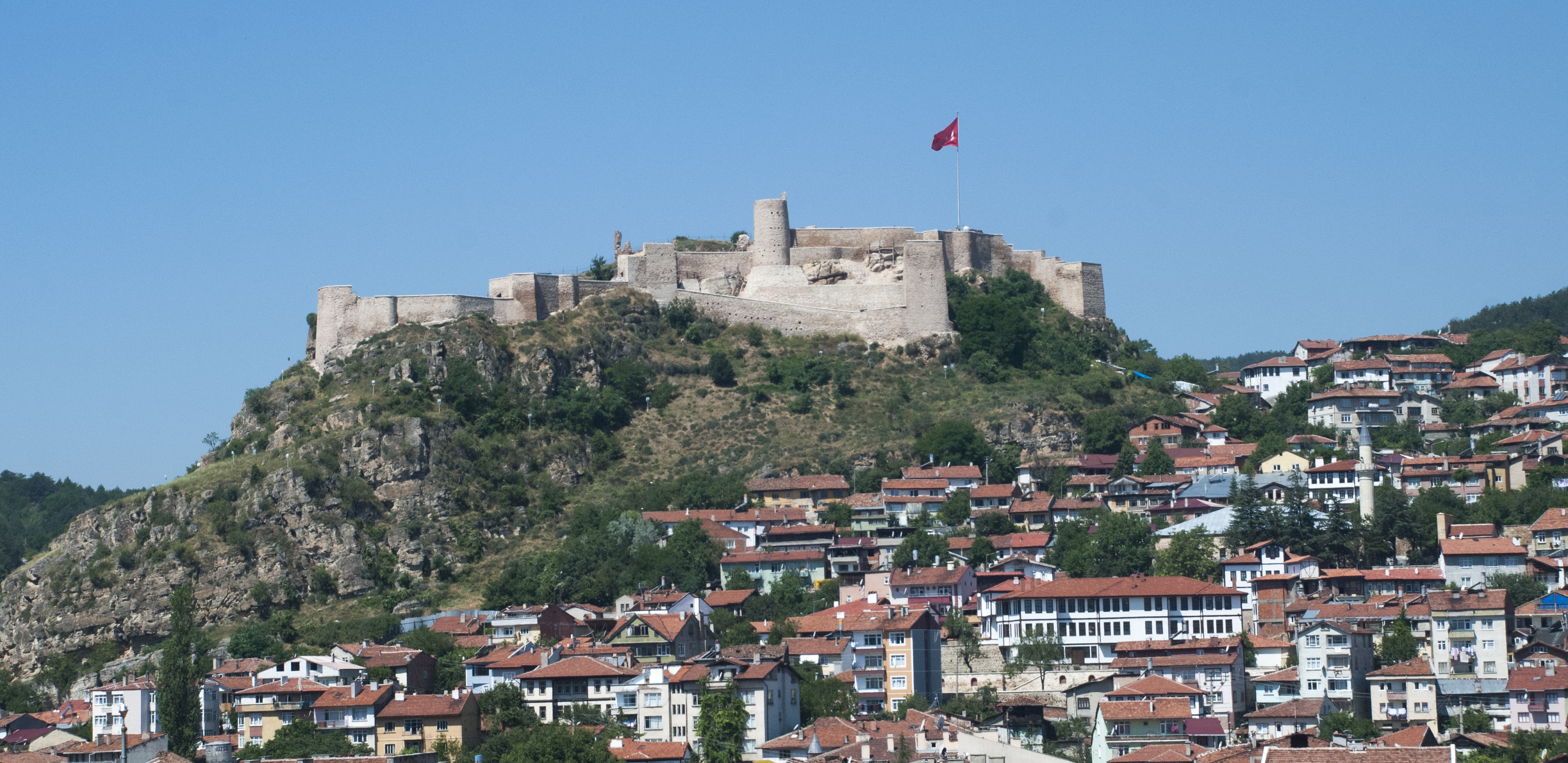
- Kastamonu Castle from the city center

Site information
- Type: Castle
- Controlled by: Byzantine Empire; Seljuks; Candarids; Ottoman Empire

Location
- Coordinates: 41°22′28″N 33°46′11″E

Site history
- Materials: stone

Kastamonu Castle is a medieval castle in Kastamonu, Turkey.

== Geography ==
The castle lies inside the urban fabric of the modern city. It is situated slightly to the south west of the city center at an elevation of about 860 metres (2,820 ft).

== History ==
During the 10th century, the area around Kastamonu was under the rule of the Byzantine commander Manuel Erotikos Komnenos who built the castle bearing his name: Kastra Komnenon, "Castle of the Komnenoi", a corrupted version of which later became the name of the city in Turkish, i.e. Kastamonu. The city and the castle were captured by the Çobanoğlu on behalf of the Seljuks of Rum. After the Çobanoğlu, the castle fell to the Candaroğulları and finally to the Ottoman Empire. During the Turkish Republic era, in 1943, a part of the castle was destroyed as a result of 1943 Tosya–Ladik earthquake. In 2005 Kastamonu municipality partially restored the castle.

== Building ==
The original castle had fortification walls around the city. But presently only the inner castle which was restored during the Candarid era is partially standing. The north to south dimension of the castle is 155 metres (509 ft) and the width is 30 metres (98 ft) (narrowest) and 50 metres (160 ft) (widest). There are 15 bastions and a secret passage to the outer castle.
