= Sinop District =

District of Sinop Province, Turkey

- District
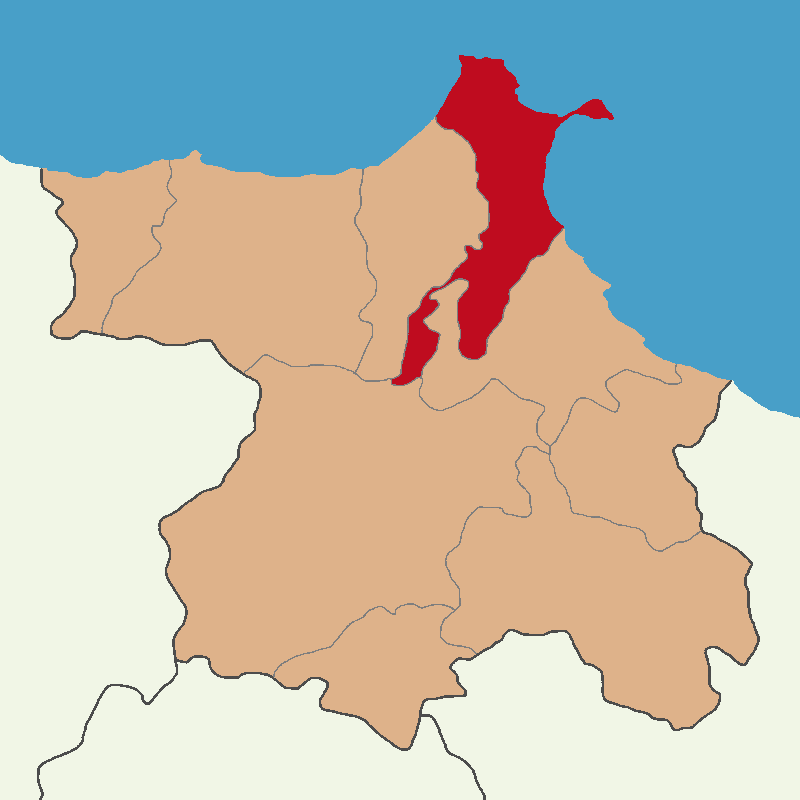
- Map showing Sinop District in Sinop Province

- Location in Turkey
- Coordinates: 42°00′N 35°05′E
- Country: Turkey
- Province: Sinop
- Seat: Sinop
- Area: 442 km^{2} (171 sq mi)
- Population (2022): 68,972
  - Density: 160/km^{2} (400/sq mi)
- Time zone: UTC+3 (TRT)

Sinop District (also: Merkez, meaning "central" in Turkish) is a district of the Sinop Province of Turkey. Its seat is the city of Sinop. Its area is 442 km^{2}, and its population is 68,972 (2022).

== Composition ==
There is one municipality in Sinop District:

- Sinop

There are 38 villages in Sinop District:

- Abalı
- Ahmetyeri
- Akbaş
- Alasökü
- Aloğlu
- Avdan
- Bektaşağa
- Çakıldak
- Çiftlikköy
- Çobanlar
- Demirciköy
- Dibekli
- Dizdaroğlu
- Erikli
- Eymir
- Fidanlık
- Göller
- Göllü
- Hacıoğlu
- Kabalı
- Karapınar
- Kılıçlı
- Kirençukuru
- Kozcuğaz
- Lala
- Melekşah
- Mertoğlu
- Oğuzeli
- Şamlıoğlu
- Sarıkum
- Sazlı
- Sinecan
- Tangaloğlu
- Taşmanlı
- Taypaklı
- Tıngıroğlu
- Uzungürgen
- Yalıköy
