= Metin Tuğlu =

Turkish footballer

Personal information
- Date of birth: 10 September 1984 (age 42)
- Place of birth: Durağan, Sinop, Turkey
- Height: 1.76 m (5 ft 9 1/2 in)
- Position: Left back

Team information
- Current team: Bandırmaspor
- Number: 54

Youth career
- 2000–2003: Tepecikspor

Senior career*
| Years | Team | Apps | (Gls) |
| 2003–2004 | Kırşehirspor | 3 | (0) |
| 2004–2005 | Keçiörengücü | 0 | (0) |
| 2005–2006 | Darıca Gençlerbirliği | 30 | (1) |
| 2006–2007 | Akçaabat Sebatspor | 10 | (0) |
| 2007–2009 | Gaziantepspor | 21 | (0) |
| 2009–2011 | Adanaspor | 45 | (0) |
| 2011 | Adana Demirspor | 17 | (2) |
| 2011–2012 | Kayseri Erciyesspor | 29 | (0) |
| 2012– | Bandırmaspor | 2 | (0) |
- * Club domestic league appearances and goals as of 31 October 2012

Metin Tuğlu (born 10 September 1984) is a Turkish professional footballer who plays as a left back for Bandırmaspor.
