= Kötürüm Bayezid =

Bey of Candar from 1361 to 1383

Bey of Candar
- Reign: 1361 – 1383
- Predecessor: Adil
- Successor: Suleiman II
- Died: 1385
- Issue: Suleiman II; İsfendiyar Bey; İskender; Gülbahar Hatun (?)
Names
- Candaroğlu Celaleddin Bayezid جانداراغلو جلال الدين بايزيد
- Dynasty: Candar
- Father: Adil
- Religion: Sunni Islam

Jalal al-Din Kötürüm Bayezid (Old Anatolian Turkish: جلال الدين بايزيد) was Bey of Candar from 1361 until 1383.

== Life ==
At the time of his enthronement, the principality had two powerful neighbors; the Ottoman Empire to the west and the Beylik of Eretna under Kadı Burhaneddin to the east, which made it a great challenge to maintain his dominion. Additionally, it was also a great challenge on the Black Sea coast where the Republic of Genoa and the Republic of Venice had interests.

== Death ==
Celâleddin Bayezid died in 1385.

Regnal titles
Preceded by Adil Bey	Bey of Candar; 1361–1383	Succeeded by Süleyman II
