= Peloria (festival) =

Thessalonians celebration that presented offerings to Zeus Pelorios

Peloria (Ancient Greek: πελώρια) was a festival in ancient Greece celebrated by the Thessalians. It was similar to the Roman Saturnalia. Sacrifices were offered to Zeus Pelorios and to the splendid banquets any strangers were admitted, prisoners were set free, slaves enjoyed the greatest liberty and were even waited upon by their masters. According to the legend, it originated back to the Pelasgians.

Athenaeus has a detailed description in his Deipnosophistae:

... But Baton of Sinope, the orator, in his treatise on Thessaly and Hæmonica, distinctly asserts that the Roman Saturnalia are originally a very Greek festival, saying that among the Thessalians it is called Peloria. And these are his words:—“When a common festival was being celebrated by all the Pelasgi, a man whose name was Pelorus brought news to Pelasgus that there had been some violent earthquakes in Hæmonia, by which the mountains called Tempe had been rent asunder, and that the water of the lake had burst through the rent, and was all falling into the stream of the Peneus; and that all the country which had formerly been covered by the lake was now laid open, and that, as the waters were now drained off, there were plains visible of wondrous size and beauty. Accordingly, Pelasgus, on hearing this statement, had a table loaded with every delicacy set before Pelorus; and every one else received him with great cordiality, and brought whatever they had that was best, and placed it on the table before the man who had brought this news; and Pelasgus himself waited on him with great cheerfulness, and all the rest of the nobles obeyed him as his servants as often as any opportunity offered. On which account, they say that after the Pelasgians occupied the district, they instituted a festival as a sort of imitation of the feast which took place on that occasion; and, sacrificing to Zeus Pelorius, they serve up tables admirably furnished, and hold a very cordial and friendly assembly, so as to receive every foreigner at the banquet, and to set free all the prisoners, and to make their servants sit down and feast with every sort of liberty and licence, while their masters wait on them. And, in short, even to this day the Thessalians celebrate this as their chief festival, and call it Peloria.”
