= Parwana (title) =

Court title in the Sultanate of Rum

Parwāna or pervāne (Persian: پروانه, lit. 'butterfly') was a court title of the Seljuk Sultanate of Rum (1077–1308). The title may be a poetic abbreviation of the title parwānačī, known from the Ilkhanate (1256–1335). It denoted the messenger who conveyed the sultan's personal messages. It may have originally denoted the messages themselves before coming to apply to the messenger. The sources show parwānas issuing farmāns in relation to the business of the dīvān (council), of which they were members, and issuing grants of iqṭāʿs. They headed the chancery and also bore the title ṭughrāʾī (secretary).

In the reign of Kilij Arslan II (1156–1192), a Danishmendid prince named Ẓāhir al-Dīn Ili held the office of parwāna. He may have founded the caravanserai Alayhan, originally called Pervane. By the early 13th century, the office of parwāna could be a powerful one. The powerful Muʿin al-Dīn Sulaymān held the office from 1256 and is known to posterity as Parwāna. The near dictatorial powers he acquired did not, however, come from his office of parwāna.
