= Sinop, Turkey =

Municipality in Turkey on the Black Sea

Sinop
- Municipality
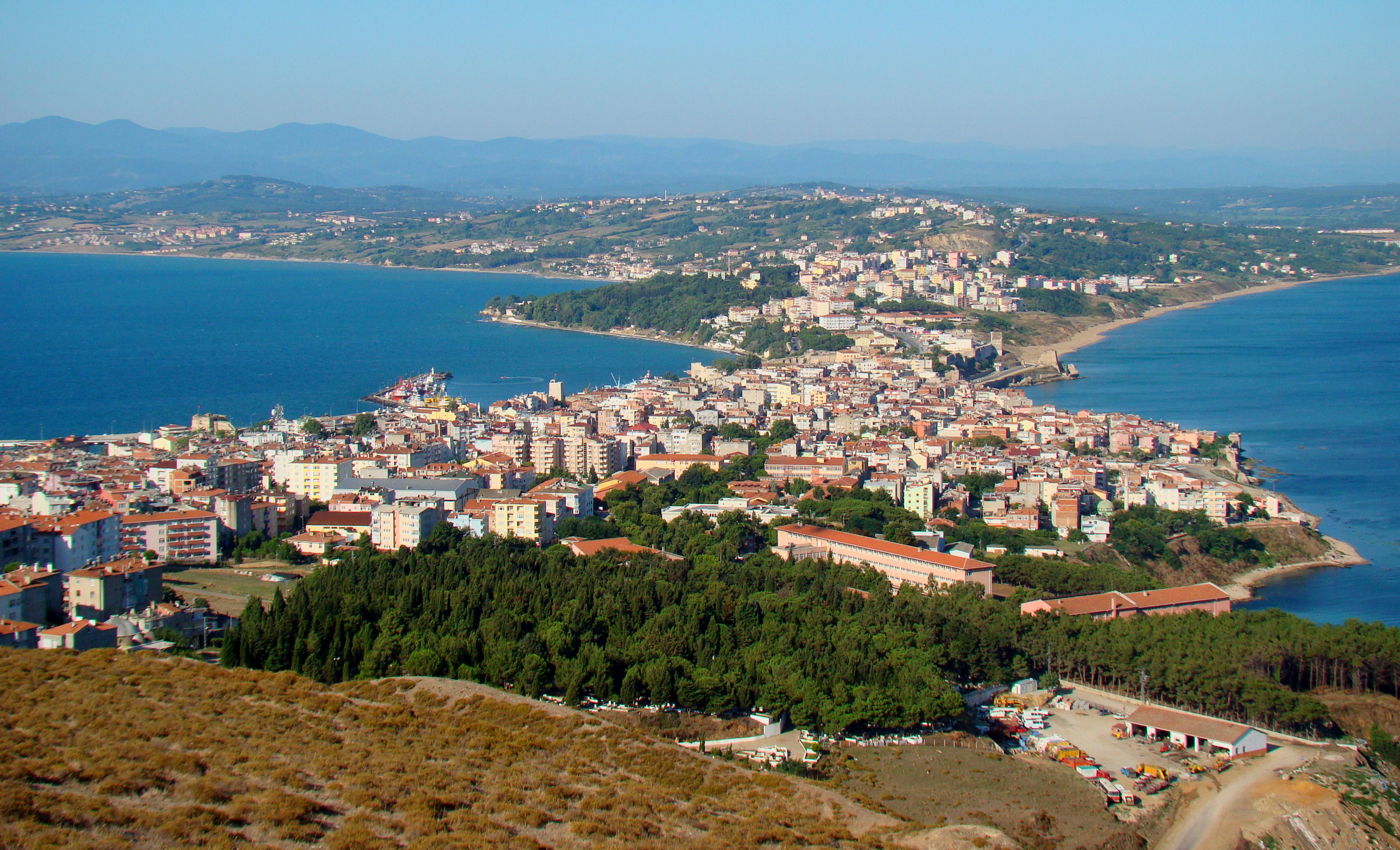

- Coat of arms

- Location within Turkey
- Coordinates: 42°01′36″N 35°09′04″E
- Country: Turkey
- Province: Sinop
- District: Sinop

Government
  - Mayor: Metin Gürbüz (New Party)
- Population (2022): 57,404
- Time zone: UTC+3 (TRT)
- Postal code: 57000
- Area code: 0368
- Climate: Cfa
- Website: www.sinop.bel.tr

Sinop is a city on the isthmus of İnce Burun (İnceburun, Cape Ince) and on the Boztepe Peninsula, near Cape Sinope (Sinop Burnu, Boztepe Cape, Boztepe Burnu) which is situated on the northernmost edge of the Turkish side of the Black Sea coast, in the ancient region of Paphlagonia, in modern-day northern Turkey. It is the seat of Sinop Province and Sinop District. Its population is 57,404 (2022).

== History ==
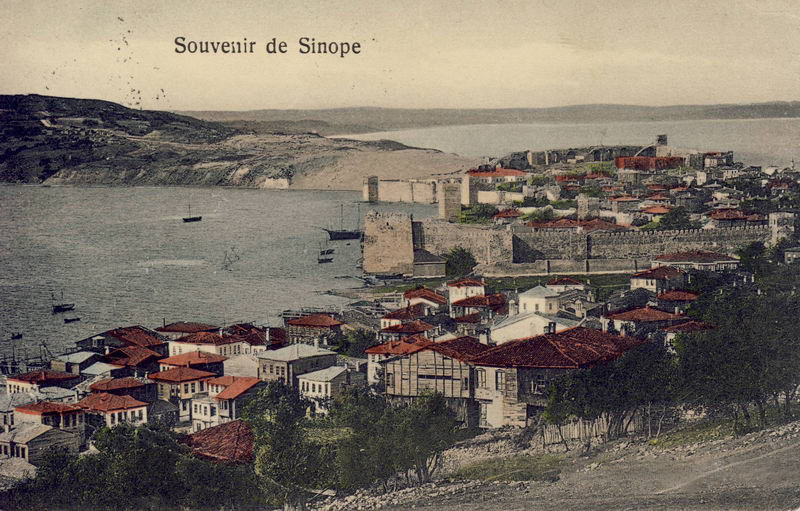
Sinop old city on an Ottoman era postcard.

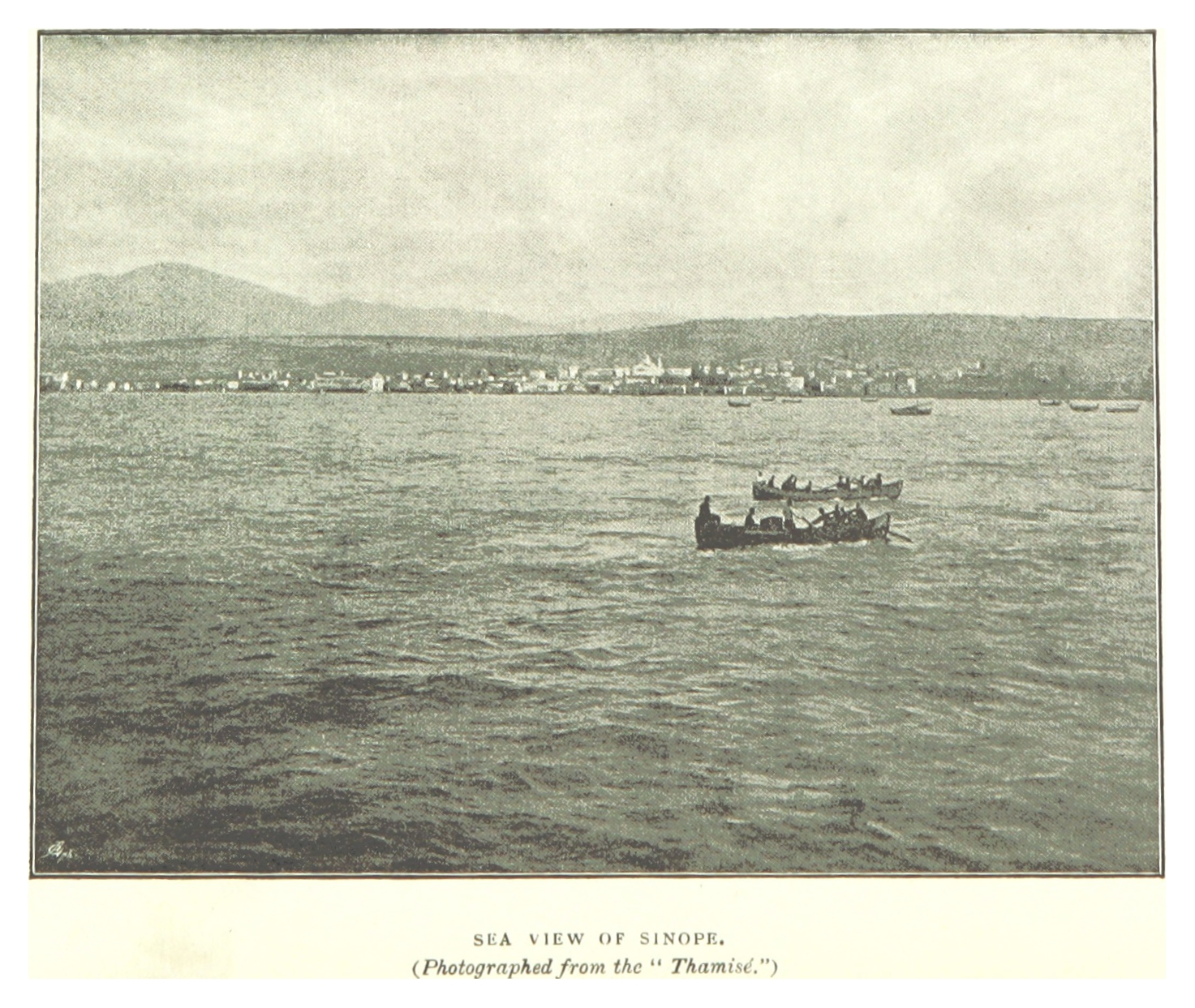
A seaside view of Sinope

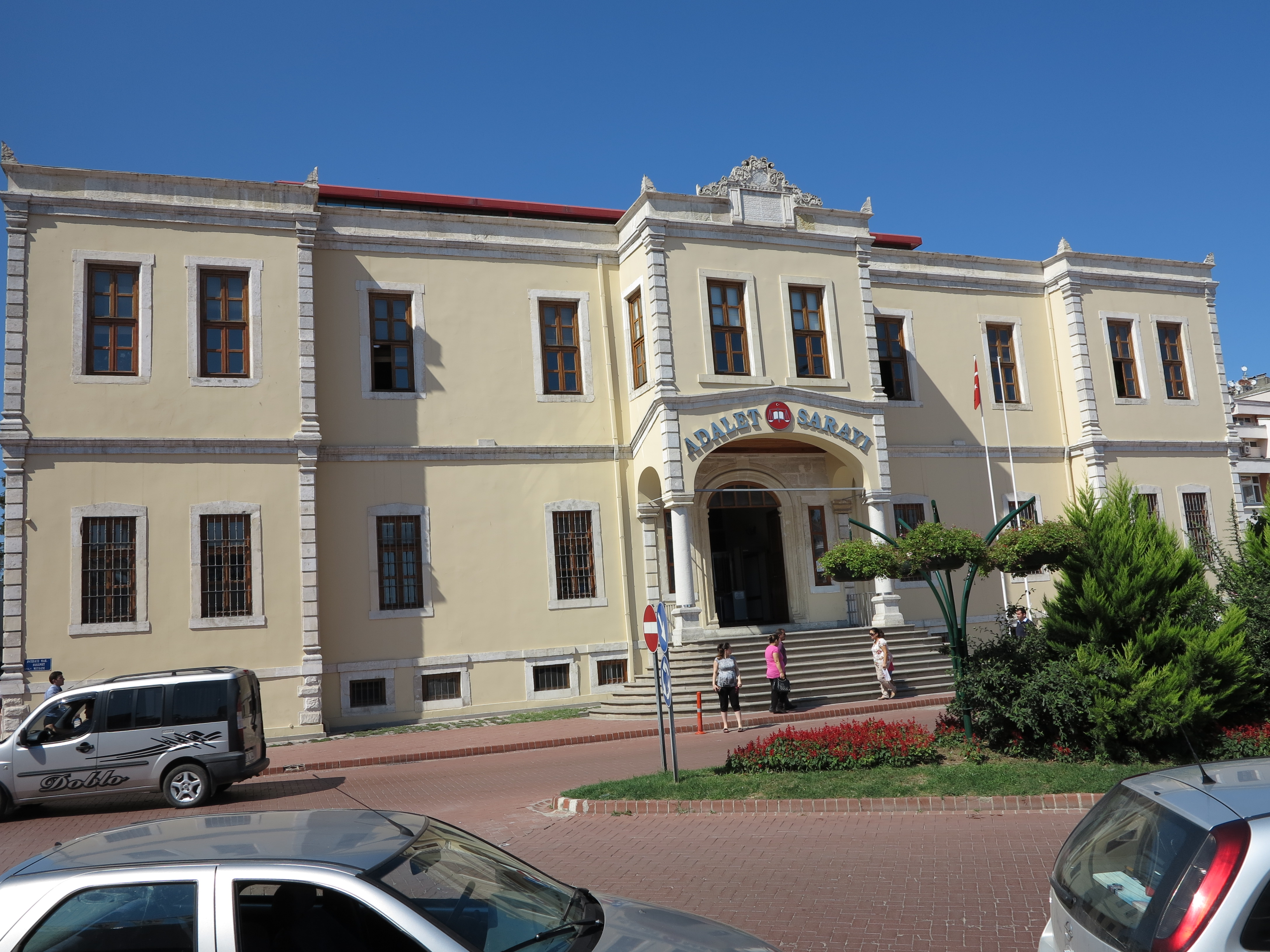
Sinop Palace of Justice.

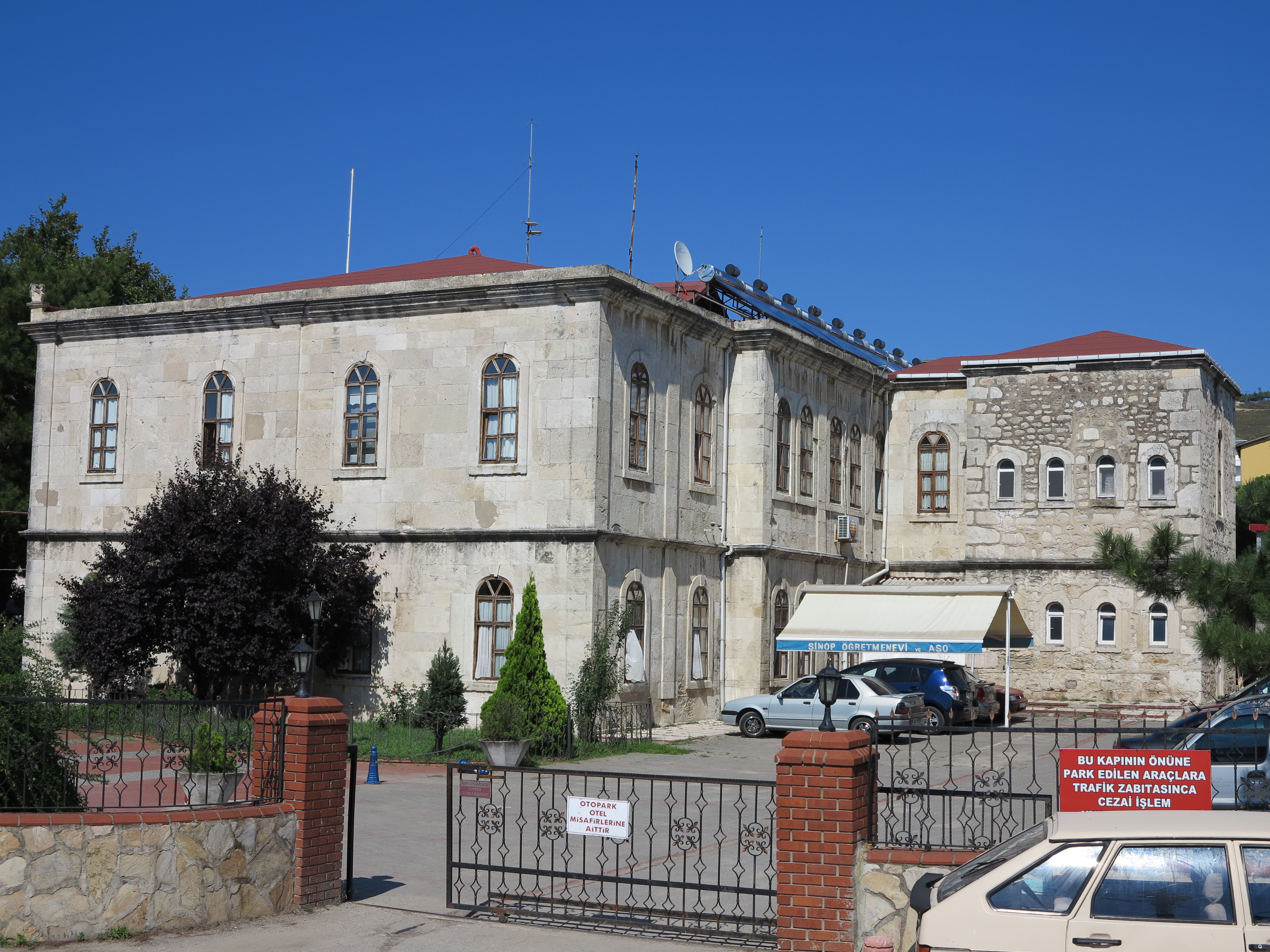
Sinop teachers residence.

Over a period of approximately 2,500 years, Sinope has at various times been settled by Colchians and then the Greeks (in the late 7th, late 5th, and 4th–3rd centuries BC) and by Turkic people beginning in the 13th century. In the 19th and 20th centuries it was also settled by the muhacir who immigrated from the Balkans and Caucasus.

The Greek colony of Sinope (Greek: Σινώπη, romanized: Sinṓpē) was founded by Ionians from the city of Miletus. Sinope issued its own coinage, founded colonies, and gave its name to a red earth pigment called sinopia, which was mined in Cappadocia for use throughout the ancient world. Some scholars have dated the earliest Greek colonization of Sinope to the 7th c. BC, while others have proposed an earlier date in the 8th c. While literary evidence exists supporting earlier settlement, archaeological evidence has been found of Greek settlement around the Black Sea region beginning in the late 7th century.

Sinope was strategically located among the trade routes that were developing on the southern Coast of the Black Sea, but remained relatively isolated from other inland communities until the 4th century BC. There is literary evidence of early links between Colchis and Sinope in mythological tradition. Strabo's writings link the legendary founder of Sinope, Autolycus, with Jason and the Argonauts. Polybius described Sinope as being "on the way to Phasis". The Persian Achaemenid Empire's northward expansion in the 4th century disrupted Sinope's control over its eastern colonies, including Trapezus (present day Trabzon). The satrap Datames briefly occupied the city around 375 BC. There is archaeological evidence of increased economic activity between the port city of Sinope and the surrounding inland areas during between 4th and 1st c. BC. Sinope appears to have maintained its independence from the dominion of Alexander the Great, and with the help of Rhodes turned back an assault led by Mithridates II of Pontus in 220 BC. Sinope eventually fell to Pharnaces I in 183 BC, after which it became the capital of the Pontic Kingdom.

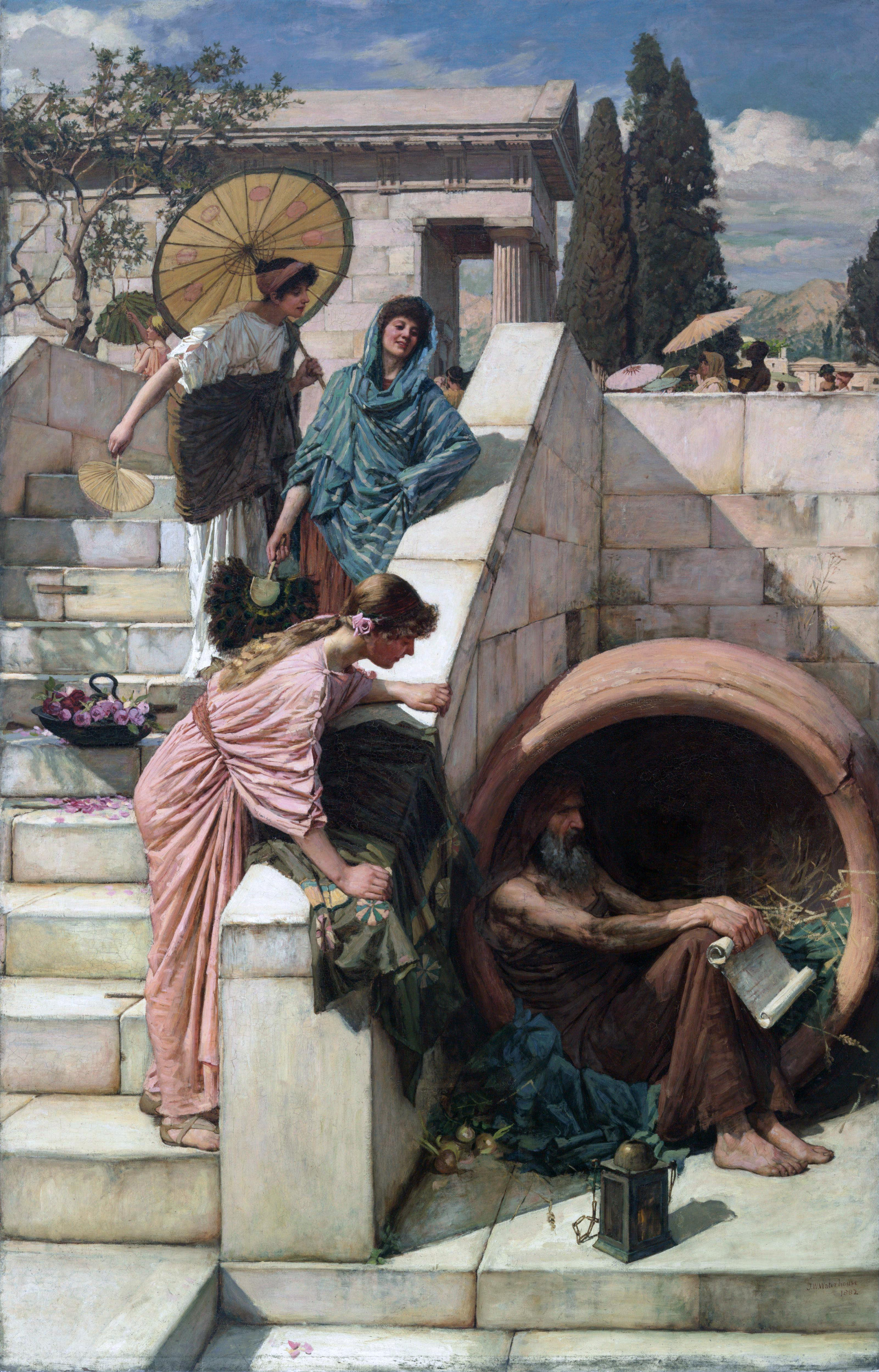
Diogenes by John William Waterhouse, 1882. Sinope is the birthplace of the famous Greek philosopher Diogenes.

The Roman general Lucullus conquered Sinope in 70 BC, and Julius Caesar established a Roman colony there, Colonia Julia Felix, in 47 BC. Mithradates Eupator was born and buried at Sinope, and it was the birthplace of Diogenes; of Diphilus, poet and actor of the New Attic comedy; of the historian Baton; and of the second-century Christian heretic Marcion.

After the division of the Roman Empire in 395, Sinope remained with the Eastern Roman Empire. Its history in the early Byzantine period is obscure, except for isolated events: it was used by Justinian II as a base from which to reconnoitre Cherson, participated in the rebellion of the Armeniac Theme in 793, was the site of Theophobos' proclamation as emperor by his Khurramite troops in 838, and suffered its only attack by the Arabs in 858.

In 1081, the city was captured by the Seljuk Turks, who found there a sizeable treasury and also destroyed the Church of Saint Phocas. Sinope was soon recovered by Alexios I Komnenos, who rebuilt the city and church, ushering a period of prosperity under the Komnenian dynasty. After the sacking of Constantinople by the Fourth Crusade in 1204, it was captured for the Empire of Trebizond by David Komnenos, until the Seljuk Turks of Rûm successfully captured the city in 1214. The city returned briefly to Trapezuntine rule in 1254, but returned to Turkish control in 1265, where it has remained since.

After 1265, Sinop became home to two successive independent emirates following the fall of the Seljuks: the Pervâne and the Isfendiyars. In 1315 the bishop of the city was forced to leave Sinop because of the Isfendiyars, and instead assumed the metropolis of Side. During his march on Trebizond, the Ottoman Sultan Mehmet II overawed Ismail, the emir of Sinop, and forced him to surrender the city without a fight. Mehmet took possession in late June 1461, exiling Ismail to Philippopolis (modern Plovdiv) in northern Thrace.

Ibn Battuta visited the city and stayed for about forty days. He noted it was "a superb city which combines fortification with beautification."

In 1614, Sinop was targeted by Cossack raiders and extensively looted and burned in an event which shocked Ottoman contemporaries.

In November 1853, at the start of the Crimean War, in the Battle of Sinop, the Russians, under the command of Admiral Nakhimov, destroyed an Ottoman frigate squadron in Sinop, leading Britain and France to declare war on Russia.

In the late 19th and early 20th century, Sinop was part of the Kastamonu Vilayet of the Ottoman Empire.

As of 1920, Sinop was described as populated mainly by Greeks with an approximate population of 8,000. It was also considered the "safest" port "between Bosphorus and Batum", at the time. During this period, the port was exporting wheat, tobacco, seeds, timber and hides. They imported produce, coal and hardware. The Greek inhabitants left in 1923 after the Population Exchange between Greece and Turkey, with many settling in Nea Sinopi.

Sinop hosted a US military base and radar that was important for intelligence during the Cold War era. The US base was closed in 1992.

Explorer Robert Ballard discovered an ancient ship wreck north west of Sinop in the Black Sea and was shown on National Geographic.

== Numismatics ==
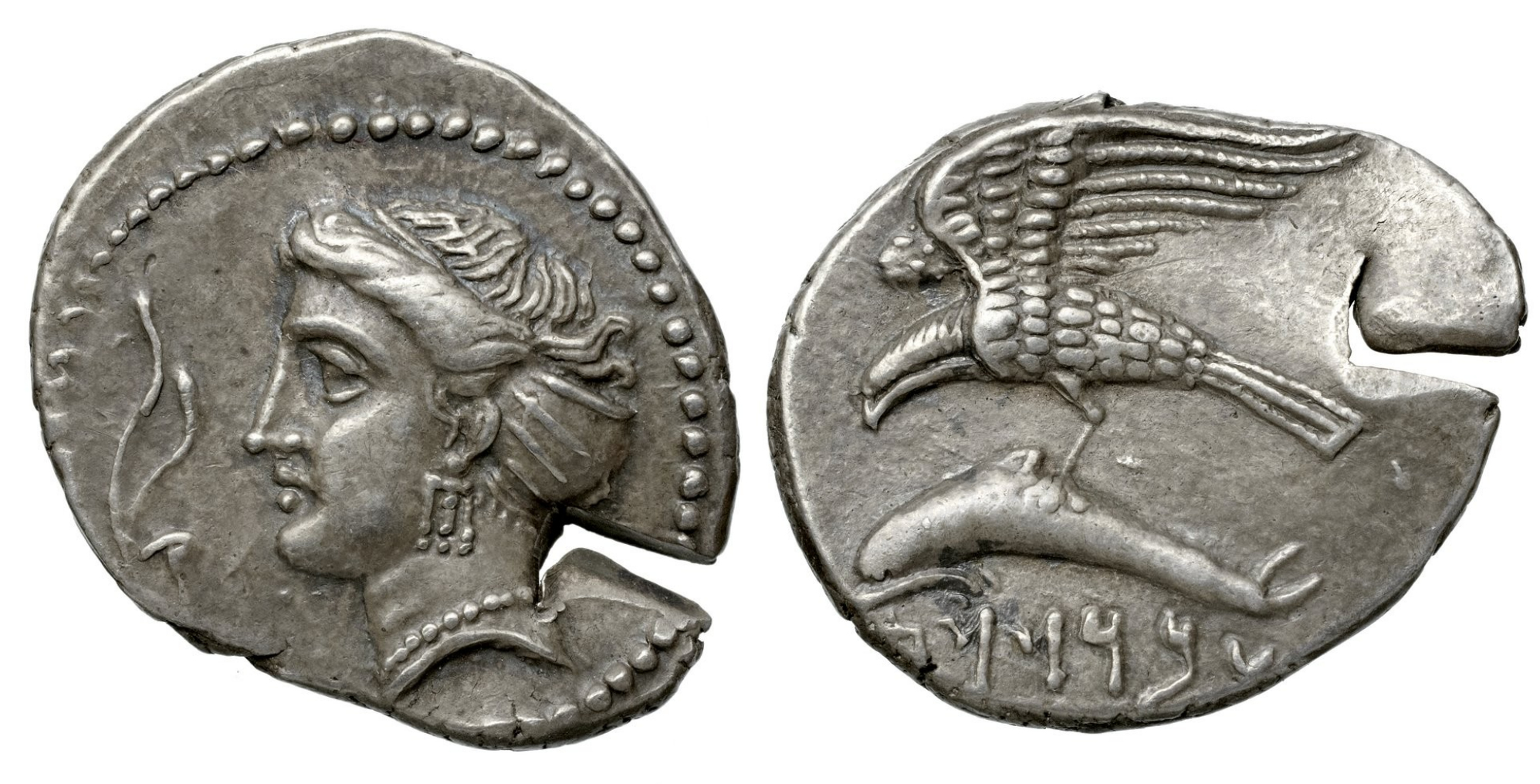
Coinage of Achaemenid satrap Abrocomas, Sinope, Paphlagonia, circa 400-385 BC.

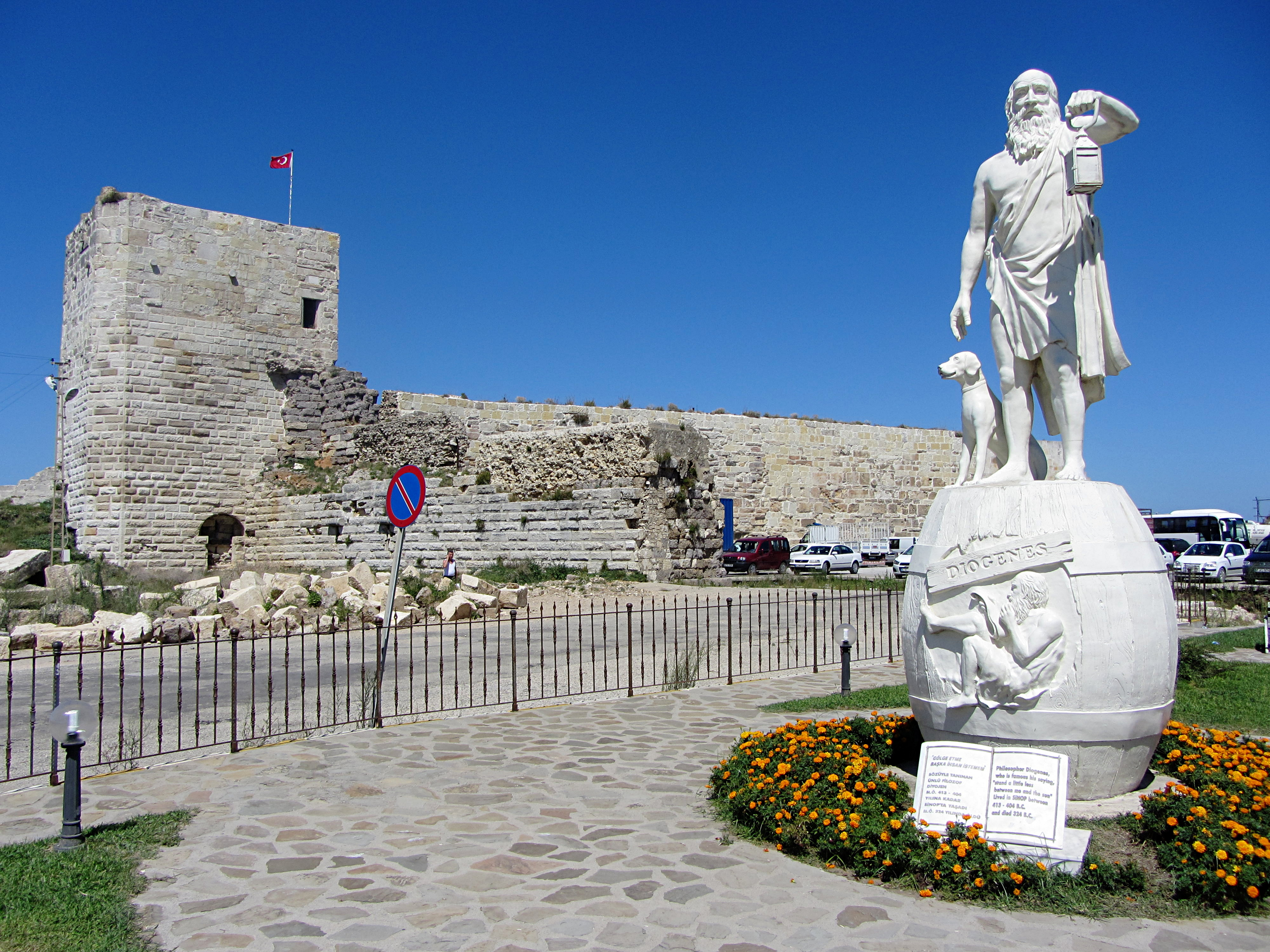
Statue of Diogenes at Sinop.

Greek coins featuring an eagle holding a dolphin or marine animal in its talons have been found in Sinope, Istria and Olbia. Located in present-day Turkey, Romania and Ukraine respectively, all three were colonies of Miletus. The coins circulated between c. 450 and 325 BC. Coins of the "Sinope type" continued to be issued by Persians under Achaemenid rule in the 4th century BC. At least two Persian issuers of such coins have been studied in some detail: the satrap Datames in Cappadocia and Ariarathes.

== Geography ==
Sinop is located on a promontory at the narrowest point of the Black Sea. It has two harbors and is located along the southern shore of the Black Sea, near the shortest crossing to the Crimea. The nearby mountainous terrain is green and noted for its timber.

=== Climate ===
Sinop has a humid subtropical climate (Köppen: Cfa, Trewartha: Cf).

Sinop has warm summers with an average daytime high of 26 °C (79 °F), and temperatures rarely exceed 30 °C (86 °F). The winters are cool and wet, the average for February is just below 7 °C (45 °F). Snowfall is occasional December to March, sometimes lasting a week or two.

Climate data for Sinop, Turkey (1991–2020, extremes 1936–2025)
Month	Jan	Feb	Mar	Apr	May	Jun	Jul	Aug	Sep	Oct	Nov	Dec	Year
Record high °C (°F)	22.8 (73.0)	25.0 (77.0)	32.2 (90.0)	32.0 (89.6)	33.6 (92.5)	33.2 (91.8)	34.5 (94.1)	39.3 (102.7)	34.2 (93.6)	34.0 (93.2)	27.9 (82.2)	27.4 (81.3)	39.3 (102.7)
Mean daily maximum °C (°F)	9.7 (49.5)	9.8 (49.6)	11.3 (52.3)	14.5 (58.1)	19.0 (66.2)	24.0 (75.2)	26.8 (80.2)	27.6 (81.7)	24.1 (75.4)	19.9 (67.8)	15.6 (60.1)	12.0 (53.6)	17.9 (64.2)
Daily mean °C (°F)	7.1 (44.8)	6.8 (44.2)	8.1 (46.6)	11.0 (51.8)	15.5 (59.9)	20.5 (68.9)	23.6 (74.5)	24.3 (75.7)	20.8 (69.4)	16.9 (62.4)	12.6 (54.7)	9.2 (48.6)	14.7 (58.5)
Mean daily minimum °C (°F)	4.9 (40.8)	4.4 (39.9)	5.6 (42.1)	8.4 (47.1)	12.7 (54.9)	17.6 (63.7)	20.6 (69.1)	21.4 (70.5)	18.1 (64.6)	14.4 (57.9)	10.0 (50.0)	6.9 (44.4)	12.1 (53.8)
Record low °C (°F)	−6.2 (20.8)	−7.5 (18.5)	−8.4 (16.9)	−0.4 (31.3)	−0.7 (30.7)	8.8 (47.8)	13.5 (56.3)	13.2 (55.8)	6.5 (43.7)	0.7 (33.3)	−1.2 (29.8)	−4.1 (24.6)	−8.4 (16.9)
Average precipitation mm (inches)	73.4 (2.89)	54.4 (2.14)	60.1 (2.37)	37.3 (1.47)	34.5 (1.36)	39.1 (1.54)	35.5 (1.40)	37.2 (1.46)	74.6 (2.94)	94.4 (3.72)	82.9 (3.26)	104.4 (4.11)	727.8 (28.65)
Average precipitation days	15.63	13.97	13.97	11.2	10.23	8.2	5.8	6.23	9.5	12.57	12.2	15.93	135.43
Average relative humidity (%)	75.2	75.8	78.3	79.9	81.8	79.8	79.3	78.4	78.2	79.4	76.8	74.4	78.1
Mean monthly sunshine hours	60.3	75.7	114.9	156.1	185.8	234.6	270.2	248.7	182.3	122.8	83.9	54.9	1,785.5
Mean daily sunshine hours	2.0	2.7	3.8	5.3	6.0	7.8	8.7	8.0	6.1	4.0	2.9	1.9	4.9
Source 1: Turkish State Meteorological Service
Source 2: NOAA(humidity, sun 1991-2020)

== Economy ==
As of 1920, Sinop was producing embroidered cotton cloth. They also were known for boatbuilding. The boats produced in Sinop were described by a British observer as being of "primitive design but sound workmanship."

Sinop was slated to be the site of the Sinop Nuclear Power Plant, a $15.8 billion nuclear power plant to be developed by Elektrik Üretim, Engie, Mitsubishi Heavy Industries and Itochu. The plant would consist of four reactors, with construction to begin in 2017 and completion by 2028. The project was cancelled in 2018.

== Cultural and other attractions ==
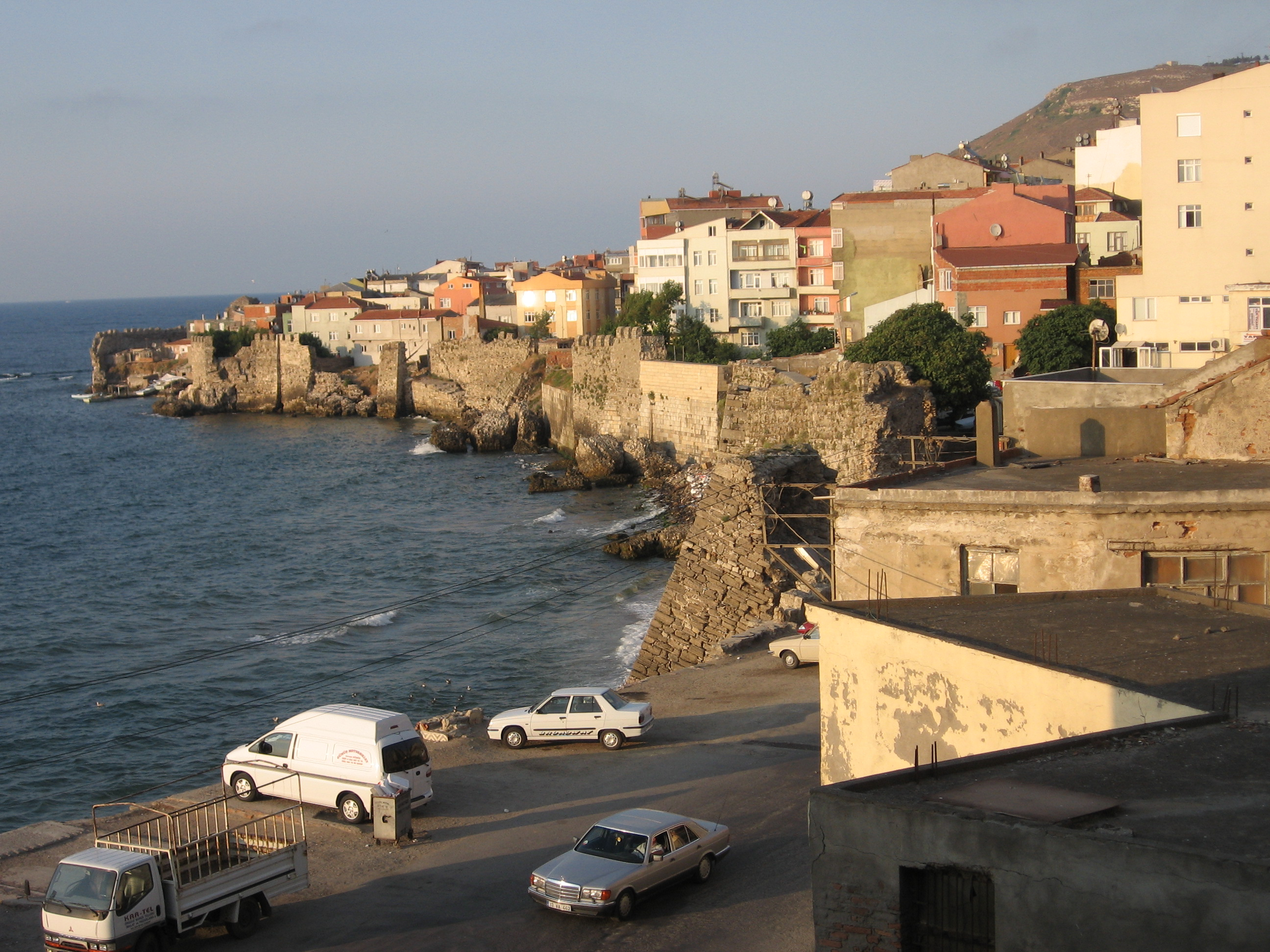
North walls of Sinop Fortress.

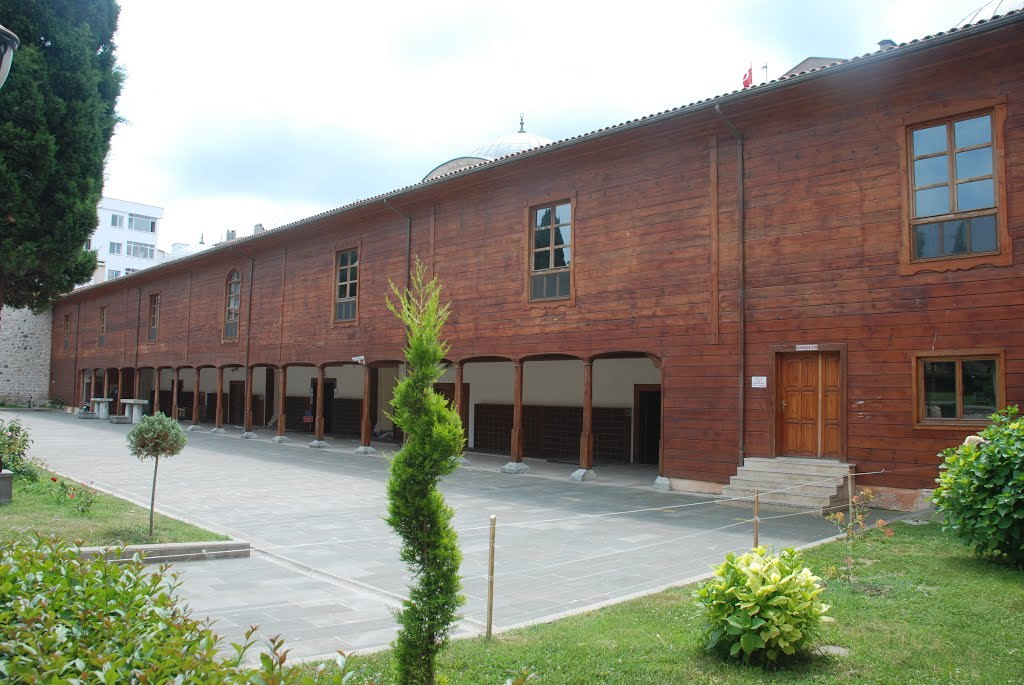
Alaaddin Mosque.

Visitor attraction places in Sinop are:

Pasha Bastion (Turkish: Paşa Tabyası) is a half-moon coastal bastion, a semi-circular fortification, situated southeast of Sinop Peninsula. It was constructed to protect the city against attacks coming from the Black Sea during the Russo-Turkish War, Crimean War (1853–1856). It features an artillery battery of eleven cannons, an arsenal and basement. Today, it is used as a place for refreshments premise.

Historic Water Tunnel (Turkish: Tarihi Su Kanalı) is an ancient underground water supply channel situated at Sülüklü Göl (literally: Lake of Leeches. Dug in rock, it is about 230 m (750 ft) long and has a clearance of 1.50 m (4.9 ft). There exists a 20–30 m (66–98 ft) high cylindrical ventilation shaft of 1.50 m (4.9 ft) diameter.

Balatlar Church (Turkish: Balatlar Kilisesi) is a ruined church from the Byzantine Empire period. It is partly preserved as only the chapel vault is in undamaged condition while other parts of the church have no roof any more. Fresco paintings on the chapel's ceiling and on the nave walls are still intact.

Serapeum is a ruined temple dedicated to the combined Hellenistic-Ancient Egyptian deity Serapis, situated in the southwestern corner in the yard of Sinop Archaeological Museum.

Alaaddin Mosque is a 13th-century mosque of Seljuk architecture named after its endower Sultan Alaaddin Kayqubad I (1188–1237).

Pervane Medrese is a former Islamic religious school, which was closed down after the proclamation of the Republic. The 13th-century building was used as a depot for archaeological artifacts and ethnographic items from 1932 on, and served as a museum between 1941 and 1970. It hosts souvenir shops today.

Sinop Fortress (Turkish: Sinop Kalesi) is a fortification surrounding the peninsula and the isthmus of Sinop. It was built initially by migrants from Miletus in the 8th century BC. The fortress underwent reparation and expansion to its current extent during the reign of King Mithridates IV of Pontus in the 2nd century BC after its destruction by the Cimmerians in the 7th century BC. Some parts of the fortress, especially the north walls, are ruined.

Sinop Fortress Prison (Turkish: Sinop Tarihi Cezaevi) is a defunct state prison situated inside the Sinop Fortress. Served between 1887 and 1997, the prison rose to fame when it featured in many literature works of notable authors, who were inmates of the prison for political reasons. It became also a shooting set for many movies and television series. It is a prison museum today.

Sinop Archaeological Museum (Turkish: Sinop Arkeoloji Müzesi) is a 1941-established archaeological museum exhibiting artifacts dating back to Early Bronze Age and from the Hellenistic, Roman, Byzantine, Seljuk and Ottoman periods as well.

Sinop Ethnographic Museum (Turkish: Sinop Etnografya Müzesi) is a museum of ethnographic exhibits belonging to the cultural history of the region. It is situated in a large 18th-century mansion.

Statue of Diogenes (Turkish: Diyojen Heykeli) is a monument to the Ancient Greek philosopher Diogenes of Sinope born in Sinop in about 412 BC.

== Notable people ==
- Diogenes the Cynic (413/03–324/1 BC), cynic philosopher
- Hegesias, cynic philosopher
- Diphilus (4th century BC), New Comedy playwright
- Heracleides, writer
- Baton (3rd century BC), historian and grammarian
- Mithridates VI (134–63 BC), king of Pontus
- Philologus, Christian Saint
- Marcion (c. 85–160 AD), Christian theologian and founder of Marcionism
- Aquila (2nd century AD), Bible translator
- Phocas (died 117 AD), Christian Saint, bishop of Sinope and martyr
- Phocas (c. 303 AD), Christian Saint and martyr
- Gazi Chelebi (14th century), naval commander
- Mubariz al-Din Isfendiyar (c. 1360–1440), Bey of Candar
- Helen (18th century), Christian Saint and martyr
- Rıza Nur (1879–1942), surgeon, politician and writer
- Maximus V (1897–1972), Ecumenical Patriarch of Constantinople
- Ahmet Muhip Dıranas (1909–1980), poet
- Necmettin Erbakan (1926–2011), former prime minister
- Hakan Ünsal (1973—), footballer
- Metin Tuğlu (1984—), footballer
- Sinan Uzun (1990—), footballer
- Gökçe Akyıldız (1992—), actress
- Ayça Ayşin Turan (1992—), actress

== Legacy ==
Sinope has given its name to the outermost satellite of Jupiter. A crater on Mars is named after Sinop too.

== Sister cities ==
Sinop has ten sister cities:

- Bogotá, Colombia
- Çorlu, Turkey
- Riffa, Bahrain
- Izki, Oman
- Järve, Tallinn, Estonia
- Mosjøen, Norway
- Murmansk, Russia
- Varna, Bulgaria

== Gallery ==
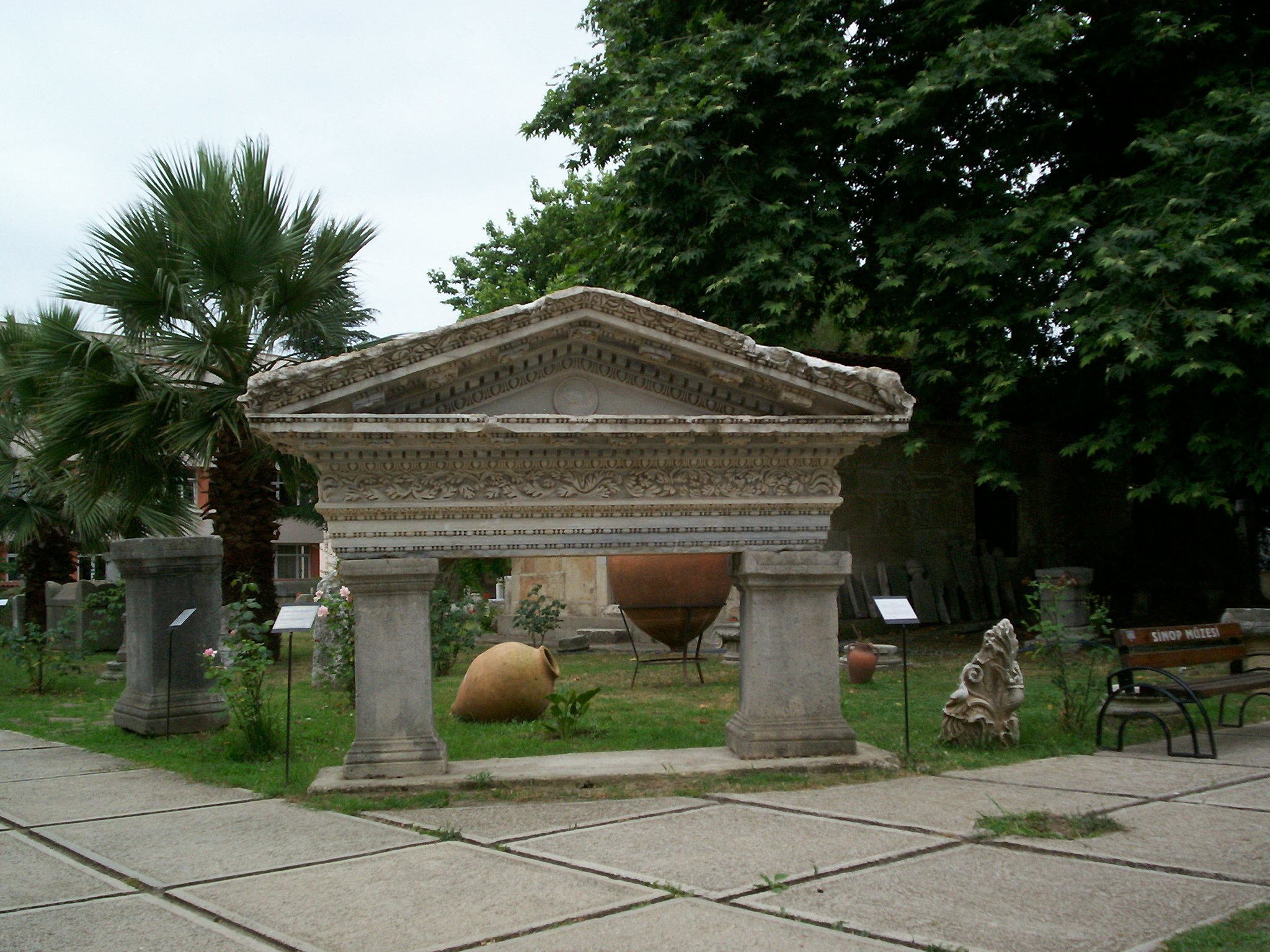
Sinop Museum.

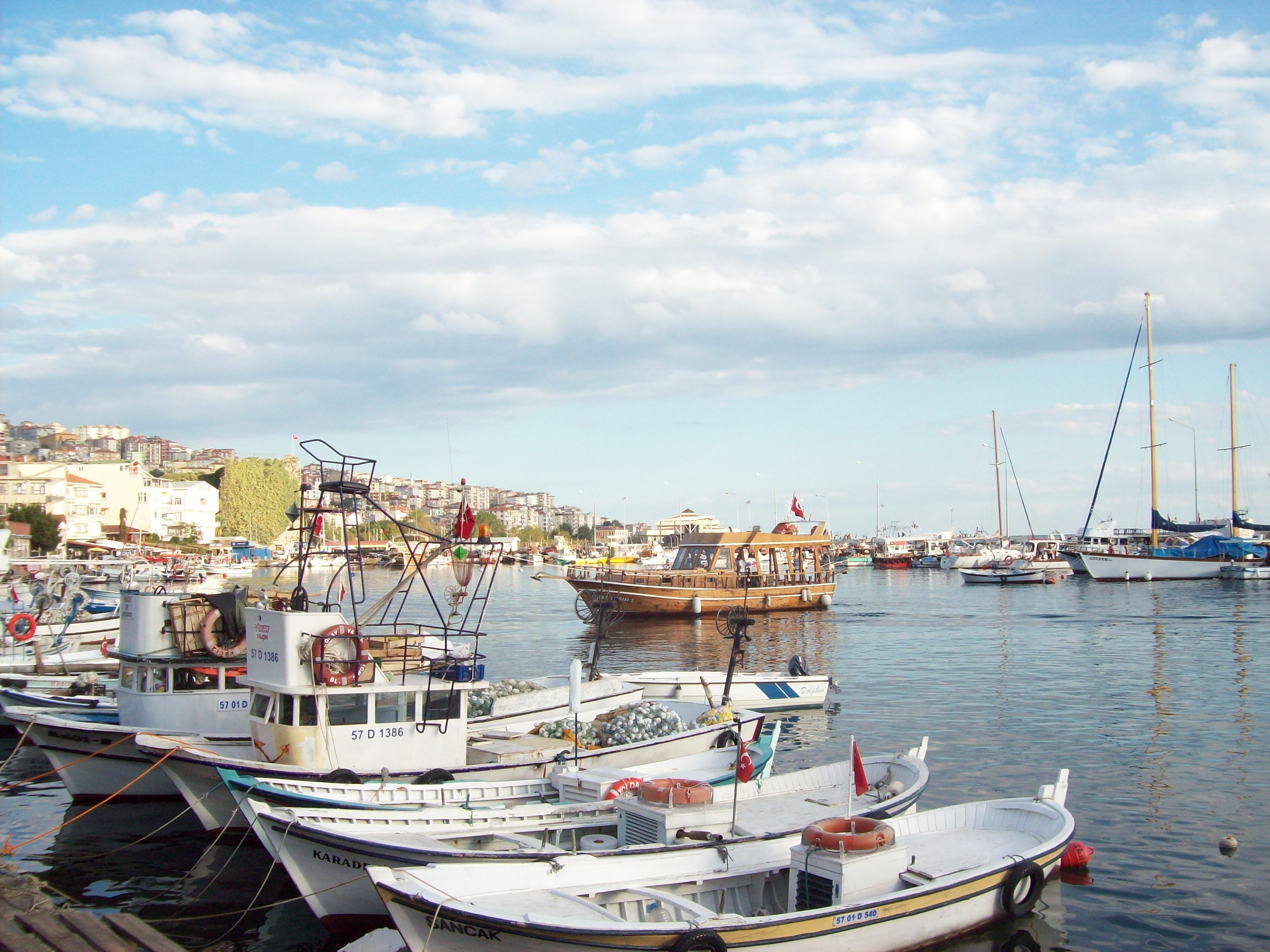
Sinop Marina.

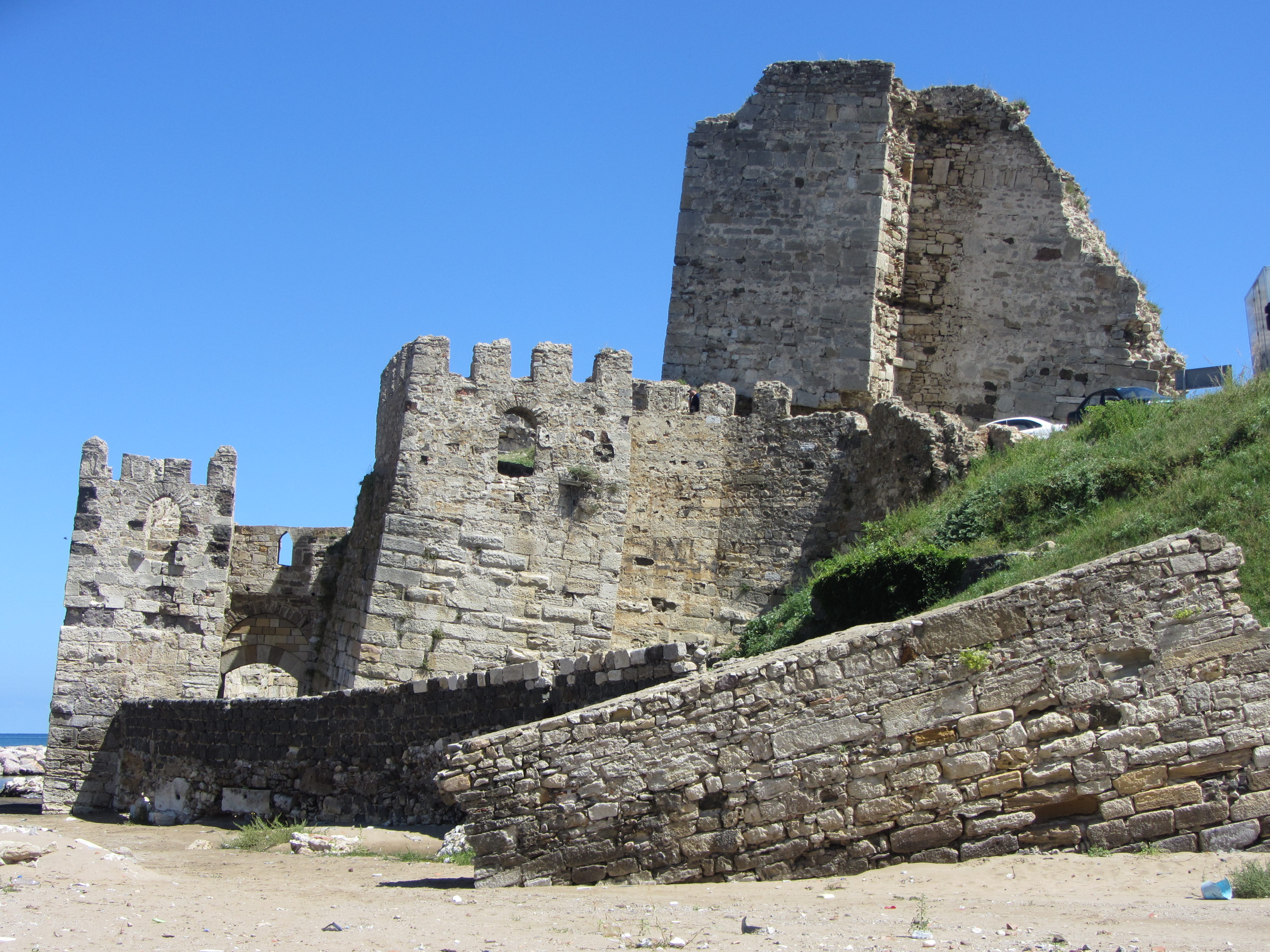
Sinop Fortress Ruins.

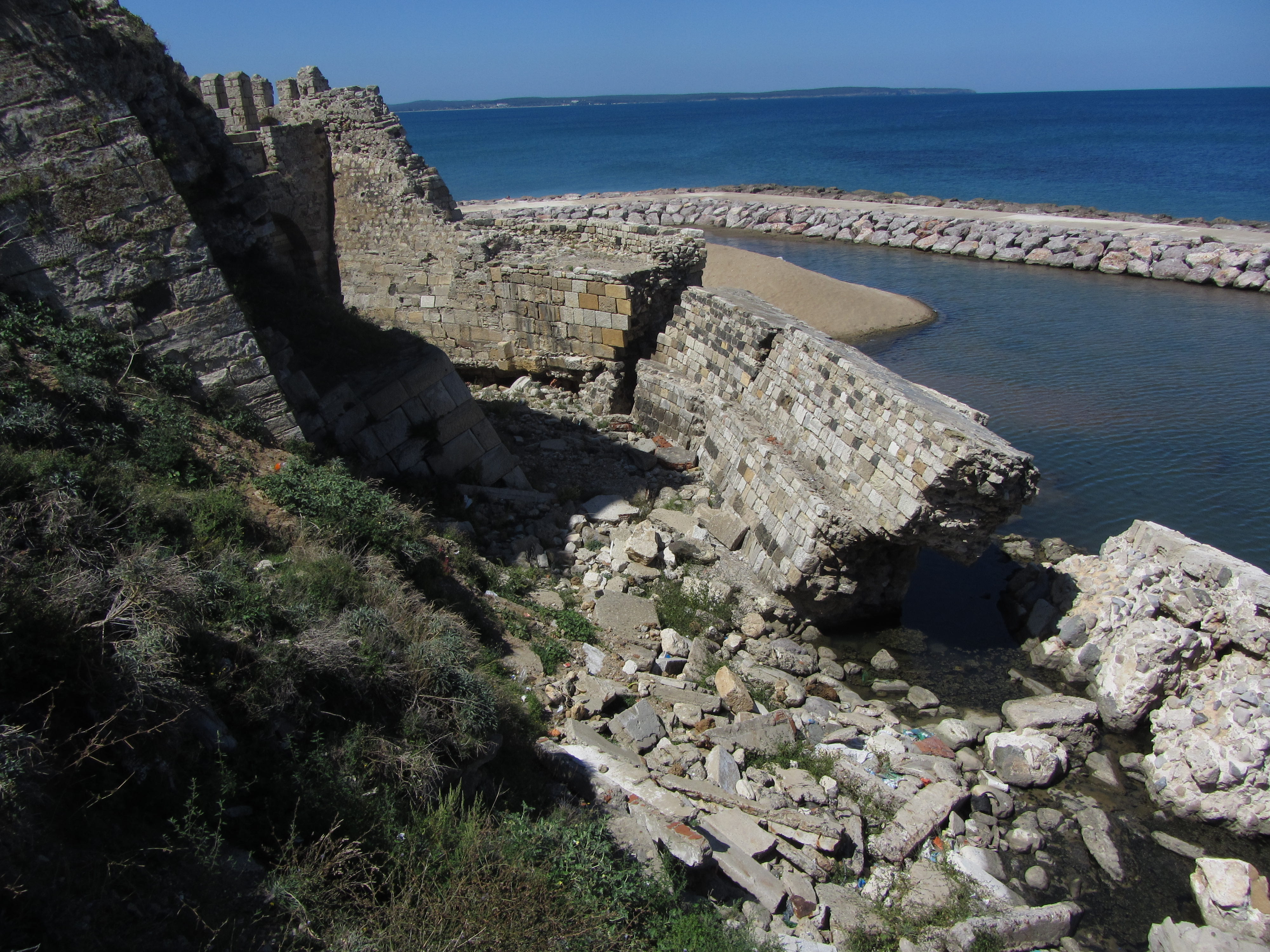
Sinop Fortress Ruins.

== See also ==
- Pervâneoğlu dynasty
- Isfendiyarids
- Gazi Çelebi
- Aquila of Sinope
- Sinope Gospels
