= Gazi Chelebi =

Turkish naval commander

The Gazi Chelebi (Turkish: Gazi Çelebi, "Warrior Gentleman") was the nickname of a naval commander who controlled the Black Sea port of Sinop, now in Turkey, in the first decades of the 14th century.

His epitaph in the Pervâne Medrese in Sinop states that he was the son of Mas’ud, probably the Mas’ud Bey kidnapped by the Genoese in 1298–99. The Gazi continued his predecessor's policy of harassing Genoese shipping in the Black Sea, and together with the Grand Komnenos (Emperor) of Trebizond Alexios II, was likely responsible for raids on the Genoese port of Kaffa in the Crimea between 1311 and 1314. When Ibn Battuta visited Sinop in either 1332 or 1334, the town had passed into the hands of the Jandarid Bey Ibrahim, but the memory of the Gazi Chelebi was still vivid. Inhabitants said that he possessed a talent for swimming under water and piercing the hulls of enemy galleys during battle. He did this with such stealth, they said, that the sailors did not know what had happened until their ships started to sink. In one memorable episode, probably in 1324, the Gazi used this method to sink several Genoese ships raiding Sinop's harbor, capturing their entire crew. The Sinopians also remembered that the Gazi Chelebi enjoyed smoking “an excessive quantity of hashish.”

His tomb is in Pervane Medrese in Sinop.
