= Candar dynasty =

Anatolian princely dynasty

House of Candar Candaroğulları
- 1291–1461
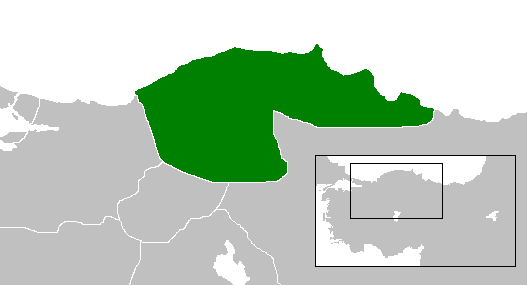
- Candaroğulları Beyliği Principality
- Capital: Eflani 1291–1309; Kastamonu 1309–1398; Sinop 1398–1461
- Common languages: Old Anatolian Turkish
- Religion: Sunni Islam
- Government: Beylik
- Bey
  - 1291: Şemseddin Yaman Candar Bey
  - 1461: Kızıl Ahmed Bey
- Historical era: Late Medieval
  - Established: 1291
  - Disestablished: 1461
Preceded by	Succeeded by
Sultanate of Rum	Ottoman Empire

The Candar dynasty (/ˈdʒandar/) or the House of Candar (Modern Turkish: Candaroğulları), Beylik of Candar, Principality of Candar (Candaroğulları Beyliği, Candar Beyliği), also known as the Isfendiyar dynasty (İsfendiyaroğulları), was an Oghuz Turkic princely Anatolian dynasty that reigned in the territories corresponding to the provinces of Eflani, Kastamonu, Sinop, Zonguldak, Bartın, Karabük, Samsun, Bolu, Ankara and Çankırı in the present-day Republic of Turkey from the year 1291 to 1461. The region is known in Western literature as Paphlagonia, a name applied to the same geographical area during the Roman period.

The dynasty and principality, founded by Şemseddin Yaman Candar Bey, were incorporated into the Ottoman Empire by Sultan Mehmed II in 1461.

== History ==
Descended from the Kayı branch of Oghuz Turks, the dynasty began when sultan Mesud II of the Seljuks of Rum awarded the province of Eflani to Şemseddin Yaman Candar, a senior commander in the imperial armed forces, in gratitude for rescuing him from Mongol captivity. The province had previously been under the rule of the Çobanoğulları.

Following the death of Şemseddin Yaman Candar, his son Süleyman I conquered the neighboring province of Kastamonu and annexed Safranbolu and Sinop, formerly ruled by the descendants of Mu‘in al-Din Suleyman. Süleyman subsequently appointed his son Ibrahim I as Governor of Sinop, while his second son Ali was appointed Governor of Safranbolu. Süleyman reigned under the authority of the Ilkhanate, the Mongols of Persia, until the death of their ruler Abu Sa'id.

Following the death of Süleyman I, his sons Ibrahim I and Ali were involved in a dynastic struggle for the throne. In 1339, Ibrahim was victorious and thus took over the rule of Kastamonu, the seat of the principality, as bey. Upon his death, he was succeeded by his cousin Adil (1346–1361), who in turn was succeeded by his own son, Kötürüm Bayezid. Kötürüm Bayezid Bey fought twice with Kadi Burhan al-Din, ruler of the Sivas region, and in 1383, lost Kastamonu to one of his own sons, Süleyman, who had received military support from the Ottoman sultan Murad I. Following this defeat, Kötürüm Bayezid Bey retreated to Sinop, which led to the division of the Beylik of Candar.

On Kötürüm Bayezid's death in 1385, his son Süleyman succeeded him as Süleyman II, and reunited the recently divided principality back into one realm. With Kastamonu Castle as his seat, Süleyman II remained faithful to Murad I, his supporter in his revolt against his father and predecessor, and, from 1386 to 1389, participated in various Ottoman campaigns in Europe.

In 1391, Murad's successor to the Ottoman throne, Bayezid I, launched an assault on Kastamonu in an attempt to gain control of the Anatolian beyliks, which saw the death of Süleyman II and with it an end to the Candar dynasty's long reign in Kastamonu.

Succeeding Süleyman II as bey was his son and heir İsfendiyar Bey, who in a bid to avoid conflict with the neighboring Ottomans, recognized the suzerainty of Bayezid I and became an Ottoman vassal, which Bayezid reciprocated by granting İsfendiyar autonomy in his dominion. However, after Bayezid was defeated at the hands of the Timurids in 1402, İsfendiyar recognized the authority of their Khan, Timur, who confirmed İsfendiyar's rule in the traditional Candar realm of Kastamonu, Kalecik, Tosya, and Çankırı.

Following the departure of Timur from Anatolia during the Ottoman Interregnum, İsfendiyar Bey stood close to all the four sons of Bayezid I. When one of his sons, Kasım claimed control over Çankırı and Tosya and declared the incorporation of these provinces to the Ottoman Empire, the Candar dominion was divided once more. İsfendiyar revolted against the new sultan Murad II, only to be defeated, and retreated to Sinop in 1423. İsfendiyar Bey died in 1439 and was succeeded by his son Ibrahim II, who upon his own death was succeeded by Ismail in 1443.

Following his conquest of Constantinople in 1453, the Ottoman sultan Mehmed II turned to Anatolia to unite the beyliks under his rule. In 1461, joining forces with Ismail's brother Kızıl Ahmed Bey, he captured Sinop and officially ended the reign of the Candar dynasty, although he did at first appoint Ahmed Bey as the governor of Kastamonu and Sinop, only for the appointment to be revoked in 1464.

=== Dynasty ===
After the incorporation of the Beylik of Candar into the Ottoman Empire, the ruling dynasty was offered various important functions within the administration of the Ottoman state, which they maintained until its dissolution in 1922. Descendants of the Candar dynasty live today as citizens of the Republic of Turkey mostly in Istanbul and in Europe, using various family names. Ayşe Sultan, who was the last identified descendant, died in Ankara in 1981, having benefited from the unique status afforded to the dynasty within the Ottoman Empire.

The arms of the House of Candar according to the Catalan Atlas of 1375.

=== Arms ===
Due to their similarities, the arms of Candar may be confused with what is now referred to as the Star of David. However, in medieval times, this particular symbol was not solely associated with Judaism, but also with Islam where it was known as the Seal of Solomon, borne by the prophet Sulaiman, son of David. The symbol gained popularity amongst the beyliks of Anatolia, with the Beylik of Karaman another state known to have adopted a variation of the seal on its flag.

== Sovereigns ==
Sovereign	Reign	Notes
Şemseddin Yaman Candar Bey	c. 1291	Dynasty founder and first bey.
Suleiman I Pasha	1309–1339	Following his death c. 1339, a dynastic struggle ensued between his two sons, İbrahim and Ali.
dynastic struggle
İbrahim Pasha	1339–1345	İbrahim was victorious in the struggle with his brother Ali in 1339.
Âdil Bey bin Ya'kûb	1346–1361	
Celaleddin Bayezid Bey	1361–1383	
Süleyman II Pasha	1384–1385	
İsfendiyar Bey	1385–1440	
Tâceddin Ibrâhim II Bey	1440–1443	
Kemâleddin Ismâil Bey	1443–1461	
Kızıl Ahmed Bey (The Red)	1461	The 10th and last bey of the Candaroğulları. Kızıl Ahmed Bey ruled for three months before the principality's incorporation into the Ottoman Empire.

== Genealogy of the House of Candar ==
House of Candar

Beylik of Candar

Yaman Candar r. 1291–1309
Suleiman I r. 1309–1339	Ya'qub
Ibrahim I r. 1339–1345	Adil r. 1345–1362
Bayezid r. 1362–1383
Suleiman II r. 1383–1385	Isfendiyar r. 1385–1440
Ibrahim II r. 1440–1443
Isma'il r. 1443–1461	Kızıl Ahmed r. 1461–1461

== See also ==
- Karamanids
- Ramadanids
- Aydinids
- Sarukhanids
- Hamidids

== Bibliography ==
- Mordtmann, J. H. (1978). "Isfendiyār Og̲h̲lu". In van Donzel, E.; Lewis, B.; Pellat, Ch. & Bosworth, C. E. (eds.). The Encyclopaedia of Islam, Second Edition. Volume IV: Iran–Kha. Leiden: E. J. Brill. ISBN 978-90-04-05745-6. OCLC 758278456.
- Uzunçarşılı, İsmail Hakkı (1969). Anadolu Beylikleri Ve Akkoyunlu, Karakoyunlu Devletleri [Anatolian Beyliks and Aq Qoyunlu, Qara Qoyunlu States] (in Turkish). Turkish Historical Society Press.
- Yücel, Yaşar (1993). "Candaroğulları". TDV Encyclopedia of Islam, Vol. 7 (Ca'fer es-Sâdik – Ci̇ltçi̇li̇k) (in Turkish). Istanbul: Presidency of Religious Affairs, Centre for Islamic Studies. pp. 146–149. ISBN 978-975-389-434-0.
