= Kuzeykent =

- Neighbourhood
- Location in Turkey
- Coordinates: 41°25′32″N 33°47′1″E
- Country: Turkey
- Province: Kastamonu
- District: Kastamonu
- Municipality: Kastamonu
- Population (2021): 29,725
- Time zone: UTC+3 (TRT)

Kuzeykent is a neighbourhood of the city Kastamonu, Kastamonu District, Kastamonu Province, Turkey. Its population is 29,725 (2021). It covers the northern part of the city, and is home to Kastamonu University and Kastamonu Inter-city Bus Station.
