= Kastamonu University =

Public university in Kastamonu, Turkey

- Type: State
- Established: 2006
- Rector: Ahmet Hamdi TOPAL
- Administrative staff: 740 non-medical 453 medical
- Students: 21,334
- Undergraduates: 19,691
- Postgraduates: 1,644
- Location: Kastamonu, Kastamonu, Turkey; 41°25′27″N 33°46′14″E
- Campus: Kuzeykent, Kastamonu, İnebolu, Tosya, Cide, Taşköprü
- Colors
- Website: www.kastamonu.edu.tr

University rankings

Regional – Overall
- QS Emerging Europe and Central Asia: 301-350 (2022)

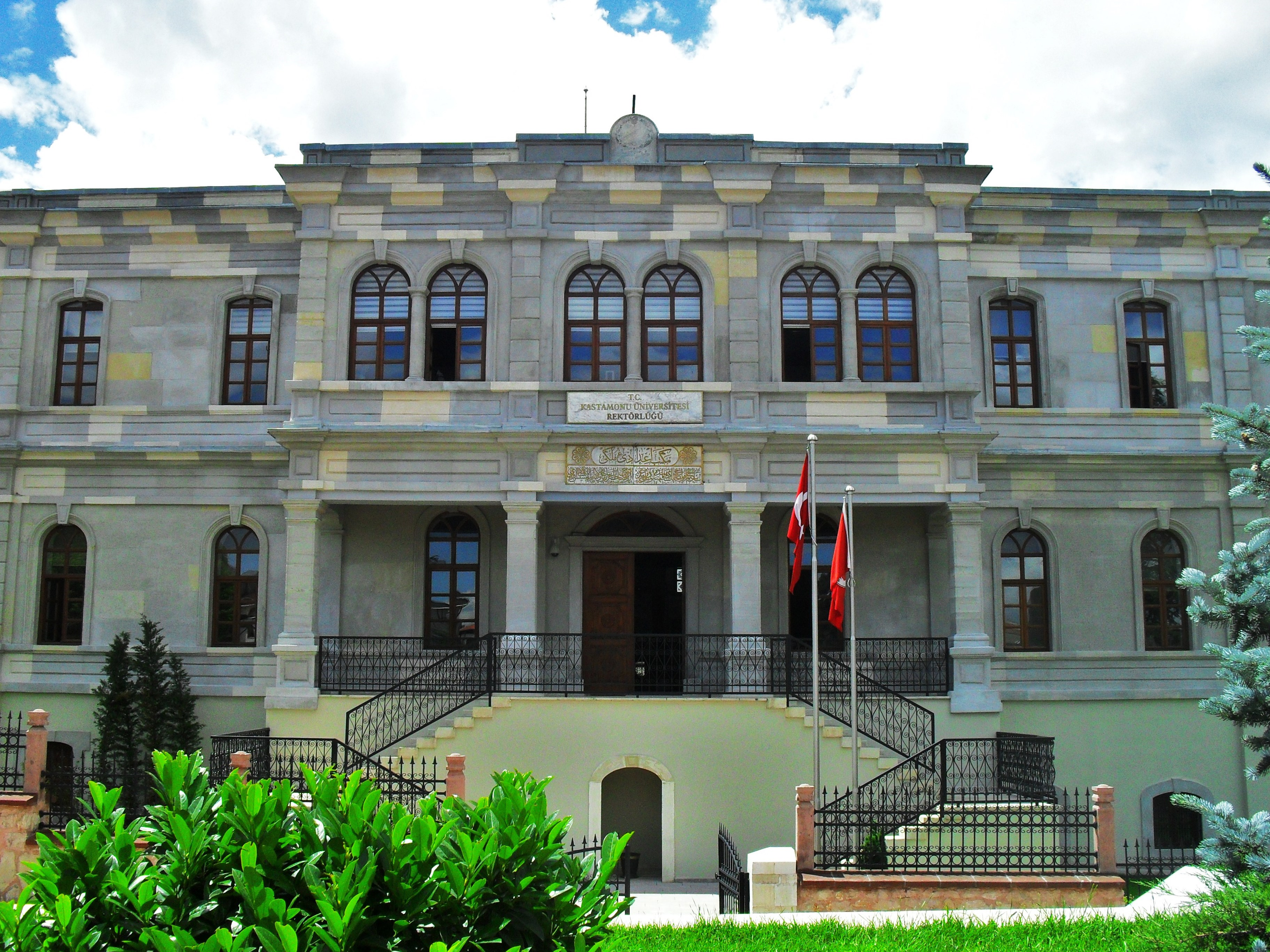
Kastamonu University.

Kastamonu University (Turkish: Kastamonu Üniversitesi) is a public university located in Kastamonu and some of its districts, Turkey. It was established in 2006 after some colleges and schools in Kastamonu, which were administered by Ankara University and Gazi University, were gathered under one institution.

== History ==
The university was founded under the Turkish law no. 5467, which was enacted on March 1, 2006. The university initially had Faculty of Science and Arts, Faculty of Education, Faculty of Forestry, School of Health, School of Physical Education and Sports and Vocational School of Higher Education to open in 2006. The university started its education in Fall 2006. First class with baccalaureate degrees will graduate in May 2010.

== Academics ==
Today, the university employs 748 faculty (professors, associate professors, assistant professors and lecturers), and 159 administrative personnel. It currently has about 21.378 students. Kastamonu University's expansion is under way and many construction works are still ongoing. It currently has four faculties, four schools, three vocational school, two institutes.

Faculties

- Faculty of Education
- Faculty of Forestry
- Faculty of Arts and Sciences
- Faculty of Economics and Administrative Sciences

Faculty of Engineering Faculty of Science ...

Schools

- School of Health
- School of Physical Education and Sports

Vocational Schools

- Kastamonu Vocational School of Higher Education

Institutes

- Institute of Science
- Institute of Social Sciences

== Expansion ==
With the regulation of the University Senate and approval of The Higher Education Council; works related to the foundation of Faculty of Communication, Faculty of Economic and Administrative Sciences, School of Tourism and Hotel Management and vocational schools in the districts of Kastamonu (Abana, Araç, Cide, İnebolu, Taşköprü and Tosya) are being carried on.

== Campus life and student clubs ==
Social and cultural activities in Kastamonu University are performed both in university and in the faculties and school of higher education. In order for the students to spend their spare time in the best way, artistic activities are exhibited and amateur works are promoted and supervised. Works prepared and exhibited by the students are open to public. Spring festival and the Newroz/Nevruz festival are regularly celebrated at the university. During these festivals, students’ stand for sales and presentation, sports activities, movies and theatre shows, various contests, panels, conferences, symposiums, fashion shows and concerts attract many visitors. In addition, Kastamonu University hosts entertainment programmes, concerts, exhibitions, movies, productions and other cultural activities throughout the year. Entertainment activities include musical and theatrical performances, folk dances and live concerts. The students can attend these activities free of charge. Cultural activities take place in the conference hall in Kuzeykent Campus.

40 km (25 mi) south of campus, Kastamonu has Ilgaz Mountains which hosts one of the best winter sports centers in Turkey. Besides other sports, much importance is given to winter sports. Students and trainers who have an interest in skiing, snowboarding, sledding, mountaineering, camping and rock climbing can make good use of the facilities nearby. There are several mountains of 2000+ meters (6000 ft+) altitude in Kastamonu which attract many enthusiasts of skiing and mountaineering. The university organizes weekend trips to the Ilgaz Mountain Ski Resort. Basketball, volleyball, indoor and outdoor football (soccer) fields, tennis, table-tennis and athletics are among the activities provided in our sports center. Sports fields are located in the campus and there are trainers for almost any type sports.

== Student Union ==
Student Union is made of five elected student officials and six representative students from each of the six faculties and schools.

== Dormitories and accommodation ==
There are two dormitories belonging to Turkish Scholarships and Dormitories Institution (Kredi ve Yurtlar Kurumu, KYK), one near the Kuzeykent Campus and the other in the Kastamonu city center. The capacity of the former is 312 male and 400 female students and the capacity of the latter is 244 female students. Both dormitories have such facilities as canteen, cafeteria and restaurant where the students can have breakfast, lunch and dinner. Apart from these dormitories there are many private dorm-style and apartment-style accommodation options available, especially in the city center and near the campus. The construction of a new dormitory building with a capacity of 500 students is still undergoing. The building, which also belongs to KYK, is expected to be completed by mid 2010.

== International Office ==
Kastamonu University International Relations Office serves coordination and consultancy in international platform through coordinating with academic and administrative units of the university. The university participates in the European Union Education and Youth Programmes (Erasmus Programme, Leonardo da Vinci Programme, Grundtvig Programme, Youth Programme). The university has about 10 international students, with the number increasing every semester.

== Affiliations ==
The university is a member of the Caucasus University Association. The university is a member of International Association of Universities - IAU-010164
