= Küre Mountains =

Mountain range in Turkey

Coordinates: 41°45′N 34°06′E

Küre Mountains (Turkish: Küre Dağları, formerly İsfendiyar Mountains) is a mountain range in the Black Sea Region, Turkey. It stretches close and parallel to the central part of the southern coast of the Black Sea, from around Sinop to Inebolu.

== See also ==
- Küre Mountains National Park
