= Küre Mountains National Park =

National park in Turkey

- Küre Dağları Milli Parkı
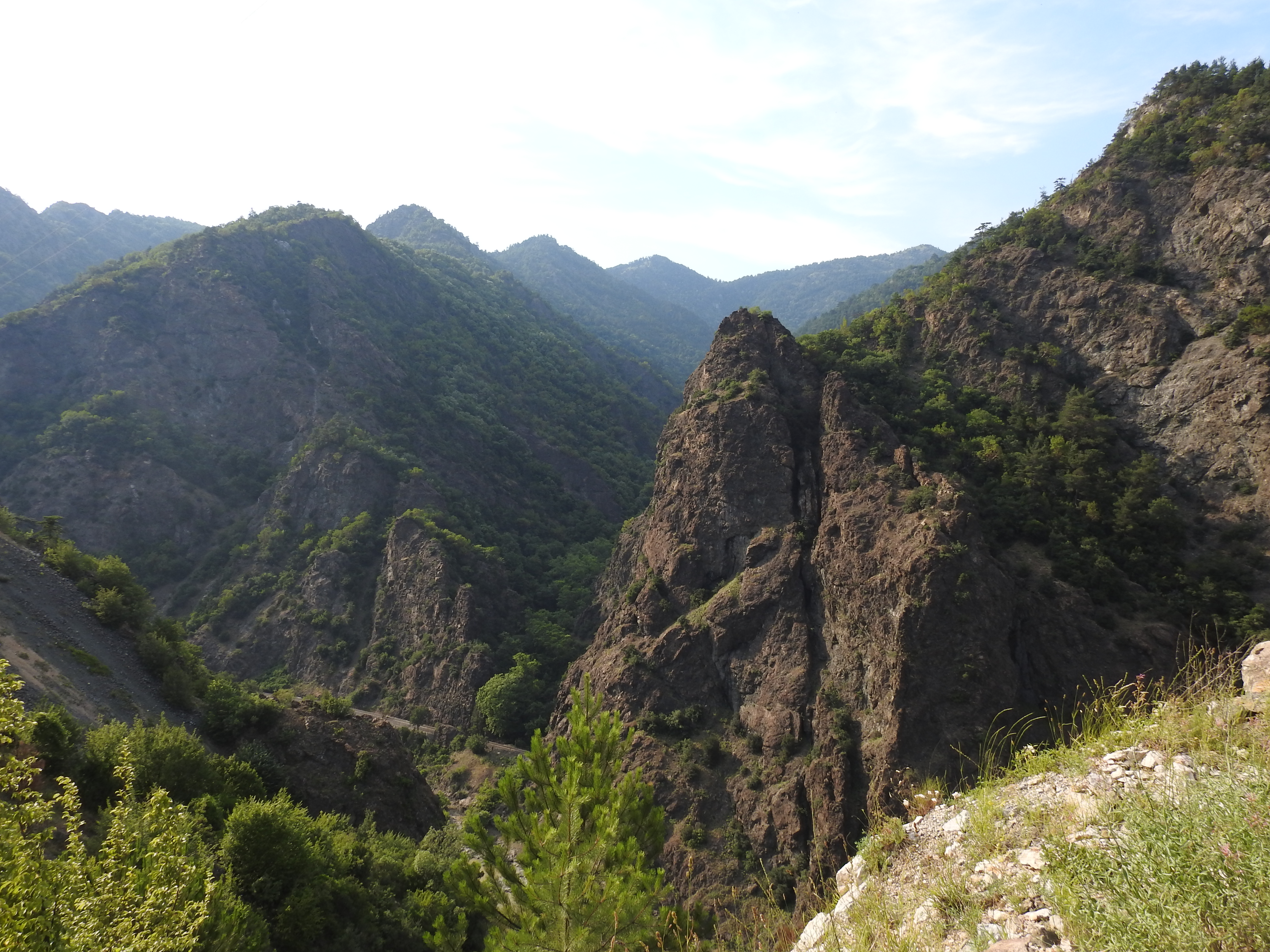
- Küre Mountains

- Location within Turkey
- Location: Pınarbaşı, Cide, Şenpazar in Kastamonu Province - Ulus in Bartın Province, Turkey
- Coordinates: 41°39′20″N 33°09′22″E
- Area: 37,753 ha (93,290 acres)
- Established: July 7, 2000
- Governing body: Ministry of Forest and Water Management
- Website: www.milliparklar.gov.tr/mp/kuredaglari/index.htm

Küre Mountains National Park (Turkish: Küre Dağları Milli Parkı), in the Black Sea Region of Turkey, was established in 2000. The national park stretches over the mountain range of Küre Mountains and is located in the districts Pınarbaşı, Cide, Şenpazar, Azdavay, Kurucaşile, Ulus, and Amasra, of the Kastamonu and Bartın provinces. It contains within the borders of the Black Sea Region, extending from the west bank of the Bartın River to the east bank of the Kızılırmak River, covering a distance of 300 kilometers. The Küre Mountains National Park (KMNP) is one of Turkey's 41 national parks, covering 80,000 hectares of protected area featuring diverse terrain and ecosystems. Within its boundaries lies a core zone of 37,753 ha (93,290 acres) with an average elevation of 500 m (1,600 ft).

The Küre Mountains National Park (KMNP) has a diverse landscape and varied topographical structure that houses a wealth of habitats and ecosystems. The park's significance lies in its rich biodiversity values, habitats, canyons, caves, fountains, waterfalls, cultural values. In addition to its natural assets, KMNP is a destination for ecotourism in Turkey, attracting visitors drawn to its folkloric values and the presence of traditional wooden houses.

KMNP stands as a natural conservation area, among Turkey's largest protected areas, featuring old-growth forest formations. It is considered as an endangered 'humid forest eco-systems under the influence of the black climate sea' which includes a variety of habitats such as mixed forests of fir and beech, sea and coastal habitats, grasslands, and rocky areas. It also recognized as one of the 100 Forest Hot Spots of Europe that require protection as falls within 200 eco-regions, globally identified by the WWF.

== History ==
As part of the Euro-Siberian, Mediterranean and Irano-Turanian phytogeographical regions and KMNP serves as a physical and social threshold. In 1988, Küre Mountains National Park was designated as one of the priority areas for protection by the World Wide Fund for Nature (WWF), with contributions from the Turkish department.

From 1998 and 2000, the Turkish Ministry of Forestry conducted 'The Project on Management of National Parks and Protected Areas, the Preservation of Biological Diversity and Rural Development' under the United Nations Development Programme (UNDP) and the Food and Agriculture Organization. Under the framework of this project, began the phase of conservation in this area. The park was established on July 7th, 2000.

The Küre Mountains lie among the temperate forests of North Anatolia and the Eastern Black Sea Mountain System. Of this expanse, around 37,000 hectares have been designated as a "National Park", with a primary aim to conserve nature and a buffer zone. The term "buffer zone" was incorporated into Turkey's conservation agenda and was brought under official protection in 2000. As a result of these efforts, the National Park Administration of Küre Mountains oversees the management of the national park. It operates under the authority of the Regional Directorate of Forestry and Water Affairs in Sinop, falling under the General Directorate of Nature Conservation and National Parks of the Ministry of Forestry and Water Affairs. These operations are governed by the National Parks Law, numbered 2873, aims to conserve biodiversity.

== Ecotourism ==
The Küre Mountains region is nationally and internationally renowned for its abundant biodiversity and extensive old-growth forest formations, making it a prime destination for eco-tourist groups to visit the area. With the designation of the national park, tourism development in KMNP began in the early 2000s which raised concerns due to the lack of adequate infrastructure services by the Turkish government. In response to this issue, Küre Mountains Ecotourism Project of WWF Turkey and the Zumrut Village Ecotourism Project have successfully worked to manage ecotourism in Turkey's protected areas. Alongside these projects, local people and conservationists were involved in support of protecting their environment. Ecotourism projects opened new job opportunities and alternative livelihoods which were compatible with education, raising awareness, and sustainable resource management for these local communities.

=== Events ===
In 2001, the Pinarbasi Ecotourism Center was introduced to provide tourist training courses and issued 20 local nature guides. Following this event, in 2002, ecotourism guide maps were published to inform domestic and international visitors of the multifunctional forests in the Küre Mountains. Over the period spanning 2001 to 2006, the project facilitated awareness campaigns on sustainable forest use and engaged local communities in managing the national park, identifying ecotourism opportunities such as wildlife watching and hiking. Ecotourism activities generated income, particularly benefiting women, foresters, and unemployed youth, providing alternative livelihoods and enhancing community engagement with nature conservation. These efforts would later on lead to the verification process of the Protected Area Network Park (PAN Parks).

In April 2012, the park was designated as a certified Protected Area Network Park (PAN Parks) as part of the "Enhancing Forest Protected Areas Management System in Turkey Project," supported by the Global Environment Facility (GEF). Under these provisions, well-managed protected areas conducts successful recreational and tourism activities to maintain the national park's natural assets and the cultural wealth of its authentic folkloristic characteristics.

=== Activities ===
- Wildlife observation
- Trekking
- Hiking
- Horseback riding
- Mountain biking
- Caving
- Canyoning
- Rock climbing

== Biodiversity ==
The Küre Mountains are renowned as one of Turkey's most abundant areas for canyons and caves, which played a significant role in the decision to establish the area and its surroundings as a national park. The park provides a rich variety of habitat diversity and old-growth forest formations, which holds significant social and environmental value. The mountain range stands out as one of the most biodiverse in the western Black Sea Region of Turkey, particularly notable for its rich flora and vegetation. It serves as a valuable source of data for understanding the ecological characteristics and competitive abilities of various tree species.

In the western sector of the Küre Mountains, a total of 122 significant plant areas have been identified. There are 157 endemic species, 59 of them being in the red list and 45 plant taxa classified as endangered, with 32 of these classified as rare species. The protected area is also home to 48 out of 160 mammal species.

== Gallery ==
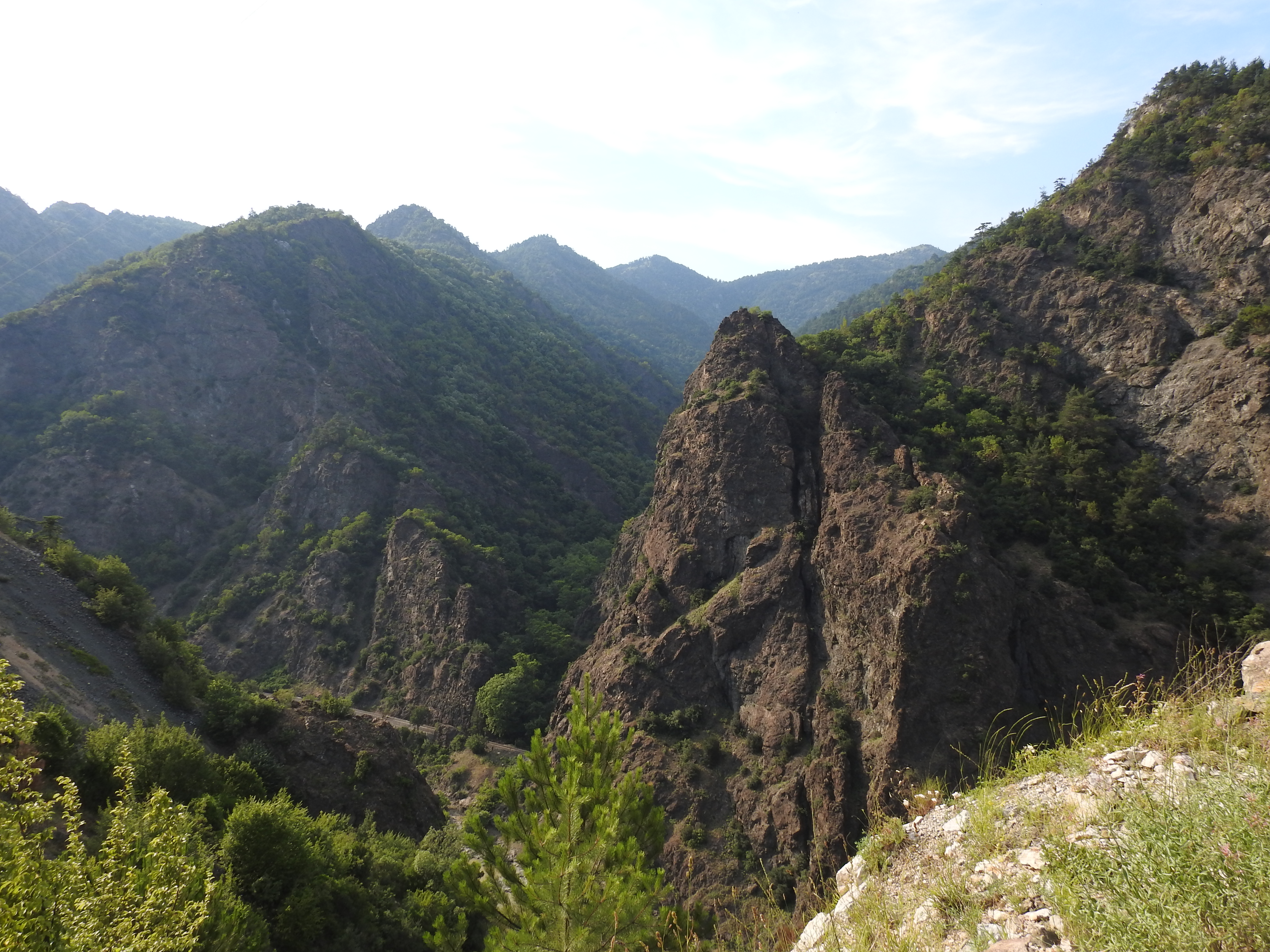
Küre Mountains National Park

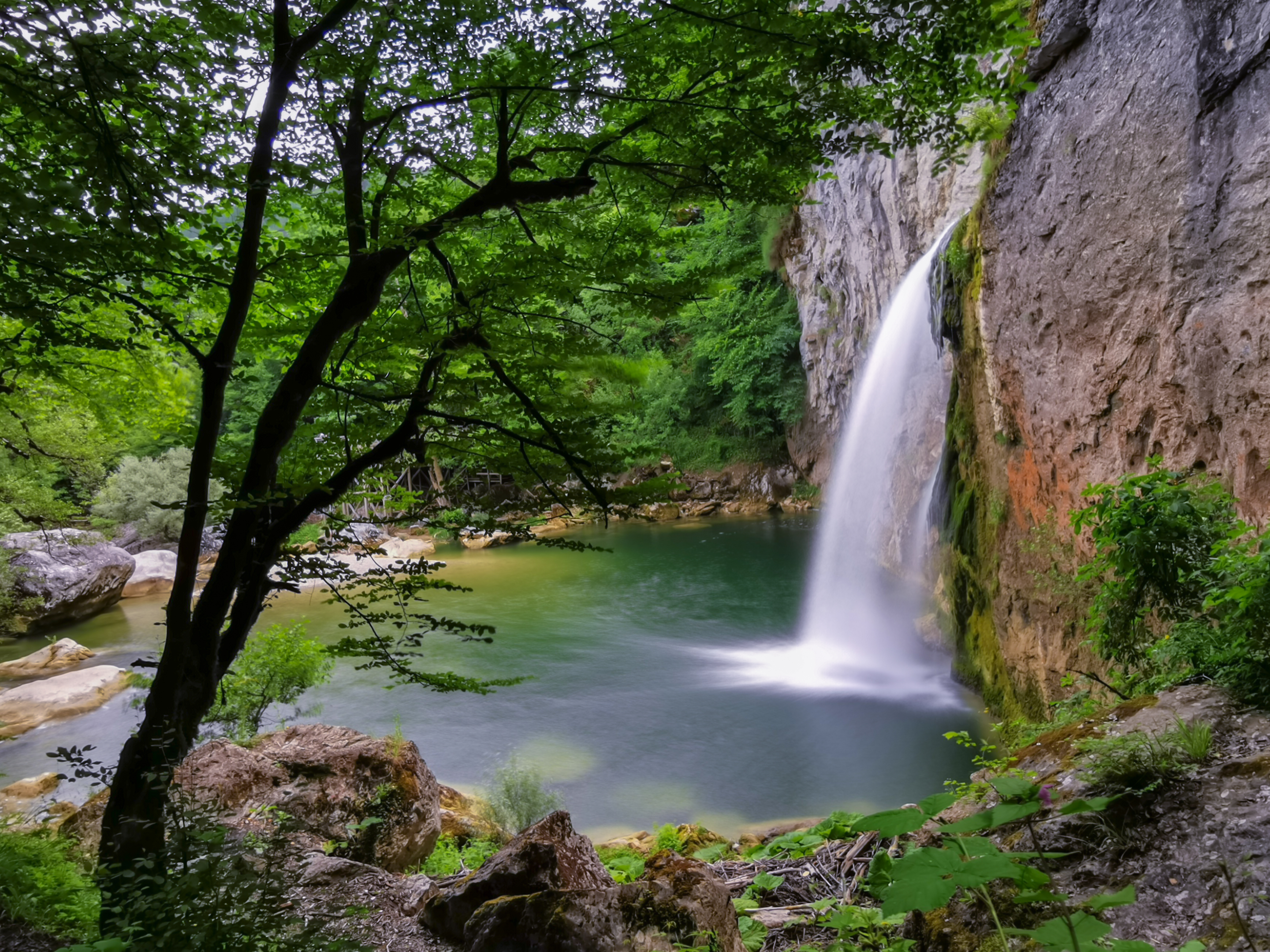
Küre Mountains National Park

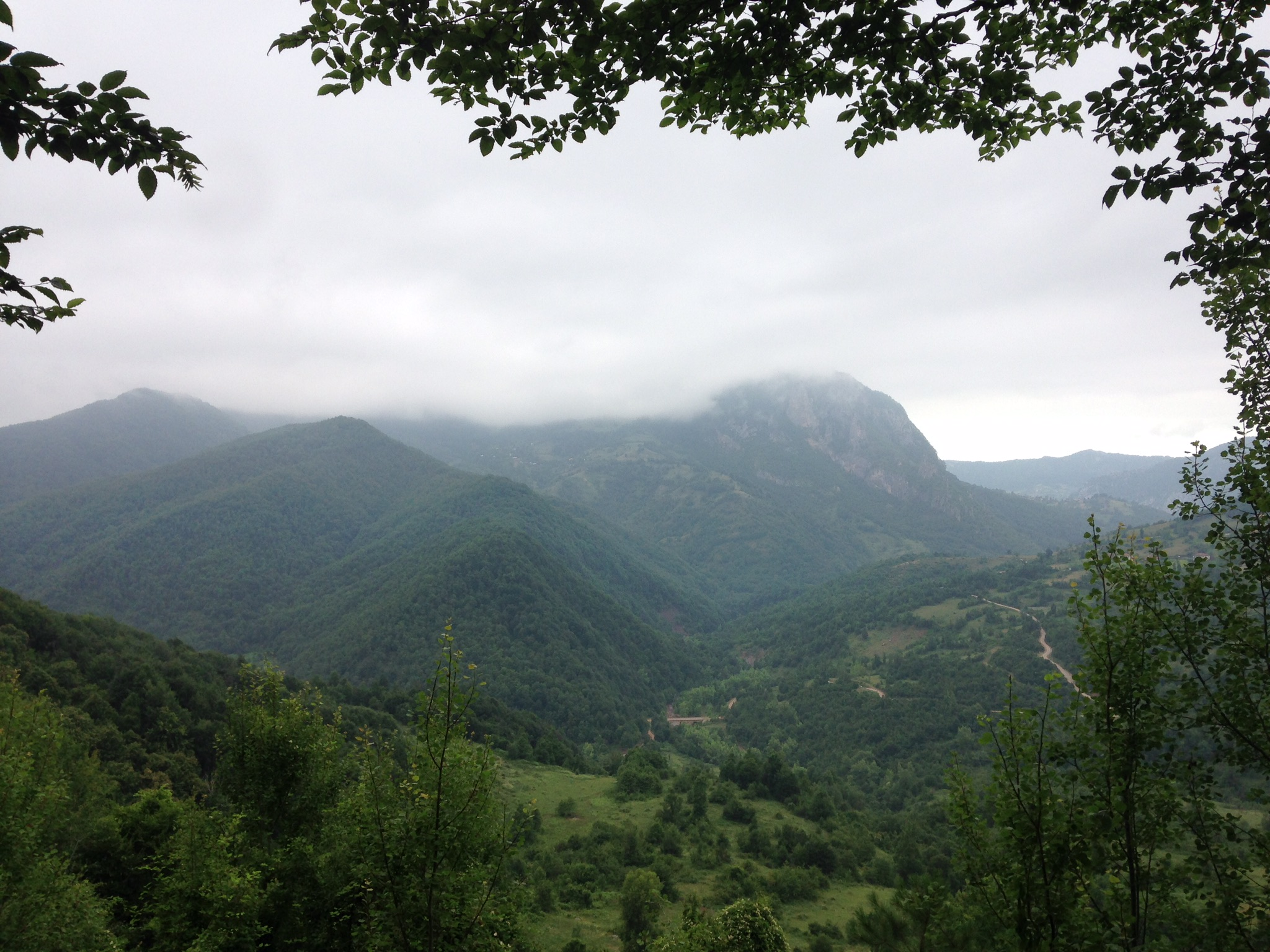
Küre Mountains National Park

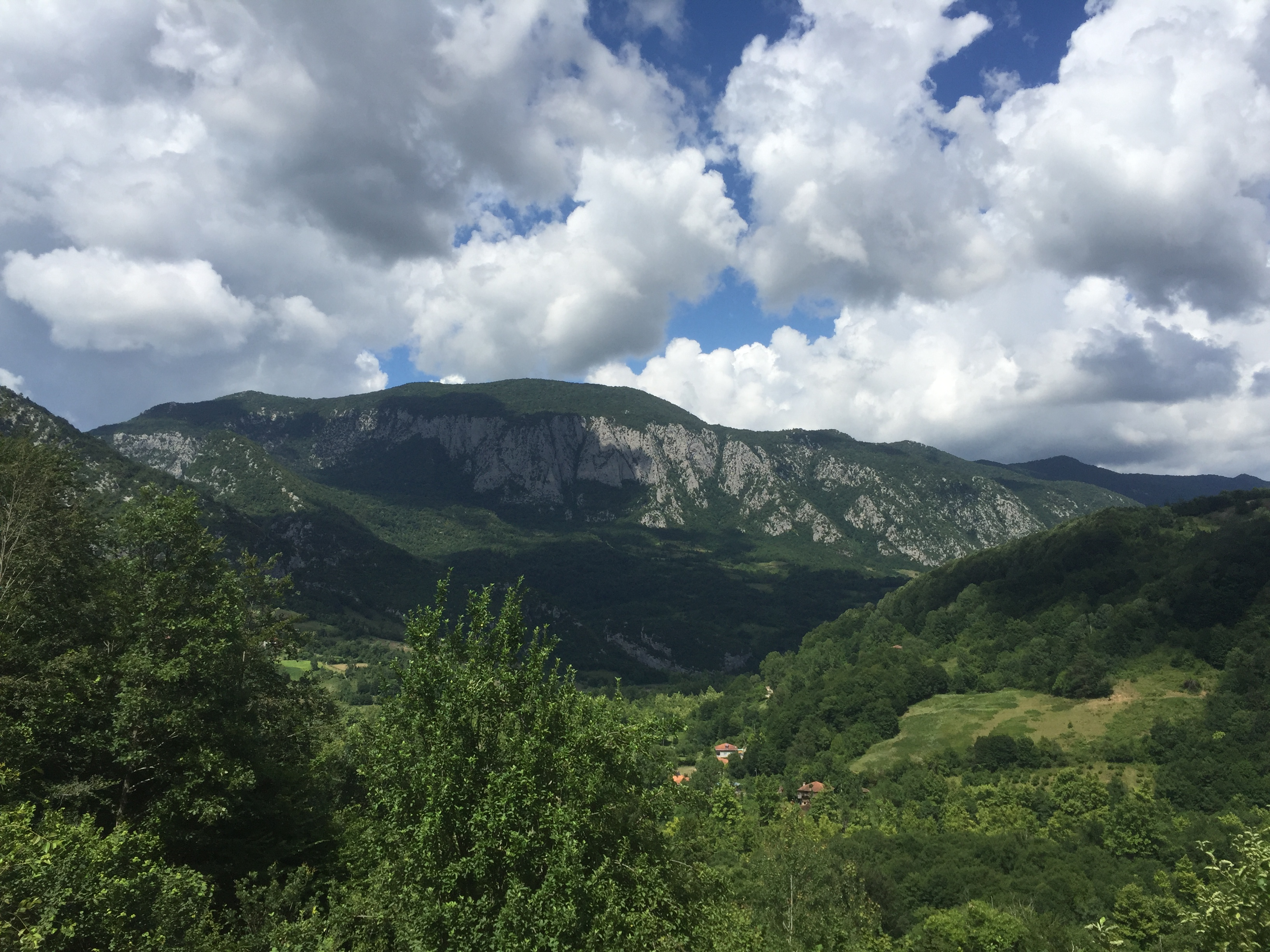
Küre Mountains National Park

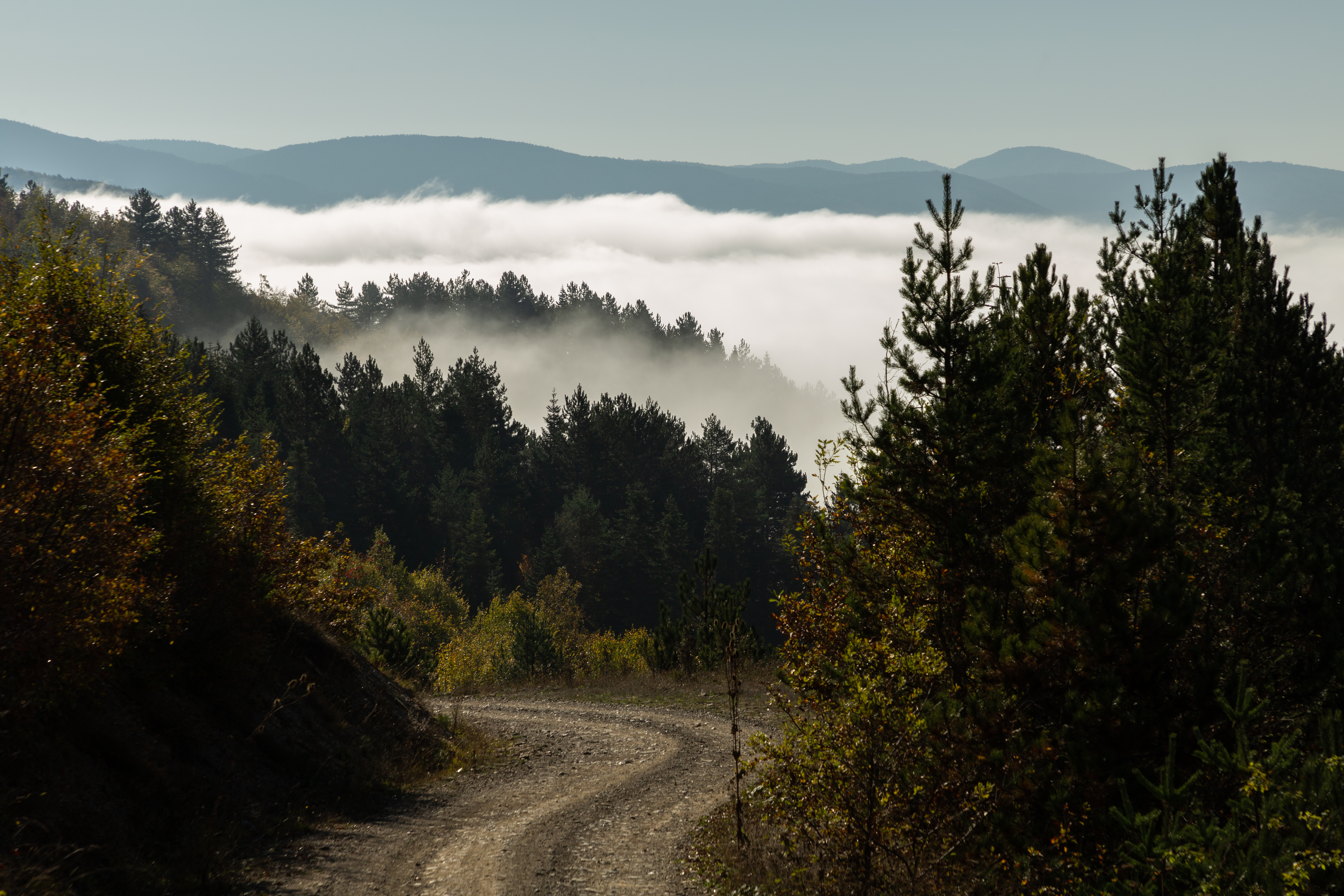
Küre Mountains National Park

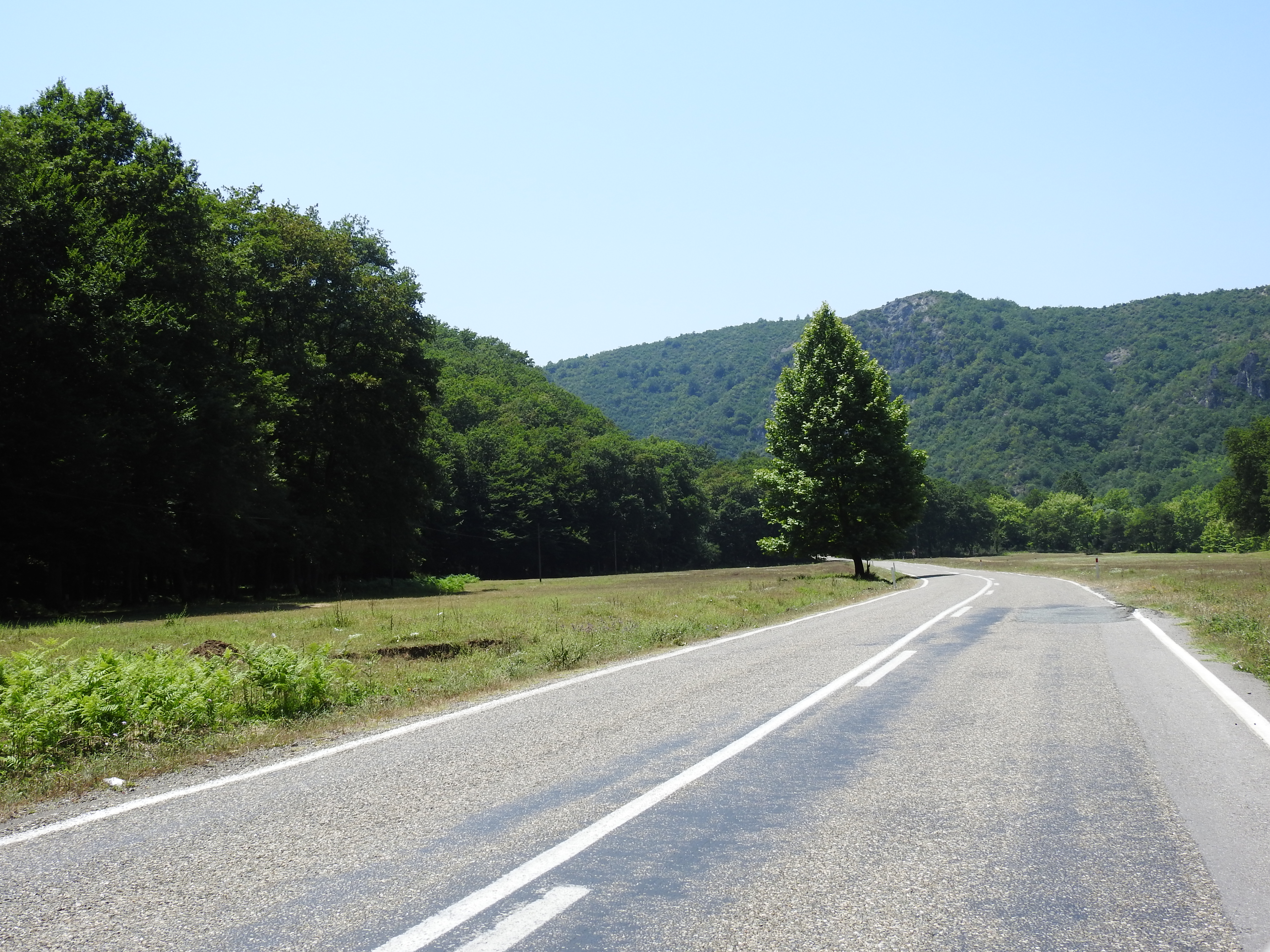
Küre Mountains National Park

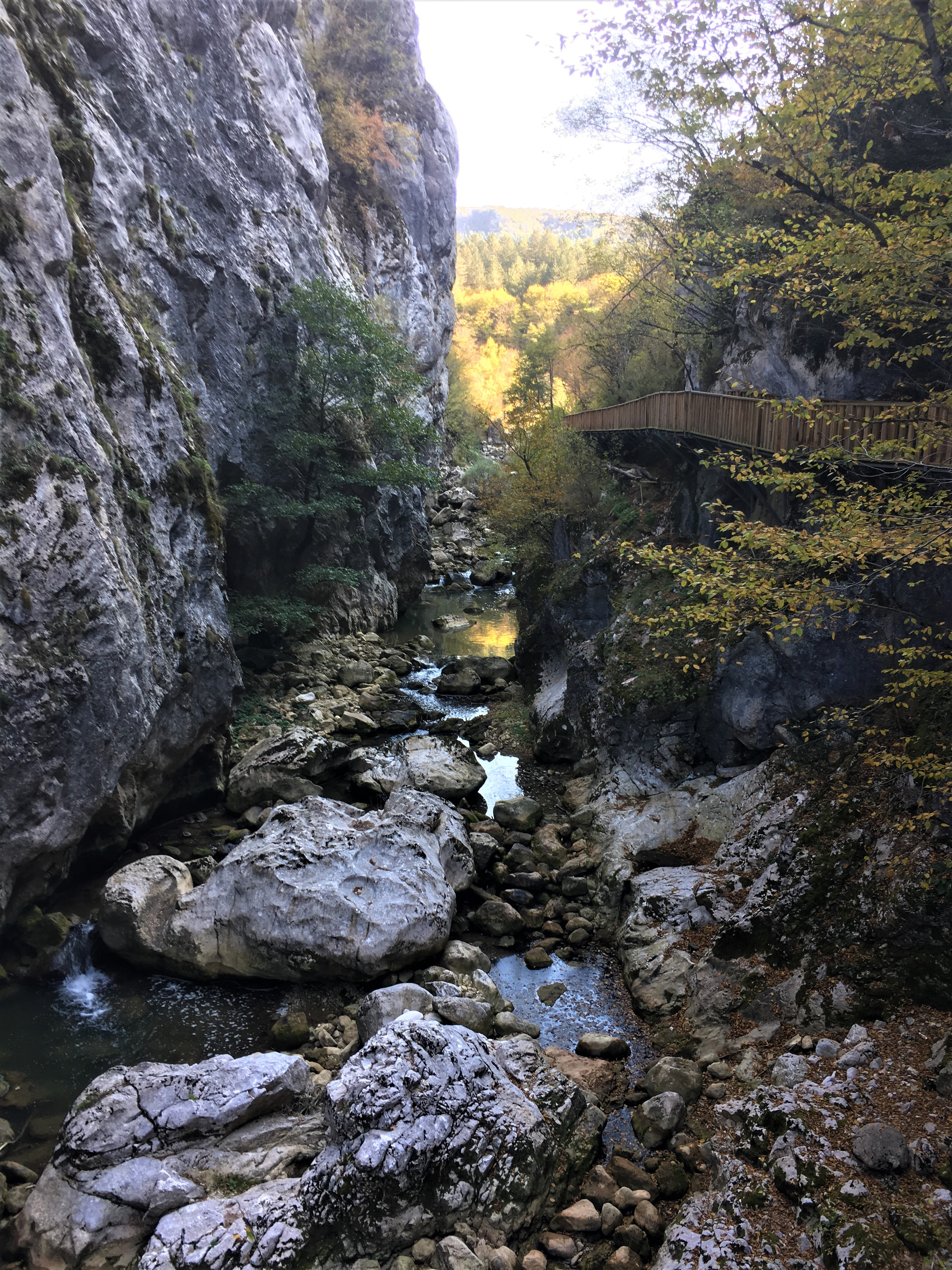
Küre Mountains National Park

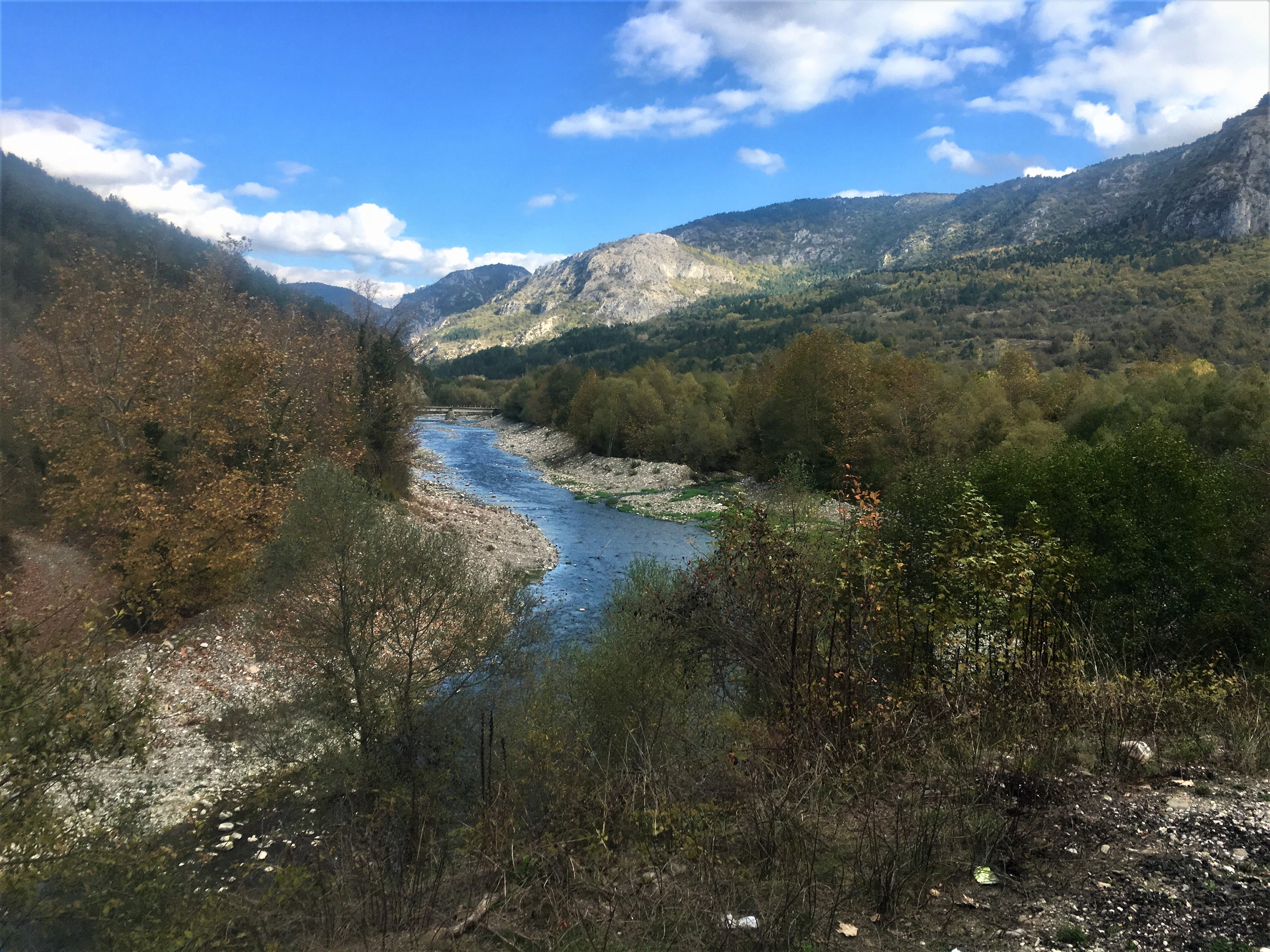
Küre Mountains National Park

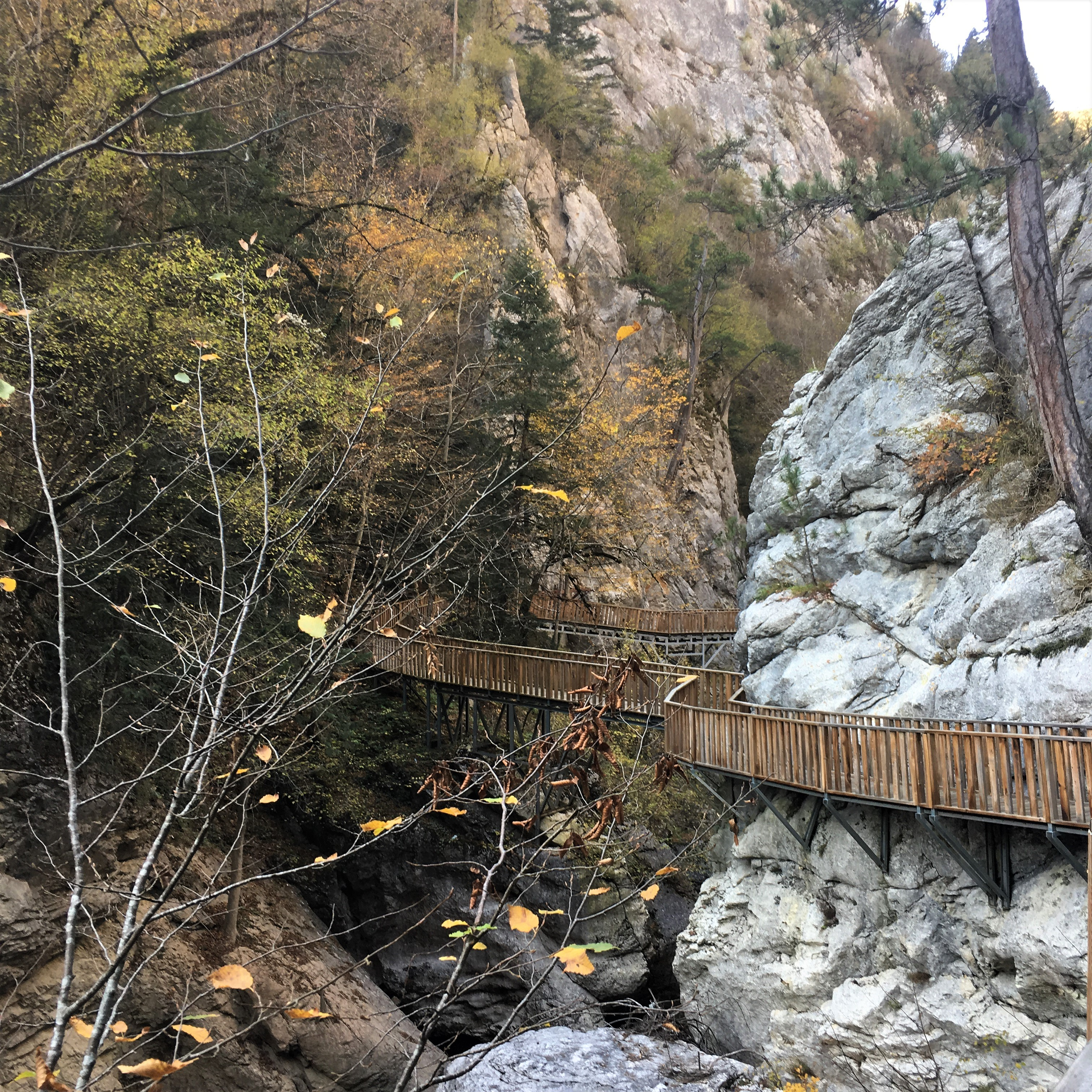
Küre Mountains National Park

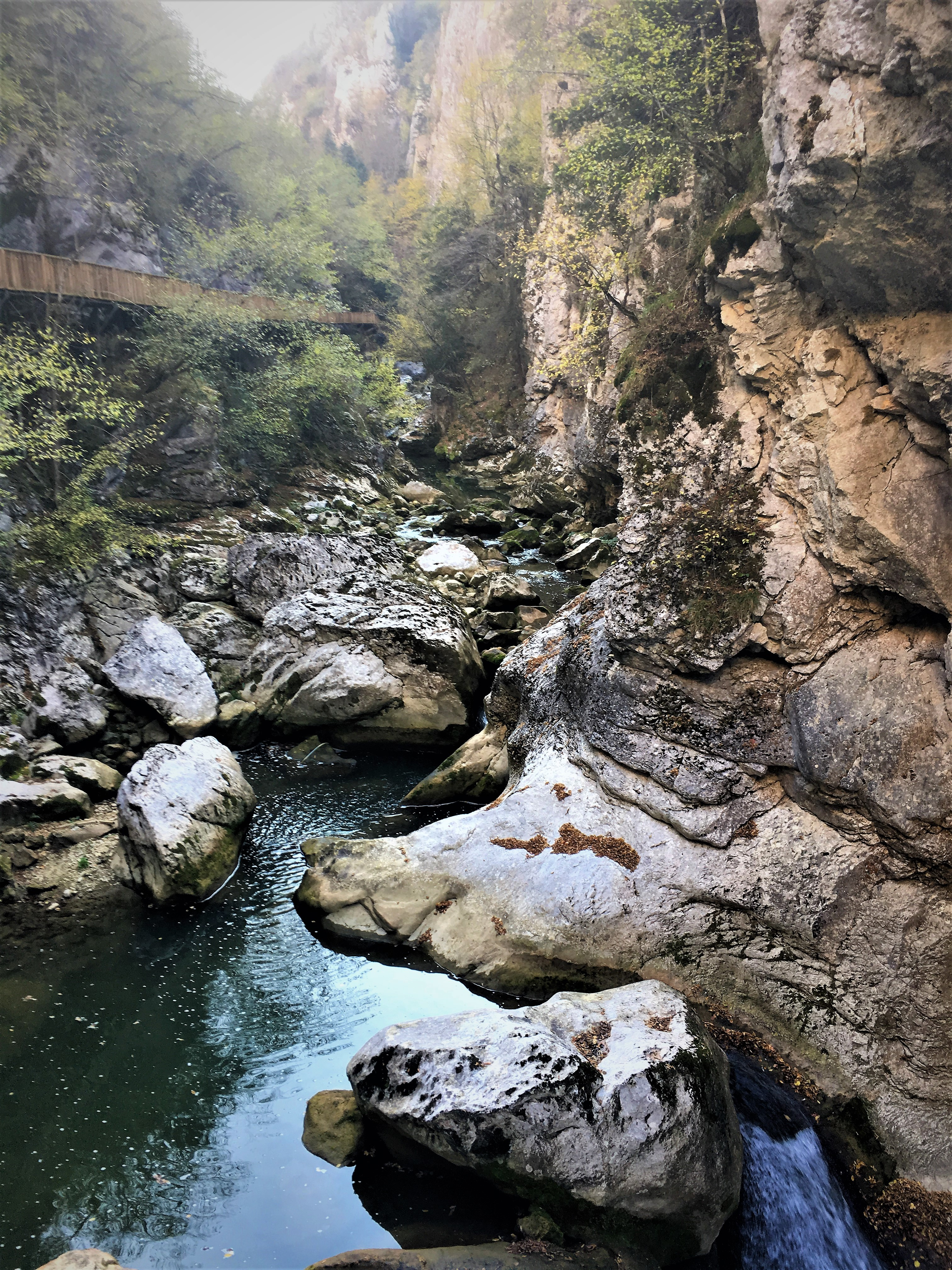
Küre Mountains National Park

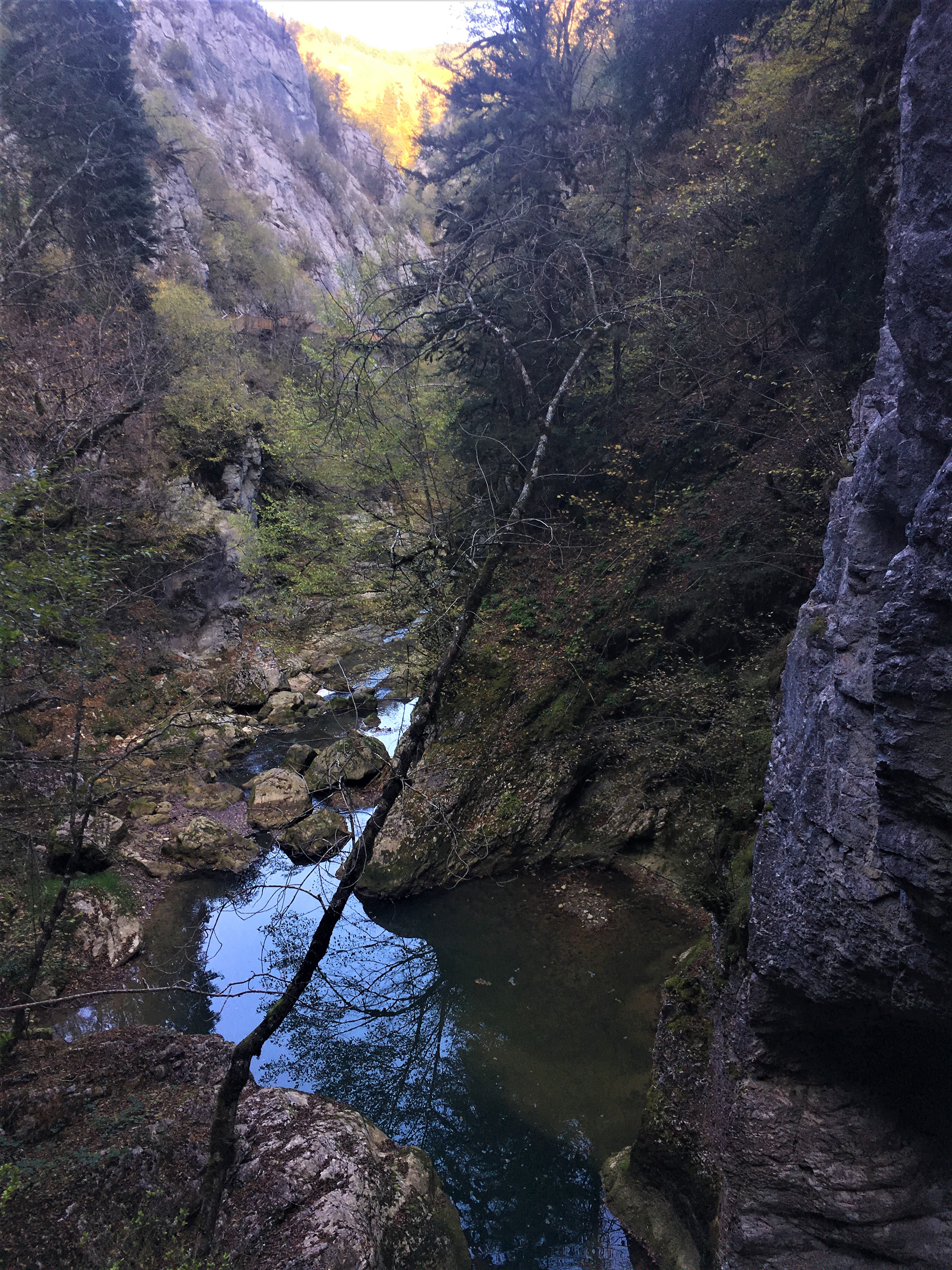

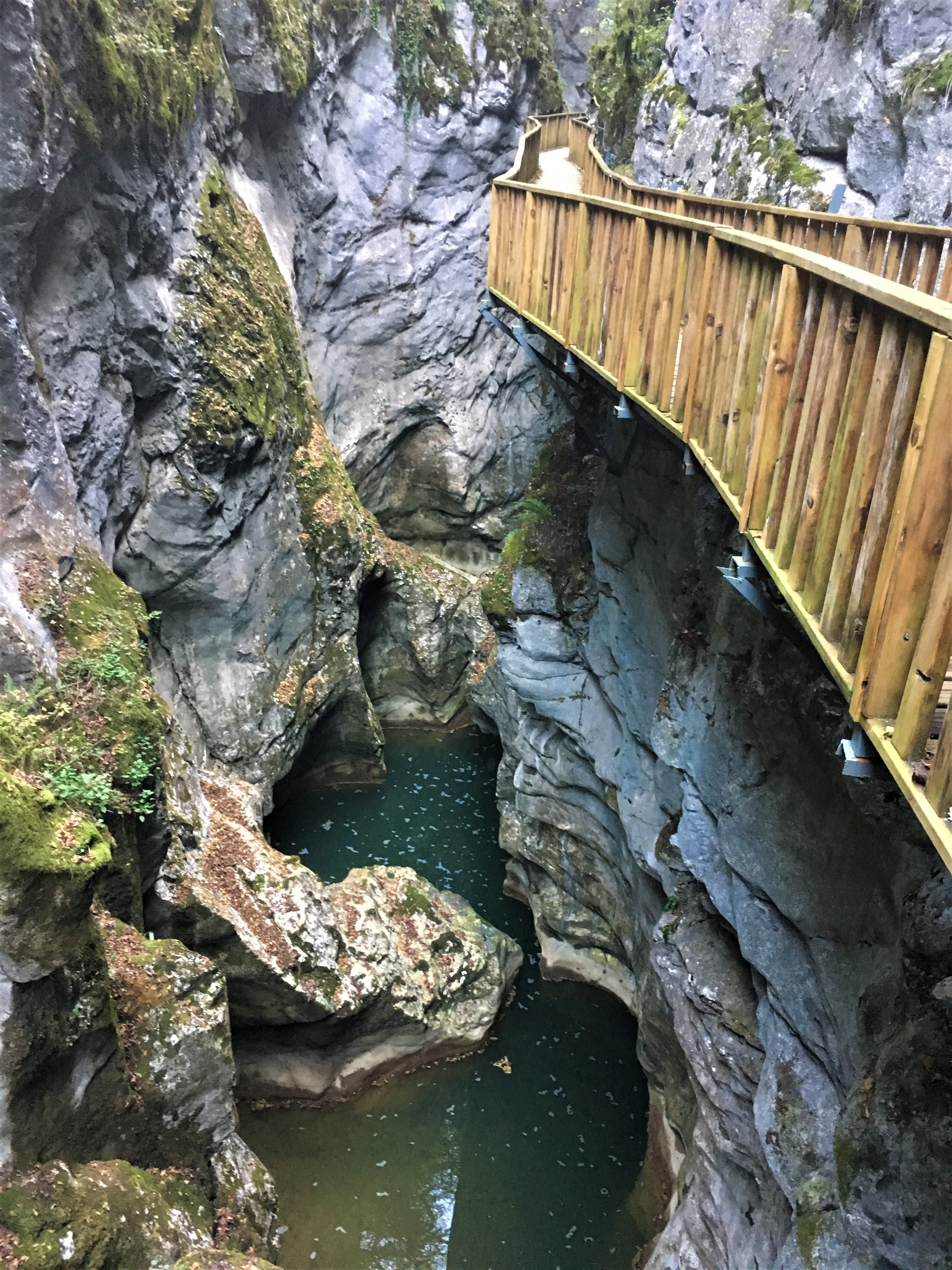

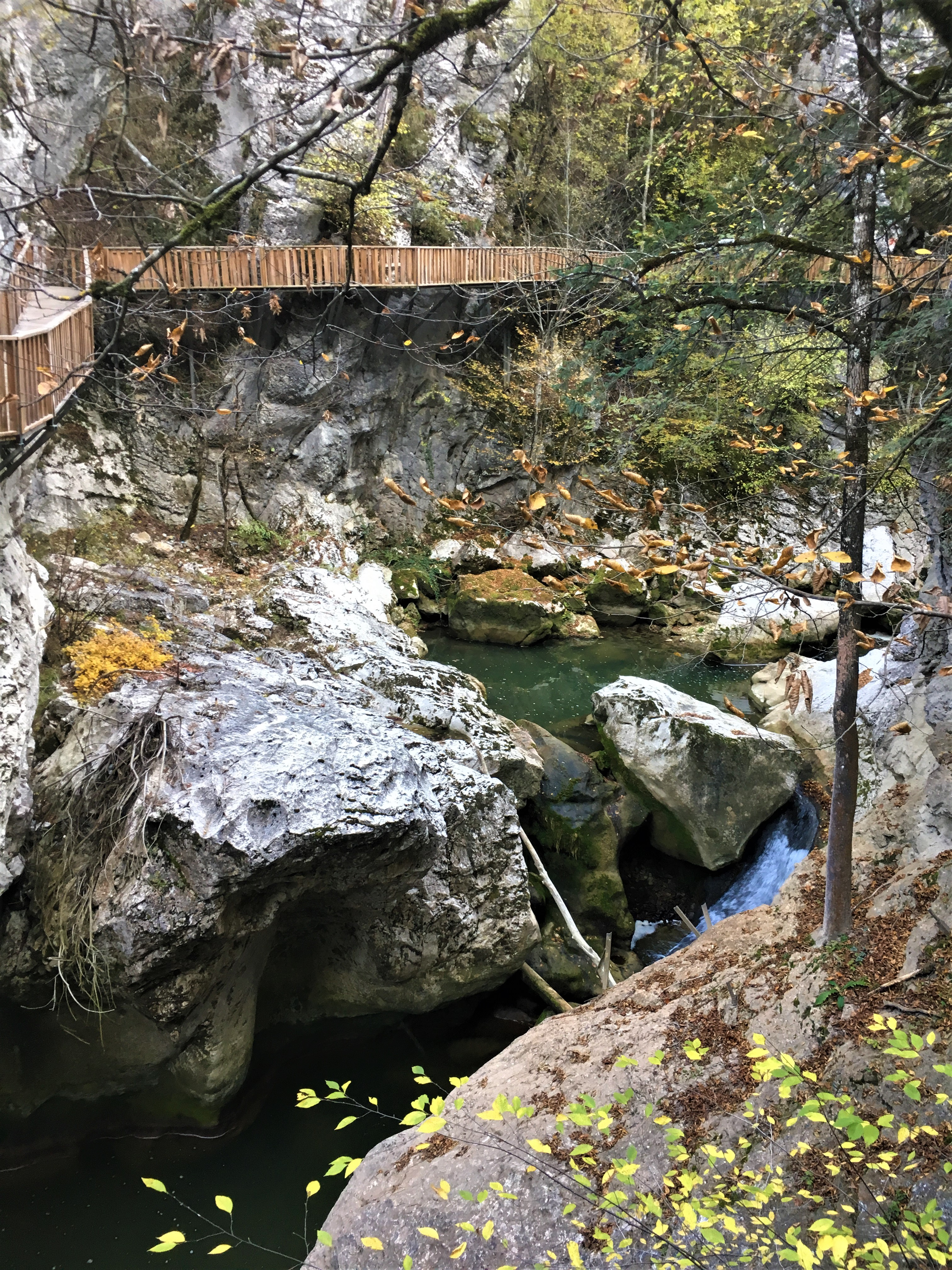

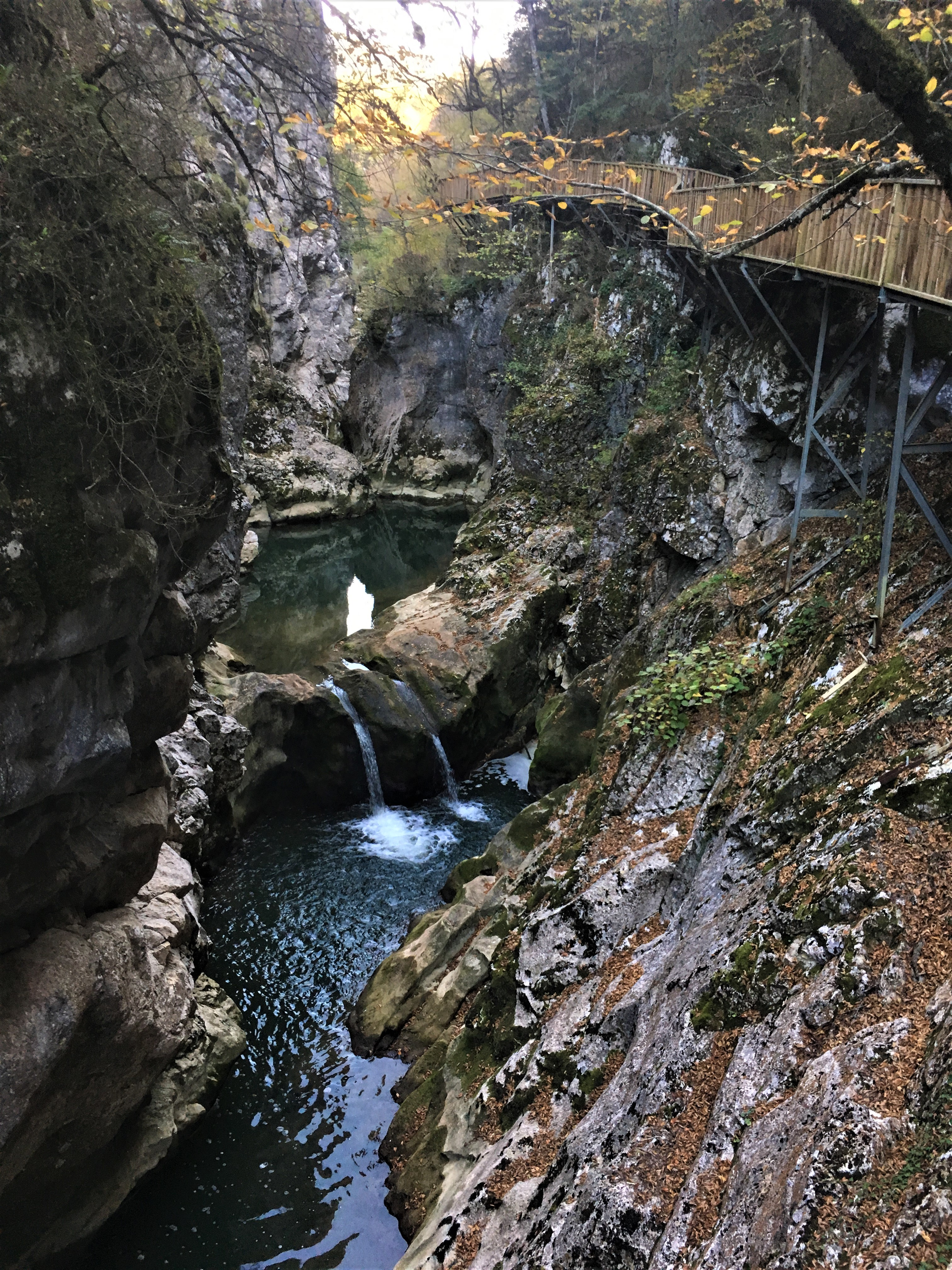

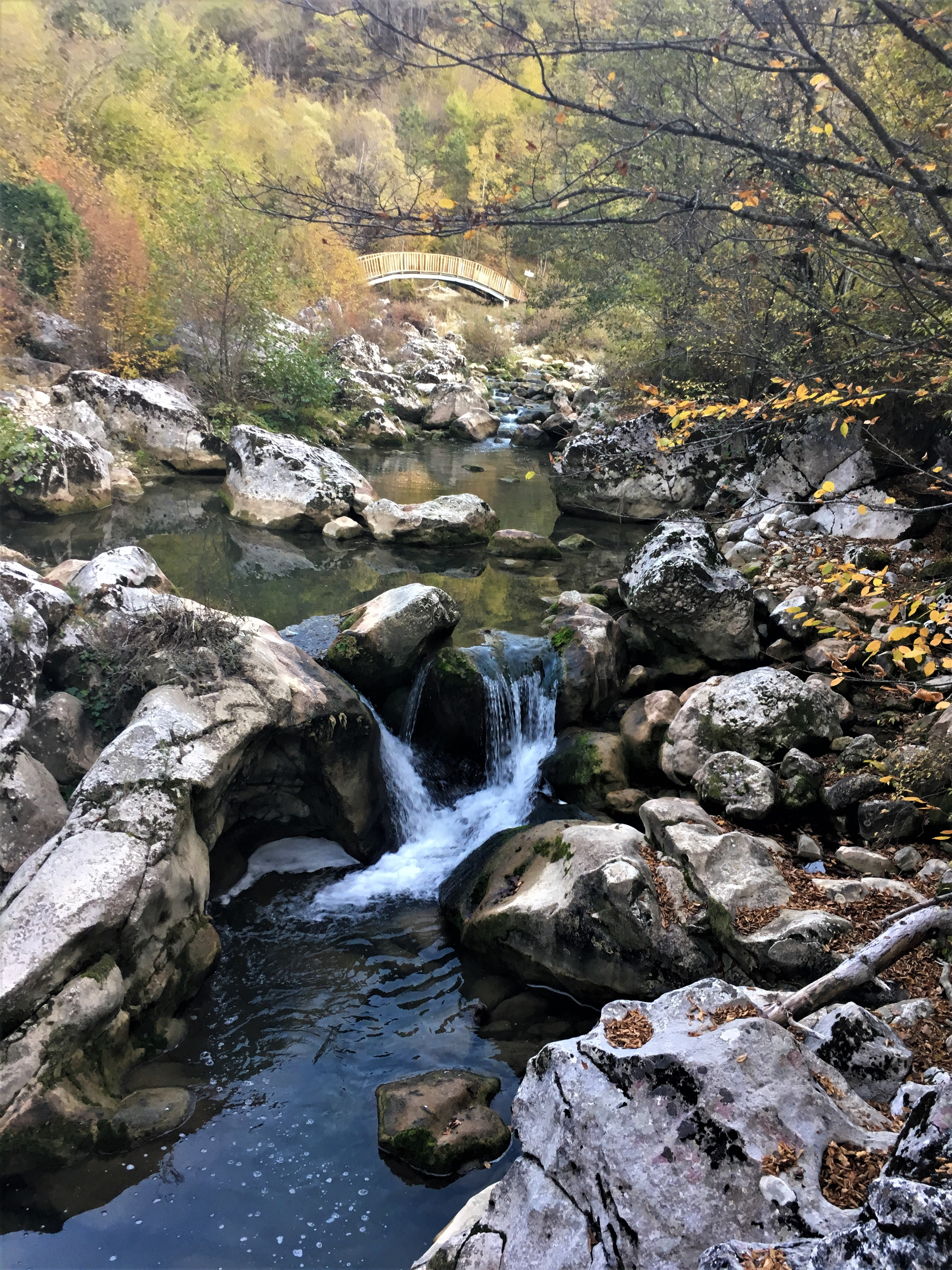

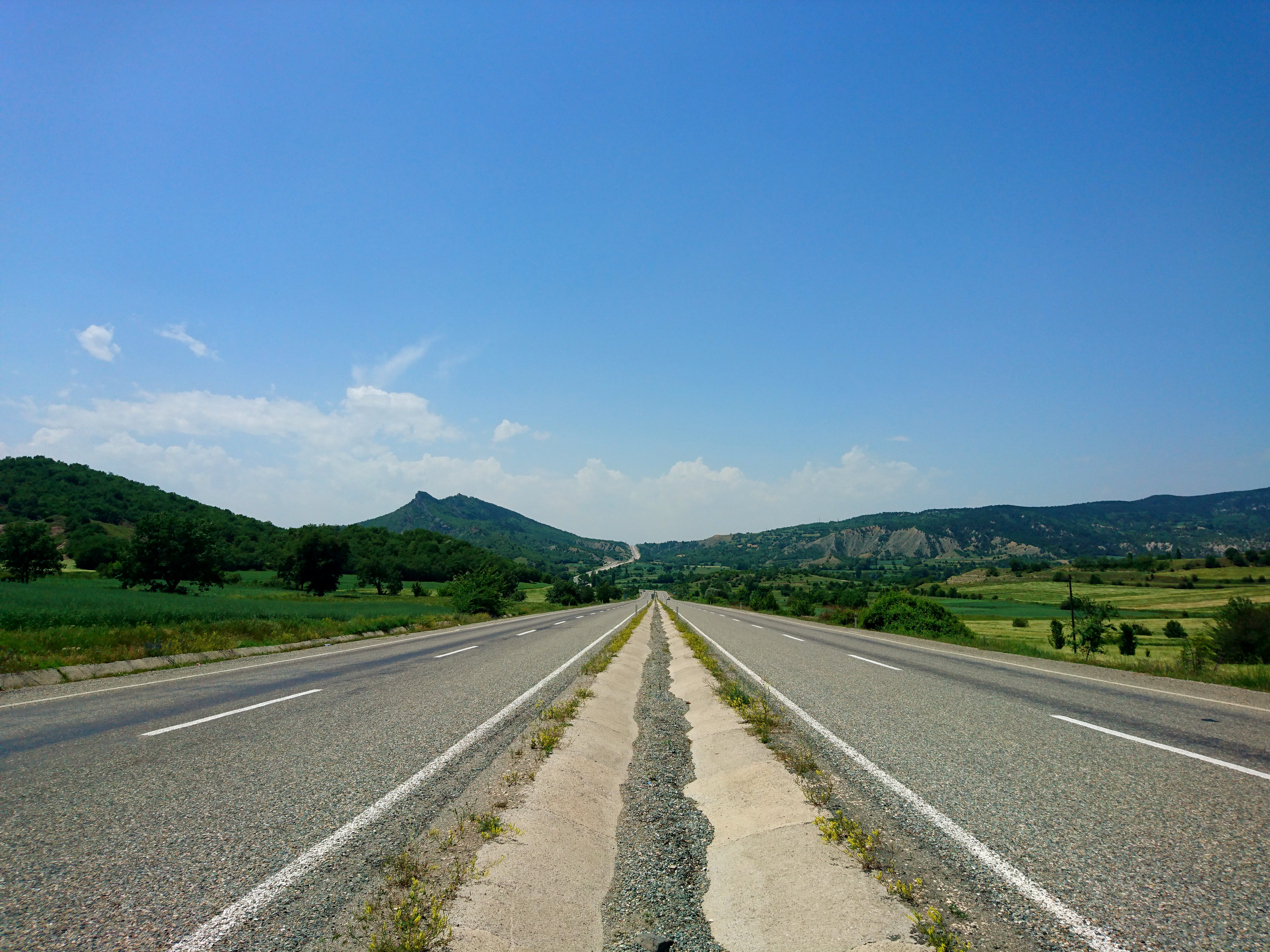

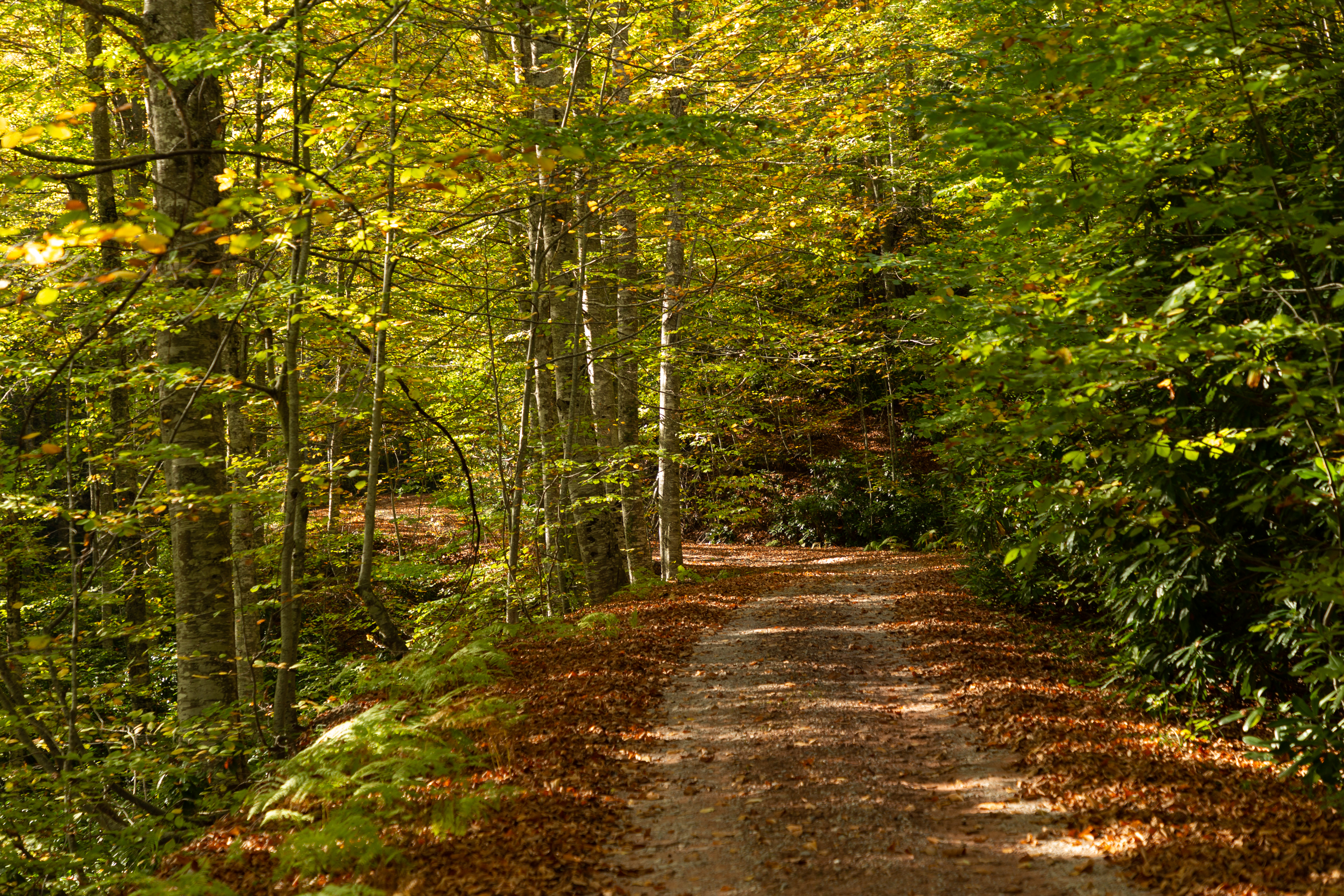

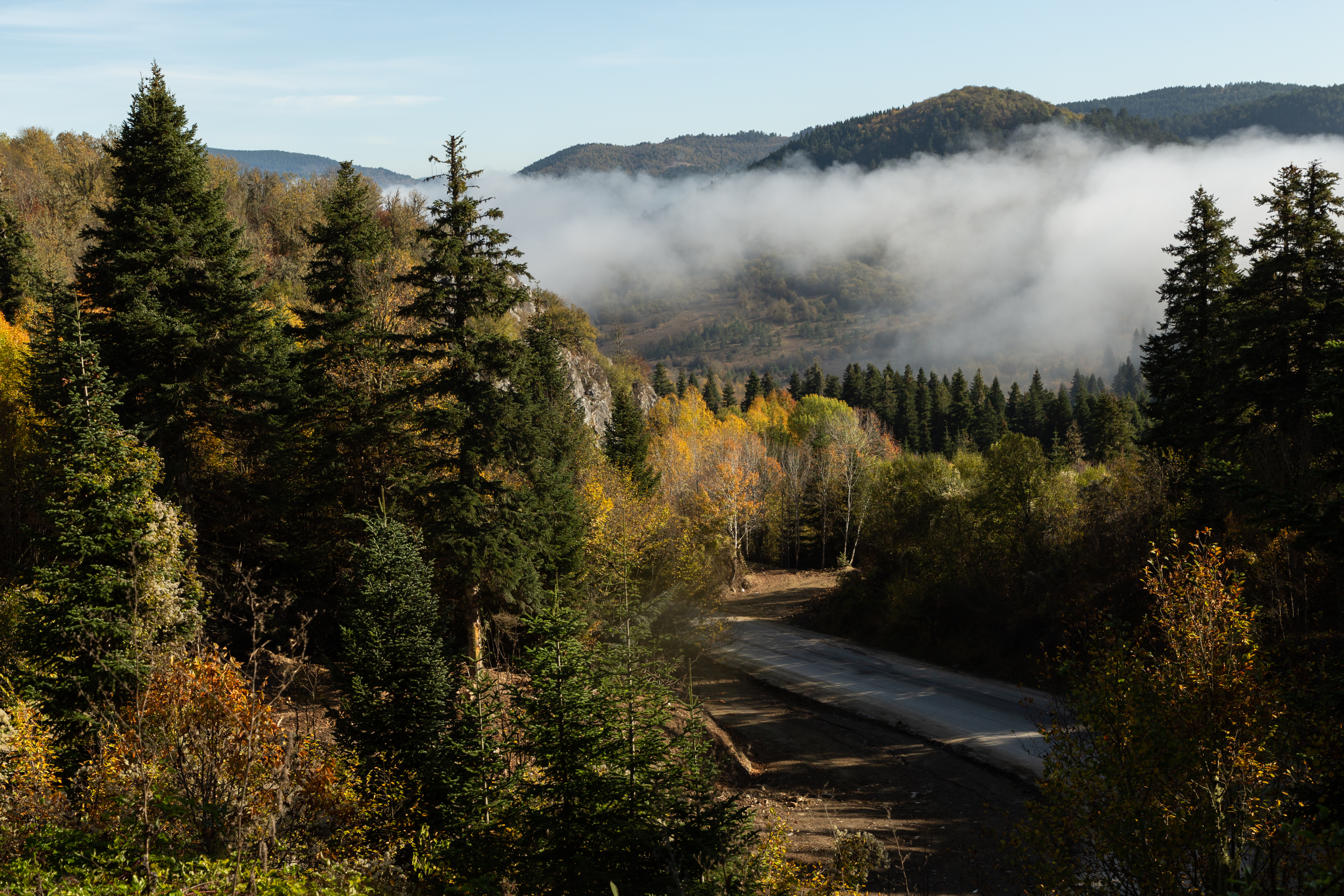

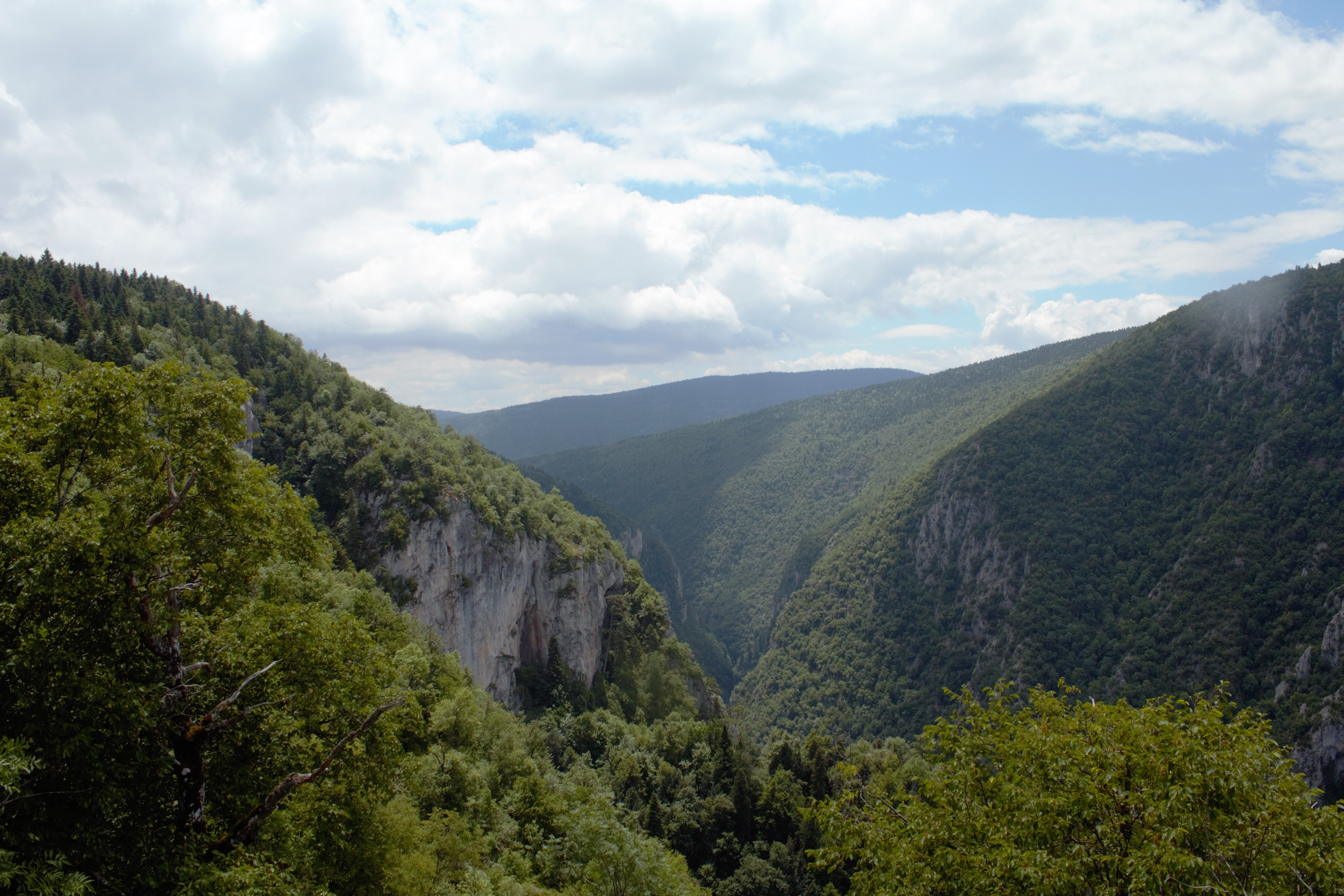
