= Kastamonu =

- Municipality
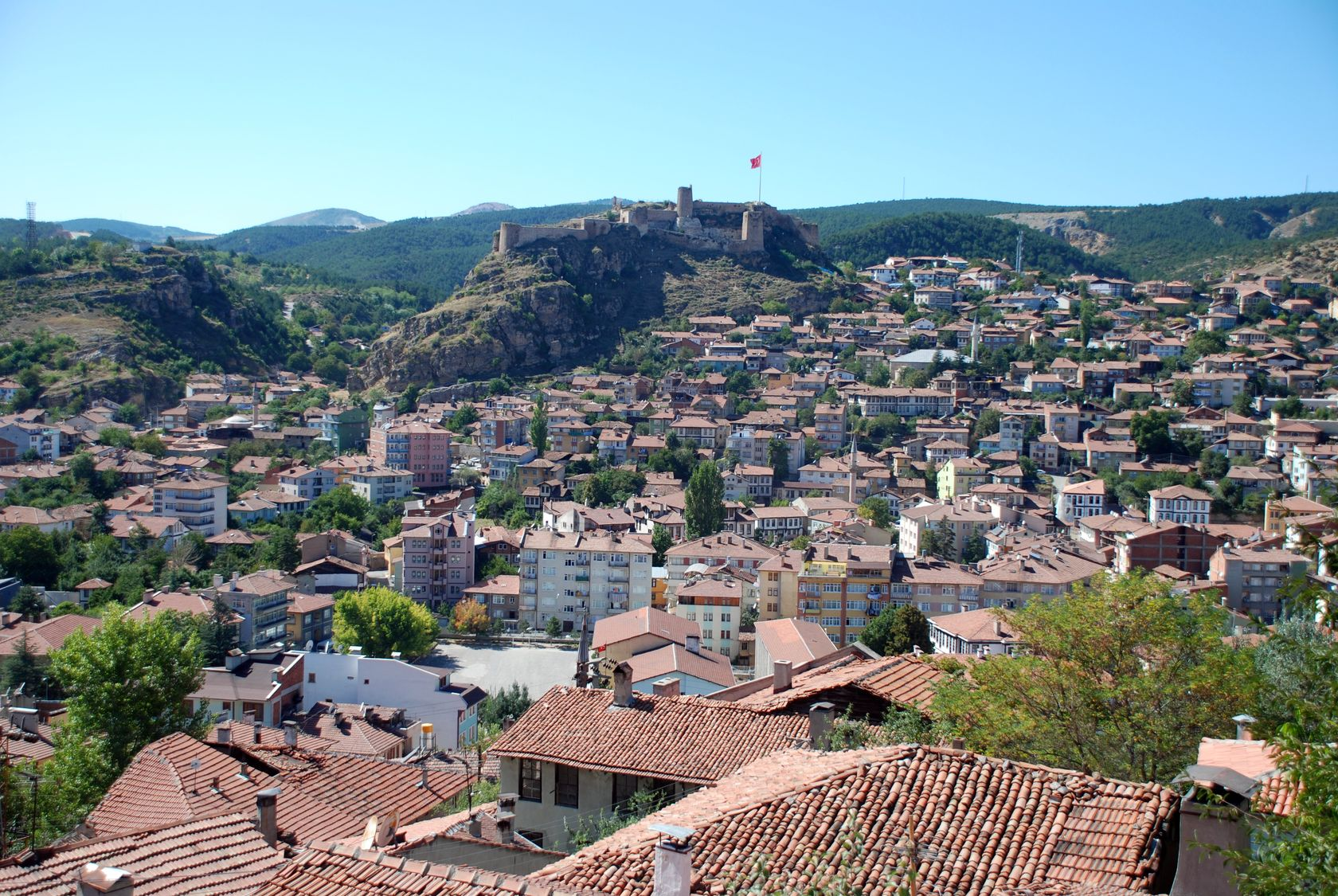
- Kastamonu Castle

- Logo

- Location within Turkey
- Coordinates: 41°22′35″N 33°46′35″E
- Country: Turkey
- Province: Kastamonu
- District: Kastamonu

Government
  - Mayor: Hasan Baltacı (CHP)
- Elevation: 904 m (2,966 ft)
- Population (2021): 125,622
- Time zone: UTC+3 (TRT)
- Area code: 0366
- Climate: Dfb
- Website: www.kastamonu.bel.tr

Kastamonu is a city in northern Turkey. It is the seat of Kastamonu Province and Kastamonu District. Its population is 125,622 (2021). The city lies at an elevation of 904 m (2,966 ft). It is located in the southern part of the province.

== History ==
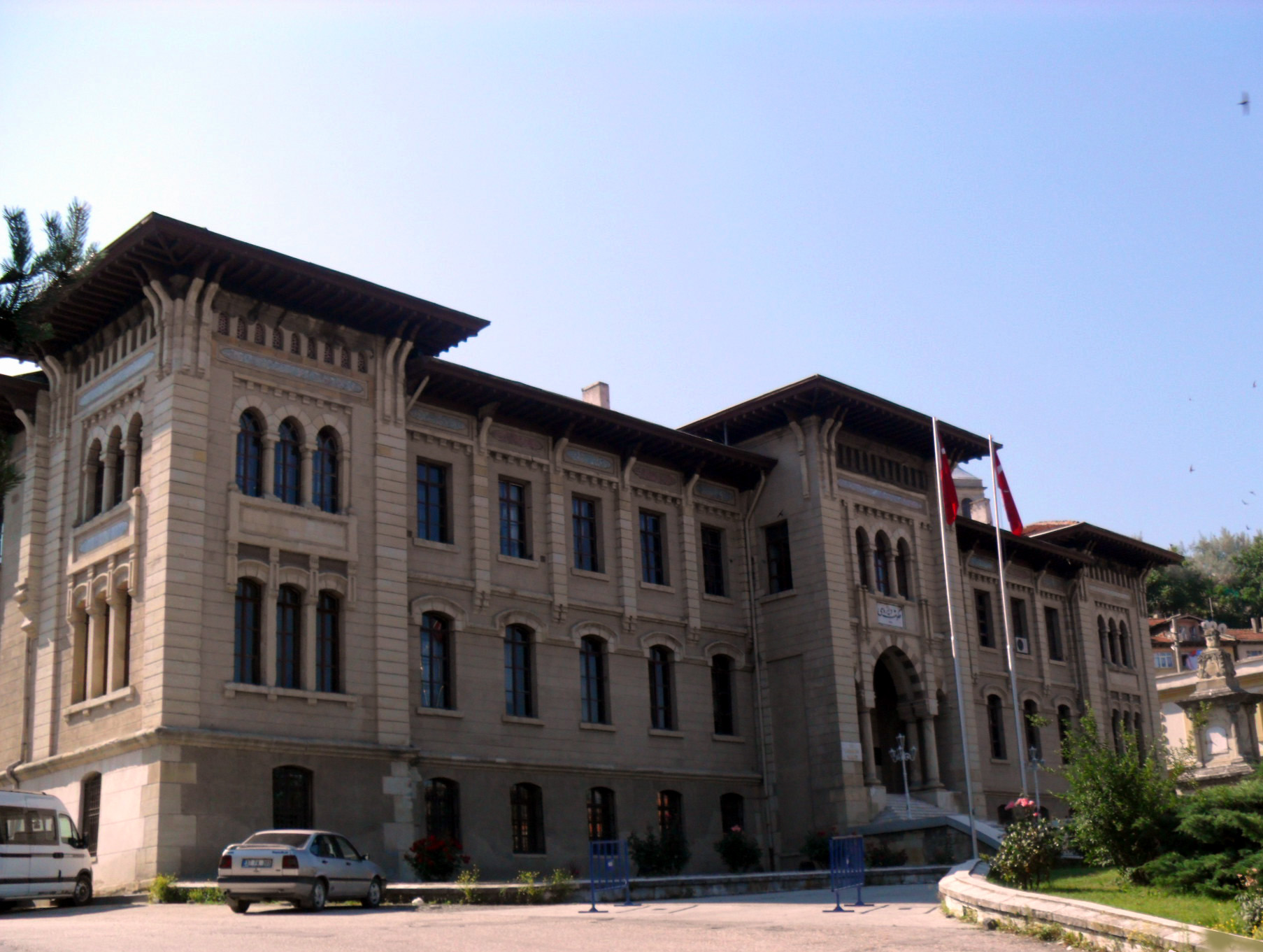
Governor's historical office

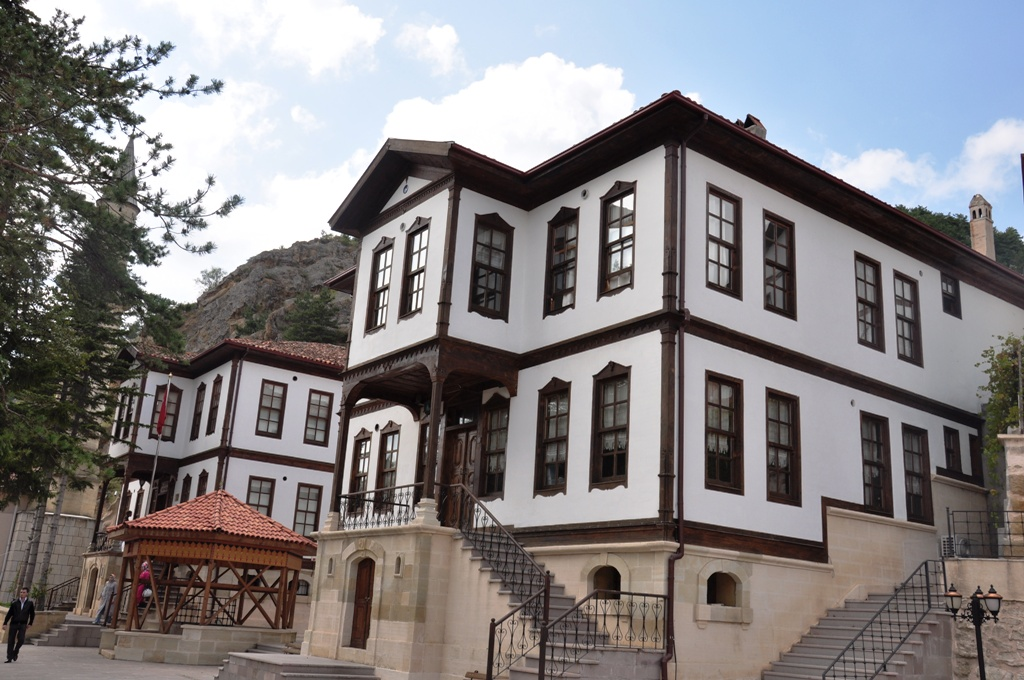
Kastamonu old Ottoman houses

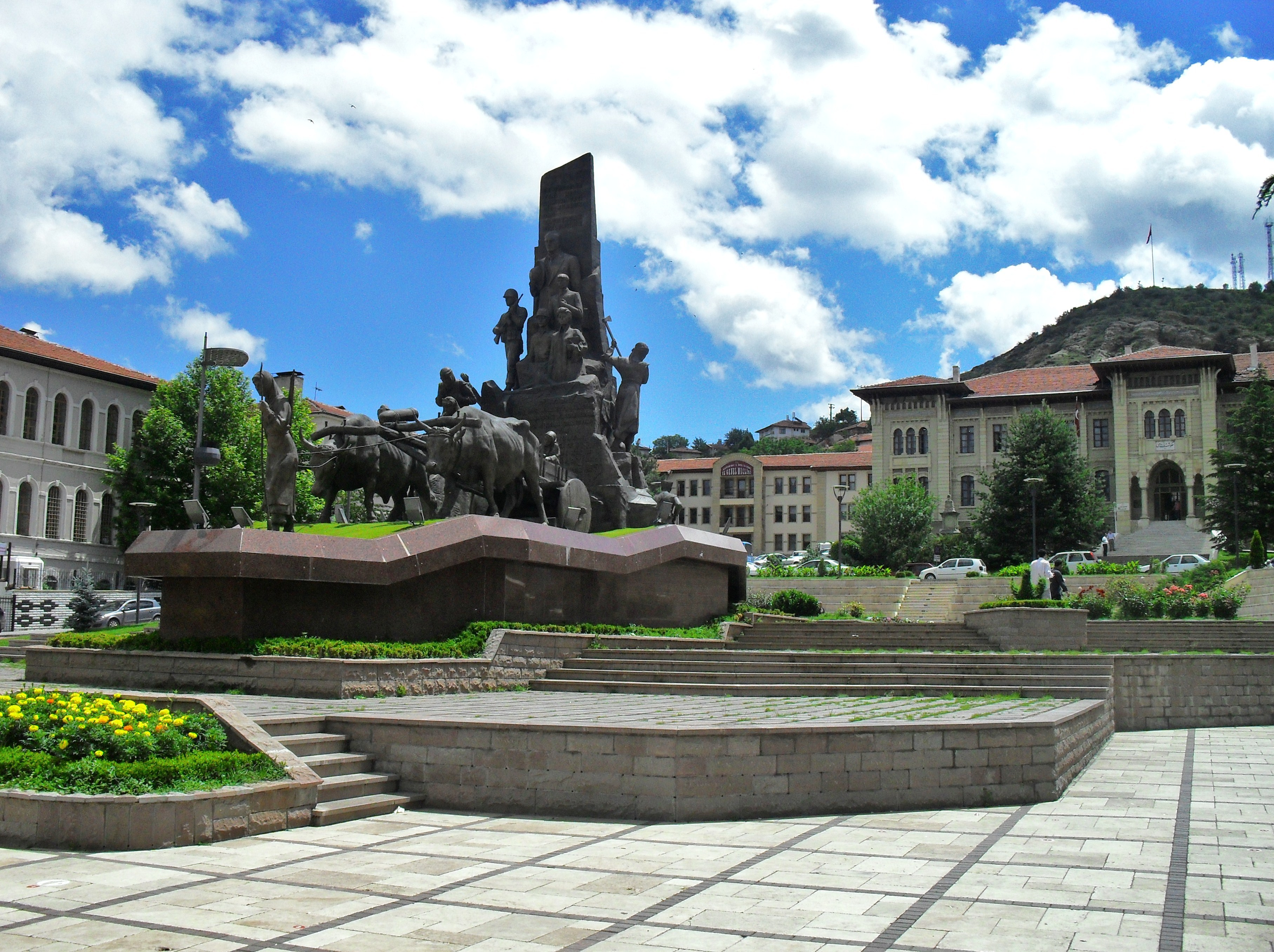
Kastamonu Republic Monument

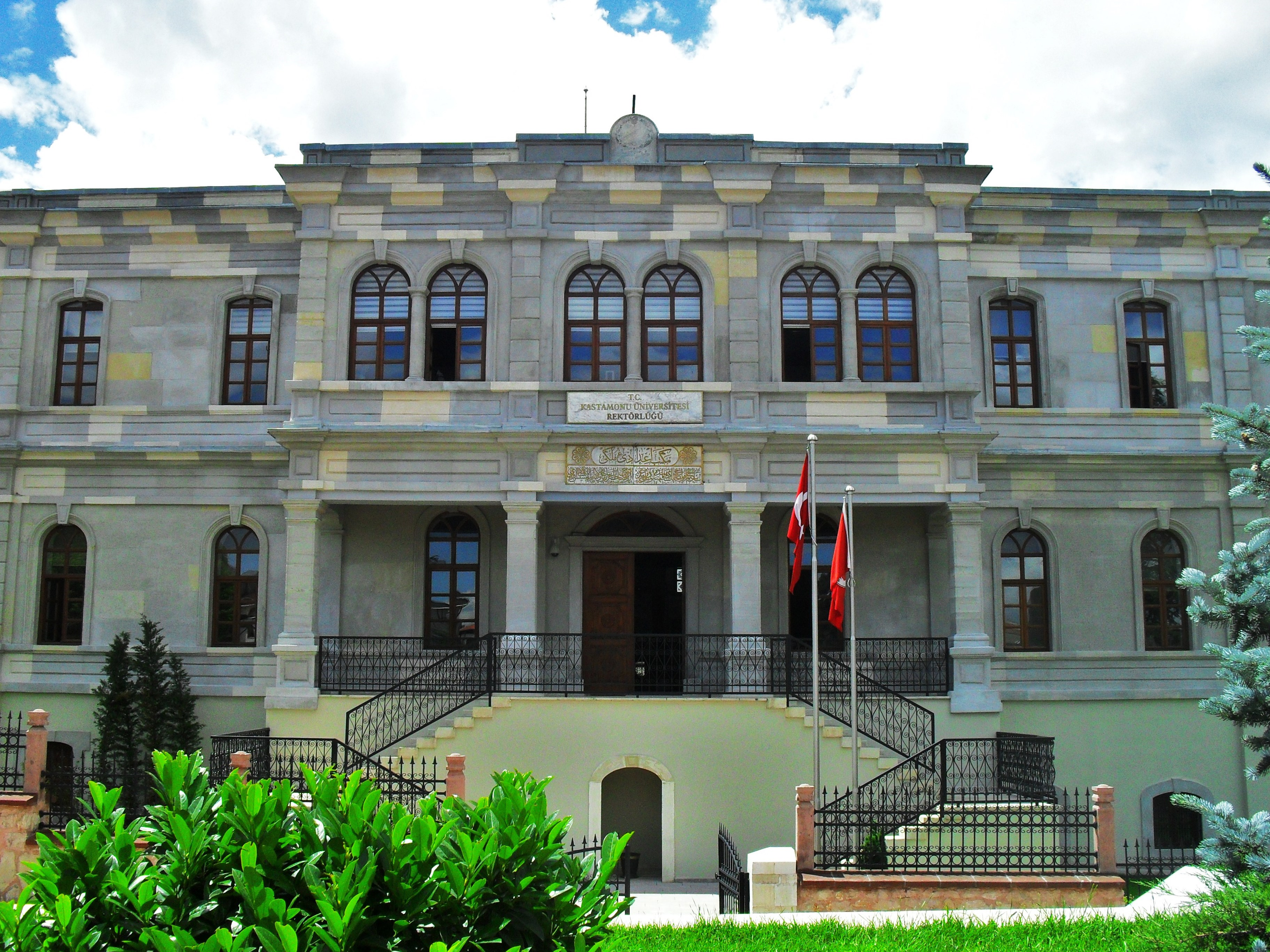
Kastamonu University

There are many ideas about the derivation of the name Kastamonu:

According to the first view, it should be considered that the name Kastamonu is Turkishized from the name Paphlagonía [Greek "land of Paphlagon (people)"]. The region covering the West Black Sea and Central Black Sea regions was called Paphlagonia before the Turks. Today, Kastamonu, Sinop, Bartın, Çankırı and Karabük are located in this region, while parts of Çorum, Bolu, Zonguldak and Samsun provinces remain within the region. The Paphlagonians, who dominated this region in 1000 BC, gave their name to this geography.

According to a second opinion, the city of Kastamonu took its name from the name Kastama, which was used for the same region in the Hittite period. The name Kastama turned into Kastamonu over time.

According to another view, the city of Kastamonu took its name from the combination of the words Gas and Tumanna. Gas, or better known as Kashkas, are among the first settlers of Kastamonu. Tumanna is the name of a city/region located on Kastamonu at that time. The combination of these two words took the form of Kastamonu over time.

According to a third opinion, the city of Kastamonu took its name from the combination of the words Kastra and Komnen. Kastra is derived from the Latin word for "castle" and Komnen refers to the Komnenos Dynasty of emperors, the settlers of this region during the Byzantine period. These two words took the form of Kastamonu over time.

Ibn Battuta visited the city, noting it as "one of the largest and finest cities, where commodities are abundant and prices low." He stayed here forty days.

The famous Sufi saint of the city is Sheikh Shaban Veli (Şaban-ı Veli in Turkish, d. 976 AH/1569 AD).

The Dress Code Revolution under President Mustafa Kemal Pasha (later known as Atatürk) was started on August 23, 1925, at Kastamonu. He made his historical speech concerning the "Hat and Dress Revolution" during his visit to Kastamonu in 1925 in the Republican People's Party building. The building is now used as the Archeological Museum of Kastamonu. The possessions used by Atatürk in his Kastamonu visit are also exhibited in the museum.

== Cuisine ==
Typical country fare in Kastamonu includes a quick rose petal jam made with sugared water, citric acid and gül mayası – the latter is a preparation of culinary-grade rose petals with sugar and citric acid that preserves them and brings out their flavor and fragrance. Homemade hot sauce is made by simmering grated tomato, garlic, Turkish red pepper, hot peppers, sunflower oil, salt and pepper on the stove. Sweet katmer is made by preparing a simple unleavened dough of flour, salt and water that is smeared with a tahini and sunflower oil mixture as it is folded.

Breakfast might include farm made cheese, olives, pekmez, fried potatoes, rose jam homemade hot sauce, eggs served hot in the pan (called sahanda yumurta), folded unleavened bread called katmer, fresh farm milk and black tea.

A speciality of Taşköprü, Kastamonu is freshly slaughtered whole lamb slow-cooked over the glowing embers of wood in a sealed, airtight "well" — this regional specialty is called kuyu kebabı in Turkish. A little water added to a tray ensures that steam keeps the meat moist throughout the cooking process.

Produces around 200 tons of pastırma each year, çemen is made using garlic that is locally produced by the farming villages of Taşköprü.

== Economic history ==
In the early 20th century, nickel was mined in the area around Kastamonu.

== Education ==
Kastamonu is home to Kastamonu University, which was established in 2006 by incorporating existing colleges, schools, and institutes that were previously under Ankara University and Gazi University. Notable high schools in Kastamonu are: Abdurrahman Paşa Lisesi, also known as Kastamonu Lisesi, the first modern high school that was established in Anatolia in late Ottoman Empire. Kastamonu Mustafa Kaya Lisesi, an Anatolian high school, one of the most successful high schools in Turkey outside Istanbul, Ankara and İzmir.

== Geography ==
The city consists of 20 quarters: Kuzeykent, Mehmet Akif Ersoy, Yavuz Selim, Budamış, Akmescit, Aktekke, Atabeygazi, Beyçelebi, Cebrail, Hepkebirler, Hisarardı, Honsalar, Inönü, Isfendiyar, Ismailbey, Kırkçeşme, Saraçlar, Topçuoğlu, Esentepe and Candaroğulları.

=== Climate ===
Kastamonu has a humid continental climate (Köppen: Dfb, Trewartha: Dc) with cold winters and warm summers. Precipitation is evenly distributed throughout the year, with a noticeable increase during spring.

Climate data for Kastamonu (1991–2020, extremes 1930–present)
Month	Jan	Feb	Mar	Apr	May	Jun	Jul	Aug	Sep	Oct	Nov	Dec	Year
Record high °C (°F)	19.2 (66.6)	21.1 (70.0)	28.5 (83.3)	31.4 (88.5)	35.1 (95.2)	37.5 (99.5)	42.2 (108.0)	40.2 (104.4)	39.3 (102.7)	32.5 (90.5)	25.3 (77.5)	21.1 (70.0)	42.2 (108.0)
Mean daily maximum °C (°F)	3.6 (38.5)	6.9 (44.4)	11.5 (52.7)	17.0 (62.6)	21.7 (71.1)	25.3 (77.5)	28.8 (83.8)	29.1 (84.4)	24.6 (76.3)	18.7 (65.7)	11.2 (52.2)	4.8 (40.6)	16.9 (62.4)
Daily mean °C (°F)	−0.6 (30.9)	1.1 (34.0)	4.8 (40.6)	9.5 (49.1)	14.2 (57.6)	17.7 (63.9)	20.5 (68.9)	20.5 (68.9)	16.2 (61.2)	11.2 (52.2)	4.9 (40.8)	0.7 (33.3)	10.1 (50.2)
Mean daily minimum °C (°F)	−3.8 (25.2)	−3.1 (26.4)	−0.4 (31.3)	3.4 (38.1)	7.7 (45.9)	11.0 (51.8)	13.0 (55.4)	13.1 (55.6)	9.5 (49.1)	5.9 (42.6)	0.5 (32.9)	−2.4 (27.7)	4.5 (40.1)
Record low °C (°F)	−26.9 (−16.4)	−22.3 (−8.1)	−19.7 (−3.5)	−8.5 (16.7)	−3.6 (25.5)	0.2 (32.4)	0.0 (32.0)	0.9 (33.6)	−1.5 (29.3)	−7.5 (18.5)	−19.3 (−2.7)	−23.7 (−10.7)	−26.9 (−16.4)
Average precipitation mm (inches)	29.4 (1.16)	28.1 (1.11)	38.5 (1.52)	50.5 (1.99)	77.9 (3.07)	89.6 (3.53)	36.0 (1.42)	38.2 (1.50)	38.7 (1.52)	34.8 (1.37)	27.5 (1.08)	36.1 (1.42)	525.3 (20.68)
Average precipitation days	12.23	10.77	12.37	12.8	14.4	12.6	6.73	6.1	7.17	9.37	9.07	12.07	125.68
Average relative humidity (%)	79.0	73.3	69.1	66.3	68.0	67.5	61.9	61.8	66.7	73.8	78.0	82.1	70.6
Mean monthly sunshine hours	60.5	94.5	125.0	160.5	198.3	220.7	273.3	265.2	192.9	143.7	103.5	51.8	1,881.1
Mean daily sunshine hours	2.0	3.4	4.1	5.4	6.4	7.4	8.8	8.6	6.4	4.8	3.5	1.8	5.2
Source 1: Turkish State Meteorological Service
Source 2: NOAA (humidity, sun 1991-2020)

=== Transport ===
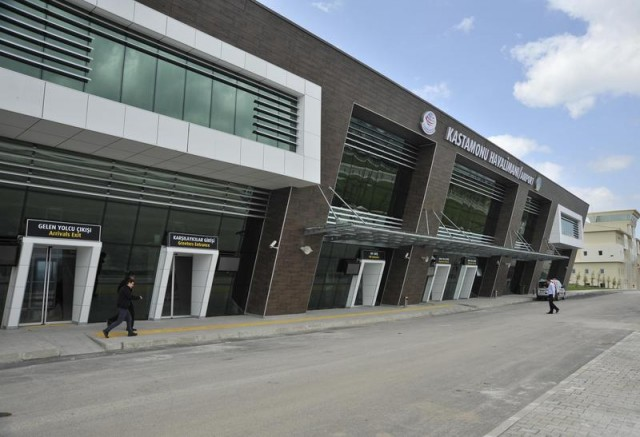
Kastamonu Airport

The main bus station has bus links to most major Turkish cities. Kastamonu Airport is active. Kastamonu is also the main railroad endpoint for the West Black Sea region.

== Notable natives ==
- Latifî (1491–1582), Ottoman poet
- Iovan Tsaous (Yiannis Eitziridis) (1893–1942), Greek musician and composer
- Oğuz Atay (1934–1977), novelist
- Rıfat Ilgaz (1911–1993), novelist
- Halit Akmansü (1883–1953), military officer in the Ottoman and Turkish armies

== Gallery ==
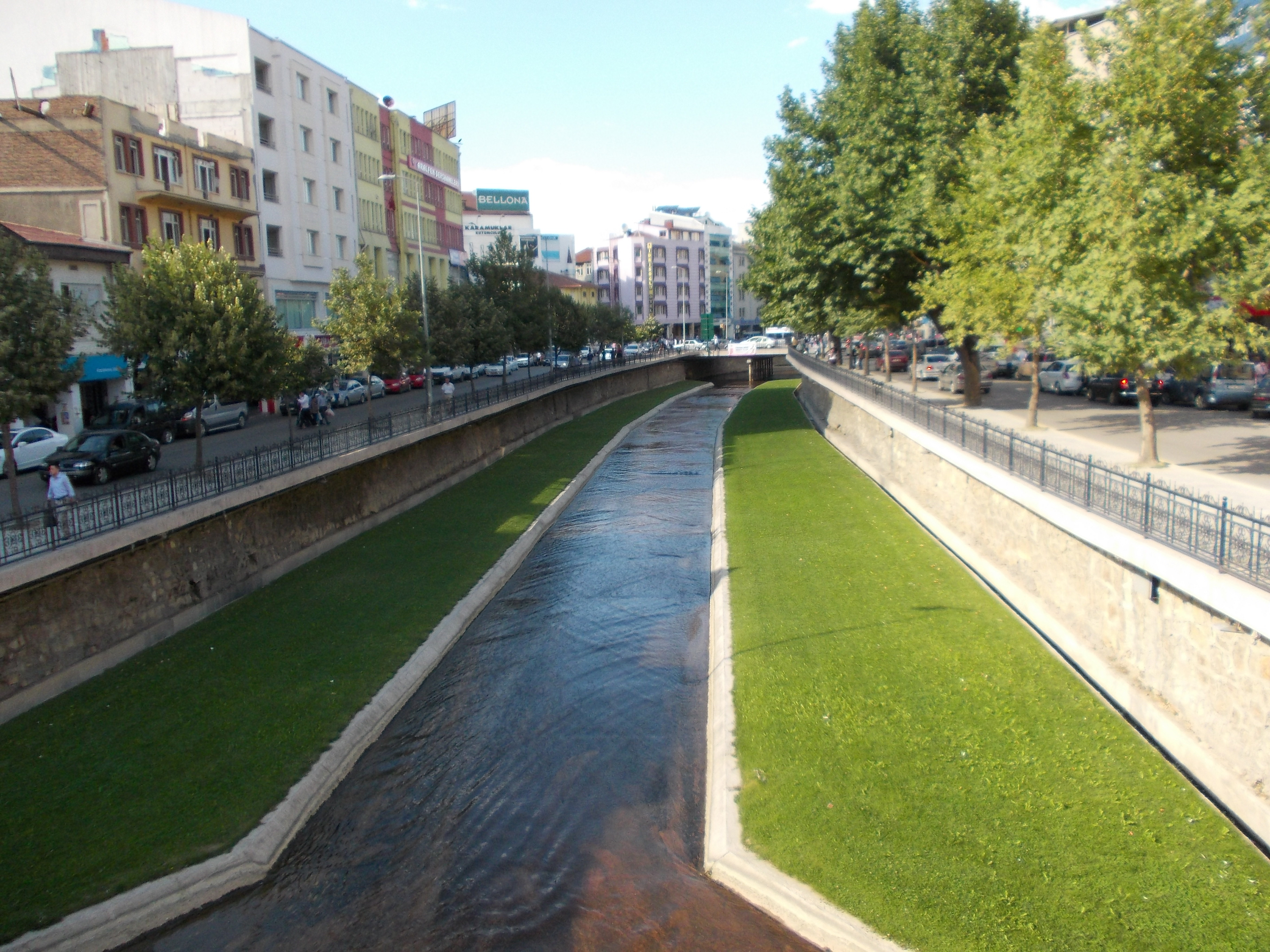
City center

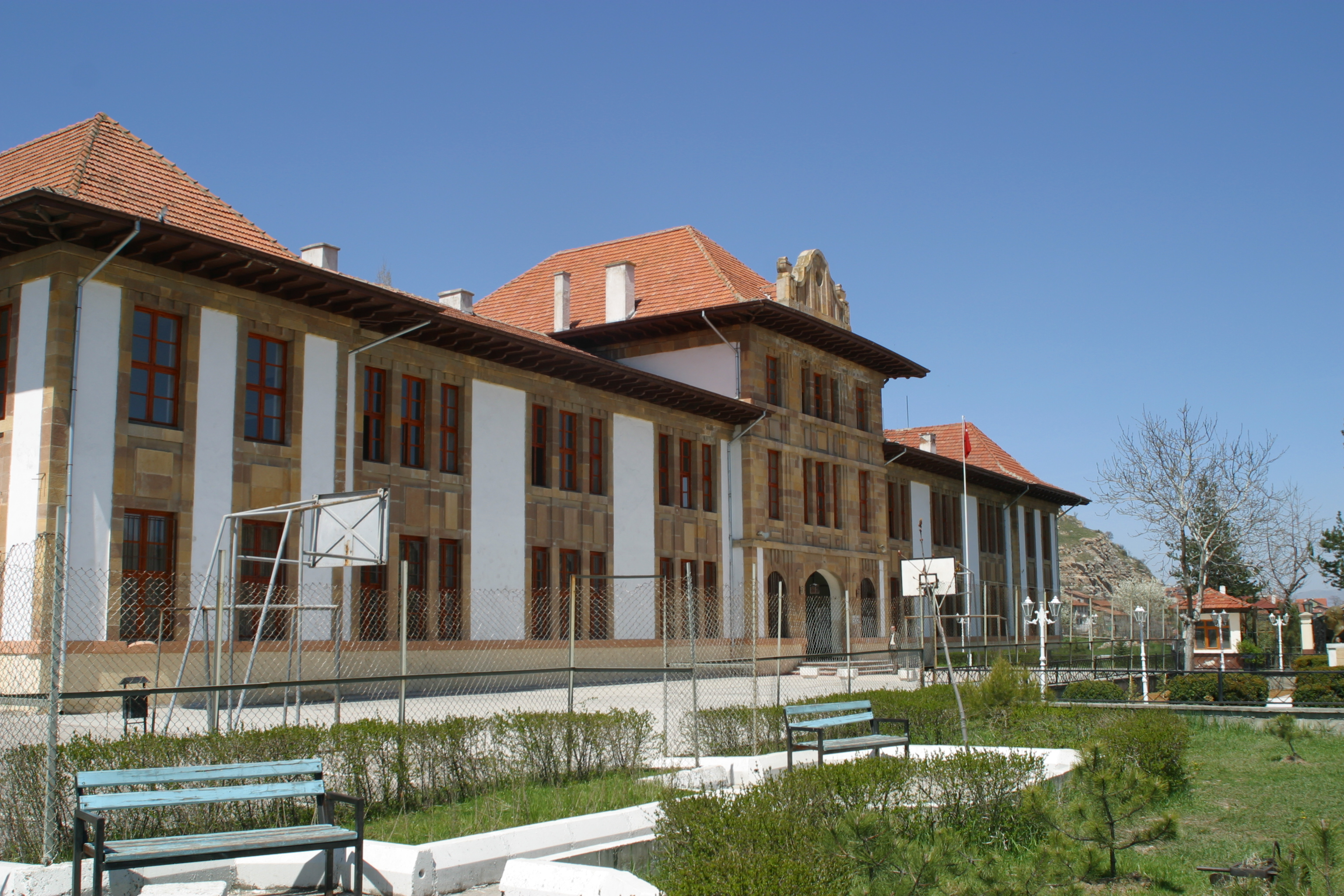
Kastamonu school building

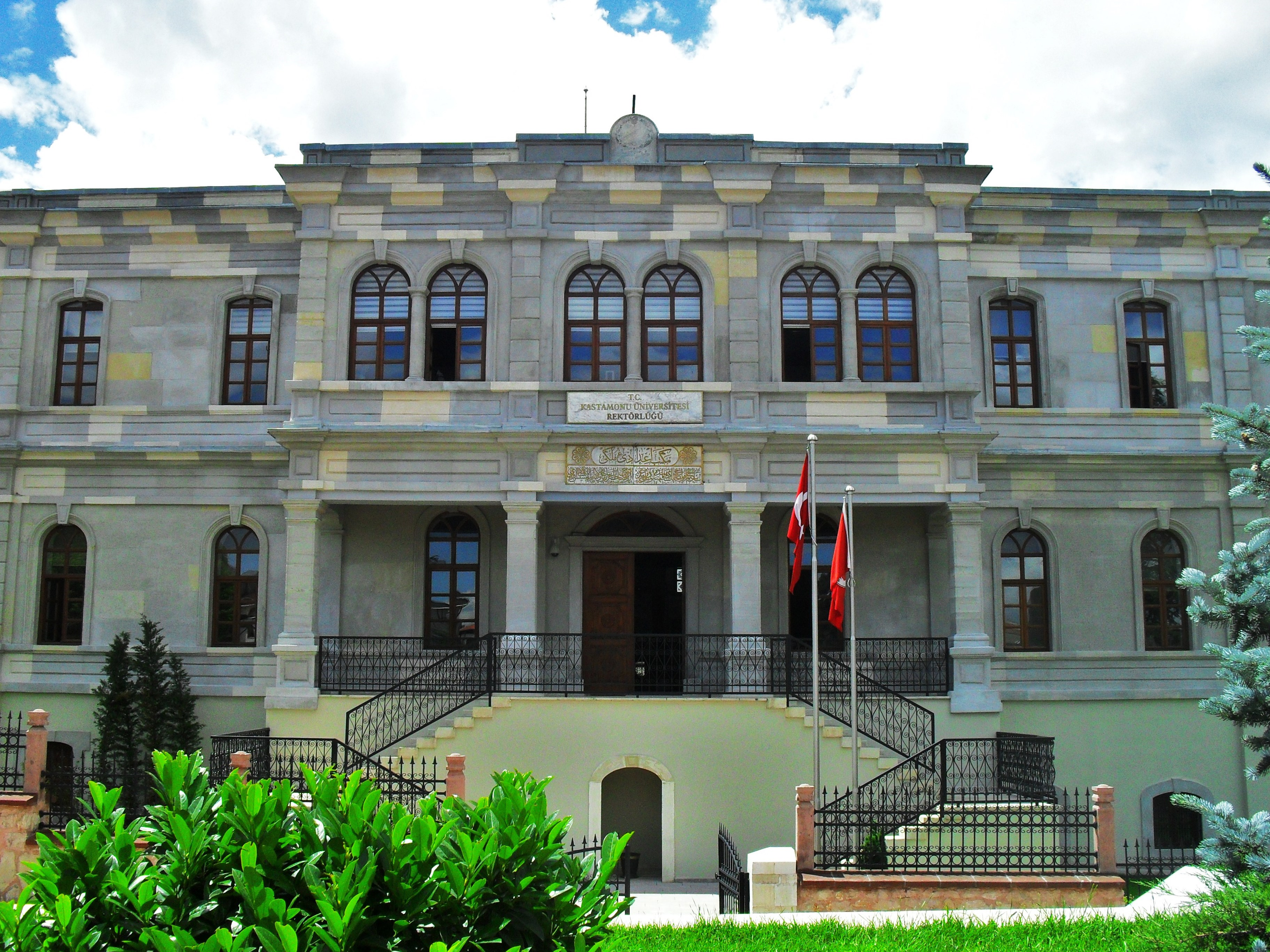
Kastamonu University

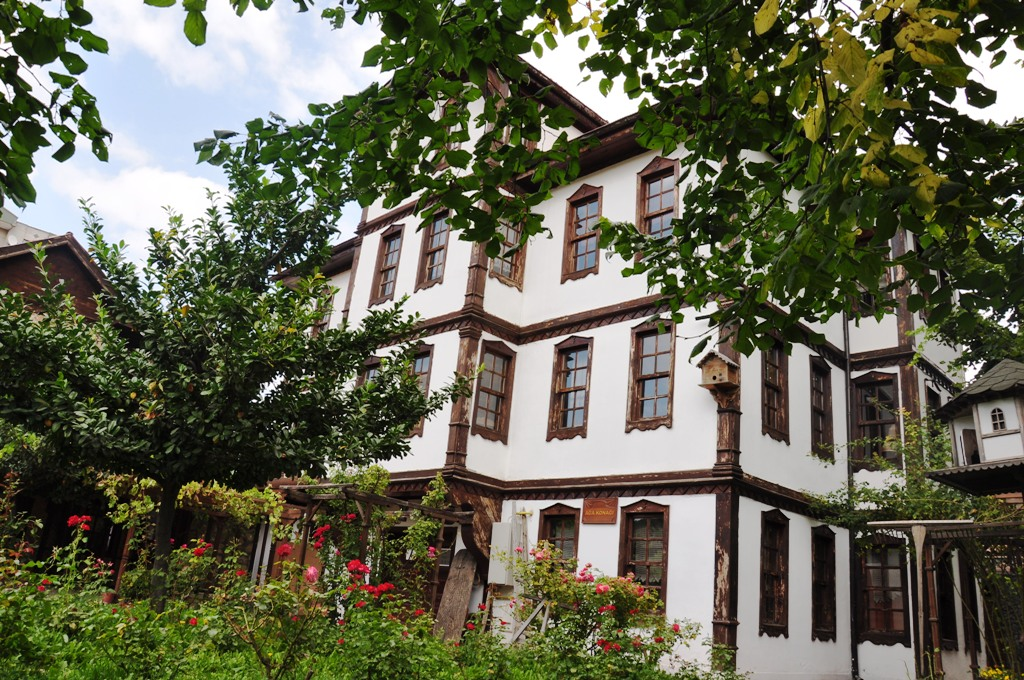
Historic Turkish houses

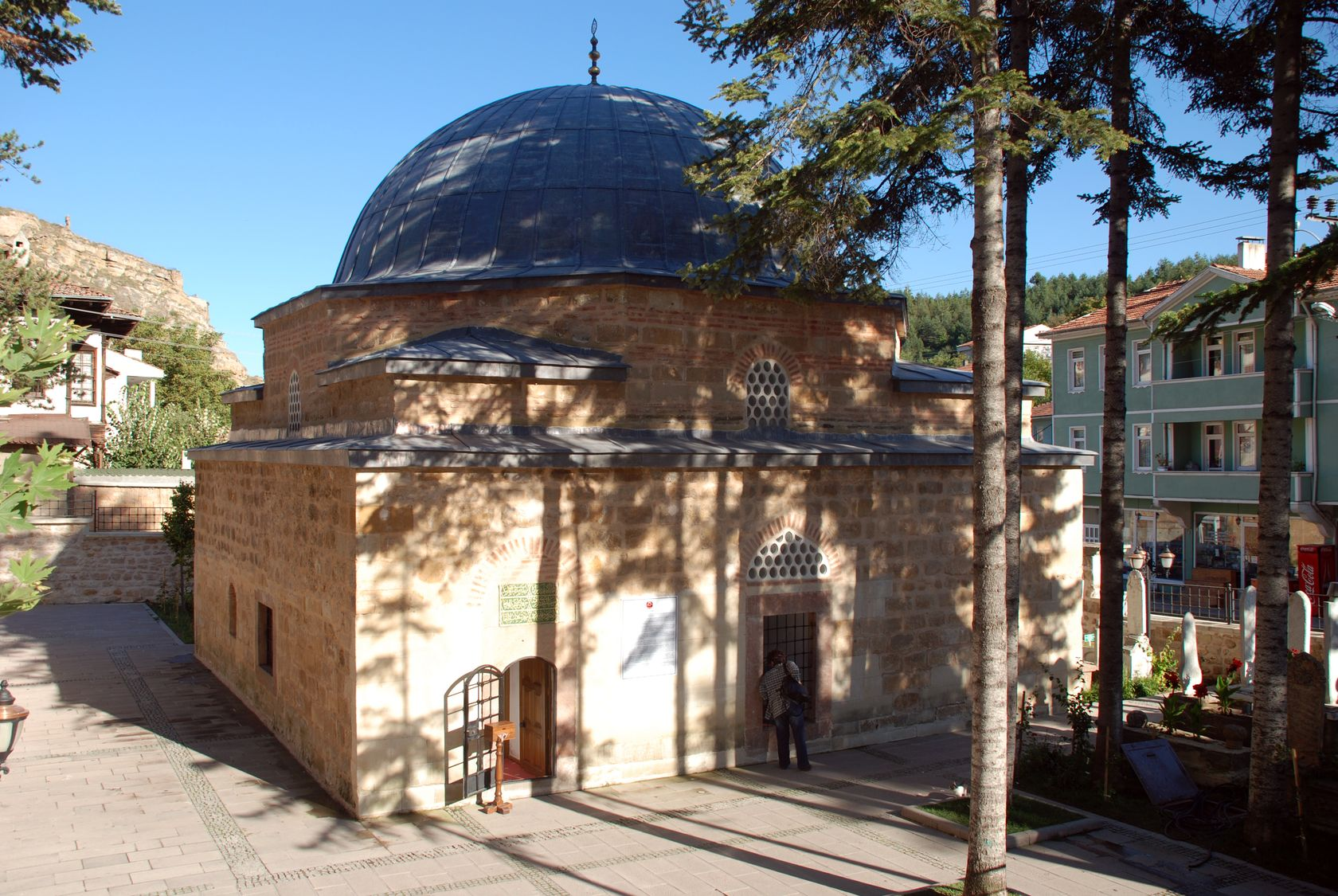
A türbe (tomb)

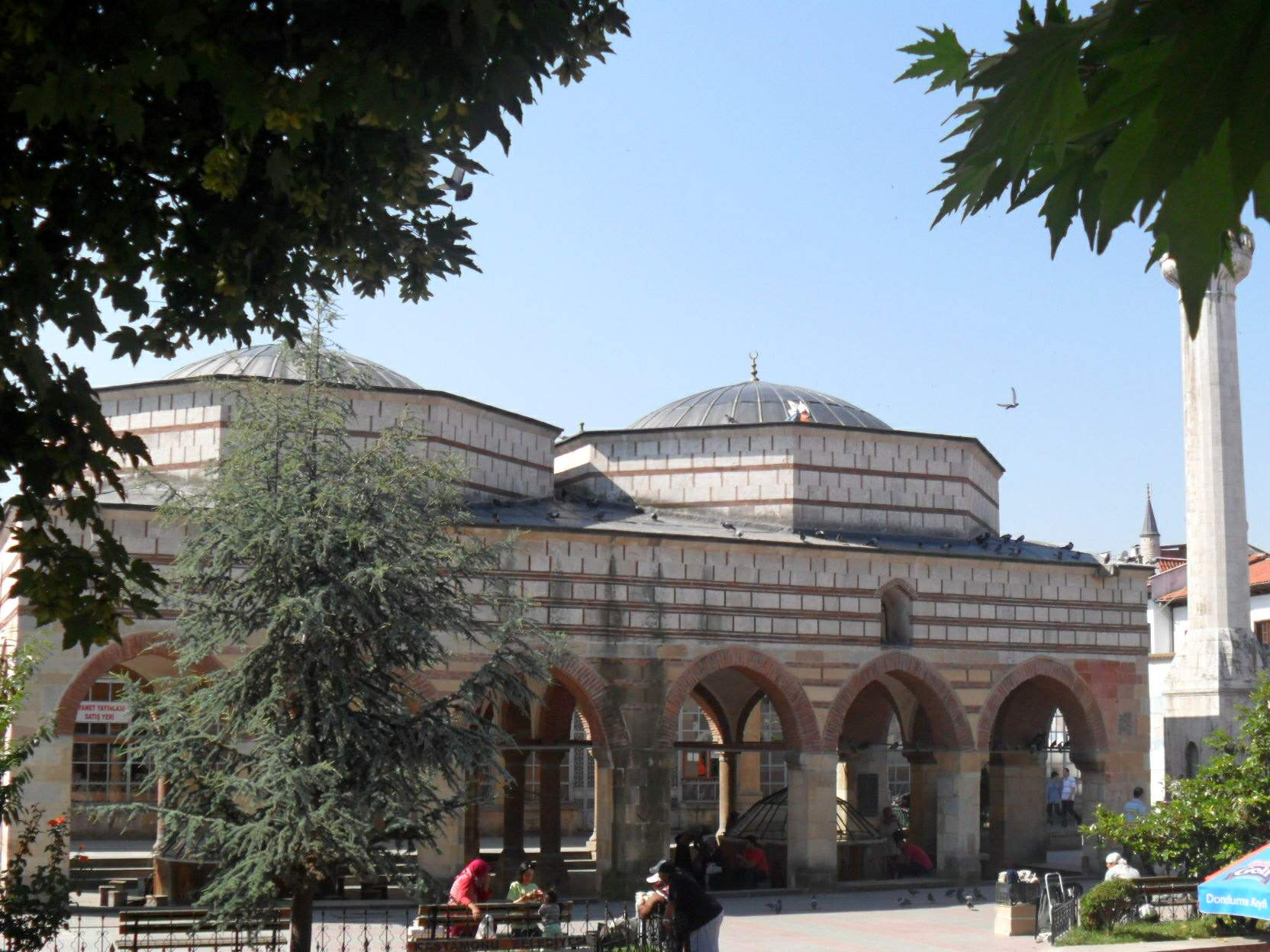
Nasrullah Mosque

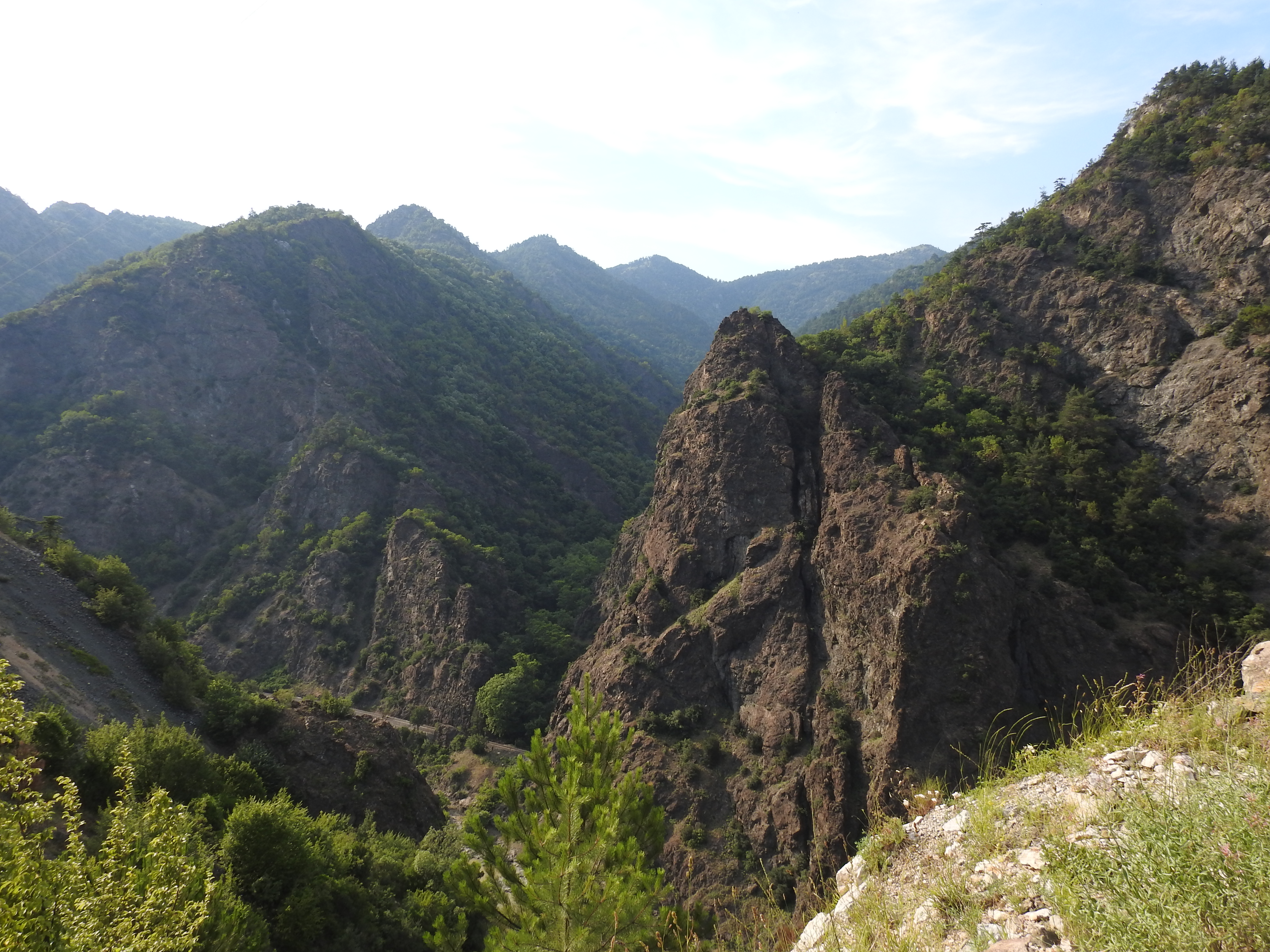
Küre Mountains National Park

== Twin towns – sister cities ==
Kastamonu is twinned with:

- Naryn, Kyrgyzstan
- Bağcılar, Turkey
- Güroymak-Bitlis, Turkey
- Alsancak, Northern Cyprus, Northern Cyprus
- Naryn, Kyrgyzstan

== See also ==
- List of clock towers – Kastamonu has its own Ottoman clock tower (1885)
- Paphlagonia
