= List of states in late medieval Anatolia =

Anatolia is a large peninsula in West Asia and forms one of the two passages between Asia and Europe. All through history, many states both completely independent and vassal, were founded. Below is the list of states (including principalities) in Anatolia during the late Middle Ages (11th–15th centuries).

Name of the state	Duration of rule	Notes
Ahis	1290-1362	Religious fraternity
Aq Qoyunlu (White sheep Turkmens)	1378-1508	
Armenian Kingdom of Cilicia	1198-1375	Issued from Byzantine Empire
Artuqids	1102-1233	
Alaiye	1293-1471	Vassal of Karaman
Aydinids	1300-1425	
Jandarids (later: Isfendiyarids)	1292-1461	
Tzachas	1081-1098	
Chobanids	1211-1309	
Beylik of Çubukoğulları	1085-1112	Vassal of Great Seljuk Empire
Beylik of Demleç	1085-1410	
Dulkadirids	1348-1515	
Eretnids	1335-1390	Issued from Ilkhanids
Beylik of Erzincan	1378-1410	Issued from Eretnids
Eshrefids	1285-1326	
Germiyanids	1300-1429	
Hamidids	1300-1391	
Beylik of İnal	1095-1183	Mostly vassal of its neighbours
Beylik of Kadi Burhan al-Din	1381-1398	Continuation of Eretnids
Karamanids	1277-1487	
Karasids	1296-1357	
Beylik of Lâdik	1262-1391	
Menteshe	1261-1424	
Beylik of Pervane	1277-1322	
Ramadanids	1352-1522	Mostly vassal of Memluks
Beylik of Sahip Ata	1275-1341	
Sarukhanids	1300-1410	
Ahlatshahs	1100-1207	
Beylik of Tanrıbermiş	1074-1098	
Beylik of Teke	1321-1423	Issued from Hamidids
Beyliks of Canik " Beylik of Tacettin" " Beylik of Hacıemir"	1348-1428; 1330s-1427	Actually 6 beyliks
Byzantine Empire	0395-1453	During 1204-1261 Empire of Nicea
County of Edessa	1098-1149	Crusader state
Danishmends	1071-1178	
Emirate of Armenia	0654-0884	Vassal of Arabic Empire
Empire of Nicaea	1204-1261	Byzantine Empire after the loss of capital
Empire of Trebizond	1204-1461	Issued from Byzantine Empire
Karakoyunlu Turkmens (Black sheep Turkmens)	1375-1468	
Latin Empire	1204-1261	Crusader state
Mengujekids	1072-1277	
Ottoman Empire	1299-1922	Called beylik in the early years
Principality of Antioch	1098-1268	Crusader state
Principality of Roussel de Bailleul	1073-1075	Principality in the former Armeniakon theme
Saltukids	1072-1202	
Sultanate of Rum	1077-1307	Issued from the Great Seljuk Empire

== See also ==
- Ancient kingdoms of Anatolia
- Anatolian beyliks
- History of Anatolia
