= Great Mosque of Diyarbakır =

Mosque in Sur, Diyarbakır, Turkey

Diyarbakır Grand Mosque
- Turkish: Cami-i Kebîr
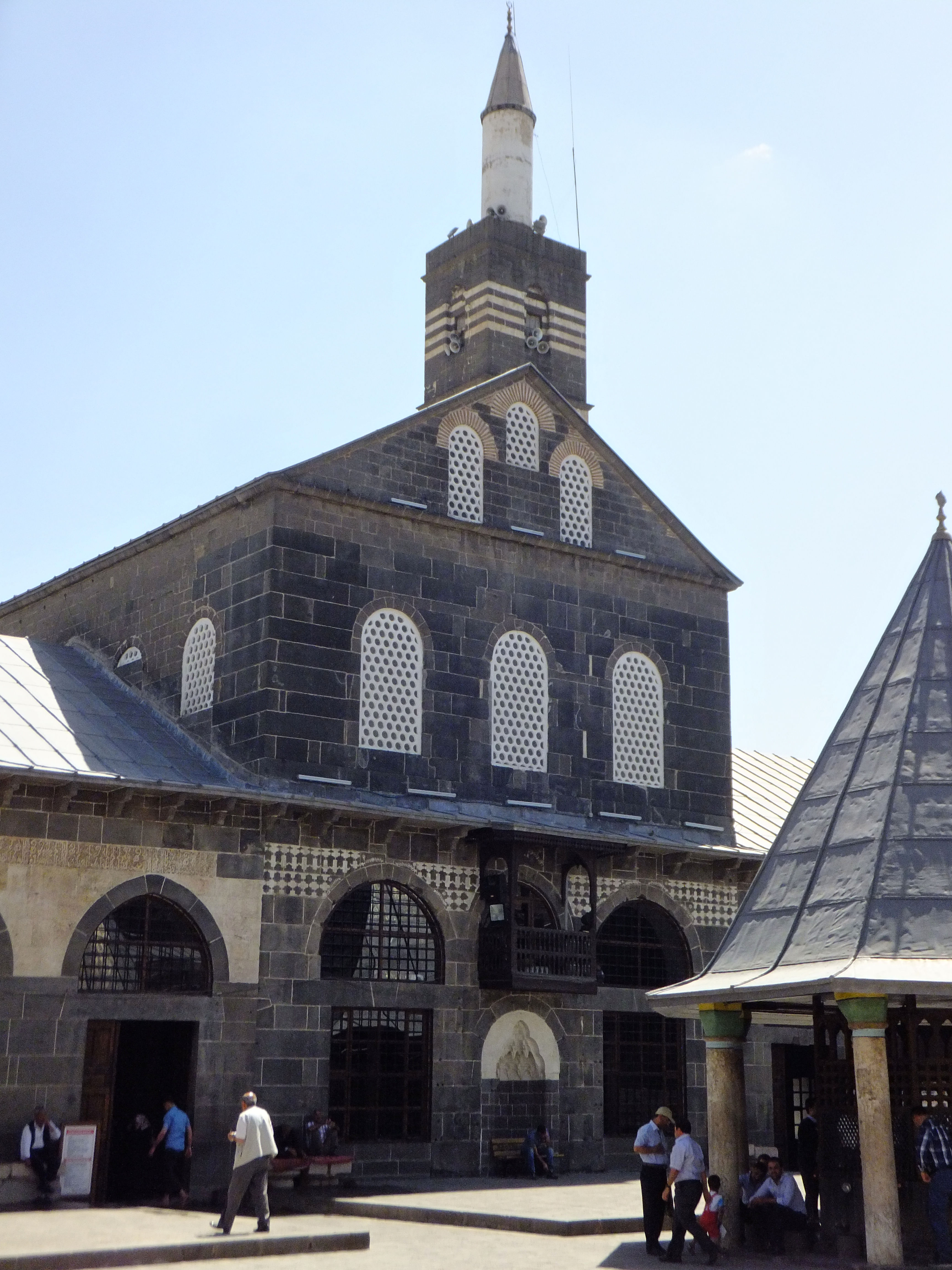

- Location of the mosque in Turkey.

Religion
- Affiliation: Sunni Islam

Location
- Location: Sur, Diyarbakır, Turkey
- Coordinates: 37°54′44″N 40°14′9″E

Architecture
- Type: Mosque
- Style: Islamic, Seljuk
- Groundbreaking: c. 1091

The Great Mosque of Diyarbakır (Turkish: Diyarbakır Ulu Camii or Cami-i Kebîr; Kurdish: Mizgefta Mezin a Amedê) was built in the late 11th century by the Seljuk sultan Malik-Shah I over an older mosque. According to some, it is the fifth holiest site in Islam after the Great Mosque of Damascus, which influenced its design. It can accommodate up to 5,000 worshippers and host four different Islamic traditions.

== History ==
=== Origins ===
The Great Mosque of Diyarbakir is the oldest mosque in Anatolia and possibly the oldest in Turkey. Its origins and development are complicated and still not fully understood today. A mosque was founded in this area in the 7th century after the Muslim conquest of the city in 639. Recent archeological studies have suggested that the present mosque stands over a part of what was previously the Roman forum of the city. According to traditional narratives, it also stands on the site of an earlier church built by the Byzantine emperor Heraclius in the 620s and dedicated to Saint Thomas.

A German translation of a medieval Muslim text written by Pseudo-Waqidi (so-called because it may not be al-Waqidi himself, but rather a later author), claims that when the city was conquered, its main church was partitioned to be shared between Muslims and Christians. Stories of Christian churches being partitioned in this manner are a recurring motif in Muslim narratives about the early Islamic conquests. In the case of Diyarbakir, this story has been accepted by some scholars (e.g. Creswell) and is widely repeated by locals and in popular narratives of the mosque's history.

The historicity of this story and the credibility of its text source have been questioned by some scholars due to uncertainty about the source's author, inconsistencies between its German and Arabic translations, and contradictions from other sources. Fatma Meral Halifeoğlu, Martine Assénat, and Jean-Charles Ducène have discounted the story as apocryphal. One of the contradictions from other sources is the account of medieval Muslim author Yaqut (12th–13th century), which appears to contradict Pseudo-Waqidi in stating that the first Muslim conquerors allowed the Christians of the city to keep all their churches but prevented them from building new ones. Among the other complications is the Zuqnin Chronicle, which records that the city's main church, built by Heraclius in 629, was fully restored by the Christian community in 770, long after the Muslim conquest. Another author, Theodotus (d. 698), mentions that the Muslims built a mosque after the conquest of the city. Nasir Khusraw wrote in 1045 that the city's main church was an impressive building that stood next to the mosque. These sources indicate that the church was still used by the Christian community during this time and do not mention it being shared with Muslims. One interpretation, supported by these sources, is that the original mosque was located next to the church and shared a platform with it, rather than sharing the same building, at least until the 11th century.

=== Construction of the present mosque ===
The current building dates from a Great Seljuk construction in the late 11th century and subsequent work during the 12th century. The Seljuks conquered the city in 1085. Works on the mosque are recorded by a series of inscriptions, most of which remain in situ but some of which have been moved over the years. The oldest inscription in the mosque is found on the western façade of the prayer hall; it names the Seljuk sultan Malik Shah, who commissioned the construction, and provides the date of construction as 1091–1092 CE (484 AH). The Seljuk mosque's layout is similar to and heavily influenced by that of the Great Mosque of Damascus, built in the early 8th century during the Umayyad period. This influence might be explained by the fact that Malik Shah also carried out restoration work on the Great Mosque of Damascus in 1082–1083, nine years prior to his work on the Great Mosque of Diyarbakir. Malik Shah rebuilt the Great Mosque of Diyarbakir as a means of bringing the prestige and glory from Damascus, the capital of Syria, to Diyarbakir in the south of Anatolia.

In 1115 (Note: In some sources, the year 1155 is cited instead.) the mosque was severely damaged by a fire caused by lightning. A second inscription on the façade of the prayer hall notes work that was done in 1155–1156. The mosque's minaret has an inscription with the date 1141, though it seems to refer to work being done on the western and eastern wings of the mosque.

The western and eastern wings of the mosque, which flank the main courtyard, are products of Inalid and Nisanid patronage in the 12th century. Both the Inalids and Nisanids were local dynasties under Seljuk suzerainty. These sections of the complex are also known as the East and West Maqsuras. The courtyard façade of the western wing contains two inscriptions: an inscription on the lower level bears the date 1117–1118, while one on the upper level contains the date 1124–1125 and names the son and grandson of Malik Shah. The eastern wing of the mosque, which also contains the main external entrance leading to the courtyard, bears an inscription dating it to 1163-1164, during the Nisanid period. The 1155–1156 inscription on the prayer hall façade also makes reference to this eastern section. The mosque's entrance portal was probably built in its current form between 1155 and 1178.

The elaborately decorated western and eastern courtyard façades are both notable for the use of spolia from older Byzantine buildings, including columns, Corinthian capitals, friezes with vine motifs, and pieces of Greek inscriptions. They appear to have been used deliberately to create a new and consistent decorative program for the courtyard. They were created under the supervision of Hibatallah of Gurgan, the only recorded architect of the mosque, who also completed the prayer hall in 1155-1156.

=== Later additions and restorations ===
During the Artuqid period, two madrasas were built and added to the mosque complex. The Zinciriye Medrese, dated to 1198, is located nearby as a separate unit. The Mesudiye Medrese, which occupies part of the north side of the courtyard, was built between 1193–1194 and 1223. (Note: Some sources give the foundation date as 1198 instead of 1193–1194.) The courtyard façade of this madrasa is preceded by a portico incorporating spolia of thick antique columns. This was most likely added at the same time as the madrasa, around or before 1223.

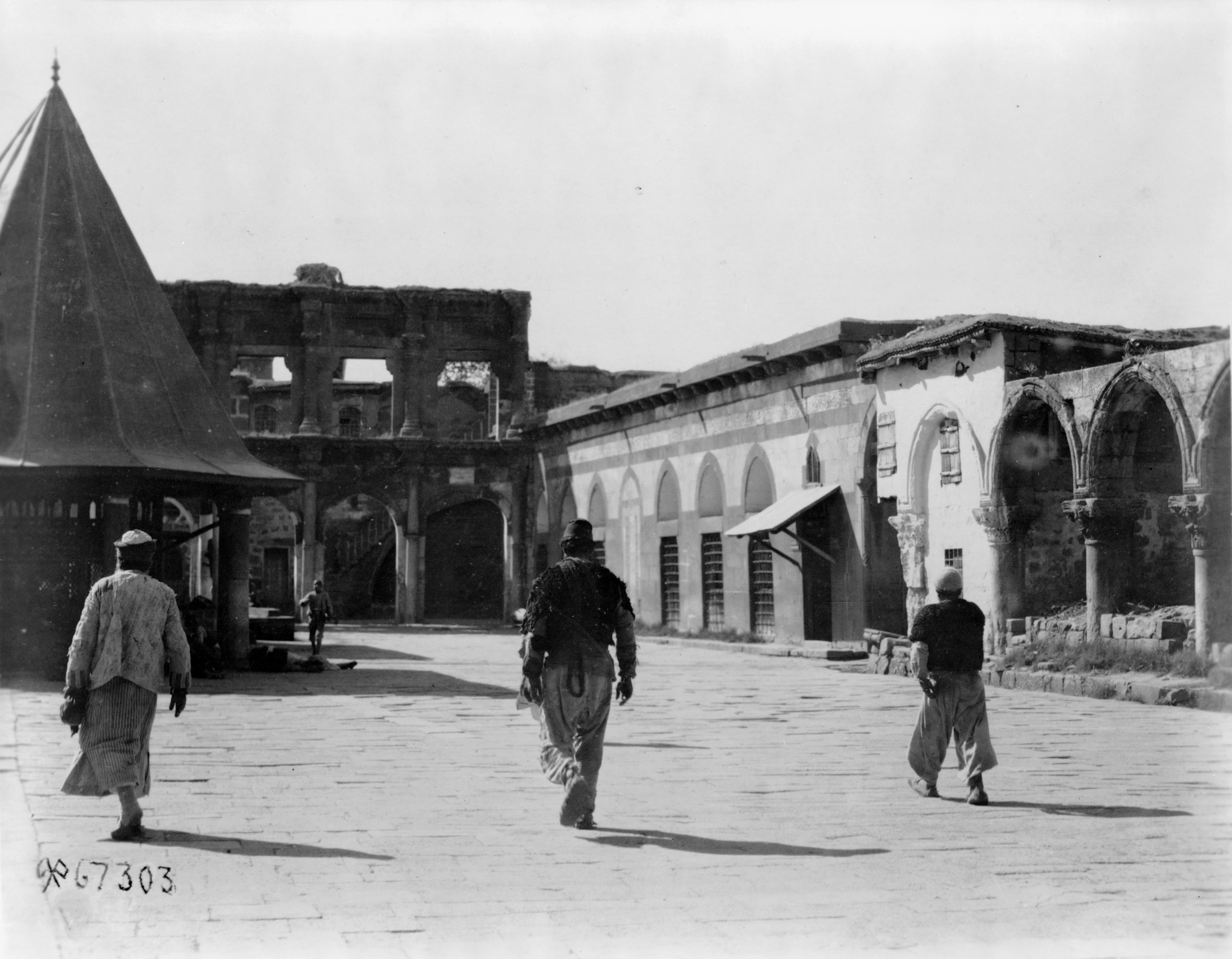
Courtyard of the mosque in a 1919 photo

After the Ottoman conquest of the city in 1515, a second, smaller prayer hall, known as the Şafi kısmı (the "Shafi'i part") was built next to the mosque's entrance, on the courtyard's north side, to serve the Shafi'i legal school. It is dated by an inscription to 1528–1529. The central nave of the prayer hall, much of the hall's interior, and the pitched roof covering it were probably all redone in Ottoman times. Later renovations include additions from the 18th century under the Ottomans, such as the stone used in the mihrab set in the middle of the qibla wall. The current minaret was rebuilt in 1839. The shadirvan (fountain) in the center of the courtyard was added in 1849.

== Architecture ==
=== Courtyard ===
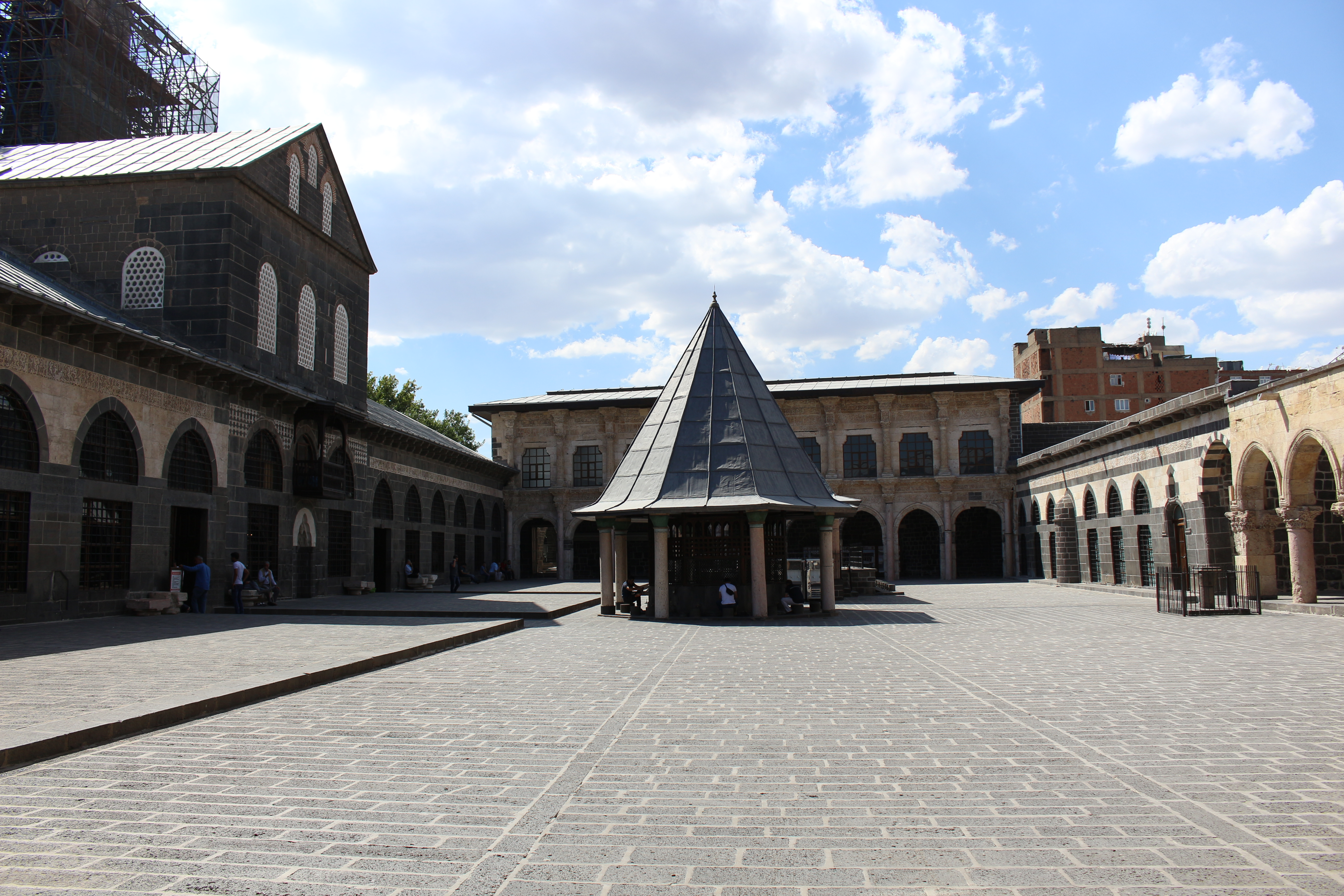
Courtyard of the mosque, which has undergone many renovations (2016 photo)

The courtyard of the mosque is bound on both the east and west sides by porticoes. Its floor is paved with basalt blocks, with the mosque located on the south side of the courtyard. The main entrance of the mosque can be found through a portal on its eastern side. The mosque's eastern and western porticoes each has two stories. Both porticoes own intricate and beautiful stone carvings. The north façade is shorter compared to the other two facades and contains only one story. The south façade, on the other hand, is divided into three unique sections. Two sections are lateral arms, each being only one story high. The two arms are then split in the center by a section that rises more than twice the height of the arms.

Kufic inscriptions found on the building's exteriors record in detail the rebuilding and additions made to the complex throughout its long history. Lavish carving and decoration of the columns in the courtyard are one of the distinguishing features of the Great Mosque. The western arcade of the courtyard includes the first use of the broken arch.

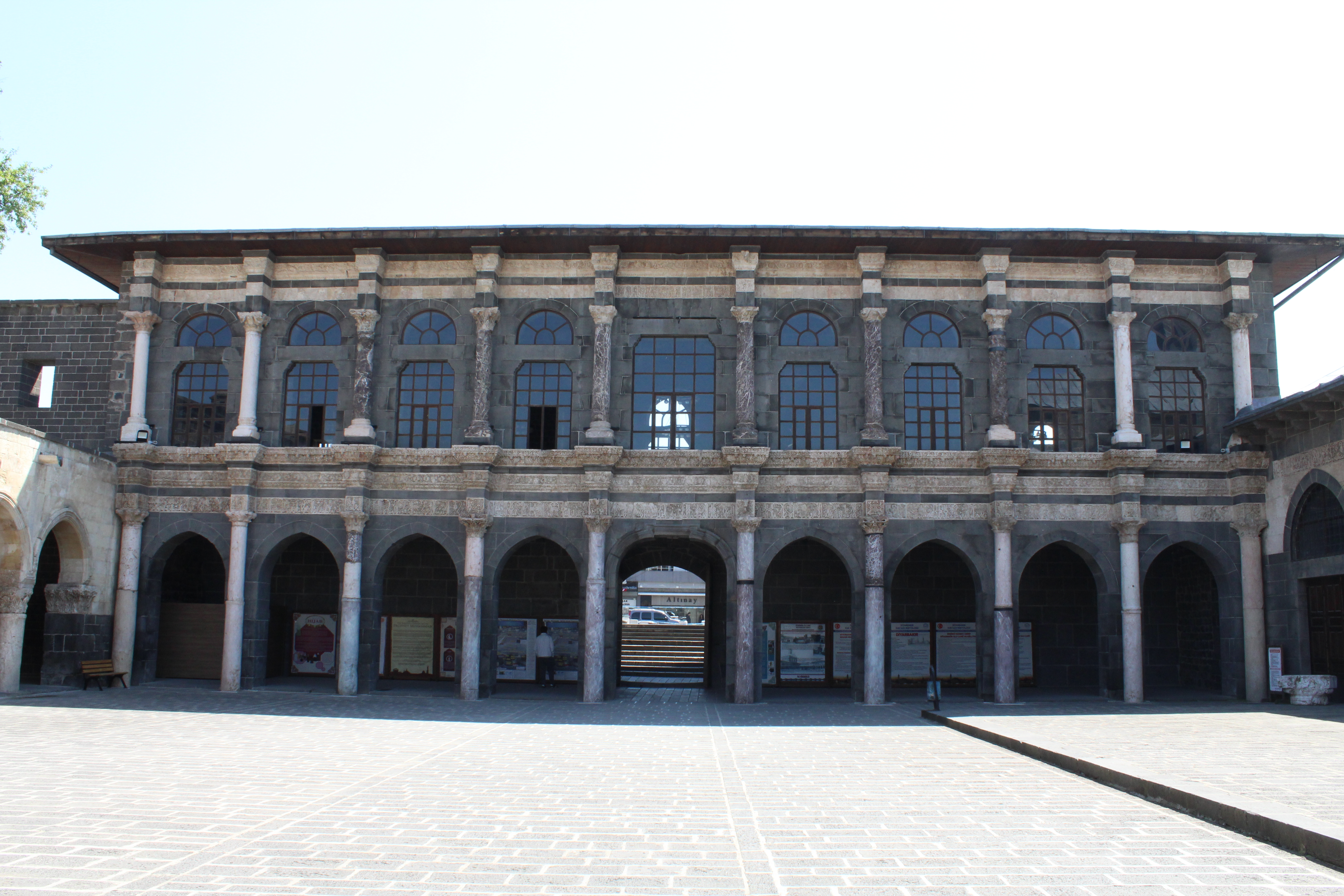
Eastern façade of the courtyard, with columns and carved decoration (2020 photo)

The columns of the courtyard's facades made from four rock types; pre-Tertiary met ophiolite, Eocene limestones, Miocene limestones, and Poli-Quaternary basalts. While the mosque underwent numerous reconstructions and suffered much damage since its establishment, the original columns were reused during the reconstruction periods of the Great Mosque. This was proven by the lengths of the columns existing in segmented forms, the varied column lengths, and the use of different materials the columns are made of. The columns were originally thought to be structural, but later considered to be in place for either partial support or simply for decoration.

The East Maqsura is a two story structure located on the eastern portion of the courtyard, and is covered with timber and a tile covered roof. Attached to the courtyard's northern side is the Mesudiye Madrasa.

=== Prayer hall ===
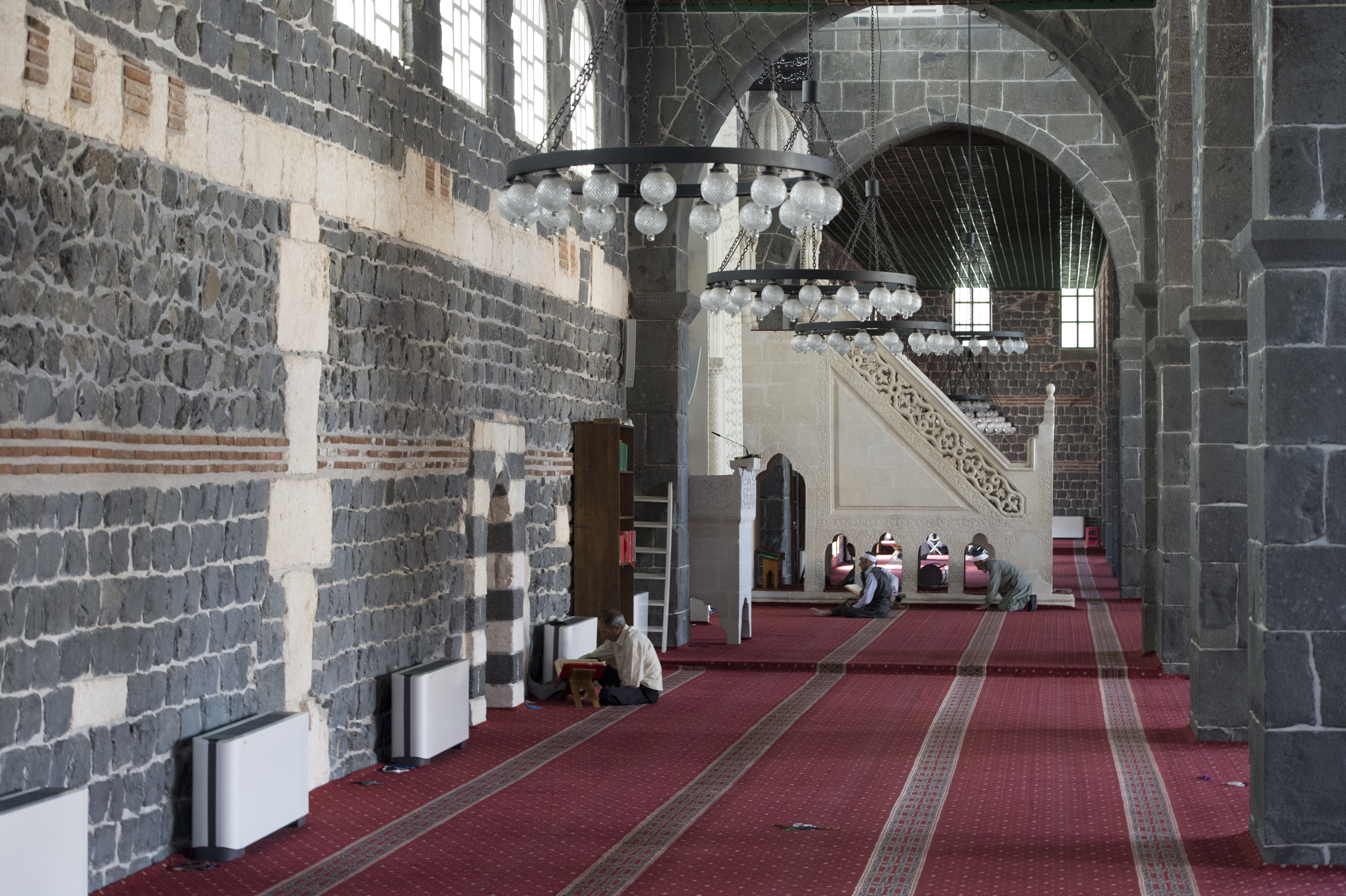
Interior of the prayer hall (Photo from 2014, after recent restoration)

The prayer hall is a wide interior space with three aisles running parallel to the qibla wall (the southern wall, which stands in the direction of prayer). The aisles are divided in the middle by a large central nave which runs perpendicular to the qibla wall. At the southern end of this nave, in the middle of the qibla wall, is the main mihrab. The nave's ceiling features painted decoration. On the outside, the prayer hall is topped by a pitched roof covered with lead plating. The roof of the central nave rises above the rest of the roof on either side. The prayer hall's courtyard façade has two wings on either side which are each pierced with two doors and five windows, while in the middle is a much taller façade corresponding to the central nave inside. The courtyard façade is decorated with garland and meander motifs, as well as an inscription with floral Kufic calligraphy.

== Significance ==
The mosque, located in the center of the old city, is the largest and most important historic mosque in the Diyarbakir. It can accommodate up to 5,000 worshippers and is known for hosting four different Islamic traditions. According to some, it is the fifth holiest site in Islam. The mosque is also the oldest in Anatolia. The attached Mesudiye Medrese, founded in the 1190s, could be the oldest surviving madrasa to teach all four legal schools of Sunni Islam (the other oldest being the Mustansiriya in Baghdad).

== Comparison with the Great Mosque of Damascus ==
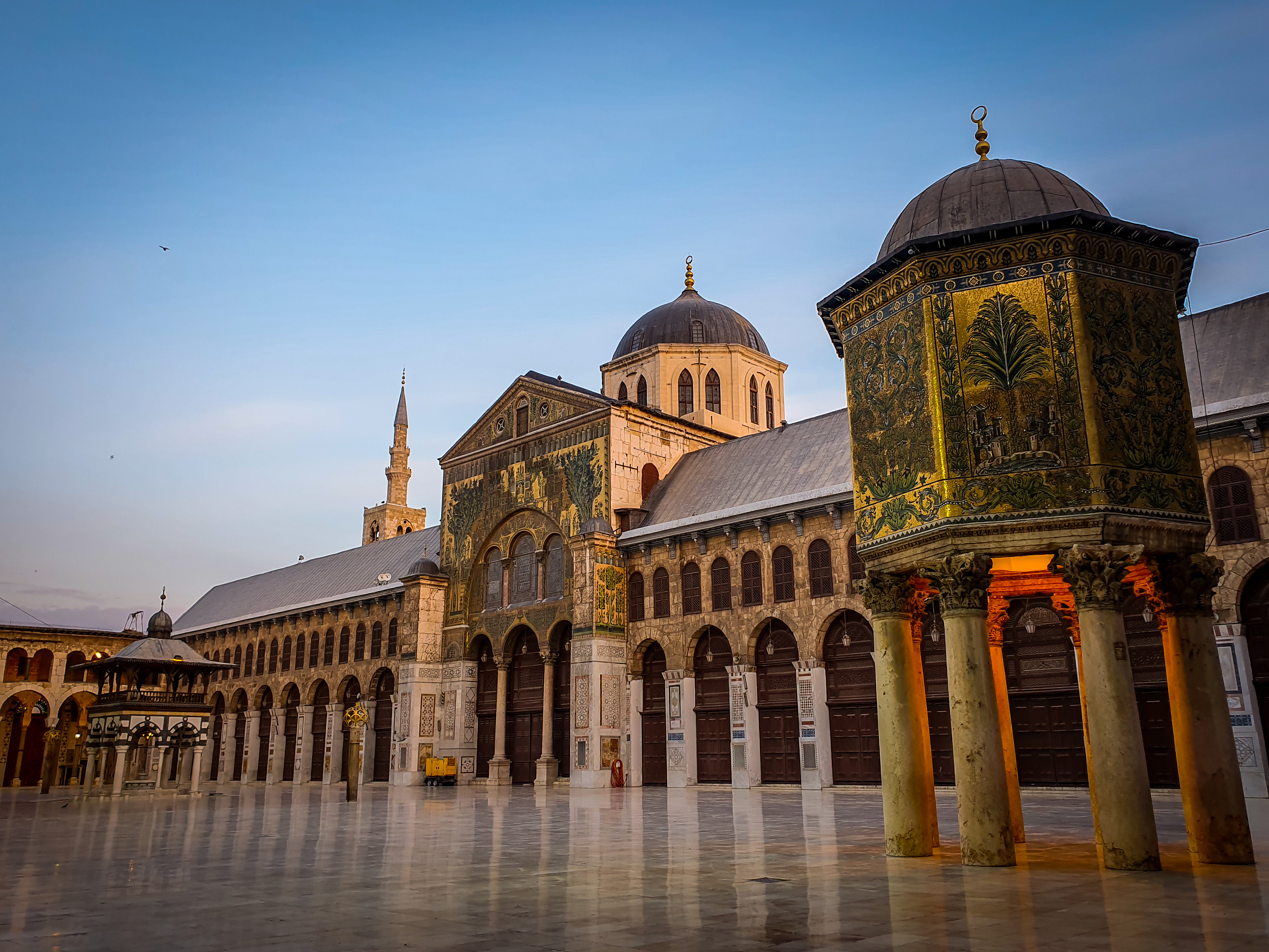
Courtyard of the Umayyad Mosque in Damascus, a building that influenced the design of the Great Mosque of Diyarbakir

The Umayyad Mosque in Damascus is one of the earliest mosques, and has remained culturally important. Many believe the mosque has served as a prototype for or inspired many mosques later built across the Islamic world, the Great Mosque of Diyarbakır included. While it is easy to spot the similarities between the two, significant differences also exist.

Unlike the Great Mosque of Damascus, the Great Mosque of Diyarbakır does not have a dome in the center of its prayer hall. Over the course of history, Turkey has altered the method of covering mosques with large domes, a tradition since the Ottoman period. This is believed to establish a uniquely Turkish style, one that is distinct from the Arabic style of mosque architecture. The Great Mosque of Diyarbakır also has thick pillars instead of the round columns often found in Syria, and lacks certain ornamentation in its mosaics.

The Great Mosque of Diyarbakir is enclosed and its interior space is not visible from the outside. The mosque's minaret was possibly modeled after Christian bell towers. The proportions of the courtyard and prayer hall, as well as the eastern entrance, and the plan of the prayer hall with its central nave and lateral arms are all similar to the Damascus mosque.

When the two mosques are compared, many consider the Great Mosque of Diyarbakır a more modest structure. Some find its architectural features more suitable for reasons of piety. This particular style can also be found in Aleppo and Hama Syria, and other cities of importance in the Islamic world.

== Gallery ==
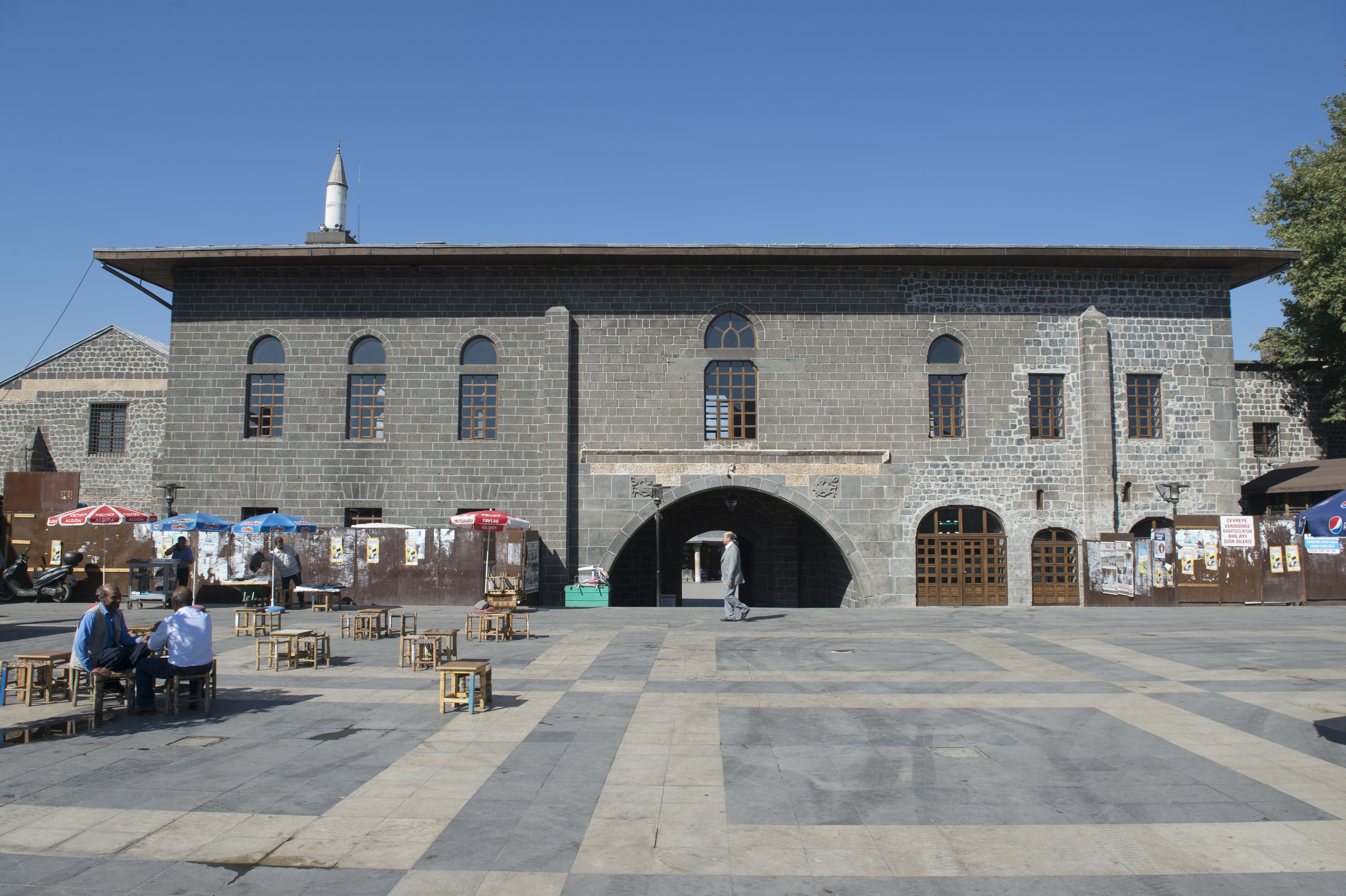
Mosque entrance, leading to the courtyard

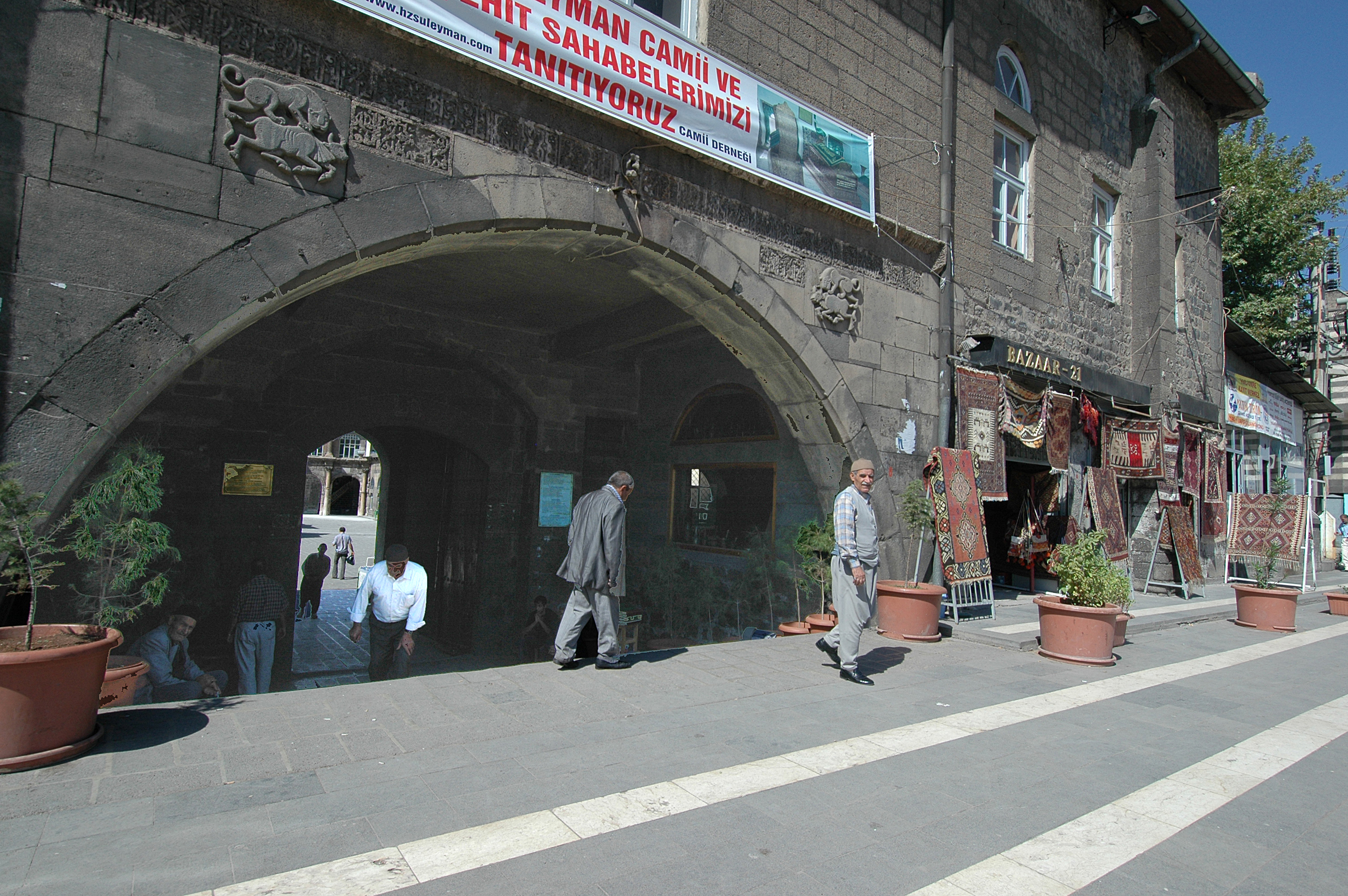
Mosque entrance (closer view)

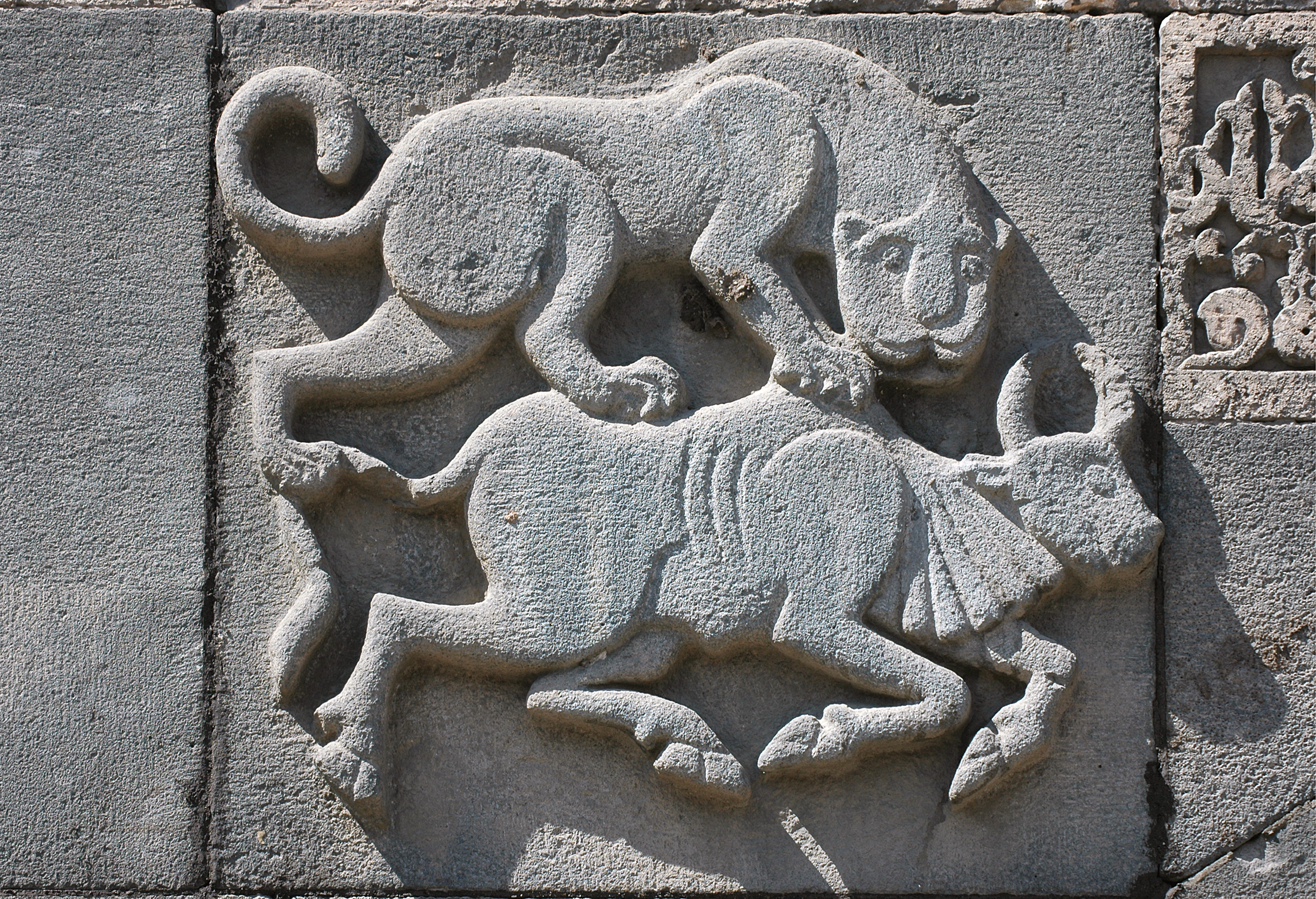
Carving above the entrance

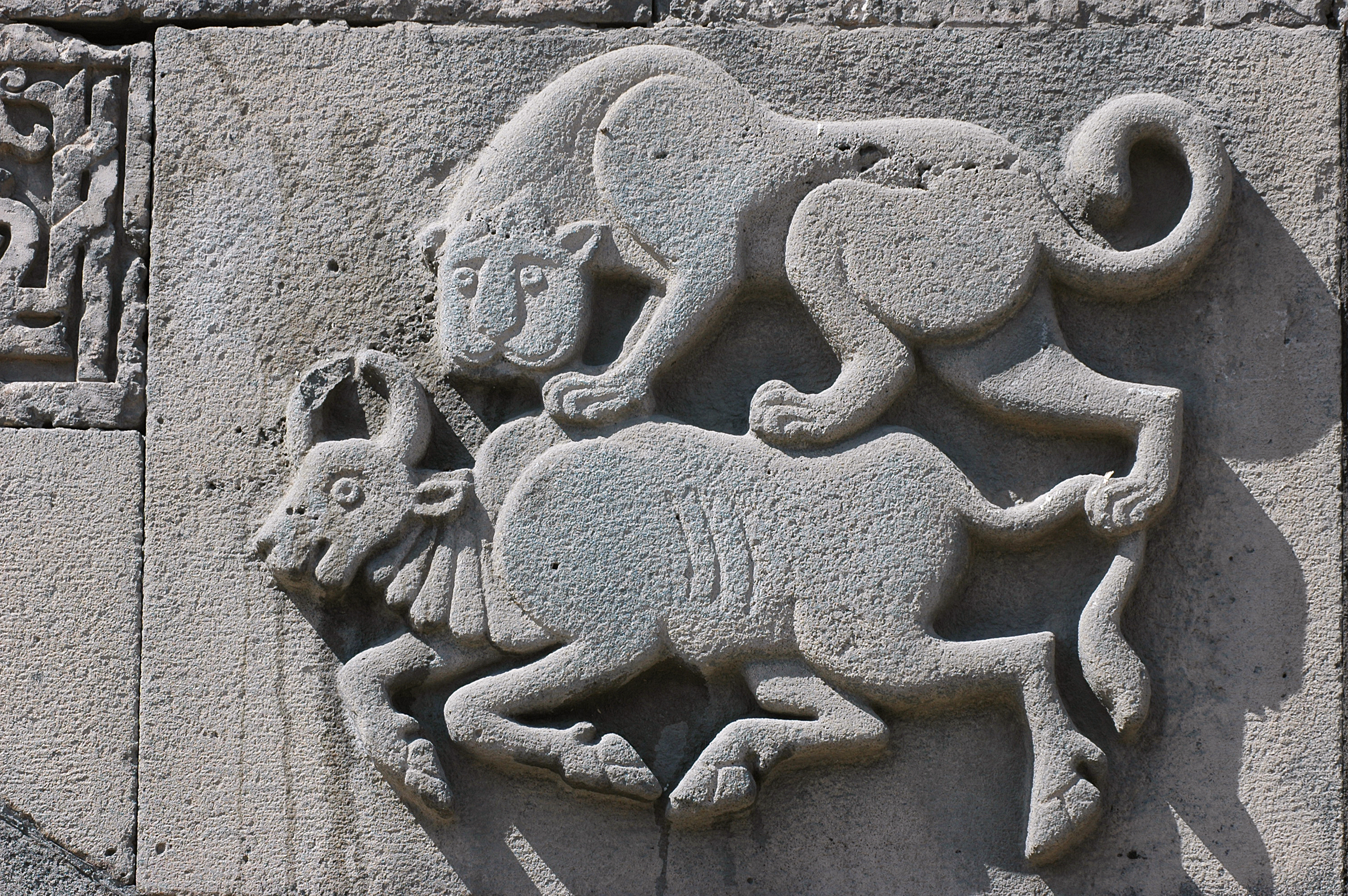
Carving above the entrance

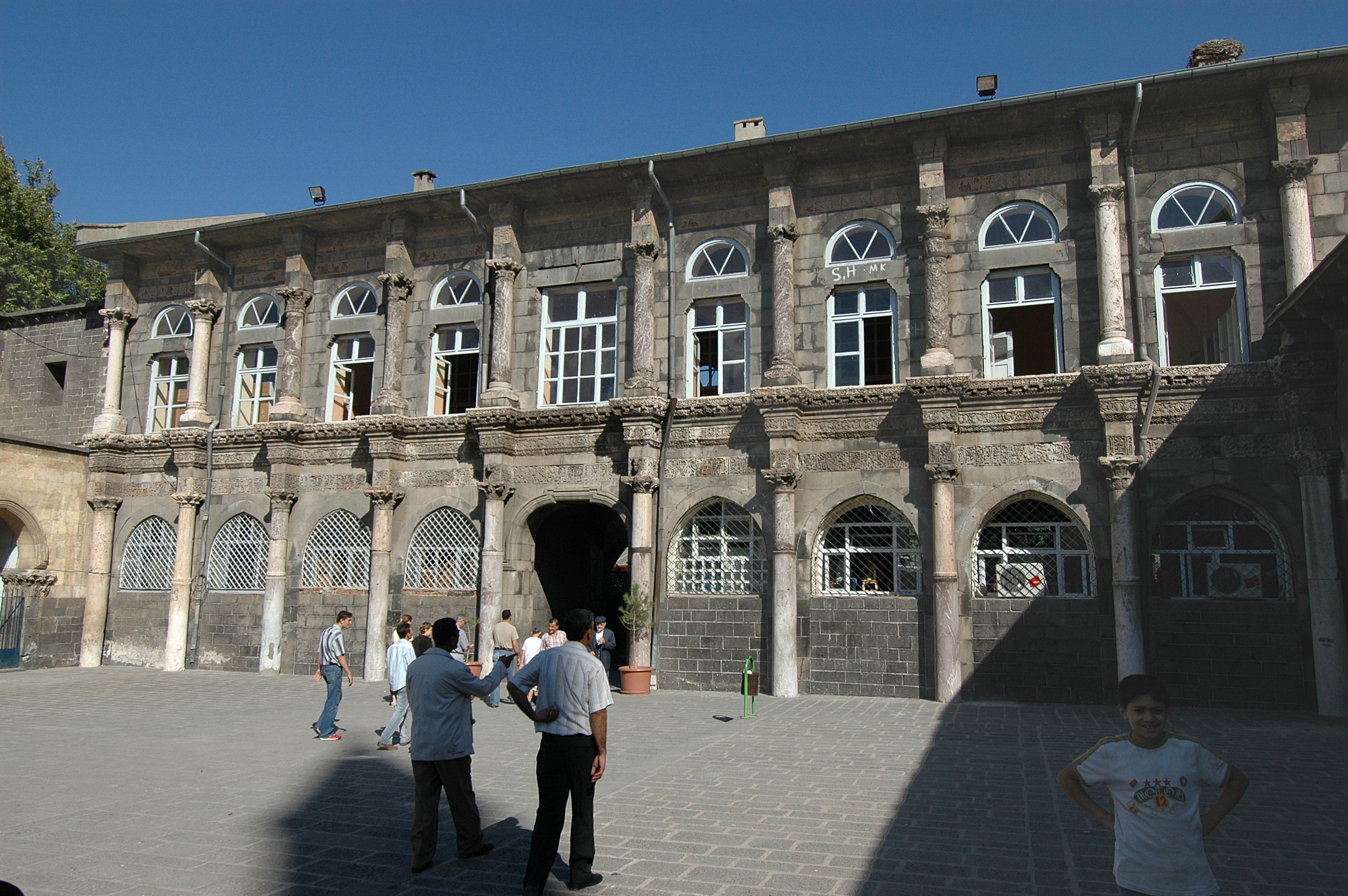
East façade of the courtyard

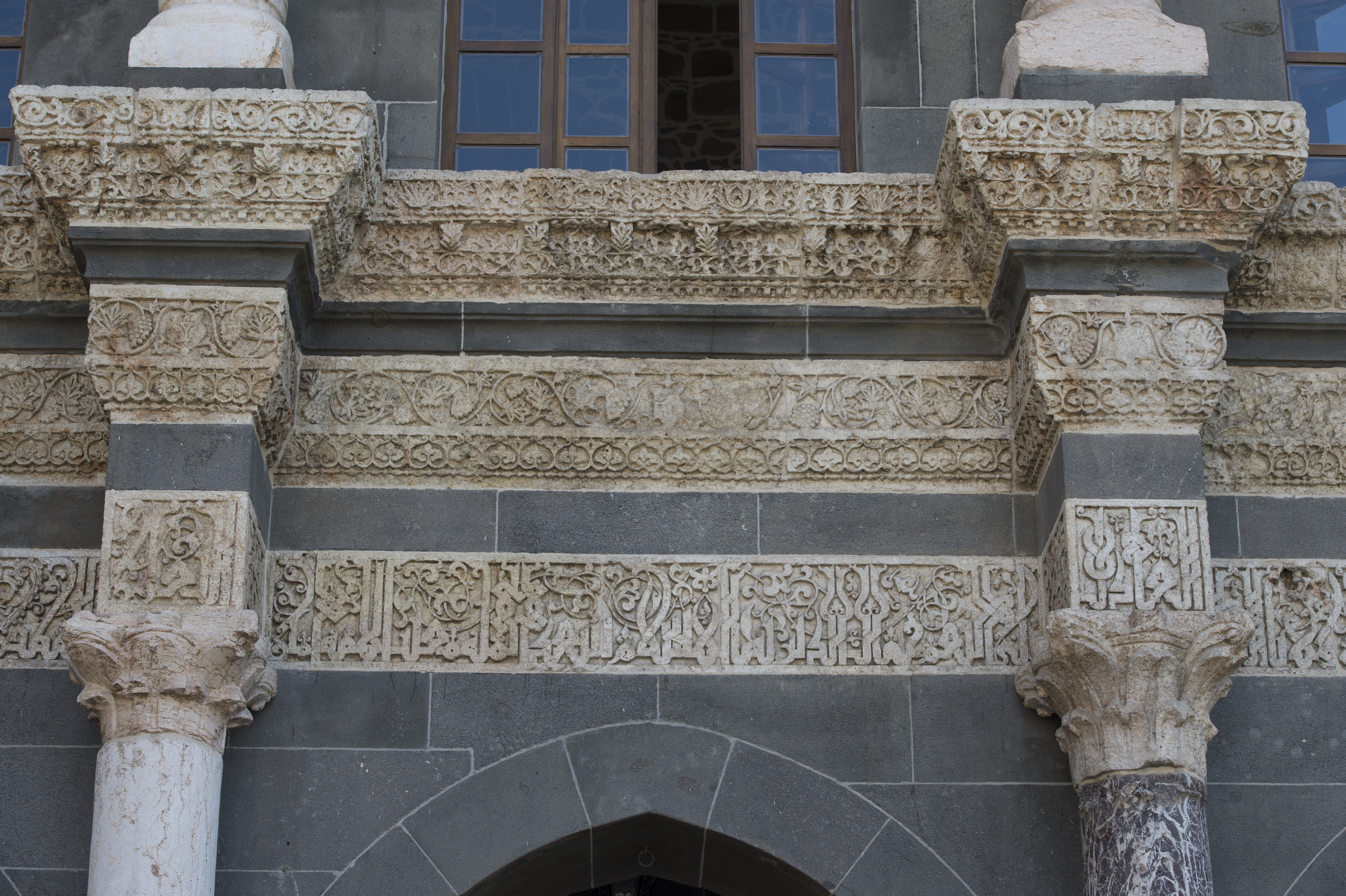
Detail of decoration on courtyard façade

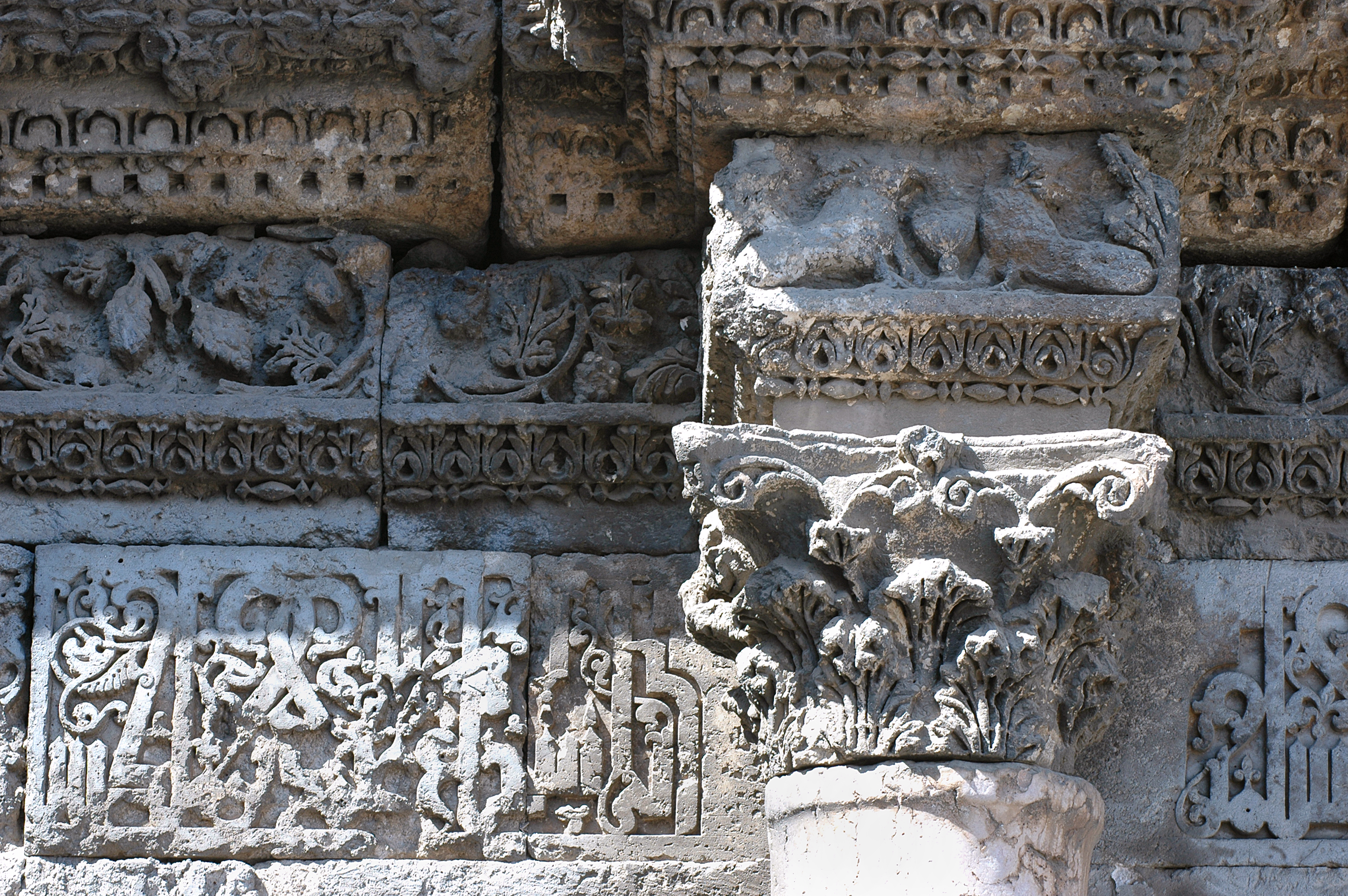
Detail of decoration on courtyard façade

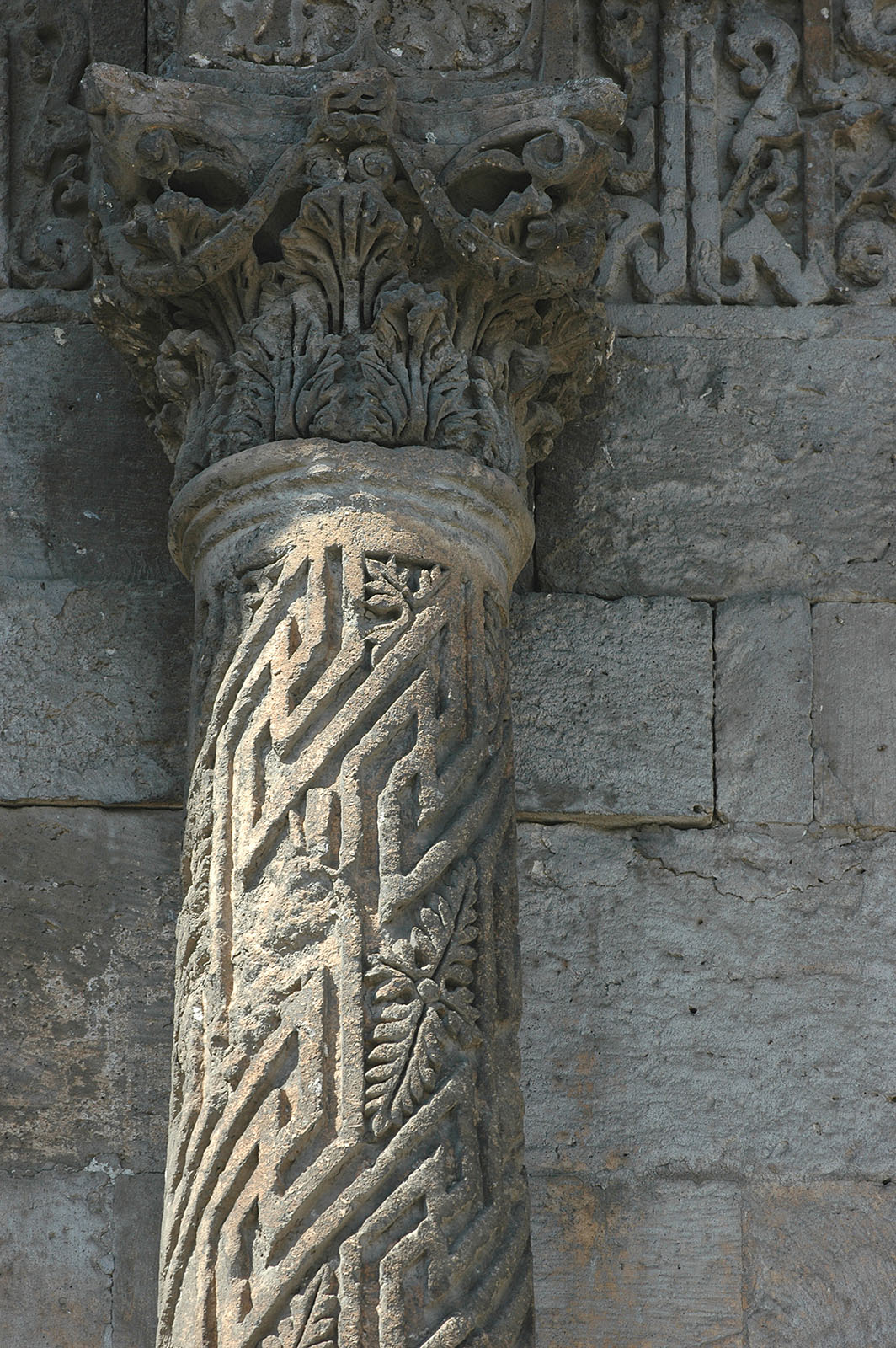
Detail of column in courtyard façade

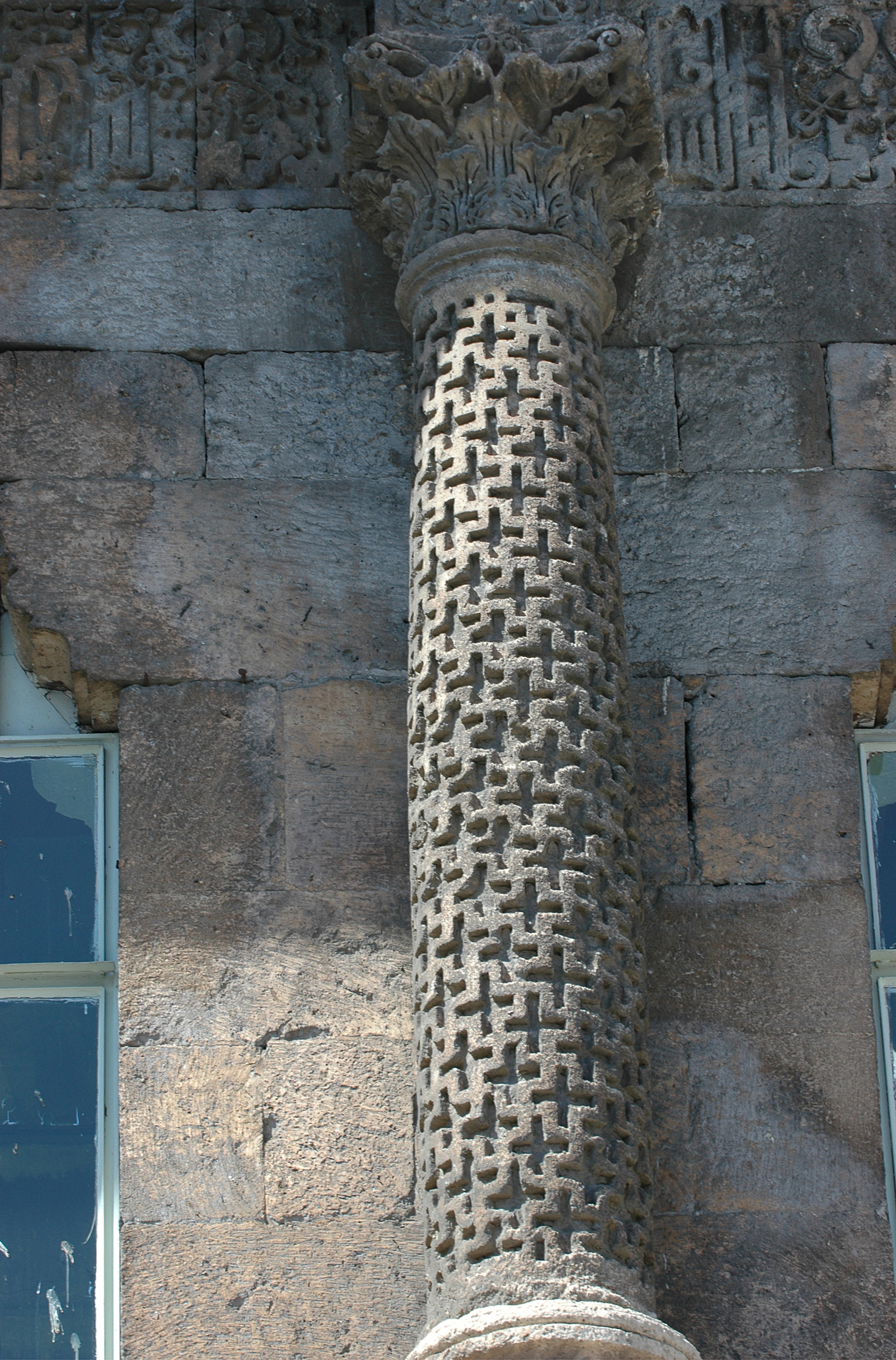
Detail of column in courtyard façade

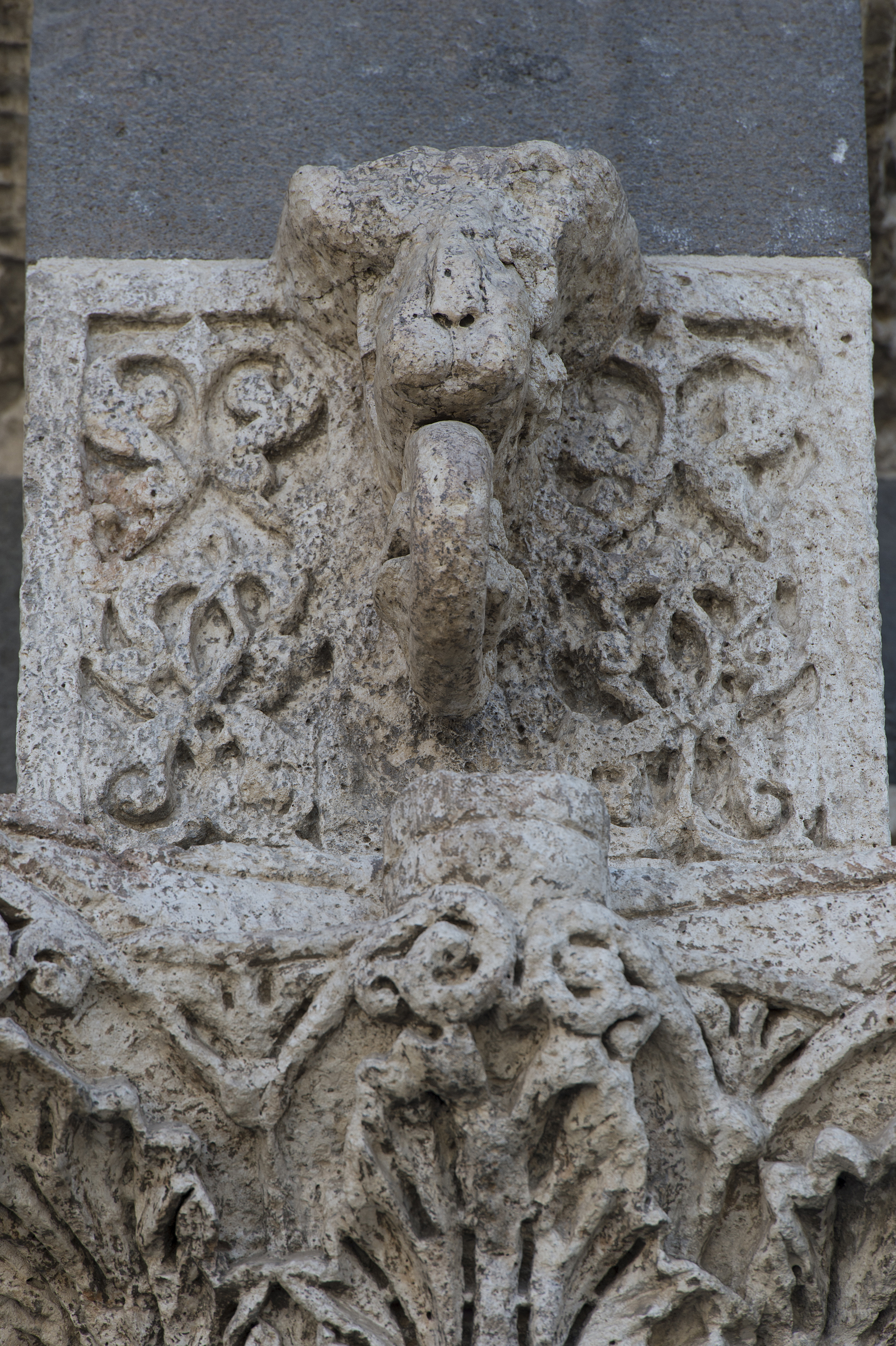
Detail of decoration on courtyard façade

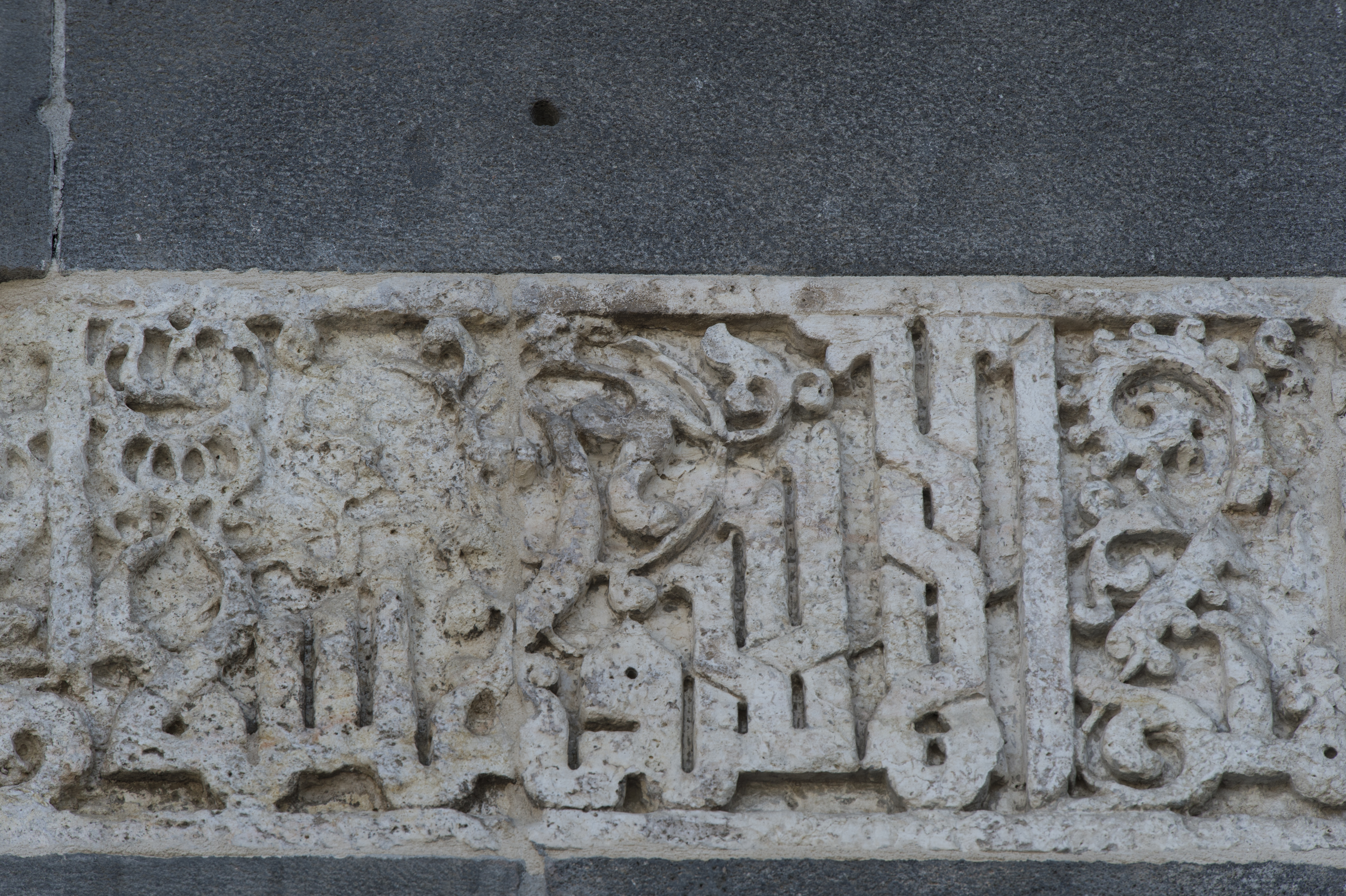
Inscription detail on courtyard façade

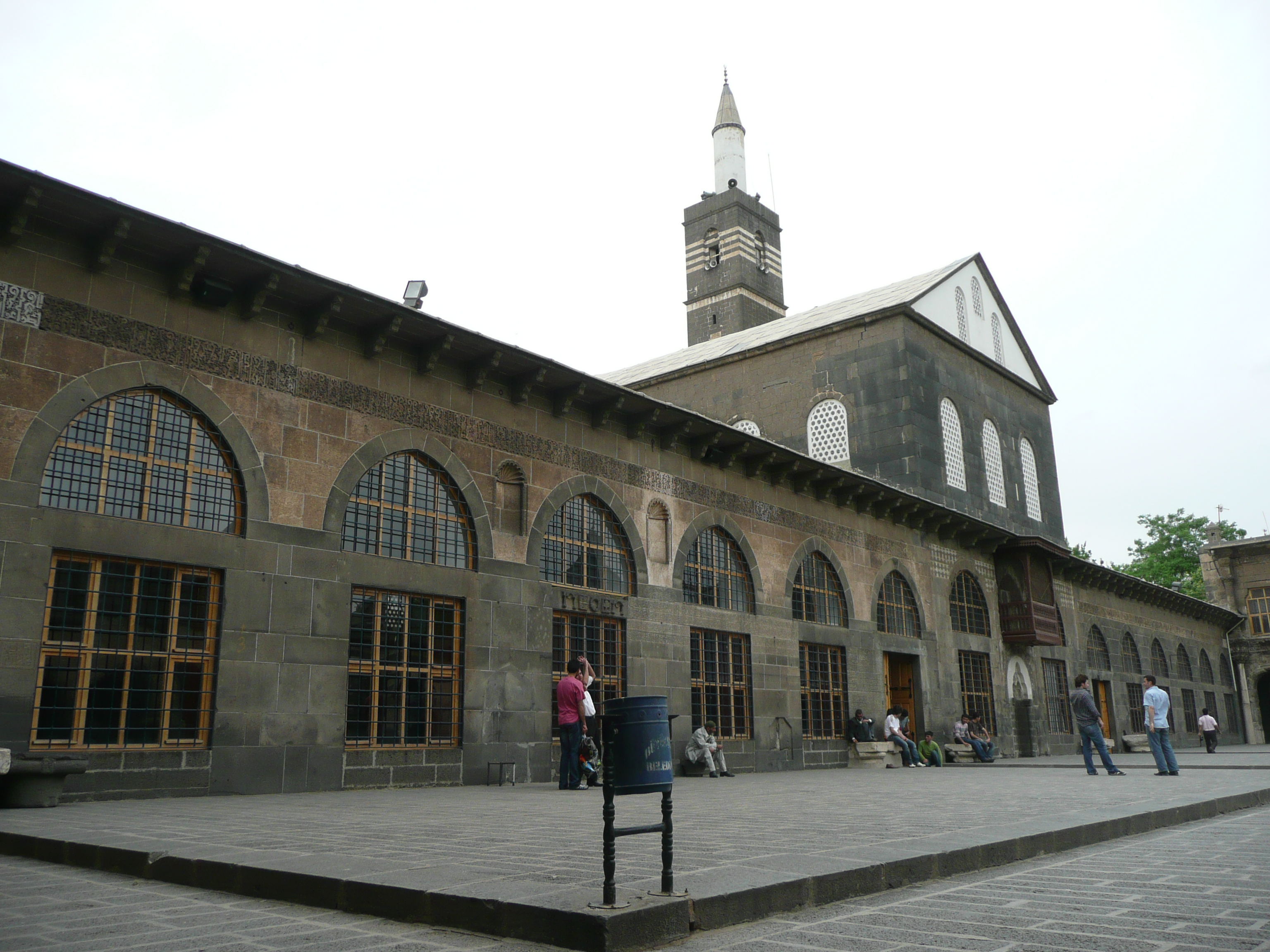
Courtyard façade of the prayer hall

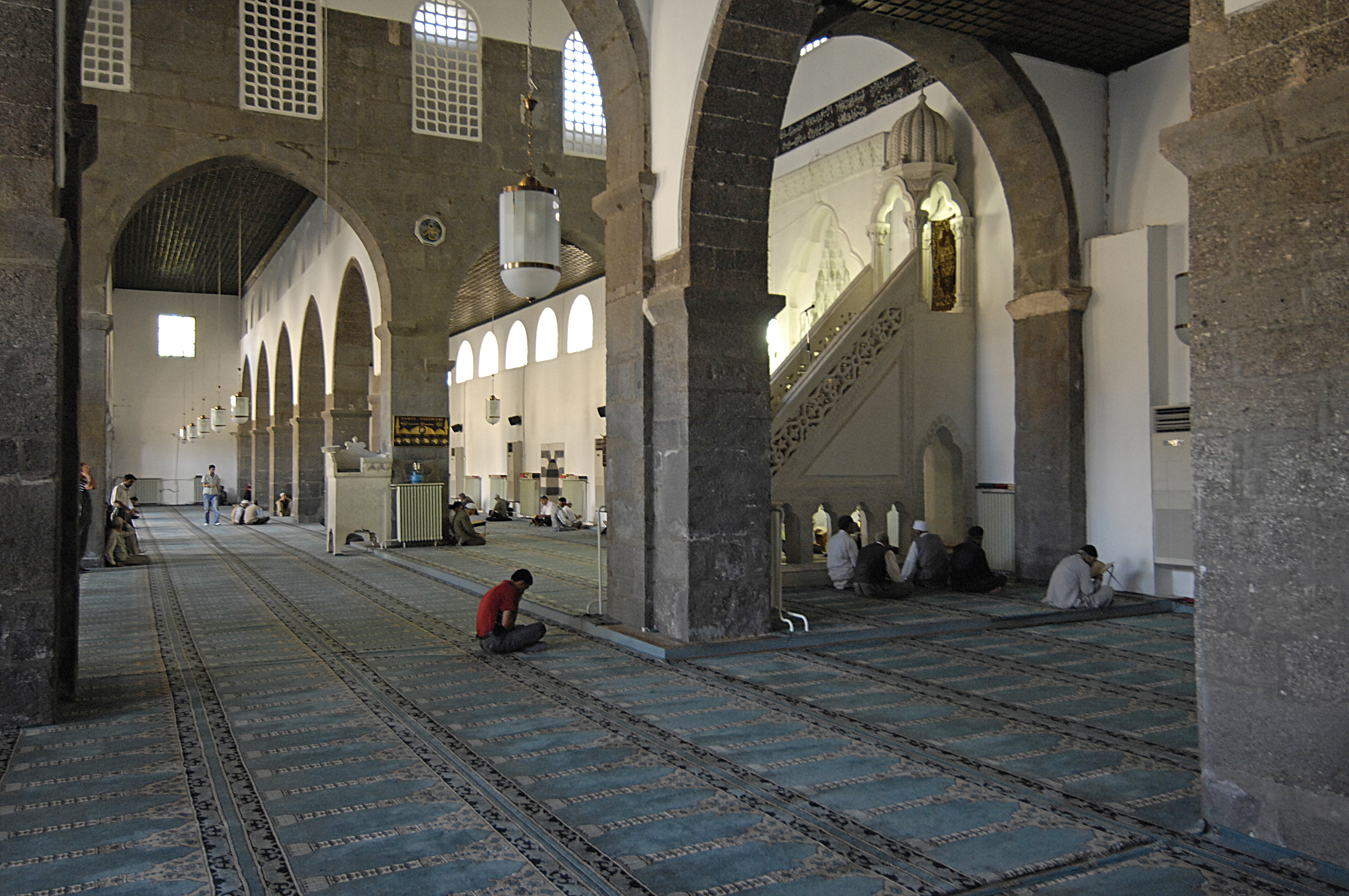
Interior of the prayer hall

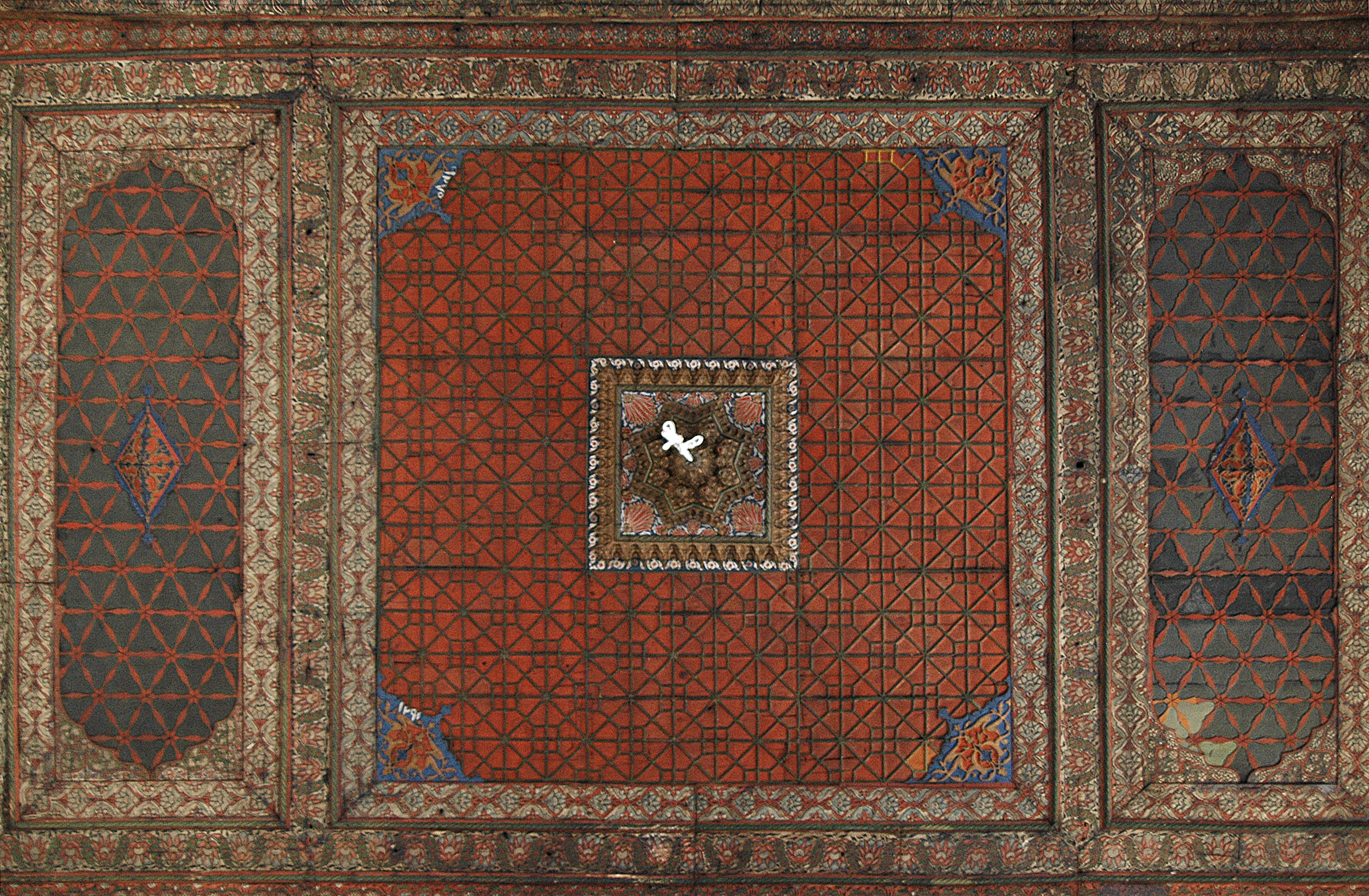
Painted ceiling inside the mosque

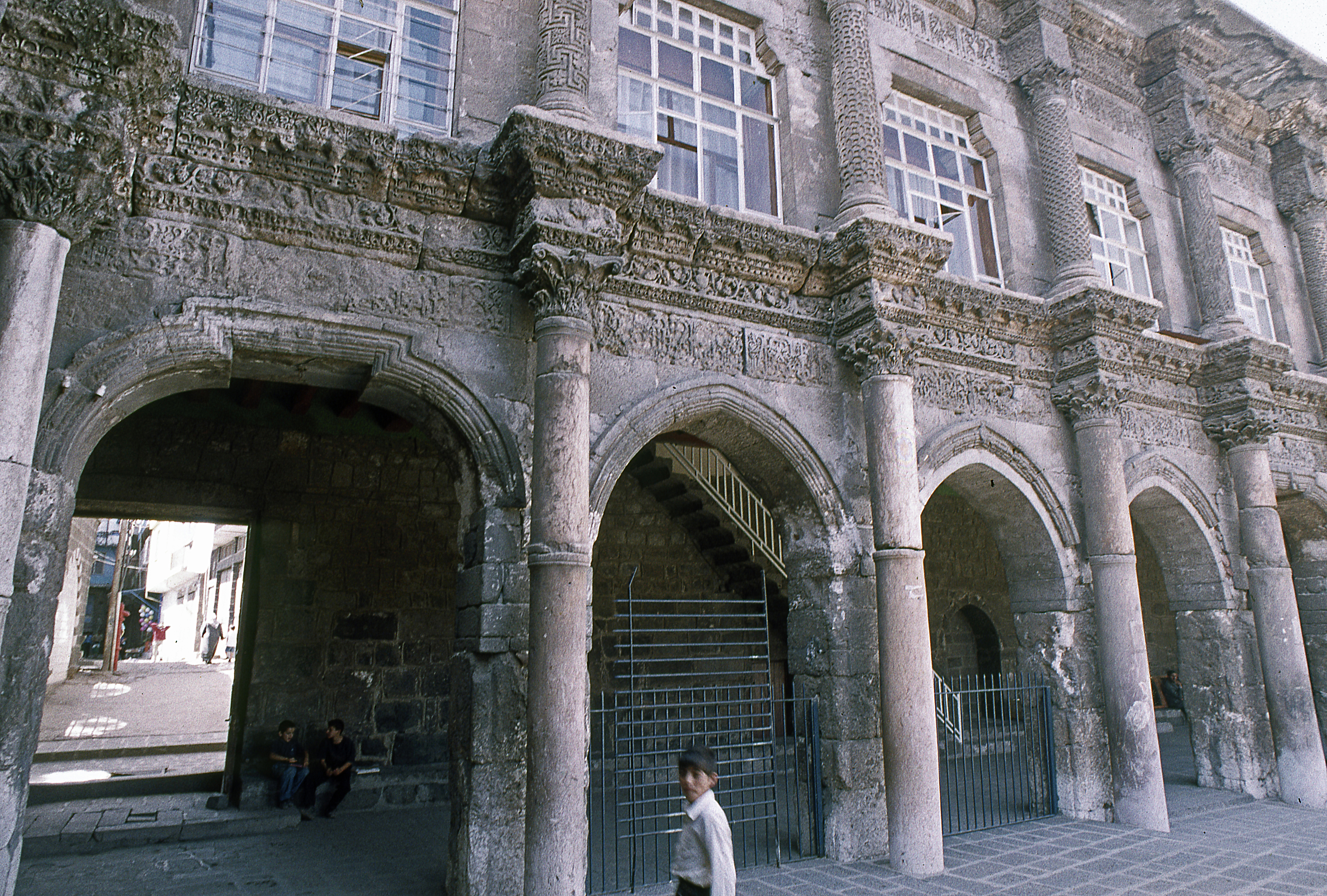
West façade of the courtyard

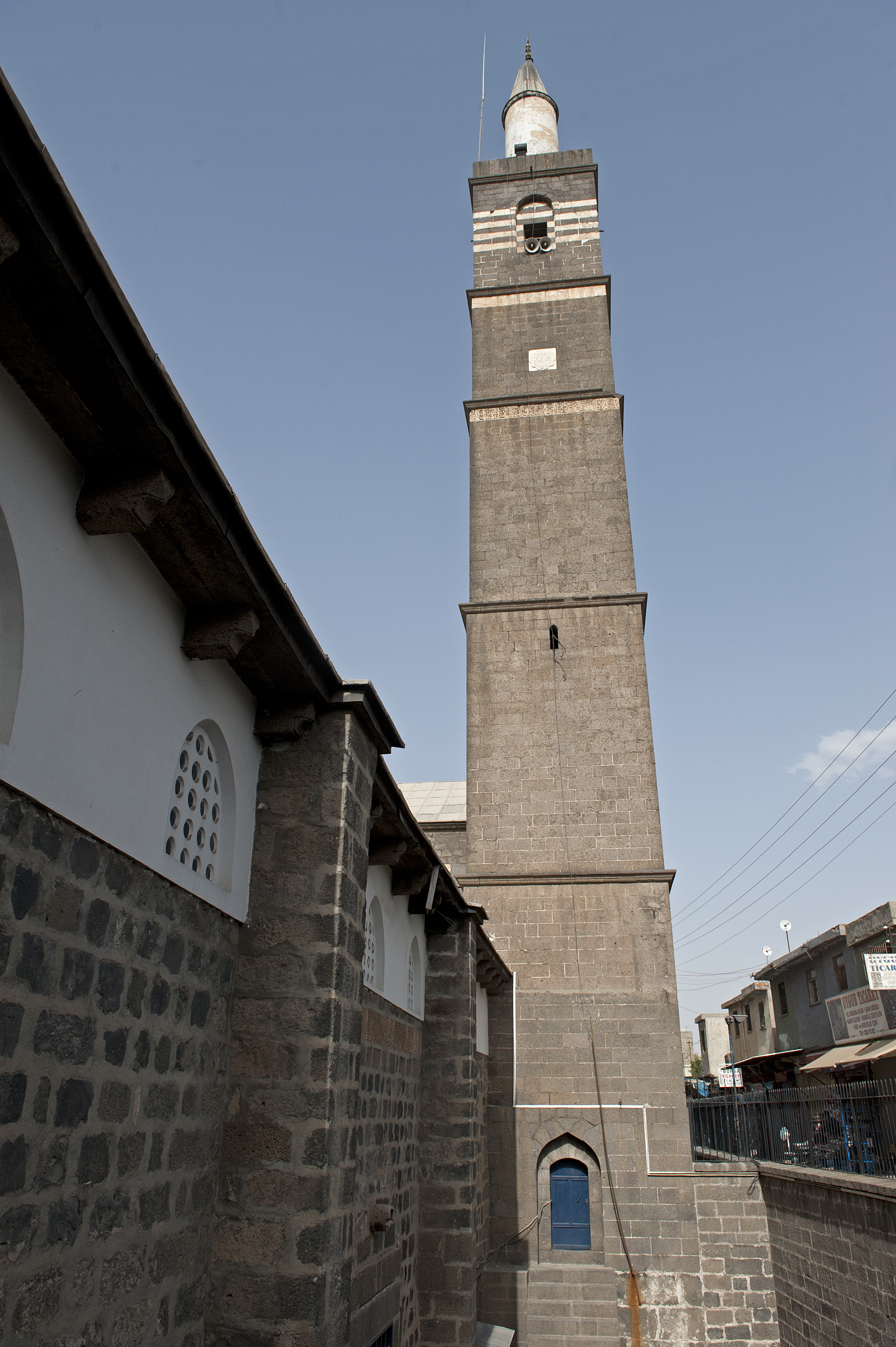
Minaret of the mosque

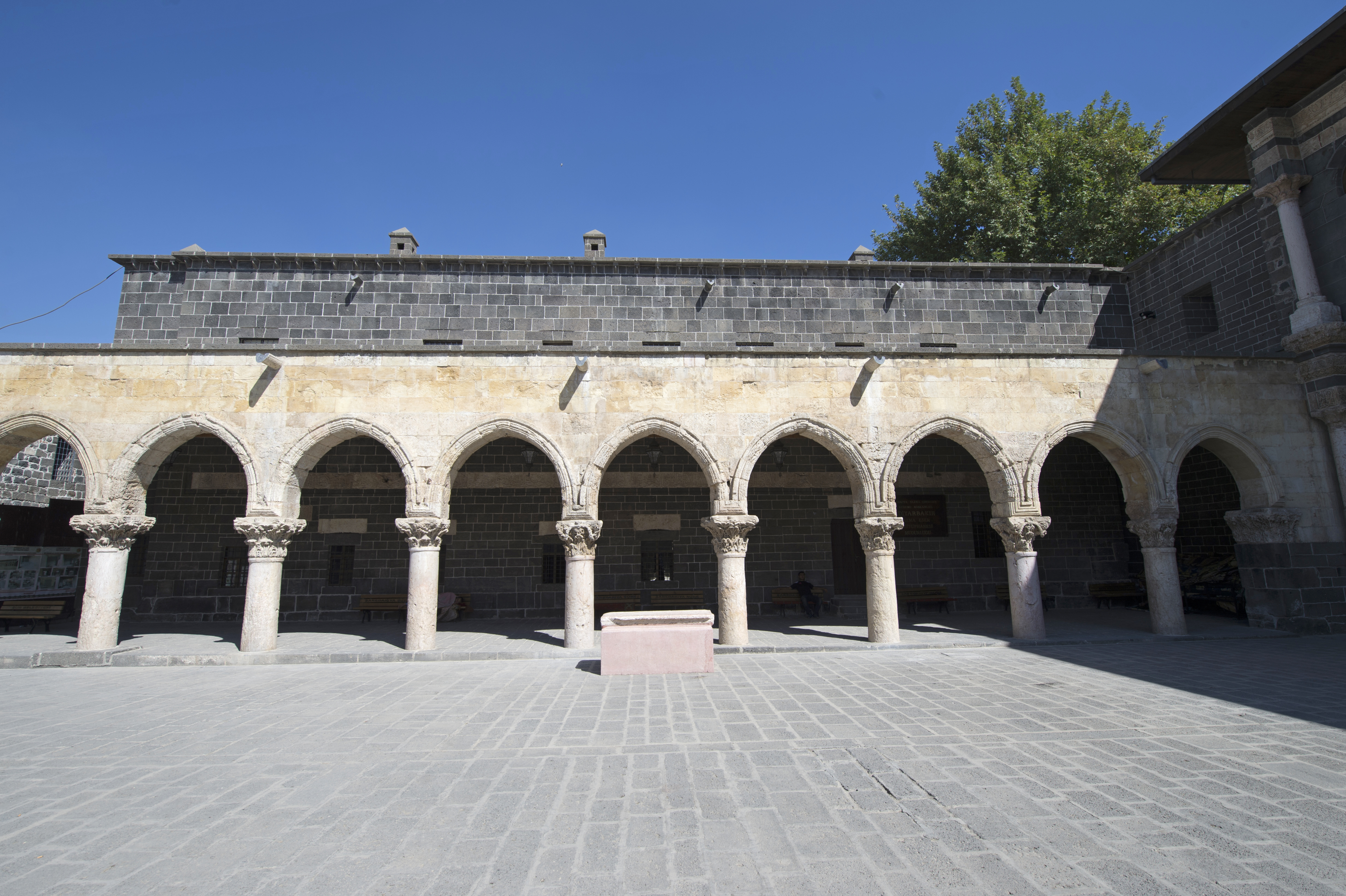
Front façade of the Mesudiye Medresesi, seen from the mosque courtyard

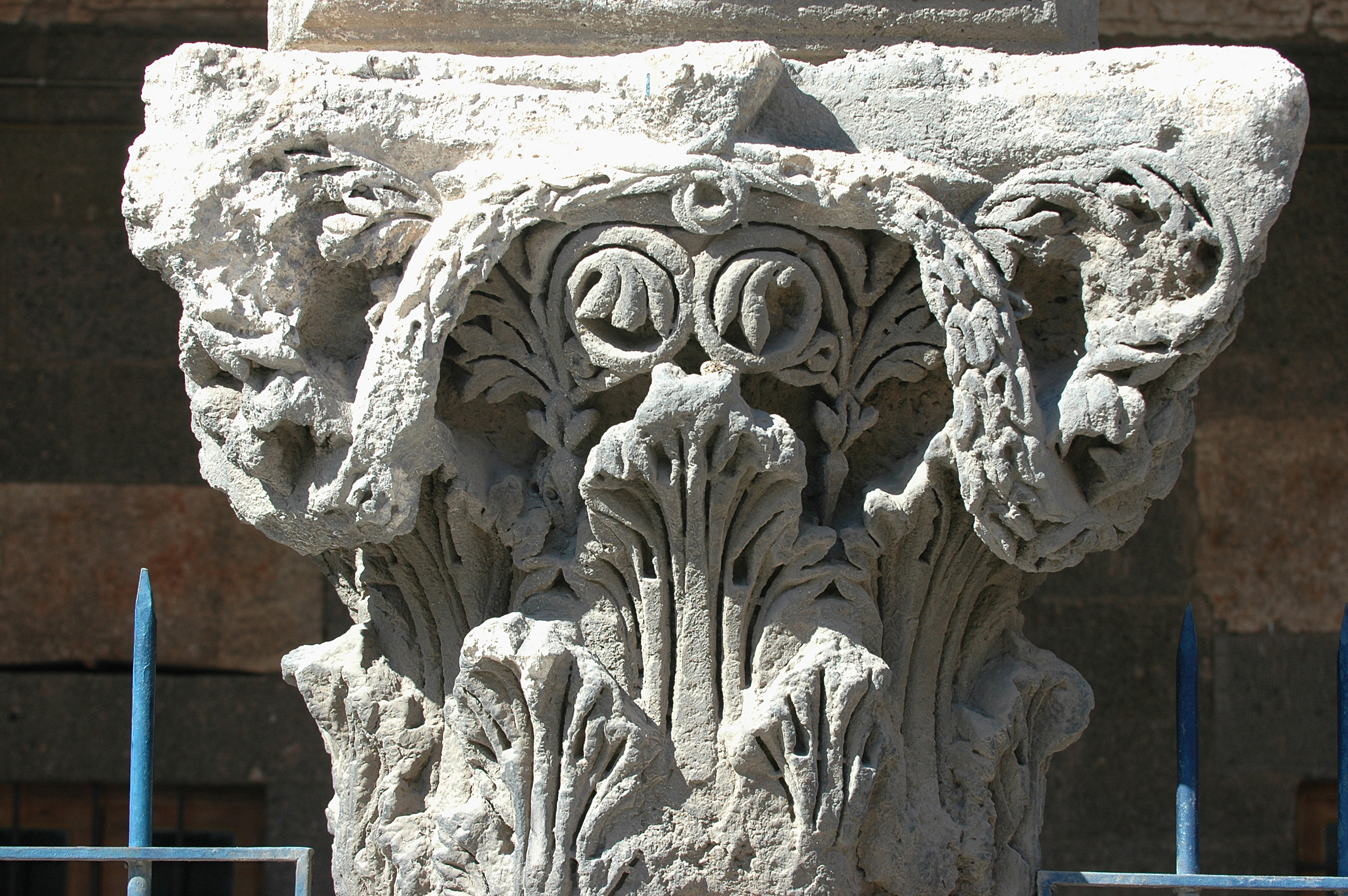
Diyarbakır Mesudiye Medresesi Capital of column

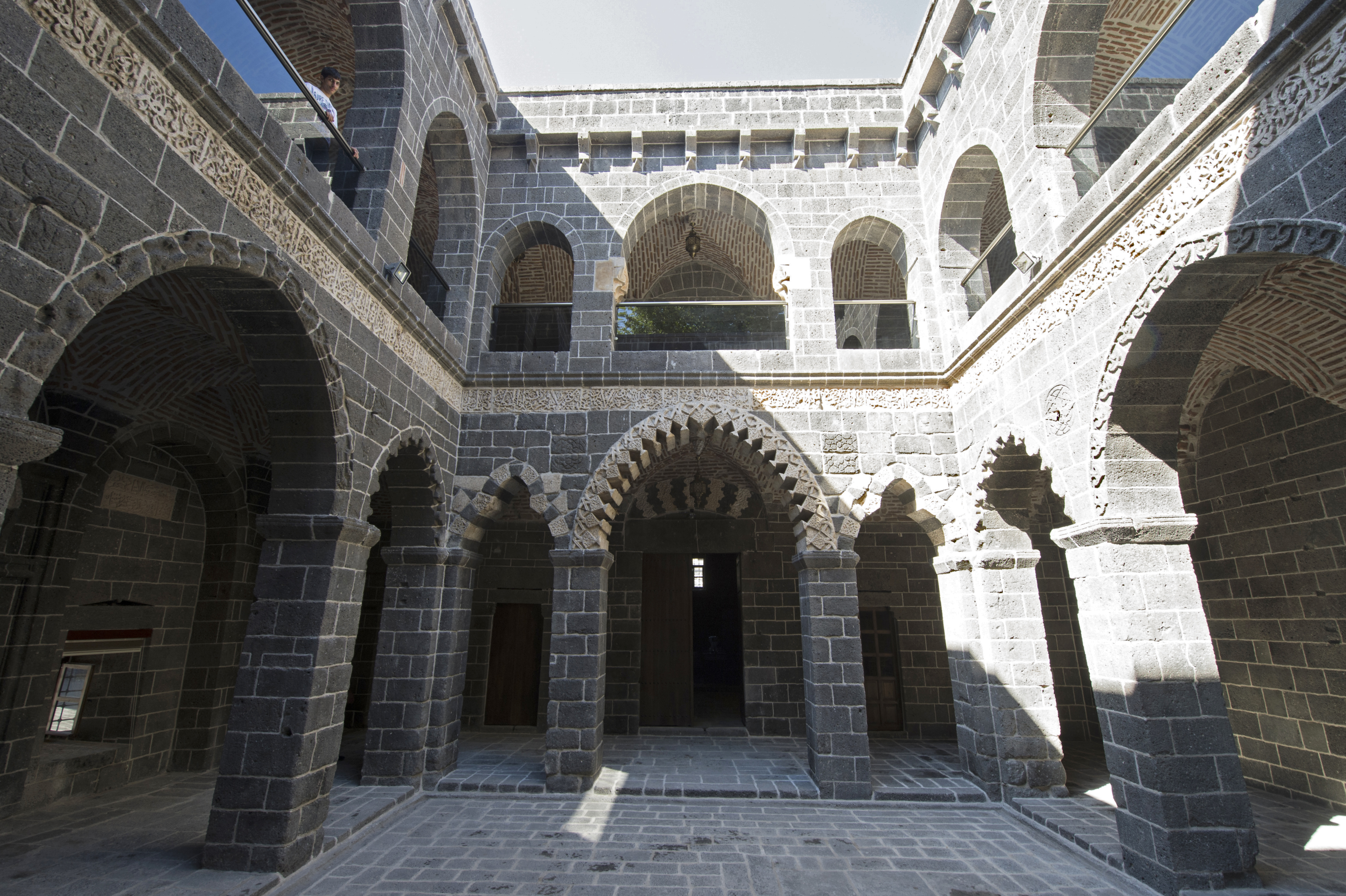
Courtyard of the Mesudiye Medresesi

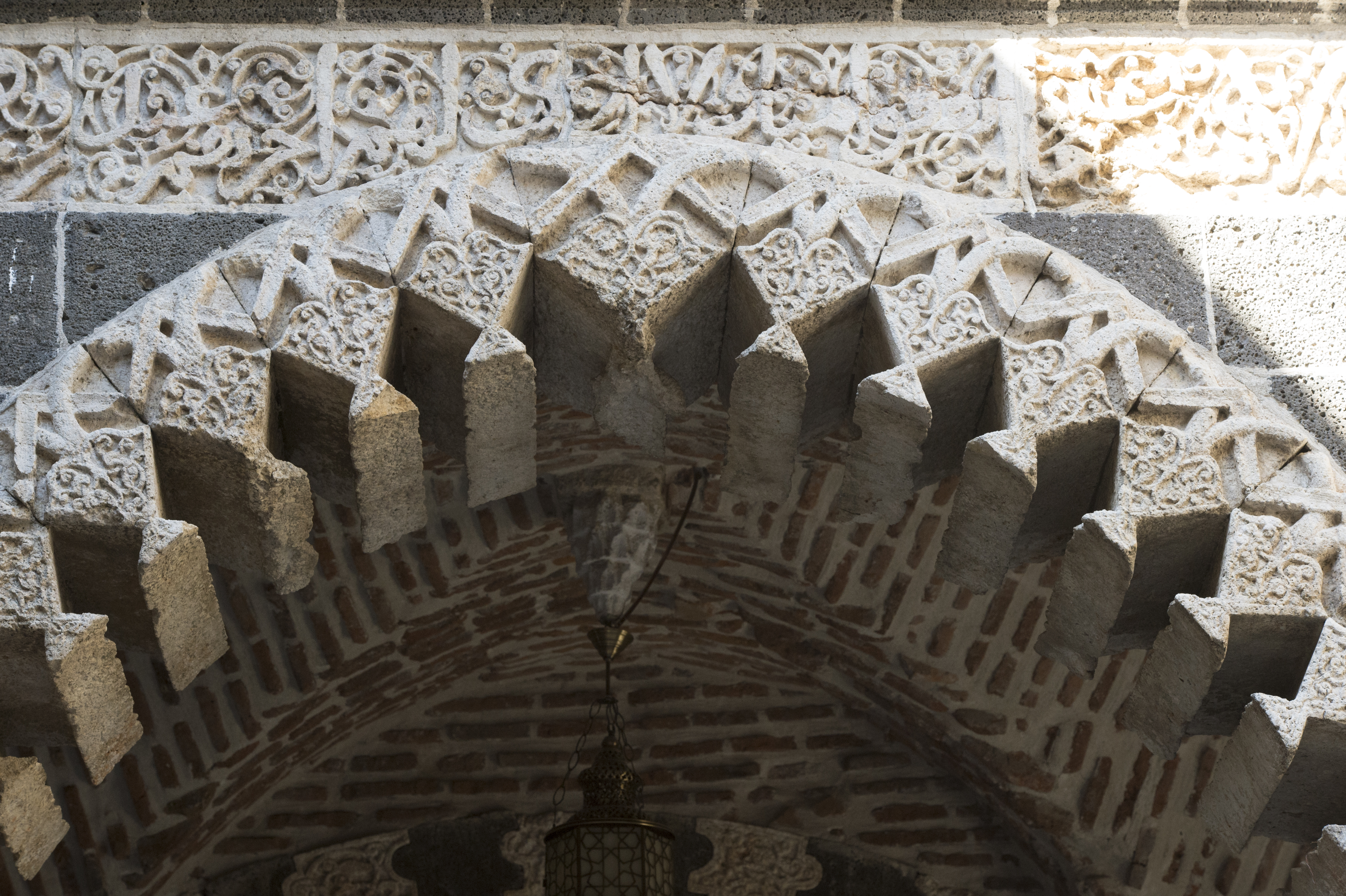
Mesudiye Medresesi: decoration in the courtyard

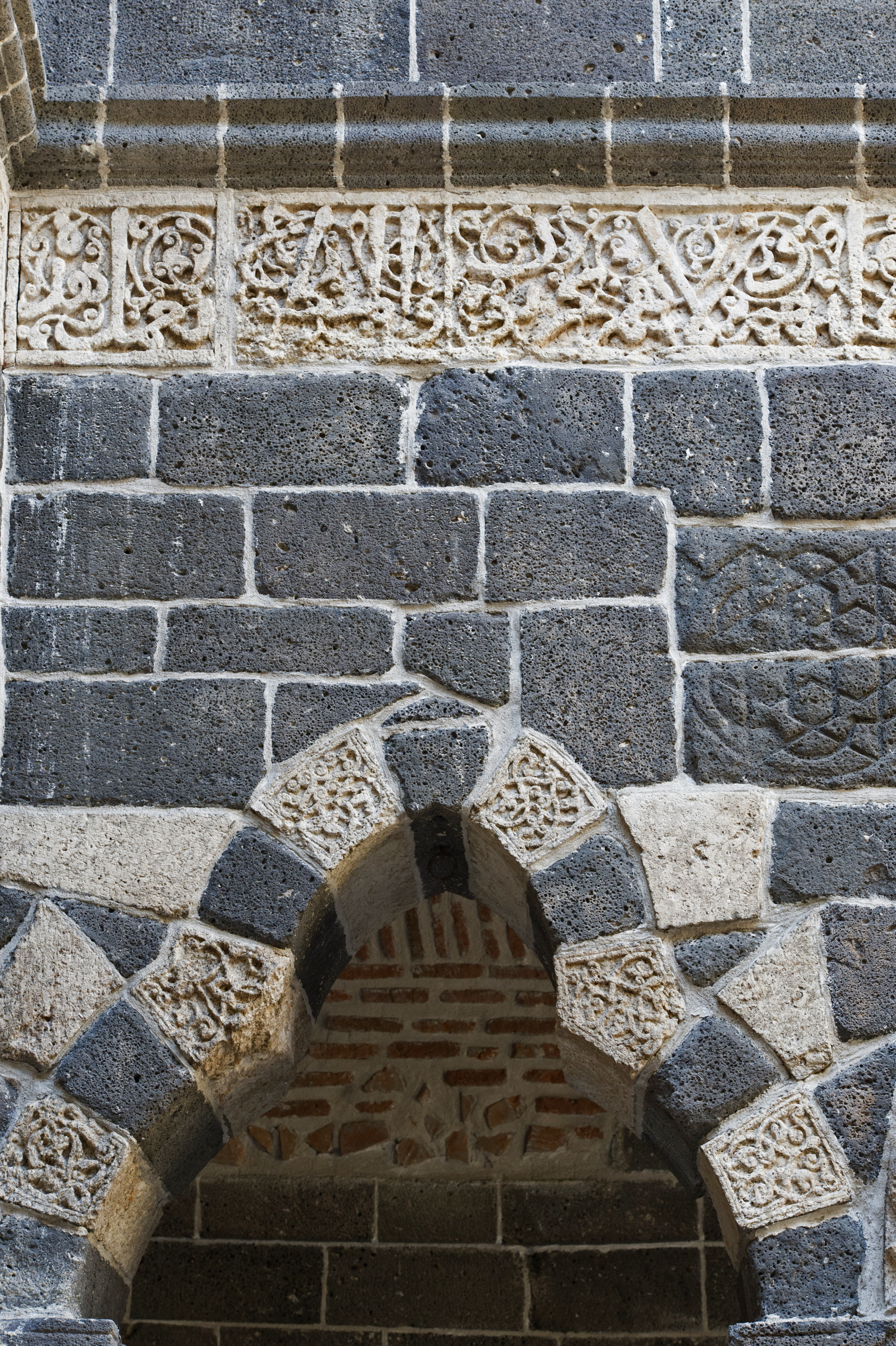
Mesudiye Medresesi: decoration in the courtyard

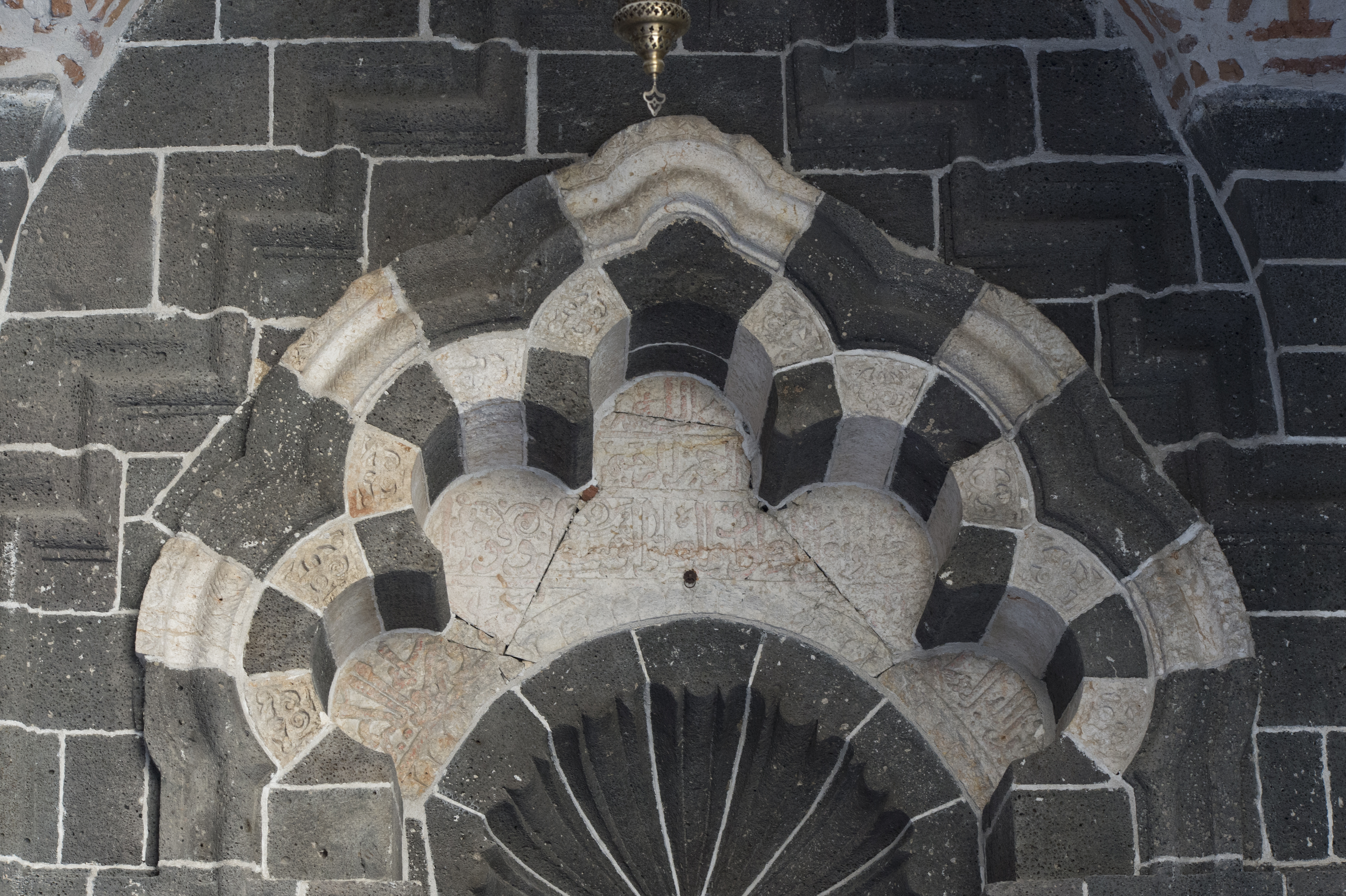
Mesudiye Medresesi: decoration in the courtyard

== See also ==
- List of Turkish Grand Mosques
