= Ancient Anatolia =

Ancient Anatolia may refer to:

- Prehistory of Anatolia
  - Iron Age Anatolia
- Classical Anatolia

== See also ==
- Ancient kingdoms of Anatolia
- Anatolian peoples
