= Beylik of Lâdik =

Historical country

Lâdik (Turkish pronunciation: [ˈladic]) or Inanjids (Modern Turkish: İnançoğulları Beyliği ) was an Anatolian beylik with its capital in Denizli. It was one of the frontier principalities established by Oghuz Turkish clans after the decline of Seljuk Sultanate of Rûm. Its name derives from that of Laodicea on the Lycus.

The current Turkish province of Denizli was named the sanjak (sub-province) of Lâdik till the early years of the Republic of Turkey.

== List of rulers ==
Bey	Reign	Notes
Mehmed Bey	1261–1262	
Ali Bey	1262–1305	
İnanç Bey	1305–1335	
Murâd Arslan	1335–1362	
İshâk Bey	1362–1368	

== See also ==
- List of Sunni Muslim dynasties
