= List of ancient kingdoms of Anatolia =

Below is a list of ancient kingdoms in Anatolia. Anatolia (most of modern Turkey) was the home of many ancient kingdoms. This list does not include the earliest kingdoms, which were merely city states, except those that profoundly affected history. It also excludes foreign invaders (such as The Achaemenid Empire, the Macedonian Empire, Roman Empire etc.).

== List of kingdoms ==
=== Bronze and Iron Age ===
- Notes: Before Achaemenid conquest (546 BC)

The first column shows the name of the kingdom or the state, the second column shows the name of the capital, the third column shows the life span of the state. However, there are uncertainties both in the second and in the third columns. In particular, the first dates (of emergence) are approximate.

| Name of the kingdom | Capital | Duration (BC) |
|---|---|---|
| Aeolia | Smyrna | 8th century - 6th century |
| Arzawa | Apasa (Ephesus?) | |
| Assuwa league | | 1300-1250 |
| Caria | Halicarnassus | 11th century - 6th century |
| Diauehi | | 1118-760 |
| Doria | | 1200-580 |
| Gurgum | Marqas | ?-711 |
| Hatti | Hattum^{a} | 2500-1780 |
| Hayasa-Azzi | | 1500-1290 |
| Hittites | Hattusa | 1700-1180 |
| Ionia | Delos | 1070-545 |
| Isuwa | | 1630-1200 |
| Karuwa | | 1250-560 |
| Kaskia | | 1430-1200 |
| Kizzuwatna | Kummanni (Comana ?) | 1600-1220 |
| Kummuh | Kummuh | ?-705 |
| Neša | Kanesh | 2800-1720 |
| Lycia | Xanthos, Patara | 1250-546 |
| Lydia | Sardis | 1200-546 |
| Luwia | | 2300-1400 |
| Lukka | | 2000-1183 |
| Mitanni | Washukanni | 1690-1300 |
| Miletus | Miletus | |
| Pala | | ?-1178 |
| Neo-Hittites | Carchemish | 1180-700 |
| Phrygia | Gordium | 1200-700 |
| Troy | Troy | 3000-700 |

=== Classical Age ===
- Notes: After Partition of Babylon (323 BC)

| Name of the kingdom | Capital | Duration (BC) |
|---|---|---|
| Antigonids | Antigonea (Nicaea (?)) | 306-168 |
| Armenia | Artaxata, Armavir, Tigranocerta | 331-1 |
| Bithynia | Nicomedia | 297-74 |
| Cappadocia | Mazaka | 322-130 |
| Commagene | Samosata | 163-72 |
| Galatia | Ancyra | 280-64 |
| Paphlagonia | Gangra | 5th century - 183 |
| Pergamon | Pergamon | 281-133 |
| Pontus | Amasia | 291-62 |

In the table it can be seen that there are no new local kingdoms between the 9th and 3rd centuries BC. This era roughly corresponds to foreign rule (Achaemenid Empire and Macedonian Empire.)

== See also ==
- History of Anatolia
- Medieval states in Anatolia

== References and notes ==
a. Andreas Schachner 2011, Hattuscha: the oldest settlement is of 6000 BC; between 3200-2500 there is no habitation. Hattum is the Akkadian name for Hattus(sa), the Hattian name is probably Ha-at-ti, so the same as the name of the land.(Oǧuz Soysal 2004, Hattischer Wortschatz in hethithiser Text Überlieferung). The Hattians lived in several kingdoms (city-states)in the Kizirl bassin of the Bronze Age.
