= Beylik of Tanrıbermiş =

The Beylik of Tanrıbermiş was a small, shortlived Turkish principality in western Anatolia (modern Turkey) during the late 11th century.

After the Battle of Manzikert in 1071, Oghuz Turkmen (Turkoman) tribes led by ghazi warriors began to settle in hitherto Byzantine-controlled Anatolia. A ghazi named Tanrıbermiş was one of them. Beginning by 1074 he founded a beylik (principality) in western Anatolia. His realm included Philadelphia (modern Alaşehir) and Ephesus. However, during the First Crusade in 1098, his territory was recovered by the forces of the Byzantine Emperor Alexios I Komnenos.

The Turks were unable to re-establish permanent control over any section of western Anatolia until the end of the 13th century when Turkish Ghazis established a permanent foothold in the region. However, it wasn’t until the early 14th century that the region was completely overrun by the Turks and new Beyliks, such as the Aydinids, were established.

Some Byzantine strongholds were able to hold out in the region for longer, with the final city, Philadelphia, not being captured by the Turks until 1390.
