= Inalids =

Anatolian beylik of the 12th century

The Inalids (the sons of İnal or Yinal, Turkish: İnaloğulları or Yinaloğulları) was the name of a small Turkish beylik (principality) which reigned in a small territory around Amid (modern Diyarbakır in Turkey) between 1098–1183.

Melikşah, the sultan of the Great Seljuk Empire, died in 1092. After his death, the western provinces of the empire began to disintegrate. In 1095, the governor of the city of Amid (modern Diyarbakır) was a Turkmen lord (Turkish: bey) named Sadr. He defeated other Turkmen lords who tried to capture Amid. After his death his son İnal (Yinal, Inal) declared independence. However, İnal soon died and during the reign of İbrahim, the small principality had to accept the suzerainty of its more powerful neighbours; first the Seljuks of Syria, then the Great Seljuk Empire, then the Seljuk Sultanate of Rûm (1105) and finally the Sökmenli (Ahlatshahs) (1109).

During the reign of Ilaldı, the beylik of Inaloğulları was able to recover. He conquered some territory from the Sökmenli and in 1124 he also fought against Ismailism, a religious sect. In 1133 a new and more powerful enemy appeared at the south; the Zangids. Although Zangids defeated Ilaldı in the battle, they weren't able to capture the city.

After Ilaldı's death in 1142, the beylik had to accept the suzerainty of the Artukids who captured most of its territory. Moreover, the family of Nisan, once the viziers of the beylik, became the de facto rulers of the beylik. On 9 May 1183, the Artukids who allied with Saladin captured Amid and put an end to the beylik.

== Beys ==
- Sadr (1095–1096)
- İnal (1096–1098)
- İbrahim (1098–1110)
- İlaldı (1110–1142)
- Mahmud (1142–1183)

== Genealogy of House of Inal ==
House of Inal

Inalid Beylik

Sadr r. 1095–1098
Inal r. 1098–1098
Ibrahim r. 1098–1110
Ilaldi r. 1110–1142
Mahmud r. 1142–1183
