= Seydiler (disambiguation) =

Seydiler is a district town in Kastamonu Province, Turkey.

Seydiler may also refer to the following places in Turkey:

- Seydiler District, Kastamonu Province
- Seydiler, İscehisar, a town in Afyonkarahisar Province
- Seydiler, Manavgat, a village in Antalya Province
- Seydiler, Tefenni, a village in Burdur Province
