= İhsangazi =

- Municipality
- Location within Turkey
- Coordinates: 41°12′14″N 33°33′18″E
- Country: Turkey
- Province: Kastamonu
- District: İhsangazi

Government
  - Mayor: Hayati Sağlık (MHP)
- Elevation: 1,020 m (3,350 ft)
- Population (2021): 2,891
- Time zone: UTC+3 (TRT)
- Area code: 0366
- Climate: Cfb
- Website: www.ihsangazi.bel.tr

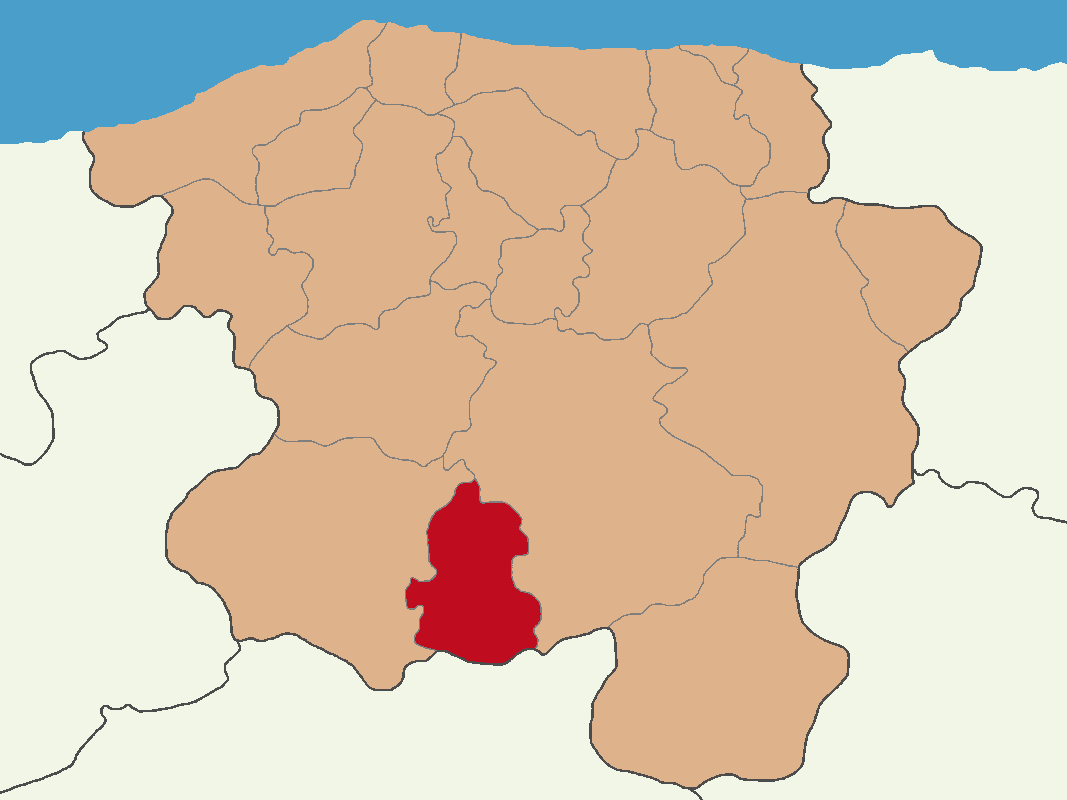
İhsangazi (red) in the Kastamonu (brown) region of Türkiye

İhsangazi, formerly Mergüze, is a town in Kastamonu Province in the Black Sea region of Turkey. It is the seat of İhsangazi District. Its population is 2,891 (2021). The town lies at an elevation of 1,020 m (3,346 ft).
