= Bozkurt, Kastamonu =

Bozkurt
- Municipality
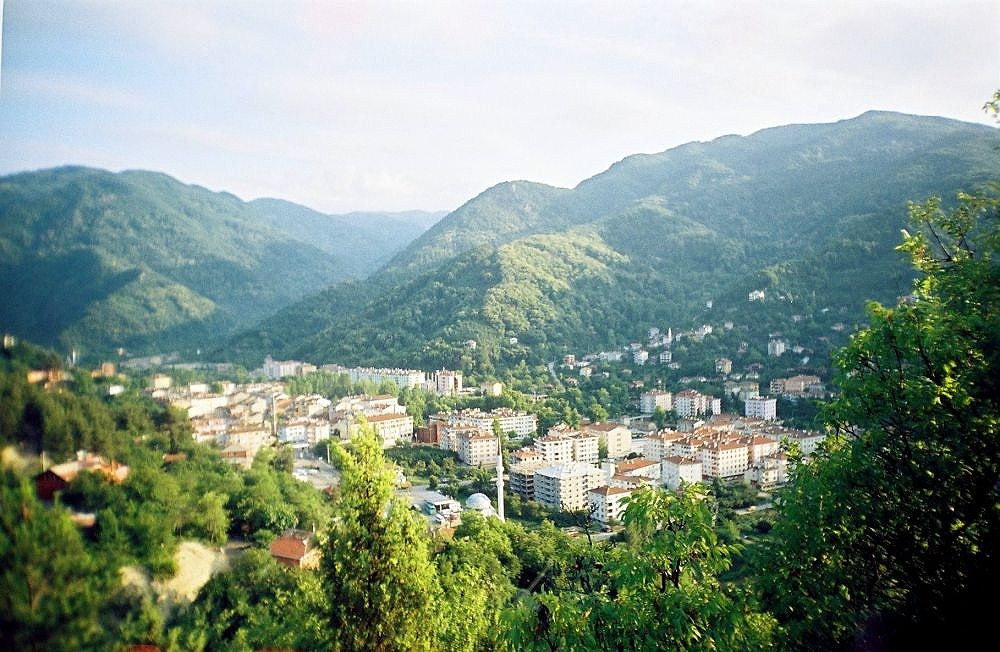
- A panorama of Bozkurt

- Coat of arms

- Location within Turkey
- Coordinates: 41°57′32″N 34°00′47″E
- Country: Turkey
- Province: Kastamonu
- District: Bozkurt

Government
  - Mayor: Muammer Yanık (AKP)
- Elevation: 252 m (827 ft)
- Population (2021): 5,329
- Time zone: UTC+3 (TRT)
- Area code: 0366
- Climate: Cfa
- Website: www.bozkurt.bel.tr

Bozkurt is a town in the Kastamonu Province in the Black Sea region of Turkey. It is the seat of Bozkurt District. Its population is 5,329 (2021). The town lies at an elevation of 252 m (827 ft).

== Image gallery ==
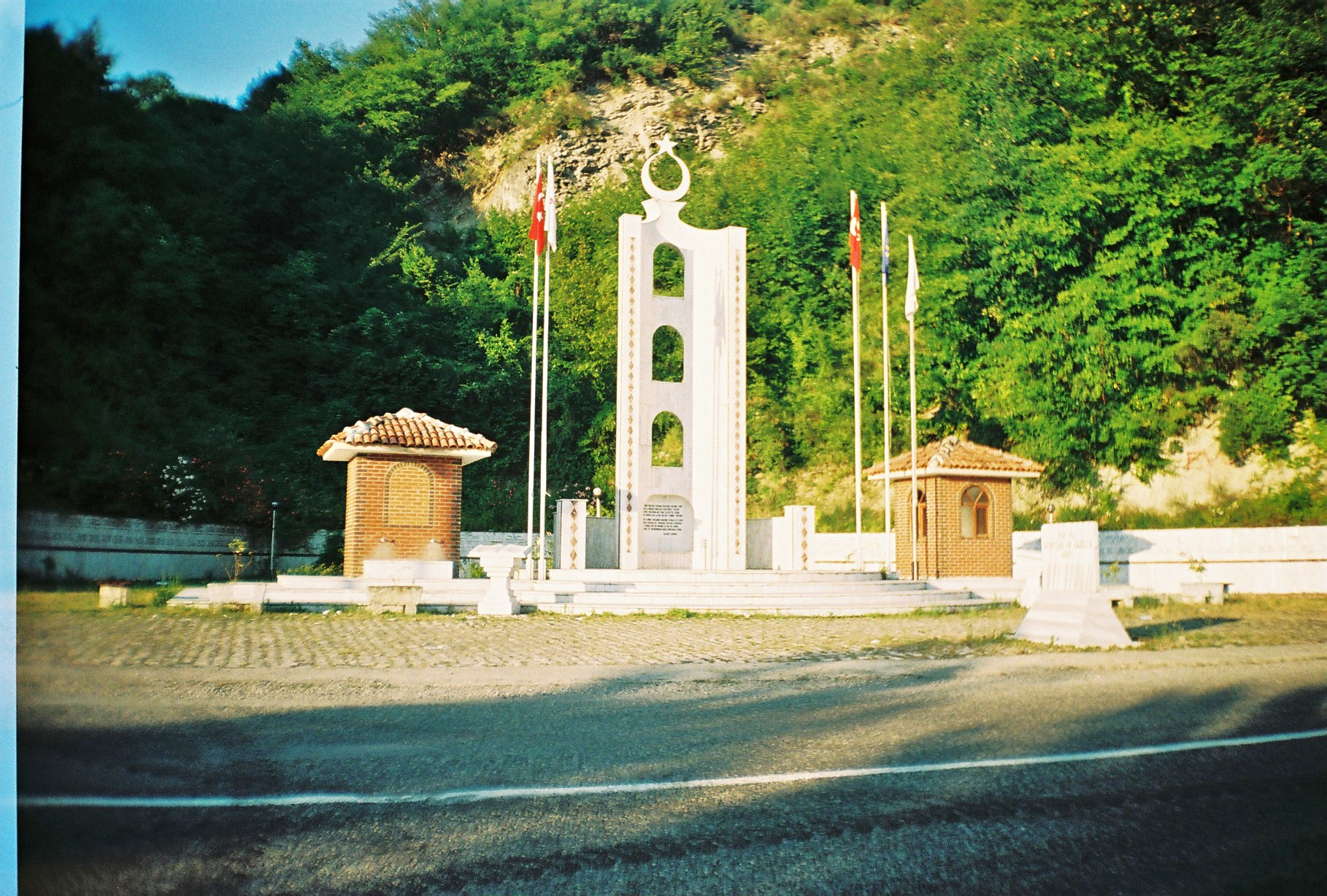
War memorial and cemetery

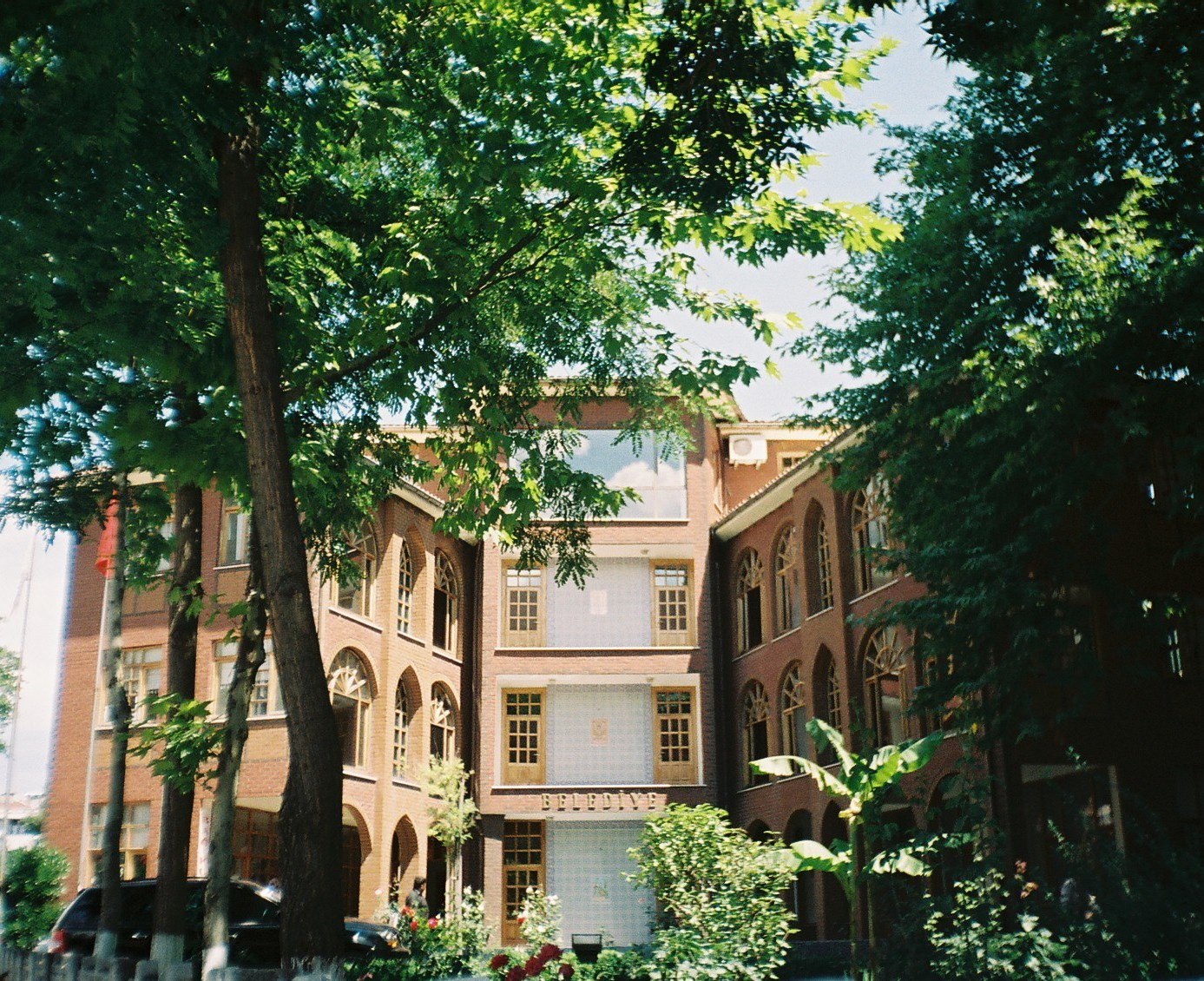
Municipality building
