= Çatalzeytin =

- Municipality
- Location within Turkey
- Coordinates: 41°57′9″N 34°12′54″E
- Country: Turkey
- Province: Kastamonu
- District: Çatalzeytin

Government
  - Mayor: Ahmet Demir (MHP)
- Elevation: 74 m (243 ft)
- Population (2021): 3,200
- Time zone: UTC+3 (TRT)
- Area code: 0366
- Climate: Cfa
- Website: www.catalzeytin.bel.tr

Çatalzeytin is a town in the Kastamonu Province in the Black Sea region of Turkey. It is the seat of Çatalzeytin District. Its population is 3,200 (2021). The town lies at an elevation of 74 m (243 ft).
