= Şenpazar =

- Municipality
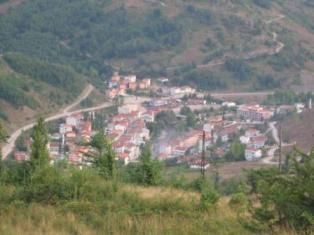
- A panorama of Şenpazar

- Location within Turkey
- Coordinates: 41°48′33″N 33°13′52″E
- Country: Turkey
- Province: Kastamonu
- District: Şenpazar

Government
  - Mayor: Cem Çınar (AKP)
- Elevation: 380 m (1,250 ft)
- Population (2021): 1,609
- Time zone: UTC+3 (TRT)
- Area code: 0366
- Climate: Cfb
- Website: www.senpazar.bel.tr

Şenpazar, formerly Şarbana, is a town in the Kastamonu Province in the Black Sea region of Turkey. It is the seat of Şenpazar District. Its population is 1,609 (2021).
