= Seydiler =

- Municipality
- Location within Turkey
- Coordinates: 41°37′08″N 33°43′08″E
- Country: Turkey
- Province: Kastamonu
- District: Seydiler

Government
  - Mayor: Mehmet Erdoğan (MHP)
- Elevation: 1,064 m (3,491 ft)
- Population (2021): 2,851
- Time zone: UTC+3 (TRT)
- Area code: 0366
- Climate: Cfb
- Website: www.seydiler.bel.tr

Seydiler is a town in the Kastamonu Province in the Black Sea region of Turkey. It is the seat of Seydiler District. Its population is 2,851 (2021). The town lies at an elevation of 1,064 m (3,491 ft).
