= Şenpazar District =

District of Kastamonu Province, Turkey

- District
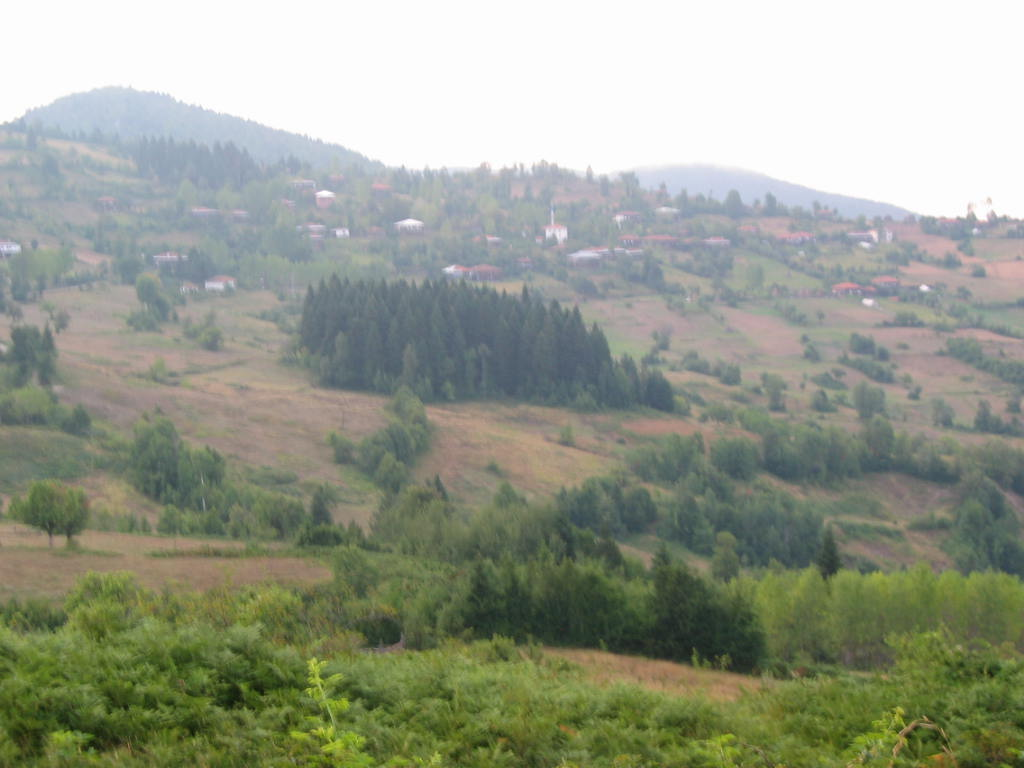
- Alancık village

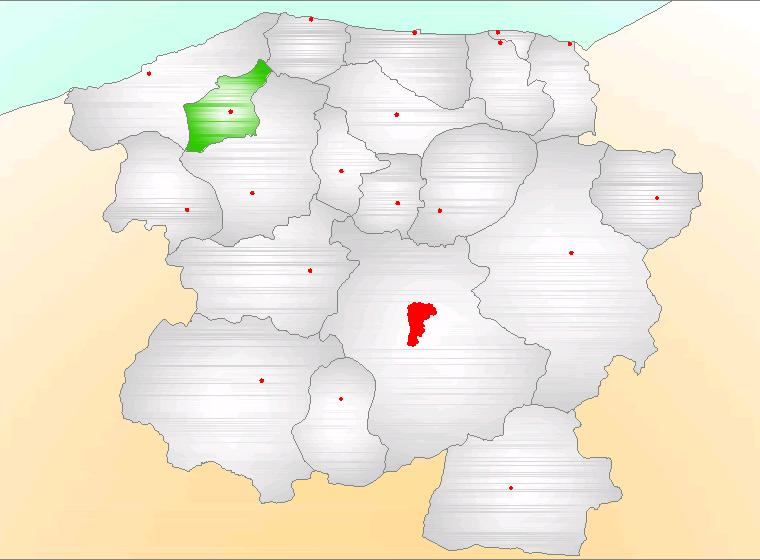
- Map showing Şenpazar District (green) in Kastamonu Province

- Location within Turkey
- Coordinates: 41°48′N 33°16′E
- Country: Turkey
- Province: Kastamonu
- Seat: Şenpazar

Government
  - Kaymakam: Emre Kazanasmaz
- Area: 252 km^{2} (97 sq mi)
- Population (2021): 4,304
  - Density: 17.1/km^{2} (44.2/sq mi)
- Time zone: UTC+3 (TRT)
- Website: www.senpazar.gov.tr

Şenpazar District is a district of the Kastamonu Province of Turkey. Its seat is the town of Şenpazar. Its area is 252 km^{2}, and its population is 4,304 (2021).

== Composition ==
There is one municipality in Şenpazar District:

- Şenpazar

There are 23 villages in Şenpazar District:

- Alancık
- Aşıklı
- Aybasan
- Başçavuş
- Büyükmutlu
- Celalli
- Dağlı
- Demirkaya
- Dereköy
- Dördül
- Edeler
- Fırıncık
- Gürleyik
- Gürpelit
- Harmangeriş
- Himmetköy
- Kalaycı
- Küçükmutlu
- Salman
- Seferköy
- Tepecik
- Uzunyol
- Yarımca
