= Bozkurt District, Kastamonu =

District of Kastamonu Province, Turkey

Bozkurt District
- District
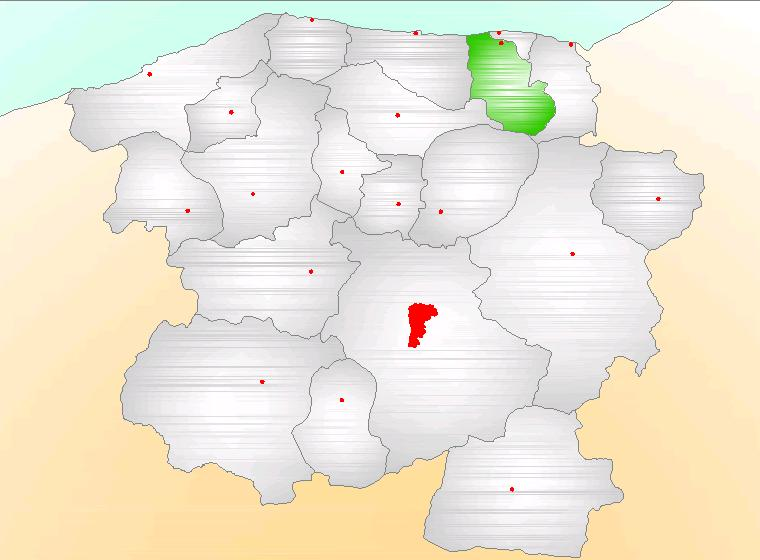
- Map showing Bozkurt District (green) in Kastamonu Province

- Location in Turkey
- Coordinates: 41°56′N 34°02′E
- Country: Turkey
- Province: Kastamonu
- Seat: Bozkurt

Government
  - Kaymakam: Murat Atıcı
- Area: 308 km^{2} (119 sq mi)
- Population (2021): 9,170
  - Density: 30/km^{2} (77/sq mi)
- Time zone: UTC+3 (TRT)
- Website: www.bozkurt.gov.tr

Bozkurt District is a district of the Kastamonu Province of Turkey. Its seat is the town of Bozkurt. Its area is 308 km^{2}, and its population is 9,170 (2021).

== Composition ==
There is one municipality in Bozkurt District:

- Bozkurt

There are 32 villages in Bozkurt District:

- Alantepe
- Ambarcılar
- Bayramgazi
- Beldeğirmen
- Çiçekyayla
- Darsu
- Dursun
- Görentaş
- Güngören
- Günvakti
- İbrahimköy
- İlişi
- İnceyazı
- Işığan
- Kayalar
- Kestanesökü
- Keşlik
- Kızılcaelma
- Kirazsökü
- Kocaçam
- Koşmapınar
- Köseali
- Kutluca
- Mamatlar
- Ortasökü
- Sakızcılar
- Sarıçiçek
- Şeyhoğlu
- Tezcan
- Uluköy
- Yaşarlı
- Yaylatepe
