= Ilgaz Mountains =

Mountain range in Turkey

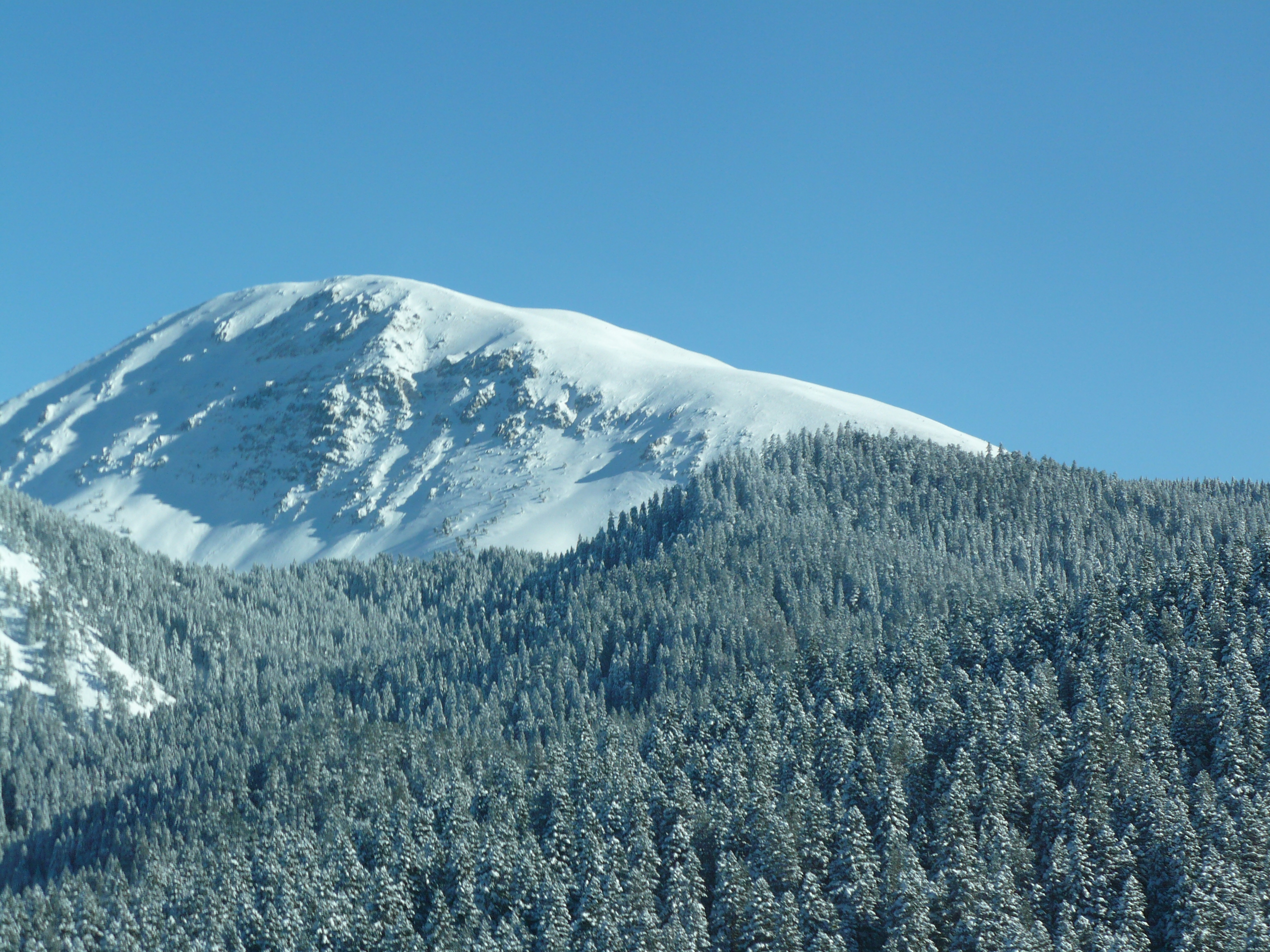
- Küçükhacet Tepe (2546 m)

Highest point
- Elevation: 2,587 m (8,488 ft)
- Parent peak: Büyükhacet Tepe (2587 m)
- Coordinates: 41.1°N 33.866667°E

Naming
- Native name: Ilgaz Dağları (Turkish)

Geography
- Location: Paphlagonia, Anatolia, Turkey
- Parent range: Pontic Mountains

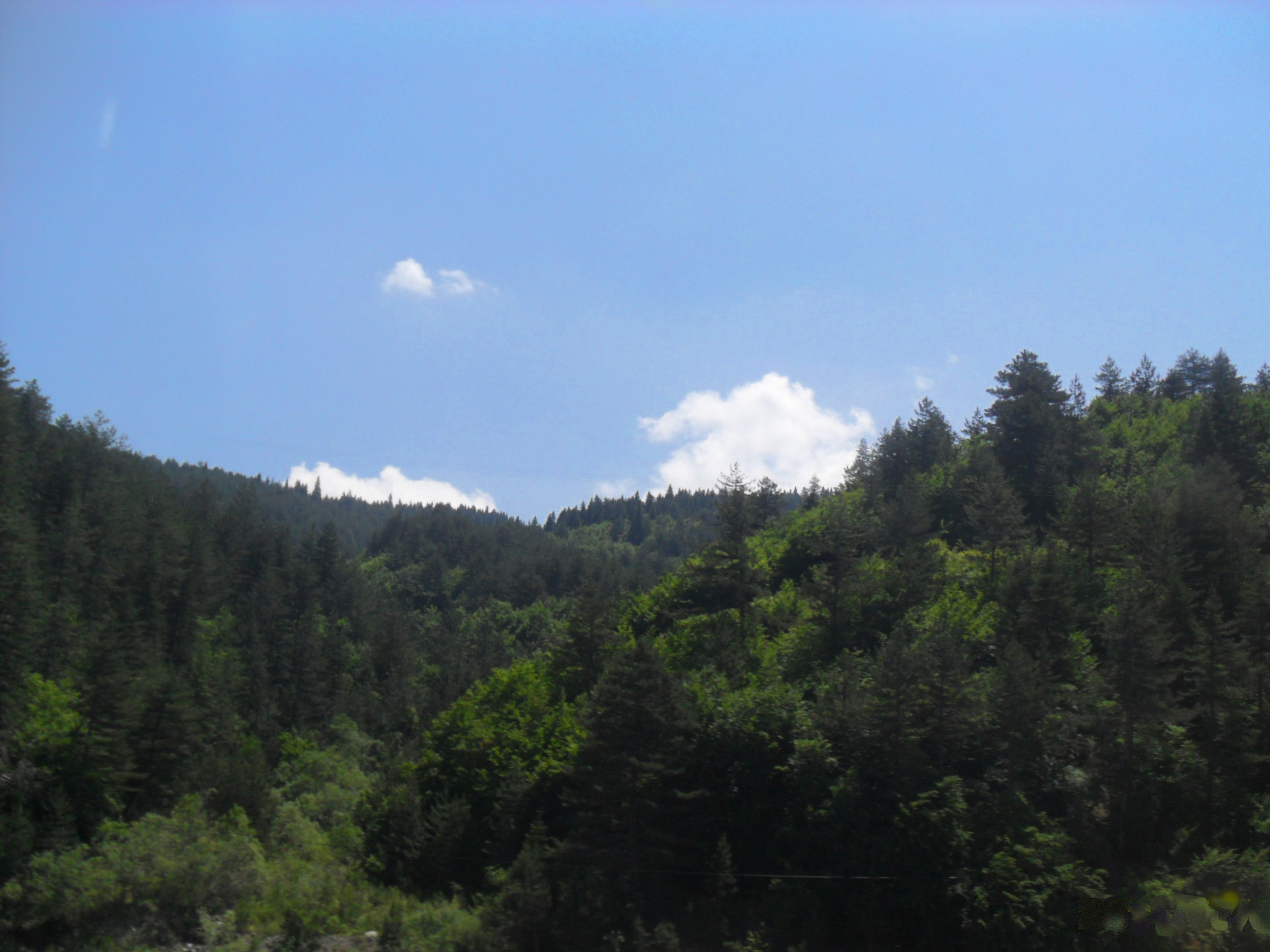
Sea of Trees

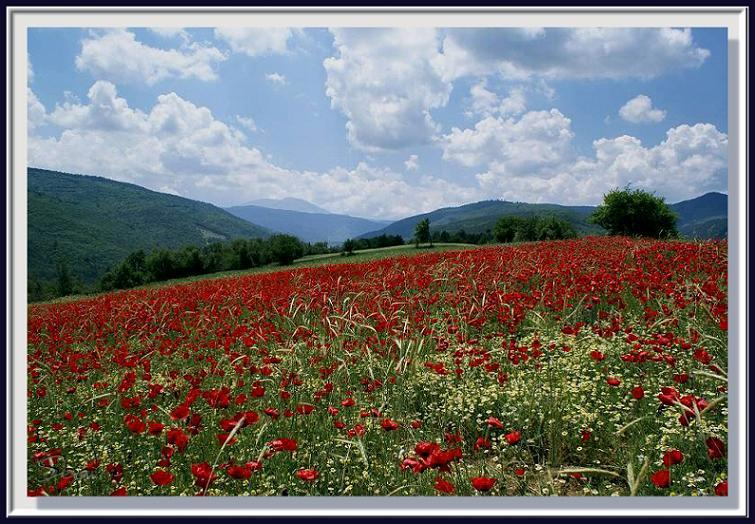
Poppy fields on the southern slopes

Ilgaz Mountains (Turkish: Ilgaz Dağları; Ancient Greek: Ὄλγασσυς, romanized: Olgassys) is a mountain range in northwest Anatolia, Turkey. It belongs to the Pontic Mountains system.

== Geography ==
In west Black Sea region, there are three ranges of mountains, which run parallel to the Black Sea coast. Ilgaz Mountains constitute the eastern part of the second range from the coast line at an average distance of 100 km (62 mi). The northern slopes of the mountains are in Kastamonu Province and the southern slopes are in Çankırı Province. The length of the mountain system from west to east is about 150 km (93 mi) with a width of about 30 km (19 mi). Situated at 41°06′N 33°52′E, the mountain peak, known as Büyükhacet Tepe, is 2,587 m (8,488 ft) high. The state highway D.765, which connects Black Sea coast to Central Anatolia is 10 km (6.2 mi) west of the peak. The altitude of the highest pass on the highway is 1,850 m (6,070 ft).

== History ==
The ancient Greeks and Romans generally knew the mountains as Olgassys. It was considered a lofty and inaccessible mountain on the frontiers of ancient Paphlagonia and Galatia, extending from the Halys River (Kızılırmak) in a southwestern direction towards the Sangarius, and containing the sources of the Parthenius River. The surrounding country was filled with temples erected by the Paphlagonians. The mountain mentioned by Ptolemy under the name of Ligas, Gigas, or Oligas, is probably the same as the Olgassys of Strabo. William Smith considered the current name a corruption of the former name.

== National park ==
The Mount Ilgaz National Park (Turkish: Ilgaz Dağı Milli Parkı) at the west of the highway pass was opened on June 2, 1976 and is easily accessible from the highway D.765. Total area of the park is 1,088 ha (10.88 km^{2}). At the highest elevation of the park, there are a number of hotels servicing to skiers. The skiers may use a 1,500 m (4,900 ft) long chairlift to the ski area. The distance from Ankara is 200 km (120 mi), which makes the park nearest winter sports resort to the capital city citizens. During the summertime, the visitors may fish in the Baldıran Valley within the national park.

== Ecology ==
Ilgaz Mountains, especially the northern slopes, are covered with dense forestry. The popular name of the forestry around Ilgaz Mountains is "sea of trees" (Turkish: ağaç denizi). Some of the wild animals living in the wooded ranges are red deer, roe deer, fallow deer, wild boar, brown bear, gray wolf, European jackal, chamois and red fox. In 1996, a new insect species was discovered in Ilgaz Mountain ecology and in 2010 it was named as Merodon Ilgazense.

== In popular music ==
The theme of a popular song "Ilgaz" composed by Ahmet Samim Bilgen and lyrics by Cemil Türkarman is about Ilgaz Mountains.
