= Çatalzeytin District =

District of Kastamonu Province, Turkey

- District
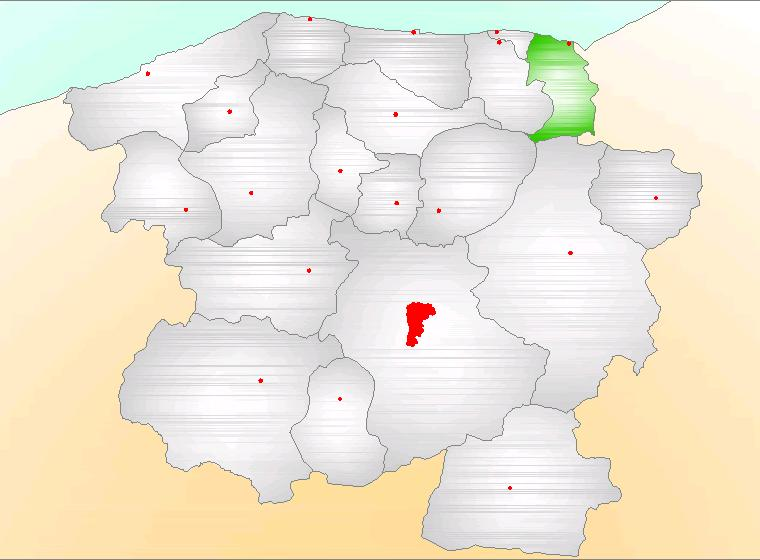
- Map showing Çatalzeytin District (green) in Kastamonu Province

- Location in Turkey
- Coordinates: 41°57′N 34°13′E
- Country: Turkey
- Province: Kastamonu
- Seat: Çatalzeytin

Government
  - Kaymakam: Mubin Demirkıran
- Area: 272 km^{2} (105 sq mi)
- Population (2021): 7,229
  - Density: 27/km^{2} (69/sq mi)
- Time zone: UTC+3 (TRT)
- Website: www.catalzeytin.gov.tr

Çatalzeytin District is a district of the Kastamonu Province of Turkey. Its seat is the town of Çatalzeytin. Its area is 272 km^{2}, and its population is 7,229 (2021).

== Composition ==
There is one municipality in Çatalzeytin District:

- Çatalzeytin

There are 41 villages in Çatalzeytin District:

- Arıca
- Aşağısökü
- Canlar
- Celaller
- Çağlar
- Çatak
- Çepni
- Çubuklu
- Dağköy
- Doğanköy
- Duran
- Epçeler
- Fındıklı
- Güneşler
- Hacıreis
- Hacıreissökü
- Hamidiye
- İsmailköy
- Karacakaya
- Kaşlıca
- Kavaklı
- Kavakören
- Kayadibi
- Kaymazlar
- Kızılcakaya
- Kirazlı
- Konaklı
- Kozsökü
- Köklüce
- Kuğuköy
- Kulfallar
- Paşalı
- Piri
- Samancı
- Saraçlar
- Sırakonak
- Sökü
- Yemişli
- Yenibeyler
- Yukarısökü
- Yunuslar
