= İhsangazi District =

District of Kastamonu Province, Turkey

- District
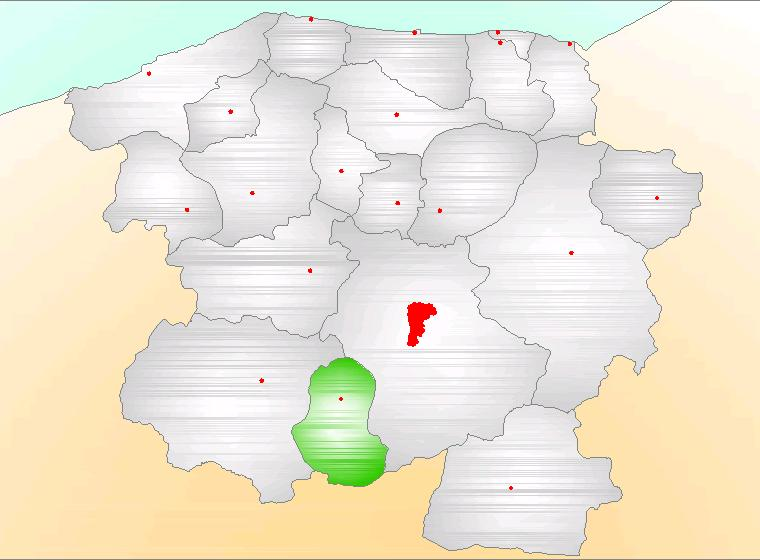
- Map showing İhsangazi District (green) in Kastamonu Province

- Location in Turkey
- Coordinates: 41°11′N 33°33′E
- Country: Turkey
- Province: Kastamonu
- Seat: İhsangazi

Government
  - Kaymakam: Taha Genç
- Area: 445 km^{2} (172 sq mi)
- Population (2021): 5,292
  - Density: 11.9/km^{2} (30.8/sq mi)
- Time zone: UTC+3 (TRT)
- Website: www.ihsangazi.gov.tr

İhsangazi District is a district of the Kastamonu Province of Turkey. Its seat is the town of İhsangazi. Its area is 445 km^{2}, and its population is 5,292 (2021).

== Composition ==
There is one municipality in İhsangazi District:

- İhsangazi

There are 23 villages in İhsangazi District:

- Akkaya
- Akkirpi
- Bedirgeriş
- Belençal
- Bozarmut
- Çatalyazı
- Çiçekpınar
- Dağyolu
- Embiya
- Görpe
- Haydarlar
- Hocahacip
- İnciğez
- Kapaklı
- Kayapınar
- Kızıleller
- Koçcuğaz
- Obruk
- Örencik
- Sarıpınar
- Sepetçioğlu
- Sünlük
- Yarışlar
