= Samim Bilgen =

Turkish lawyer and musician

- Born: Ahmet Samim; April 12, 1910; Thessaloniki, Salonica Vilayet, Ottoman Empire
- Died: September 9, 2005 (aged 95); Ankara, Turkey
- Education: Istanbul University; Harvard Law School
- Occupations: Lawyer, musician, composer
- Known for: Ilgaz
- Spouse: Hidayet Bilgen
- Children: Üstün Bilgen-Reinart, Gülsün Bilgen-Konuray (daughters), Semih Bilgen (son)
- Parent: Mehmet Emin Bilgen
- Relatives: Tarik Rona

Ahmet Samim Bilgen (April 12, 1910 Thessaloniki, Salonica Vilayet, Ottoman Empire – September 9, 2005 Ankara) was a Turkish lawyer, best known for his musical career as a violinist and composer. His song Ilgaz (lyrics also belong to him) has become a household tune in Turkey, and is popular even in China.

== Early life ==
Bilgen studied and practiced law professionally, but has also been an active musician, particularly in his youth.

After finishing Haydarpaşa German Primary School and Kabataş High School, he studied law at Istanbul University and graduated in 1931. In 1961–62, Bilgen studied international law at Harvard Law School in Cambridge, Massachusetts, USA.

Samim Bilgen served as a lawyer at State Forestry Administration and in later years as a legal advisor at the Ministry of Finance.

== Musical career ==
His musical life started in Istanbul during his high school years. He learned to play the piano from his mother, and trained himself in music theory as well as playing the violin. He attended Seyfeddin Asal's violin class in Istanbul Municipal Conservatory. While he was a law student, he started playing the violin professionally, first with Istanbul City Orchestra directed by the well known Turkish composer Hasan Ferit Alnar. Later, from 1930 to 1935, he played the first violin with Istanbul Conservatory Orchestra directed by Cemal Reşit Rey, also one of the top Turkish composers of the Republican era.

In 1933, Mustafa Kemal Atatürk, founder and President of the Turkish Republic, attended a performance of Bilgen's operetta Othello in Ankara, and expressed his admiration for the work. In 1935, two of his songs won prizes in a composition contest (organized by the daily newspaper Cumhuriyet, where Dmitri Shostakovich and Paul Hindemith were among the jury members. Professor Eugene Borrel of the Paris Conservatory heaped praise on Bilgen's collection entitled Turkish Folk Songs.

Throughout his life, he has endeavored to increase the popularity of polyphonic music in Turkey, and since 1973, he served on the consulting board of Sevda Cenap And Music Foundation.

== Works ==
=== Operettas and stage music ===
1. Kadinlar mi erkekler mi? ("Women or men?") operetta for piano, flute, clarinet, two violins and cello, 1932.
2. Bu yaz böyle geçti ("So passed this summer") operetta for orchestra, 1935.
3. Othello" Stage music for violin, cello, piano and strings, 1930.
4. Merihten gelen telsiz ("The wireless from Mars") stage music for violin, piano and cello, 1930.
5. Ilgaz stage music for strings, 1931.
6. Köye dönüs ("Return to the village") stage music for strings, 1932.

=== Music for voice and piano ===
1. Turkish folk airs, 1935.
2. Five folk songs, 1939.
3. Ten folk songs, 1960–1980.
4. Souvenirs, 1930–1935.
5. Nocturne for piano solo, 1980.
6. Ballade for piano solo, 1980.

== Published works ==
1. Souvenirs - Three piano pieces, Ilgaz, Return to the village, Women or men.
2. Two piano pieces, Nocturne, Ballade.
3. Turkish folk songs five folk songs.
4. Folk songs from yesterday to tomorrow five folk songs.
5. Marches four marches.
6. Two lieds Merdiven

His unpublished tango musics have been created in collaboration with his brother Tarık Rona (1914–1985).

=== Books ===
- Bilgen, Ahmet Samim. (1986), Dünden Yarına Türküler Çokseslendirilmiş On Halk Türküsü. Ankara, Eser Matbaacılık.
