= Mount Ilgaz National Park =

National park in Turkey

- Ilgaz Dağı Milli Parkı
- IUCN category II (national park)
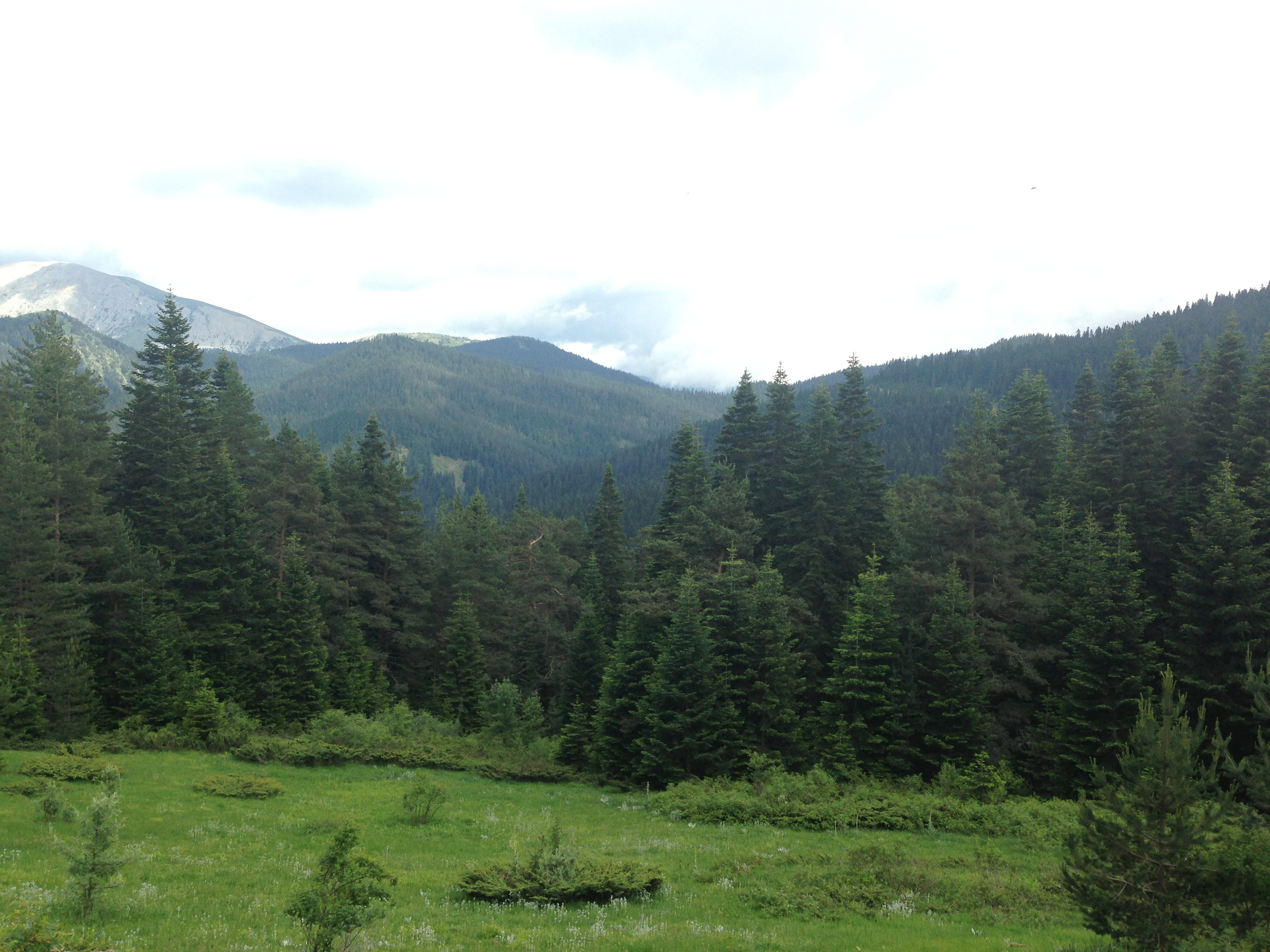
- A view from Mount Ilgaz

- Location within Turkey
- Location: Kastamonu Province-Çankırı Province, Turkey
- Nearest city: Kastamonu
- Coordinates: 41°04′24″N 33°48′25″E
- Area: 742.38 ha (1,834.5 acres)
- Established: June 2, 1976; 50 years ago
- Governing body: Directorate-General of Nature Protection and National Parks; Ministry of Environment and Forest

The Mount Ilgaz National Park (Turkish: Ilgaz Dağı Milli Parkı) is a protected area established on June 2, 1976 and located on the Ilgaz Mountains at the borderline between Kastamonu Province and Çankırı Province in the western Black Sea Region of Turkey. Natural resources and its potential for recreational activities are the main values of the national park, which stretches over an area of 742.38 ha (1,834.5 acres).

== Geology ==
The terrain structure of the Mount Ilgaz region, which is on the transient zone from Central Anatolia to North Anatolia, is characterized in general by serpentinite, schist and volcanic rock. There are also interesting examples in the region regarding mountain formation. Turkey's longest and most active geological fracture, the North Anatolian Fault, runs through the southern foot of Mount Ilgaz. The entire region features valleys, slopes and peaks of different characters. Additionally, it has geomorphological structure with a high-level landscape speciality.

== Geography ==
Geographical position of Gökırmak River and Devrez Creek around Ilgaz Mountains

The national park is on the Ilgaz Mountains, a mountain range in the western Black Sea Region. The mountains are bordered in the north by Gökırmak River and in the south by Devrez Creek, forming the hydrographic boundary between the two river basins. The Gökırmak River originates in the northern slopes of the Ilgaz Mountains, and flows in the west–east direction joining Kızılırmak River as one of its main tributaries. Devrez Creek follows the North Anatolian Fault joining also Kızılırmak in the east.

The highest peaks in the range are Büyükhacettepe at 2,587 m (8,488 ft), Küçükhacettepe at 2,546 m (8,353 ft), Çeþtepe at 2,394 m (7,854 ft) and Karataş Hill at 2,380 m (7,810 ft). The ridges of the Ilgaz Mountains stretch about 23 km (14 mi) in the west–east direction.

== Climate ==
Average annual temperature at the national park is 9.8 °C. January is the coldest month with an average temperature of −0.8 °C, while the warmest month is July with 20 °C followed by August with 19.7 °C. According to the meteorological station in Kastamonu, average annual rainfall is 486 mm (19.1 in). In the lower parts of the national park as in the valley floors, rainfall is about 400 mm (16 in) and at the mountain peaks, it is about 1,200 mm (47 in). Precipitation is highest in spring and early summer. The north facing slopes of the higher regions receive relative more rainfall. Central Anatolian climate causes snow over remains for about six months with snow thickness reaching about 1 m (3 ft 3 in) on slopes.

Climate data for Mount Ilgaz National Park
Month	Jan	Feb	Mar	Apr	May	Jun	Jul	Aug	Sep	Oct	Nov	Dec	Year
Daily mean °C (°F)	−0.8 (30.6)	0.7 (33.3)	4.3 (39.7)	9.5 (49.1)	14.1 (57.4)	17.4 (63.3)	20.0 (68.0)	19.7 (67.5)	15.5 (59.9)	10.6 (51.1)	5.2 (41.4)	1.2 (34.2)	9.8 (49.6)
Average precipitation mm (inches)	30.5 (1.20)	27.4 (1.08)	34.8 (1.37)	50.8 (2.00)	74.1 (2.92)	67.3 (2.65)	31.0 (1.22)	28.5 (1.12)	30.2 (1.19)	39.4 (1.55)	32.7 (1.29)	38.9 (1.53)	485.6 (19.12)
Source: Values of Annual Mean Temperature and Precipitation Distribution by Months (1930– 2010)

== Ecosystem ==
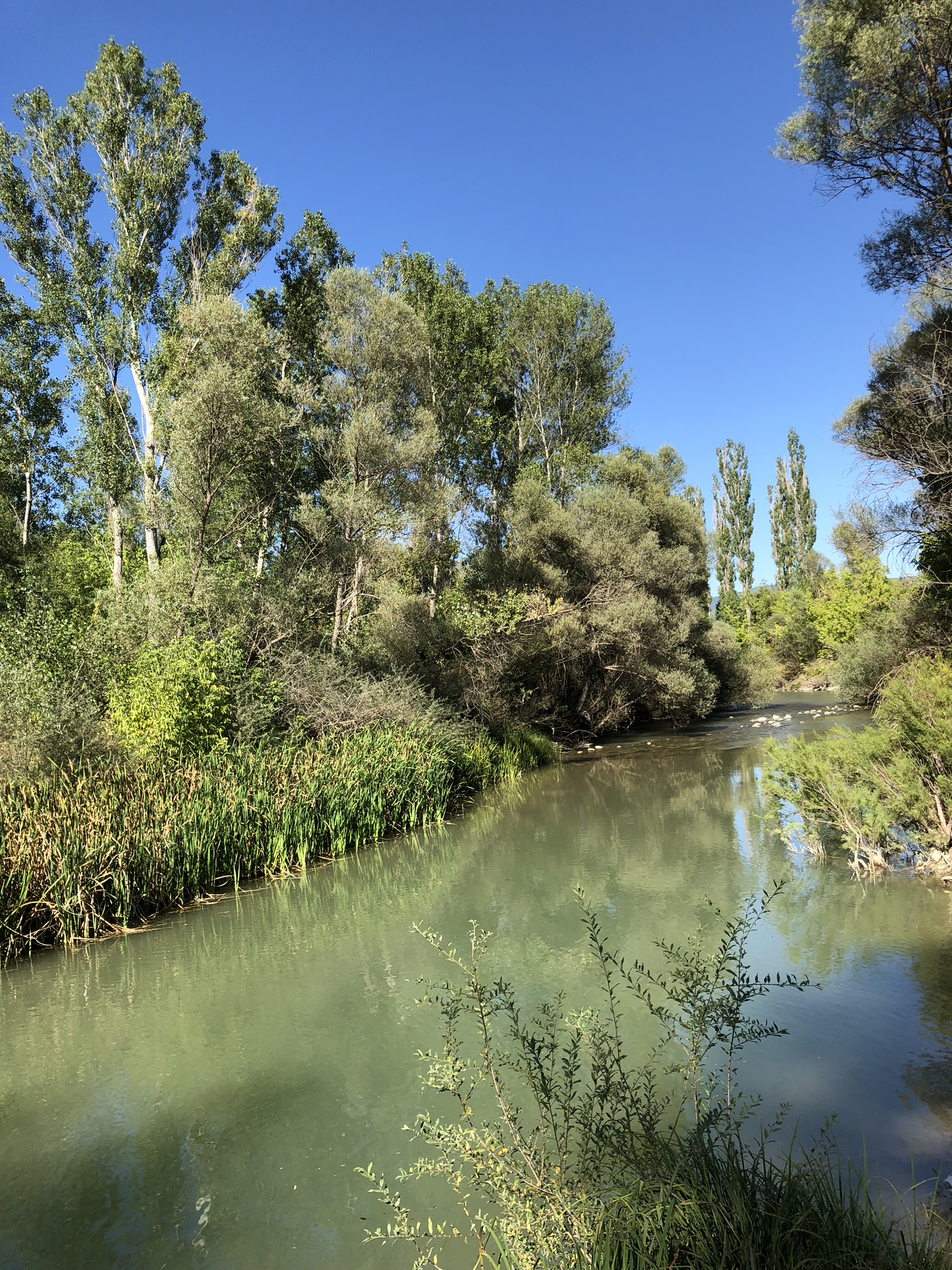
View of Mount Ilgaz National Park

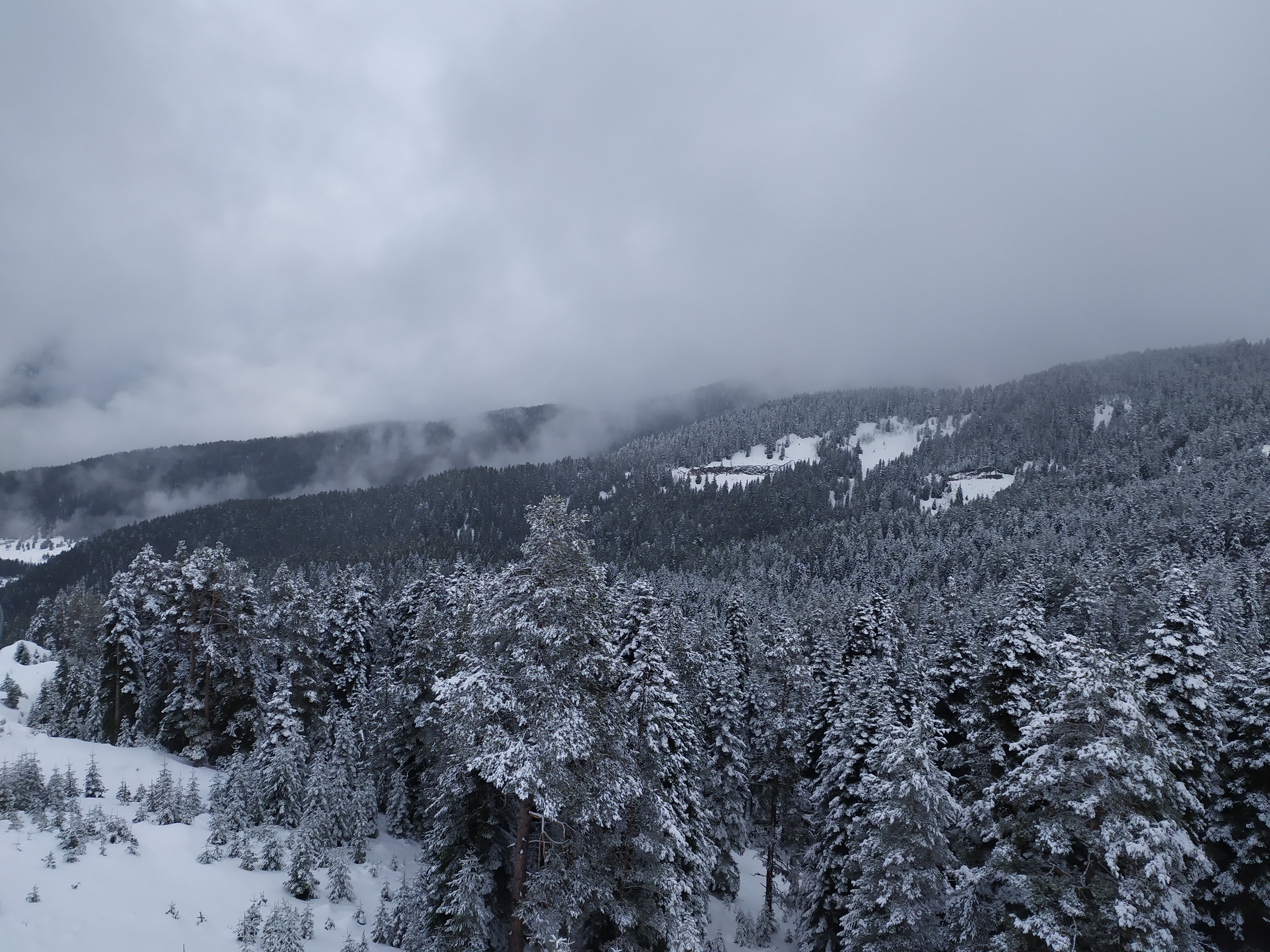
View of Mount Ilgaz National Park during winter

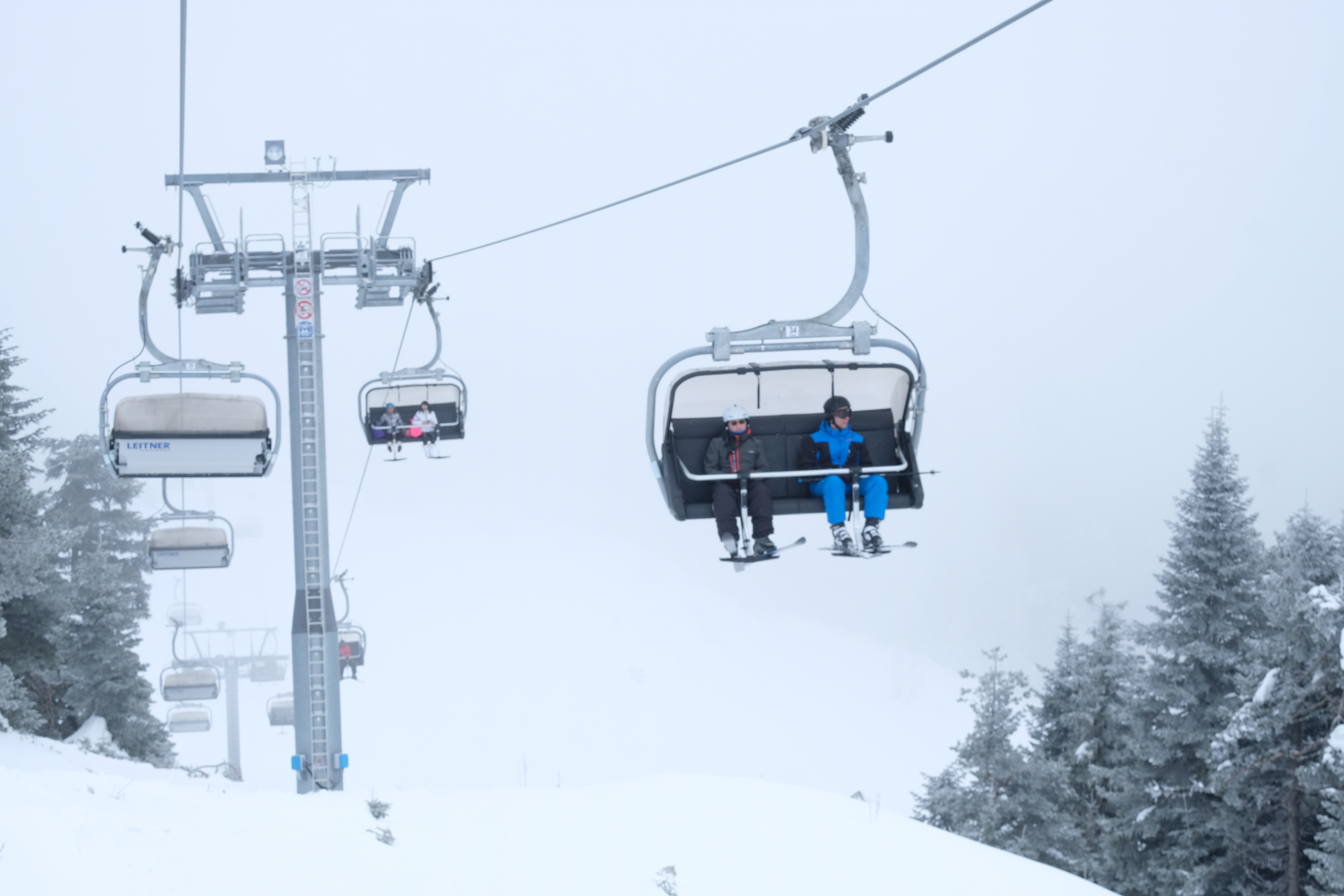
View of Mount Ilgaz National Park during winter

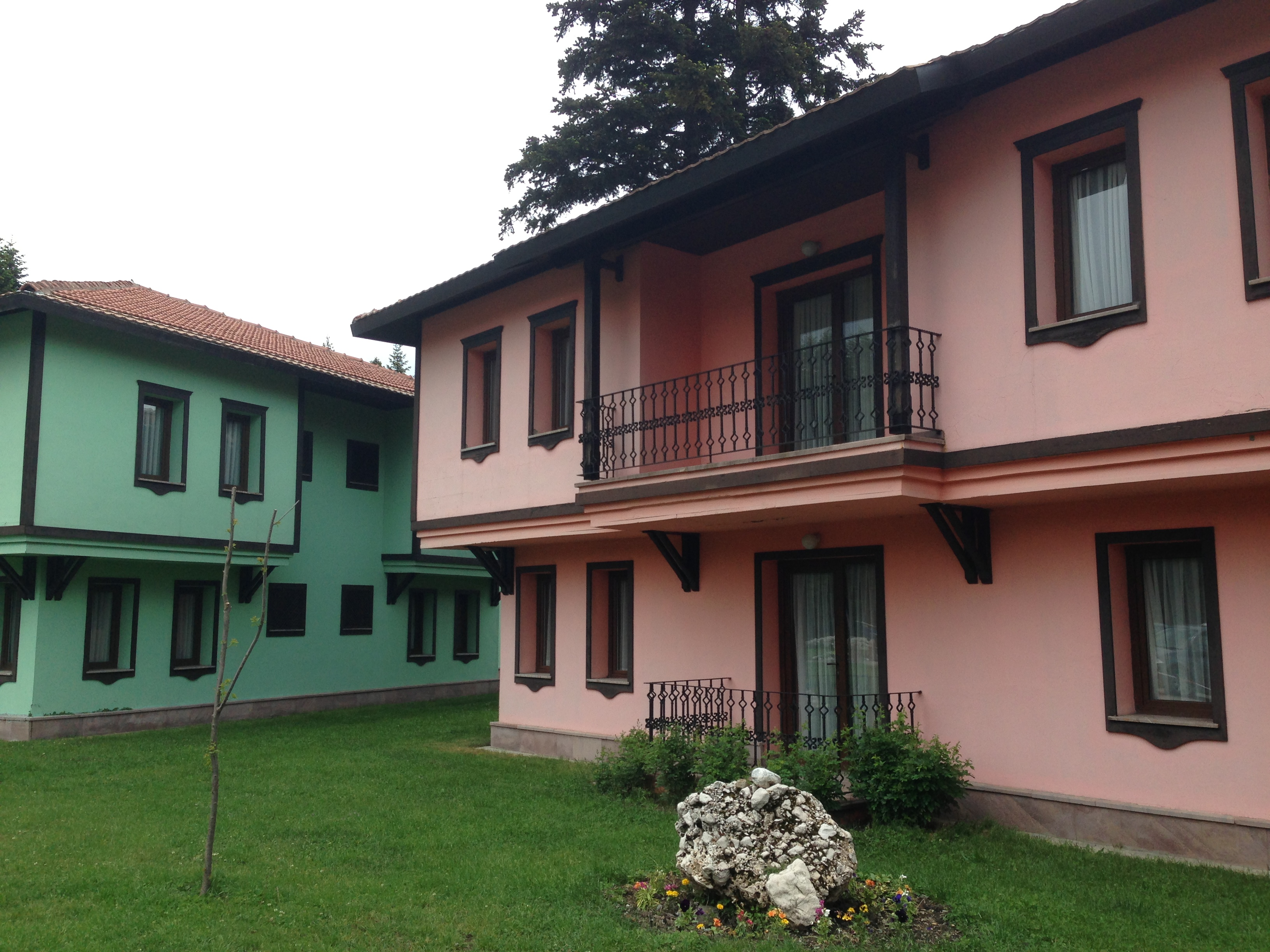
Residences of Mount Ilgaz National Park

Thanks to the location of the national park in the transient region between Central Anatolia and Black Sea Region, the national park has a rich ecosystem of flora and fauna.

Flora

Forests, covering 81.7% of the total area, are the main vegetation group found in the national park's flora formation consisting of forest, underwood and alpine flora in general. The low altitude parts of the northern slopes are generally covered with Turkey oak (Quercus cerris), European black pine (Pinus nigra) and fir (Abies) forests. At the altitudes of 1,000–1,300 m (3,300–4,300 ft), hornbeam (Carpinus) and beech (Fagus') become dominant accompanied with some other firewood and deciduous plants. At higher elevations, at 1,500 m (4,900 ft) and above, Turkish pine (Pinus brutia) and Scots pine (Pinus sylvestris) establish pure or mixed forests. This zone is rich of endemic flora found in northern Turkey. The alpine zone beginning up from 2,000–2,200 m (6,600–7,200 ft) is utmost rich consisting of rare and endemic vegetation formed by dwarf shrubs. On the summit of Küçükhacettepe and Büyükhacettepe, which is the highest peak, numerous rare and endemic taxa are found.

Fauna

It is believed that some 30 mammals are found in and around the Ilgaz Mountains. Abundant and all-year-long running streams as well as rich vegetation enable well-matched conditions for the habitat of fauna such as deer (Cervidae), roe deer (Capreolus capreolus), wild boar (Sus scrofa), grey wolf (Canis lupus), brown bear (Ursus arctos), red fox (Vulpes vulpes), wildcat (Felis silvestris), lynx, European pine marten (Martes martes), beech marten (Martes foina), weasel, rabbit, squirrel, hedgehog, mole, bat, European badger (Meles meles) and European otter (Lutra lutra). Studies showed the existence of 617 taxa in and around the national park.

== Recreation ==
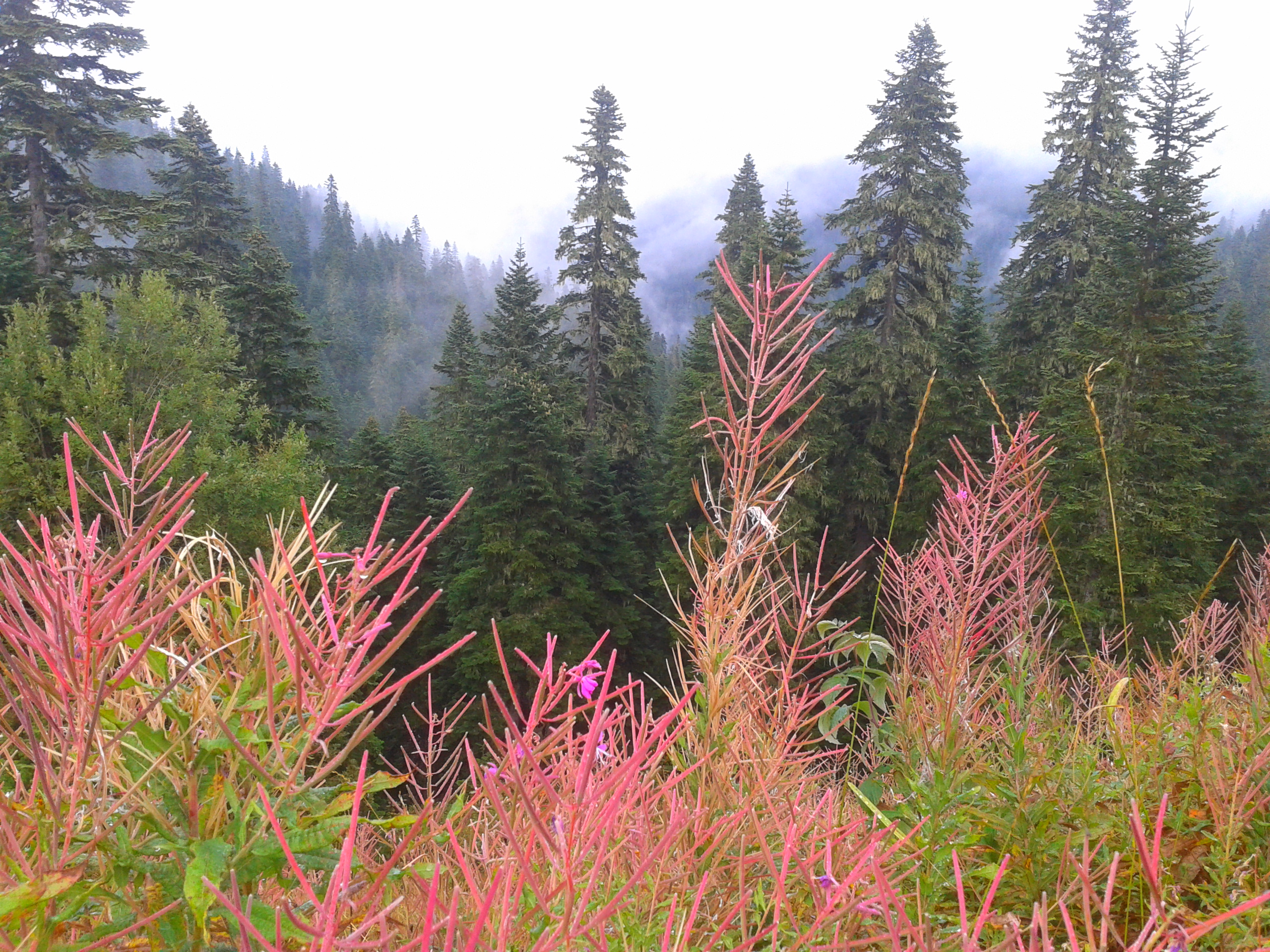
View of the mountains

Mount Ilgaz National Park offers opportunities for diverse outdoor sports including hiking, camping and caravaning as well as daily activities. Angling at fishponds situated on Karasu stream in Baldıran Valley is possible between June 15 and September 15. Visitors can also buy trout throughout the year from fish hatcheries in the same area.

Another important feature of the national park is its potential for winter sports, which is performed at the site since the 1990s. The ski resort attracts visitors from Istanbul and Ankara. The nearest ski resort to Ankara is situated in the national park, called "Ankara Konağı" ("Ankara Lodge"). The Ilgaz Ski Resort, established officially in 1997 containing the entire national park, has an 800-metre-long (2,600 ft) ski slope available, which is served by a chairlift and a surface lift, each 1,500 m (4,900 ft) long.

== Access ==
The national park is situated on the state road D.765 between Çankırı and Kastamonu, which runs from Ankara to Black Sea coast northwards. It is 450 km (280 mi) east of Istanbul and 200 km (120 mi) northeast of Ankara, and 45 km (28 mi) south of Kastamonu, where also an airport is available. The site is 25 km (16 mi) north of the town Ilgaz on the Istanbul-Samsun highway D.100 (European route E80).

The main entrance to the national park is near the mountain pass at 1,850 m (6,070 ft), which is the highest point of the highway D.765.

== Catering and lodging ==
To meet the catering and lodging needs of the visitors, the national park consists of a holiday village, social facilities and a hotel, all situated within Kastamonu Province side of the province borderline. In addition, there are accommodation facilities belonging to various public institutions. Ilgaz Mountain Resort offers 118 suites having 446 beds. The total lodging capacity at the national park is 666.
