= Seydiler District =

District of Kastamonu Province, Turkey

- District
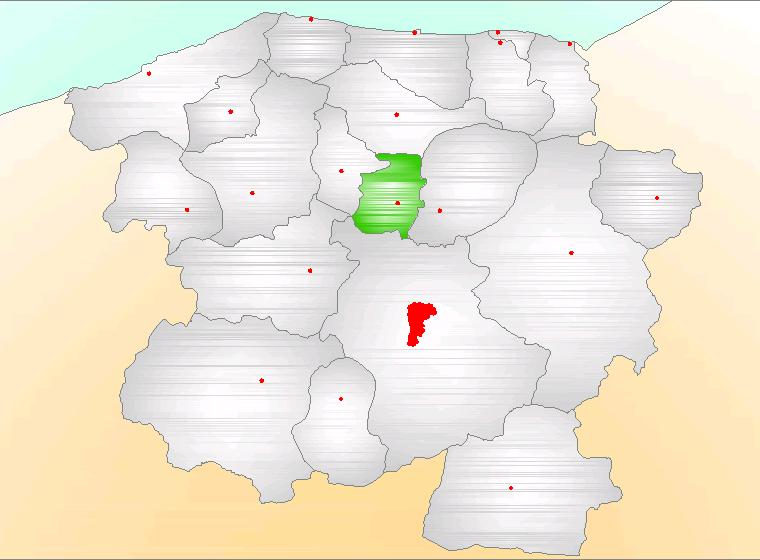
- Map showing Seydiler District (green) in Kastamonu Province

- Location in Turkey
- Coordinates: 41°37′N 33°45′E
- Country: Turkey
- Province: Kastamonu
- Seat: Seydiler

Government
  - Kaymakam: Cihat Abukan
- Area: 233 km^{2} (90 sq mi)
- Population (2021): 4,289
  - Density: 18.4/km^{2} (47.7/sq mi)
- Time zone: UTC+3 (TRT)
- Website: www.seydiler.gov.tr

Seydiler District is a district of the Kastamonu Province of Turkey. Its seat is the town of Seydiler. Its area is 233 km^{2}, and its population is 4,289 (2021).

== Composition ==
There is one municipality in Seydiler District:

- Seydiler

There are 15 villages in Seydiler District:

- Çerçiler
- Çiğilerik
- Çırdak
- Emreler
- Ericek
- Imrenler
- Incesu
- Karaçavuş
- Kepez
- Mancılık
- Odabaşı
- Sabuncular
- Şalgam
- Üyük
- Yolyaka
