= Kastamonu Province =

Province of Turkey

Coordinates: 41°31′10″N 33°41′23″E

Kastamonu Province Kastamonu ili
- Province
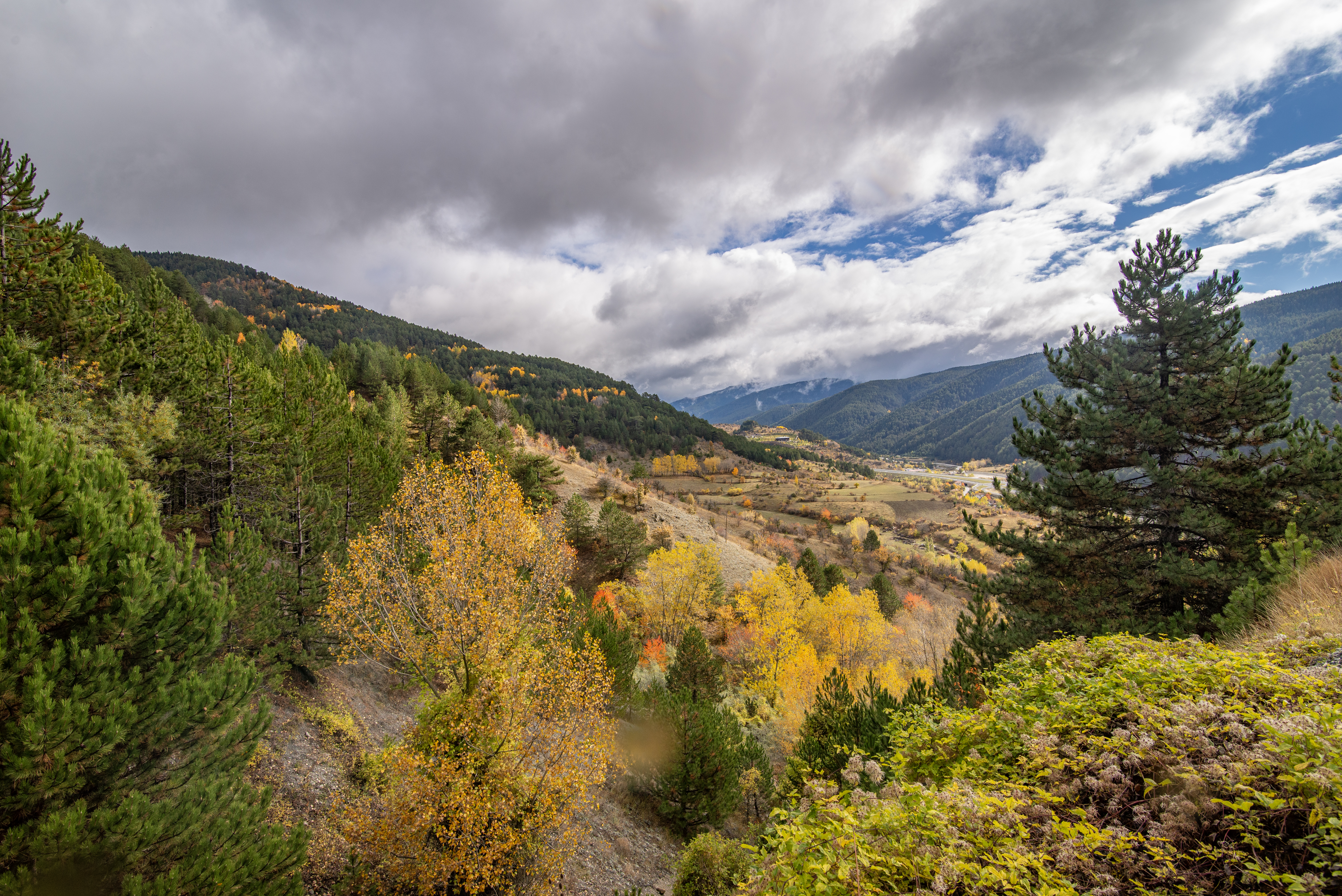
- Ilgaz Mountain National Park

- Location of the province within Turkey
- Country: Turkey
- Seat: Kastamonu

Government
  - Governor: Meftun Dallı
- Area: 13,064 km^{2} (5,044 sq mi)
- Population (2022): 378,115
  - Density: 28.943/km^{2} (74.963/sq mi)
- Time zone: UTC+3 (TRT)
- Area code: 0366
- Website: www.kastamonu.gov.tr

Kastamonu Province (Turkish: Kastamonu ili) is a province of Turkey, in the Black Sea region in the north of the country. It is surrounded by Sinop to the east, Bartın, Karabük to the west, Çankırı to the south, Çorum to the southeast and the Black Sea to the north. Its area is 13,064 km^{2}, and its population is 378,115 (2022). The population density is 29 inhabitants per km^{2}. The provincial capital Kastamonu has a population of 128,707 (2022).

== Districts ==
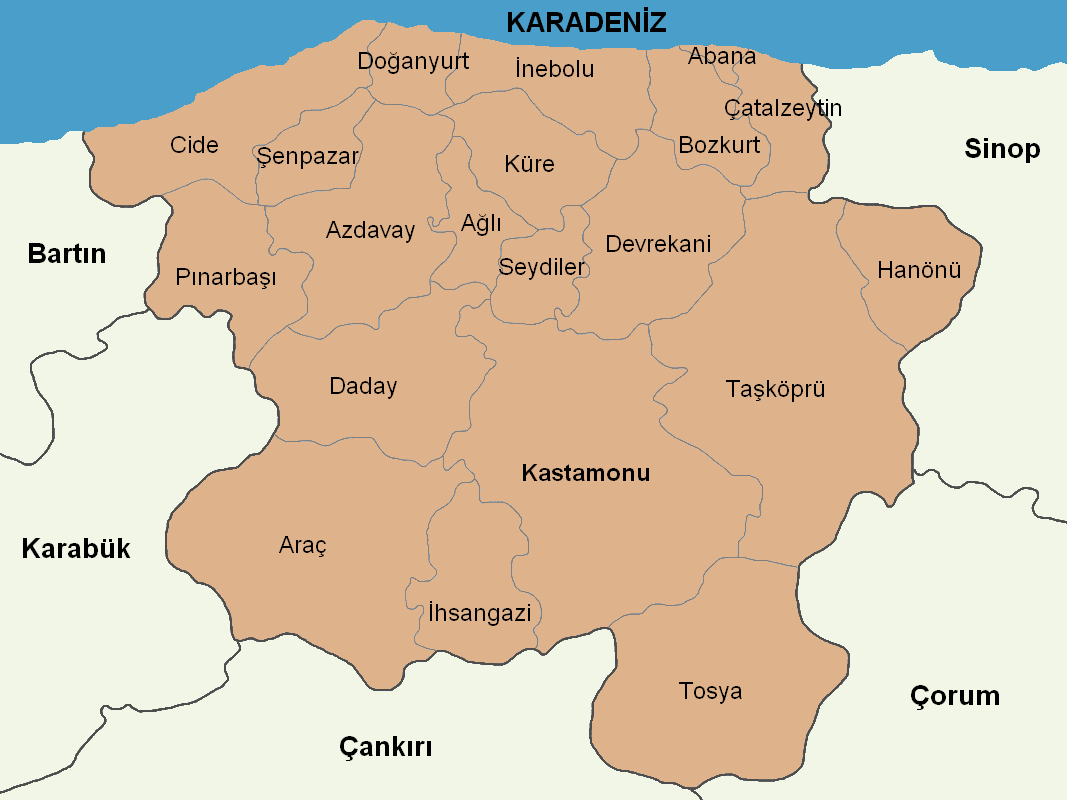

Kastamonu province is divided into 20 districts (capital district in bold):

- Abana
- Ağlı
- Araç
- Azdavay
- Bozkurt
- Çatalzeytin
- Cide
- Daday
- Devrekani
- Doğanyurt
- Hanönü
- İhsangazi
- İnebolu
- **Kastamonu**
- Küre
- Pınarbaşı
- Şenpazar
- Seydiler
- Taşköprü
- Tosya

== History ==
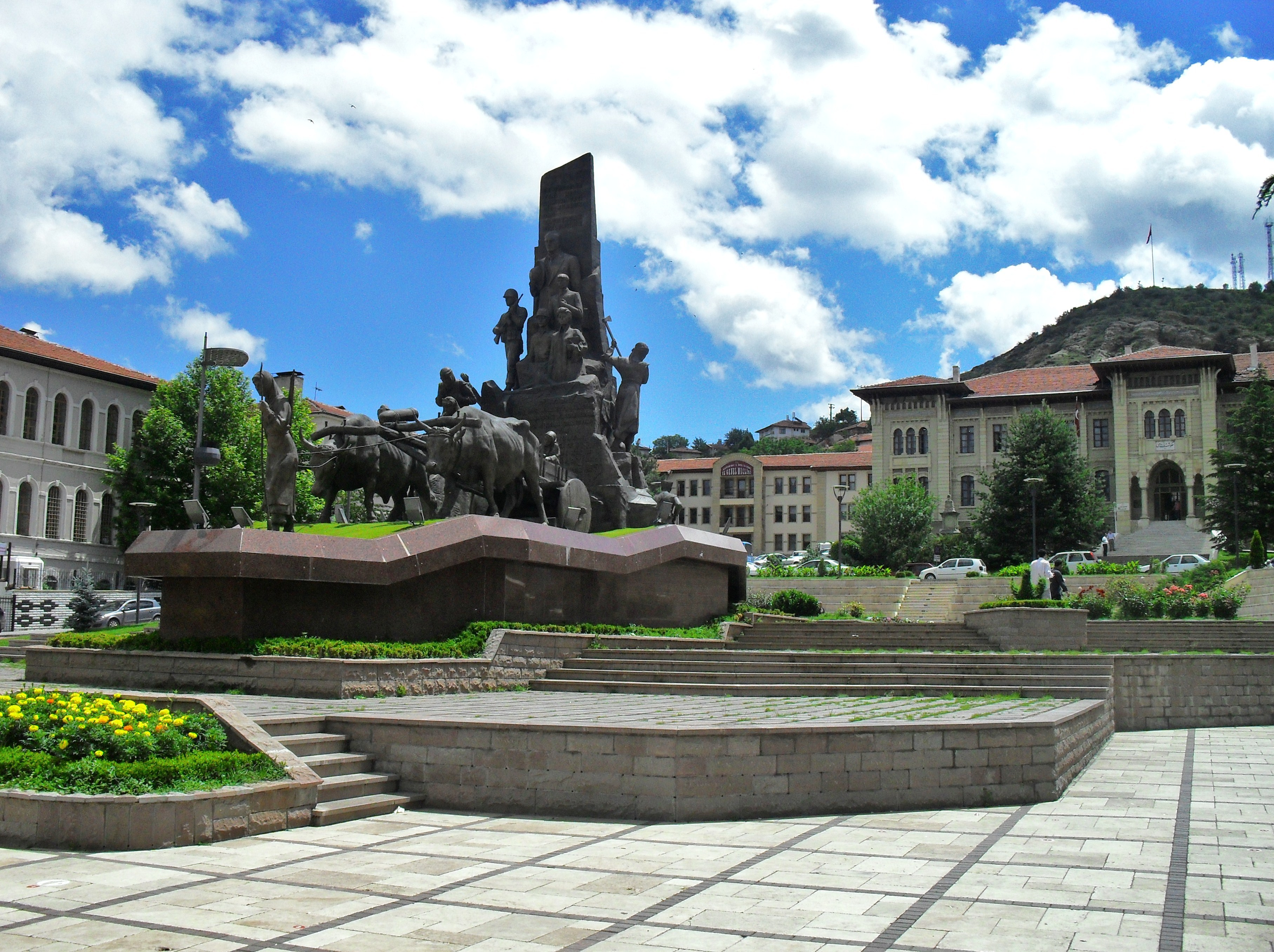
Kastamonu Republic Monument

It is not definitively known when Kastamonu was first founded. However, some sources dating back to the Early Middle Ages refer to the province. There are also some archeological findings that date to about 100,000 years that suggest the region was inhabited at that time.

There are many ideas about the derivation of the name Kastamonu:

According to the first view, it should be considered that the name Kastamonu is Turkishized from the name Paphlagonía[Greek "land of Paphlagon (people)"]. The region covering the West Black Sea and Central Black Sea regions was called Paphlagonia before the Turks. Today, Kastamonu, Sinop, Bartın, Çankırı and Karabük are located in this region, while parts of Çorum, Bolu, Zonguldak and Samsun provinces remain within the region. The Paphlagonians, who dominated this region in 1000 BC, gave their name to this geography.

According to a second opinion, the city of Kastamonu took its name from the name Kastama, which was used for the same region in the Hittite period. The name Kastama turned into Kastamonu over time.

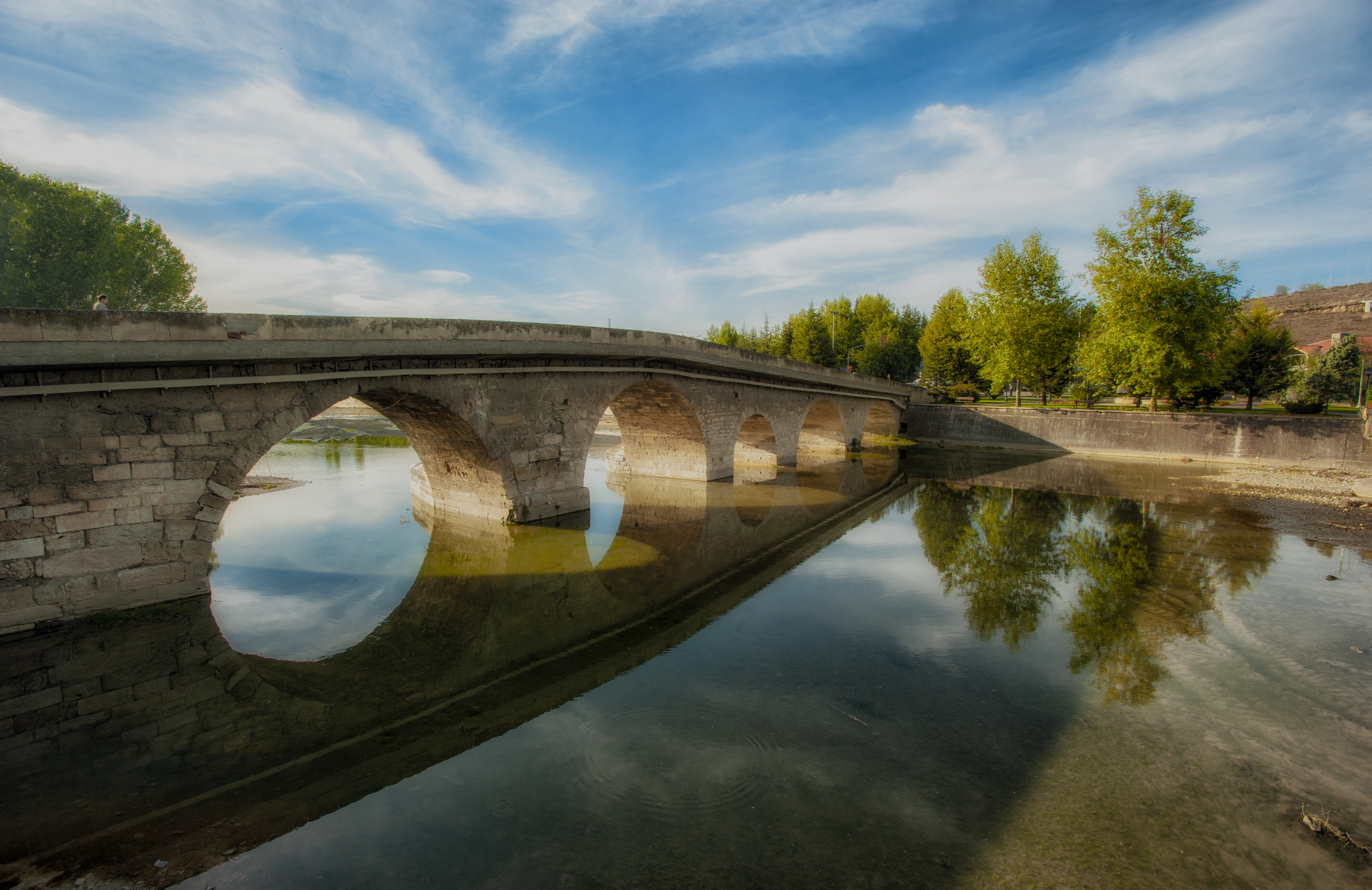
Taşköprü is a district of Kastamonu province. The Taşköprü district takes its name from the 68-meter-long Stone Bridge, which is estimated to have been built in pre-Roman times on Gökırmak and is still in use.

According to another view, the city of Kastamonu took its name from the combination of the words Gas and Tumanna. Gas, or better known as Kashkas, are among the first settlers of Kastamonu. Tumanna is the name of a city/region located on Kastamonu at that time. The combination of these two words took the form of Kastamonu over time.

According to a third opinion, the city of Kastamonu took its name from the combination of the words Kastra and Komnen. The word Kastra means "castle" in Latin. The Komnens are a Byzantine Dynasty and the settlers of this region during the Byzantine period. These two words took the form of Kastamonu over time.

With the weakening of the Macedon kings, the Paphlagonia and Bithynia regions were engulfed by the newly formed Pontus kingdom. After the fall of the Pontus kingdom in first century BC, the area was incorporated by the Roman Empire by joining Paphlagonia with Bithynia. The capital center of this new city-state was Pompeiopolis, of which the remains still stand near Tasköprü District in Kastamonu.

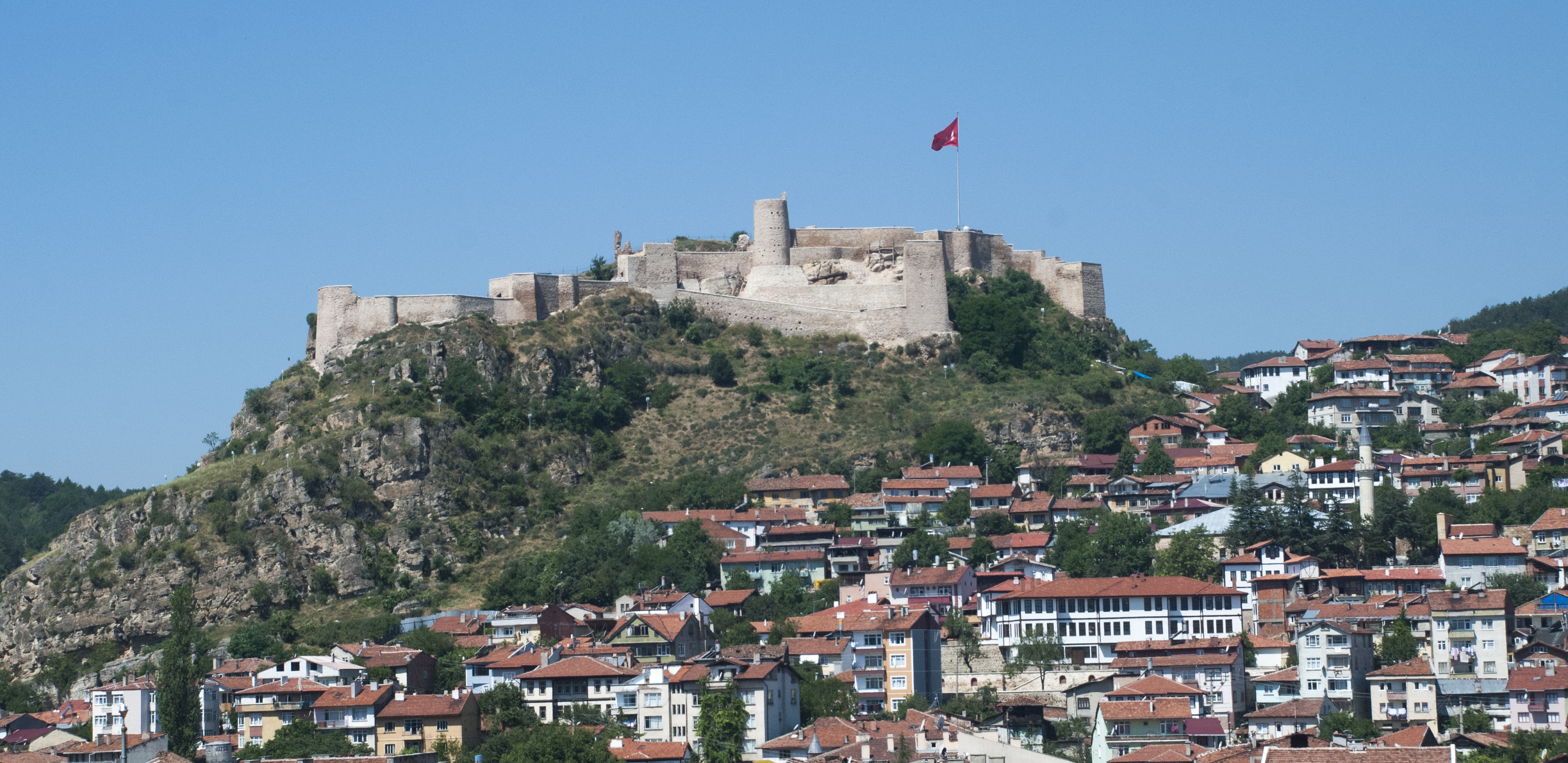
Kastamonu Castle

The region then fell under the hegemony of the Seljuq dynasty (11th century AD), followed by the Danishmends, the Byzantines during the crusades, Çobanoğlu and Jandarid beyliks. The Ottoman sultan Beyazid I conquered the province in 1392; however, following his capture and death in Battle of Ankara, the area was granted back to the Çandaroğlu by the Mongol warlord Timur Lenk. Ottoman sultan Mehmed II incorporated the region back into the empire in 1461.

During the Ottoman reign, the province boundaries were expanded up to reach Constantinople. The sultan's heirs were often sent to rule the province as governors to gain experience.

After the First World War, during the battles of the Turkish War of Independence, Kastamonu played an important role in the supply of ammunition and troops to the İnebolu–Ankara front, transporting the war machines that would arrive to İnebolu by sea from Istanbul (Constantinople) and the Soviets. When the Greeks noticed this activity, the İnebolu port was bombarded from the sea on 9 June 1921.

== Archaeology ==
In November 2026, archaeologists announced further discoveries at the ancient city of Pompeiopolis, located in the Taşköprü district. Excavations during the 2026 archaeological season revealed an extensive Roman mosaic inside a monumental basilica, together with a sculpted head of Eros. Pompeiopolis was an important urban centre in ancient Paphlagonia and served as the region's capital during the Roman Imperial period. The mosaic covers approximately 120–130 square metres and consists of geometric decorative compositions. It was uncovered across the central and eastern aisles of the basilica and dates to approximately the fourth century AD. The pavement is relatively well preserved, although some sections require conservation to stabilise damaged areas and secure individual tesserae.

== Geography ==
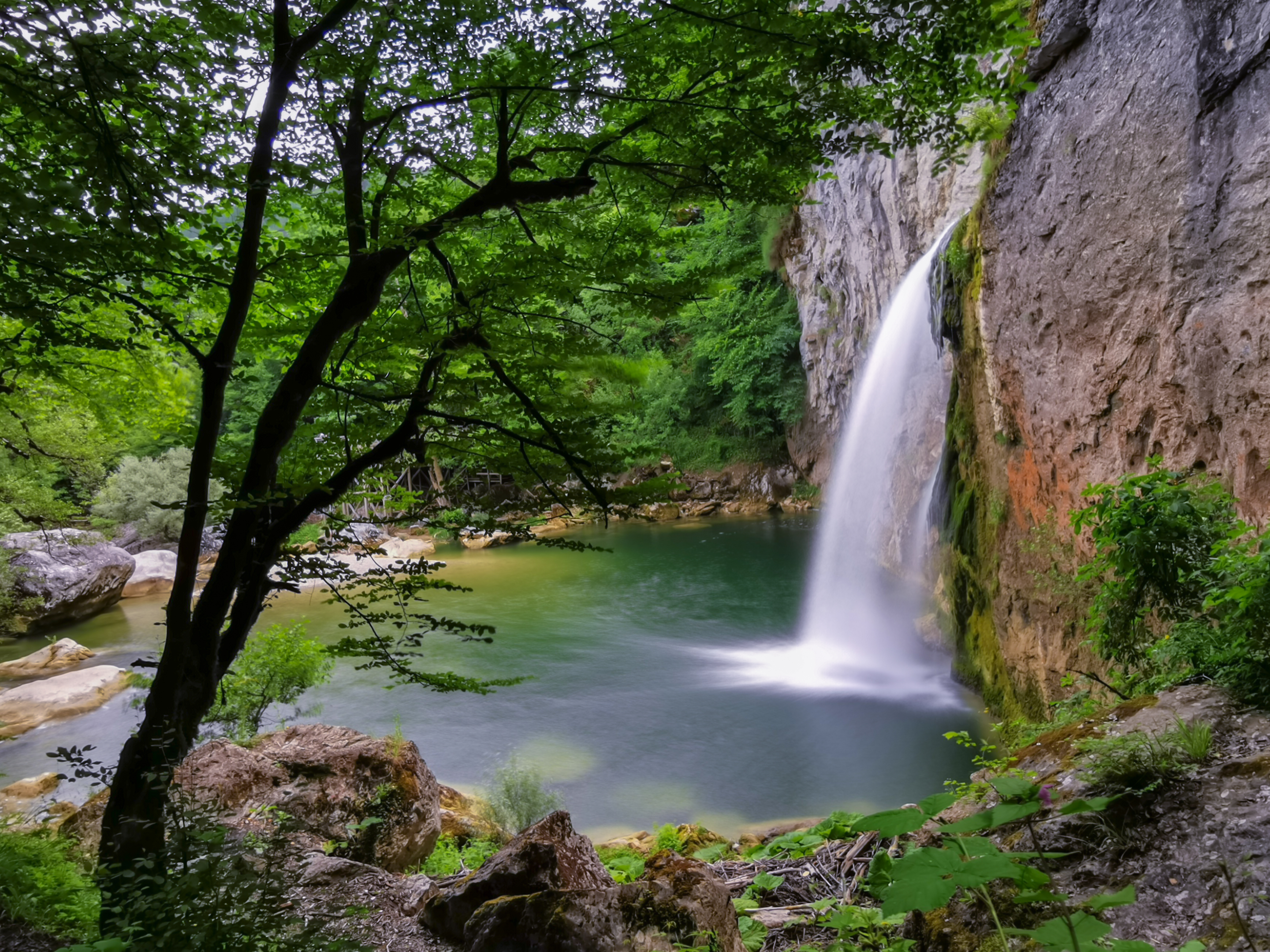
Ilısu Waterfall, at Küre national Park, near Pınarbaşı, Kastamonu, Turkey

The province is mostly covered with forests, thanks to the mild Black Sea climate. Ilgaz National Park, where a micro-climate dominates due to the mountainous terrain and numerous streams, is 63 km south of the province center of Kastamonu.

Ilgaz Mountain (highest peak 2587 m) dominates the south of the province where hiking and whitewater rafting is possible at the Ilgaz Stream.

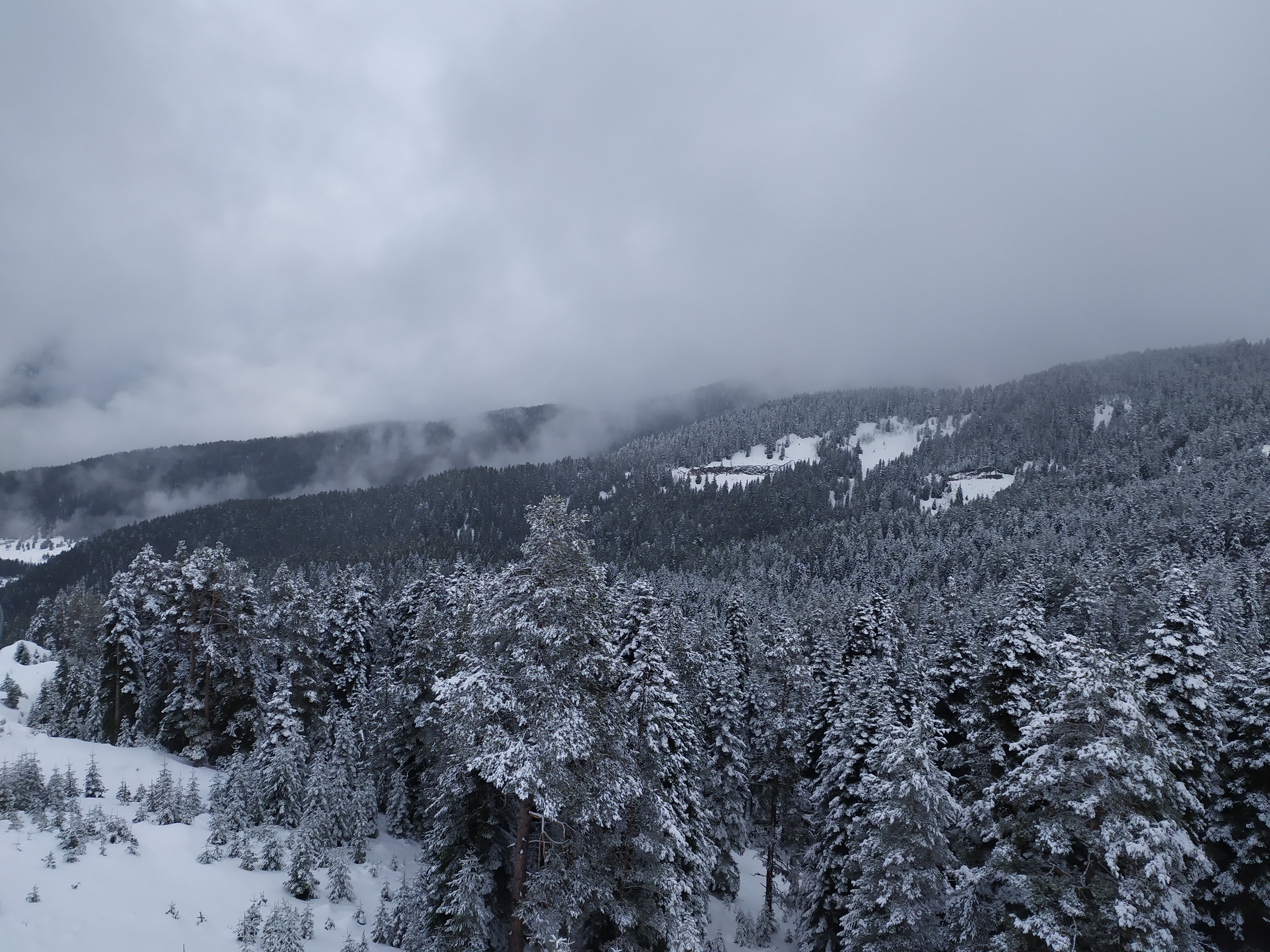
Ilgaz Mountain National Park

== Economy ==
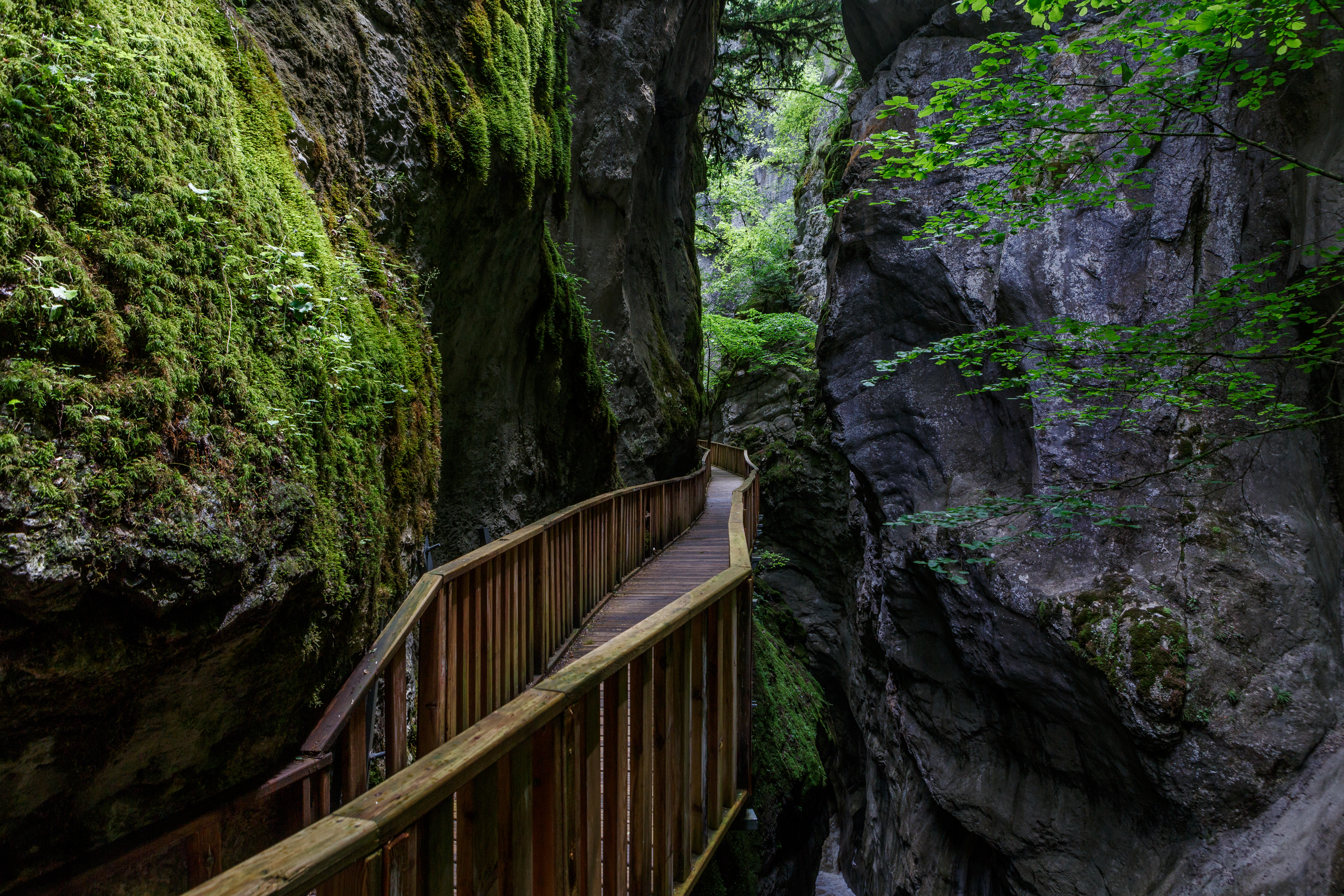
Horma Canyon.

According to the 2000 census, 77.5% of the labor force is occupied in agriculture. This ratio is higher than the country average. The second largest sector is public and private services (8.9%).

Almost all of the arable land has permanent crops. The agricultural products make up about of 0.01% of the total in Turkey. A large portion of the agricultural produce consists of cereals. Thanks to its widespread forest areas (a total of 57% of the surface area), forestry is also an important industry. Industries largely consist of manufacturing of forestry, agriculture and mining products.

Underground resources include copper, mercury, iron ore, chromium, manganese, asbestos, bauxite, graphite, phosphate, kaolinite, clay, limestone, quartz, marble, magnesite, fire clay, coal and nickel. There are also some natural thermal and mineral water springs, of which a few are suitable for economic investments.

Kastamonu shares about 0.4% of the GDP, the composition of the GDP is as follows (1998 est.):

- Agriculture: 32.8%
- Communication and transport: 20%
- Services: 16.8%
- Industry: 9.5%

Transportation is possible only through paved and unpaved highways; a railroad that will connect Çankırı, Kastamonu and İnebolu is under construction. Although the province has a 135 km long coastline to Black Sea, only İnebolu has a small port and transportation by the sea is almost non-existent.

There are around 112,000 telephone main lines in use, about 200,000 cellphone subscribers and 15,000 Internet users in the province.

== Miscellaneous ==
- Handcrafts are abundant in Kastamonu, especially in rural areas. Most available are hand-woven textiles.
- Several national and local annual festivities also take place in the province.
- In a research conducted in the province, 812 different food are identified that are specific to the region.
- The provincial soccer team Kastamonuspor competes in the Bank Asya 1st League (1st National Soccer League).
- The founder of the Turkish republic, Atatürk, declared the "dress code reform", which abolished the fez, in Kastamonu in 1925.
