= Cassaba =

Cassaba is:

- Kasaba, a village in the Kastamonu Province, Turkey
- Casaba, a melon

== See also ==
- Cassava, a woody shrub native to South America
