= Kastamonu Ethnography Museum =

Museum in Kastamonu, Turkey

- Kastamonu Etnoğrafya Müzesi
- Kastamonu Ethnography Museum
- Established: 1997; 29 years ago
- Location: Hepkebirler mah, Kastamonu, Turkey
- Coordinates: 41°22′32″N 33°26′44″E
- Type: Ethnography
- Collections: Seljuks of Anatolia, Jandarids, Ottoman
- Collection size: 6989
- Owner: Ministry of Culture and Tourism

Kastamonu Ethnography Museum (Turkish: Kastamonu Etnoğrafya Müzesi) is a museum in Kastamonu, Turkey

== Location ==
The museum is in a historic building named Liva Paşa Konağı ("The mansion of Liva Pasha") . The building is on Çiftehamam street of Hepkebirler quarters of Kastamonu at 41°22′32″N 33°26′44″E.

== History ==
The 3-storey mansion was built in 1887 by an Ottoman mir-liva ("Brigadier general") Sadık Pasha. In 1978 it was bought by the Ministry of Culture. In 1997 it was opened as an ethnography museum.

== Exhibit ==
In the ground floor is reserved for the library specialized on Kastamonu and the picture gallery of Kastamonu. In the upper floor various ethnographic items are exhibited. Most important of these is the portal of Mahmut Bey Mosque, a mosque built in Kasaba village in 1366 which is a masterpiece of art. The uppermost floor reflects the Kastamonu urban life by means of mannequins.
