= Mahmut Bey Mosque =

Mosque in Kasaba, Kastamonu, Turkey

- Mahmut Bey Cami
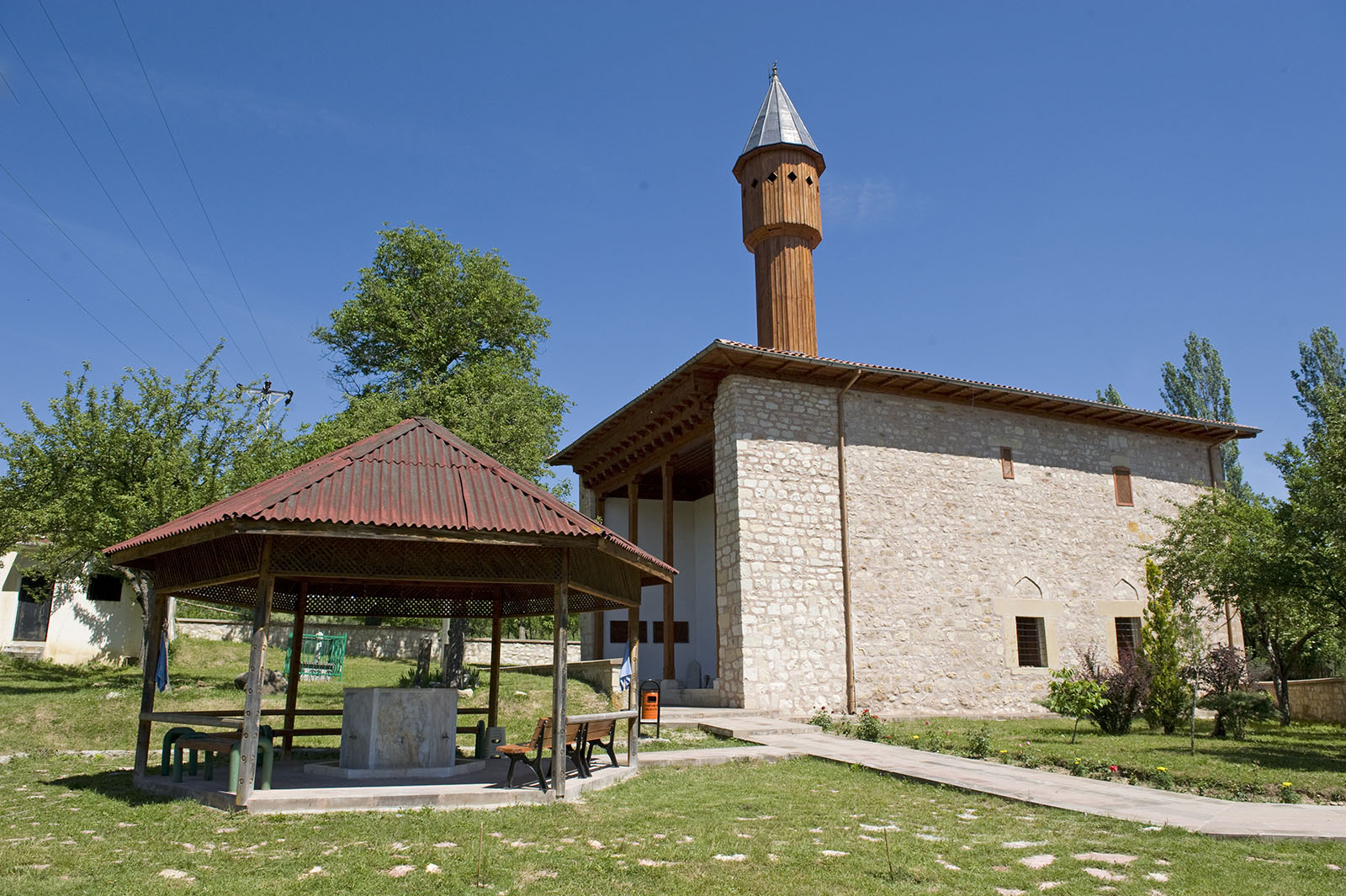

Location
- Municipality: Kasaba
- State: Kastamonu
- Country: Turkey
- Interactive map of Mahmut Bey Mosque
- Coordinates: 41°28′48″N 33°41′17″E

Architecture
- Type: mosque
- Founder: Mahmut Bey
- Established: 1366

Mahmutbey Mosque (Turkish: Mahmut Bey Cami) is a historical mosque in Kasaba village in Kastamonu Province, Turkey.

Kasaba was once an important settlement in Kastamonu Province. Now, it is a small village about 18 km (11 mi) to Kastamonu. The 14th-century mosque of the village is an important cultural building of the province.

== The mosque ==
It was commissioned by Mahmut Bey, a member of Candarid house in 1366. The mosque is unique in its building technique for no cement is used in the construction, except for the mihrab. The roof too was constructed without using any metal element. In fact, it is also known as Çivisiz camii meaning "mosque without nails". The plan of the mosque is rectangular. It is one of the first wood columned and wood roofed mosques in Anatolia. The exterior of mosque was constructed by hewn stone. Ceiling of the building stands on four pillars. Inside the mosque, all the wood surfaces are decorated with vegetal paint colored ornaments. The portal of the mosque, which was a masterpiece of art. It is now kept in the Kastamonu Ethnography Museum. A replica of the original portal has been mounted in place.

== World Heritage Site status ==
In 2023 the mosque was added to the list of UNESCO World Heritage Sites along with other medieval wooden hypostyle mosques in Afyon, Ankara, Beyşehir and Sivrihisar.

== Gallery ==
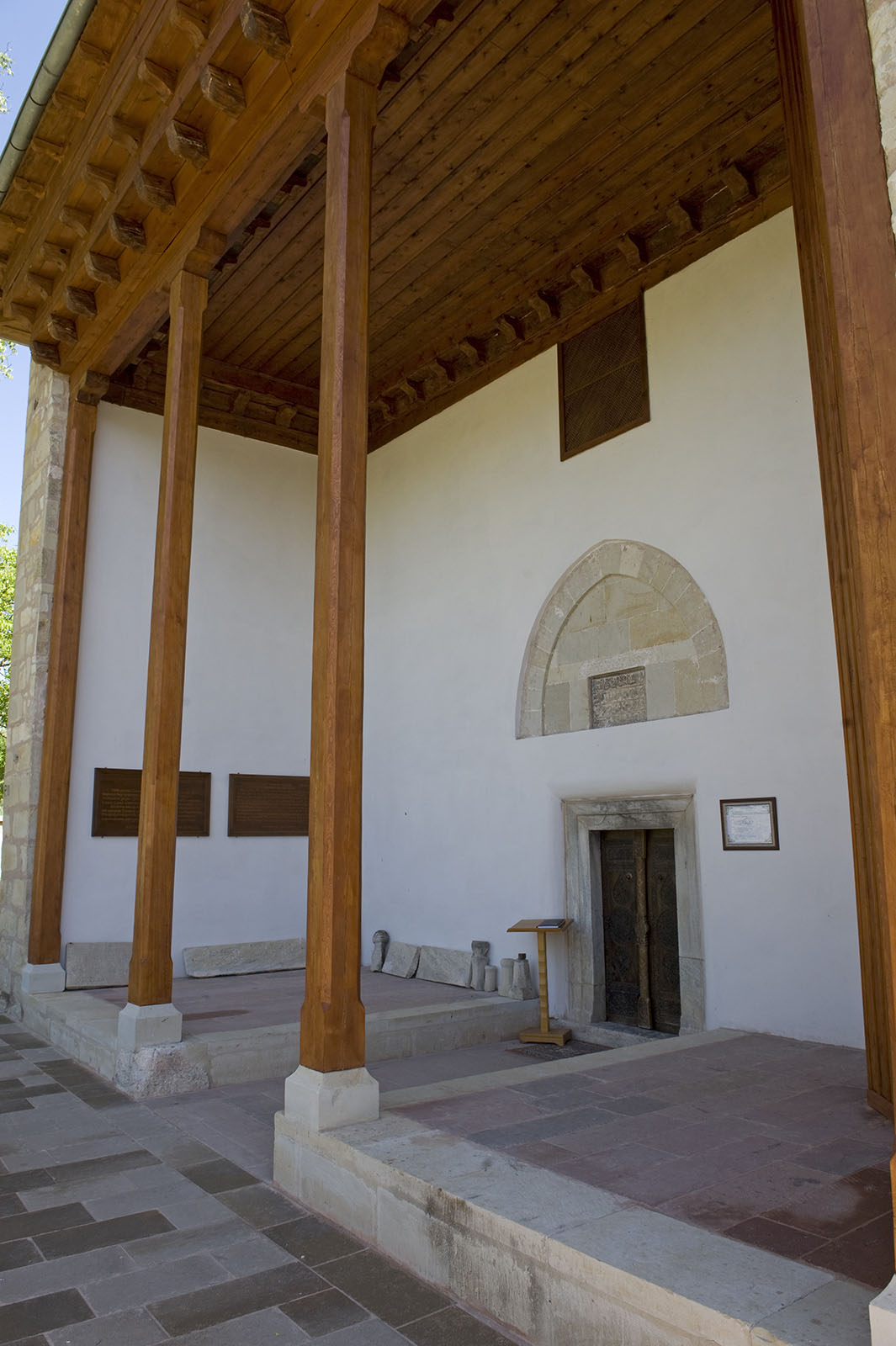
Kasaba Mahmut Bey Mosque entrance

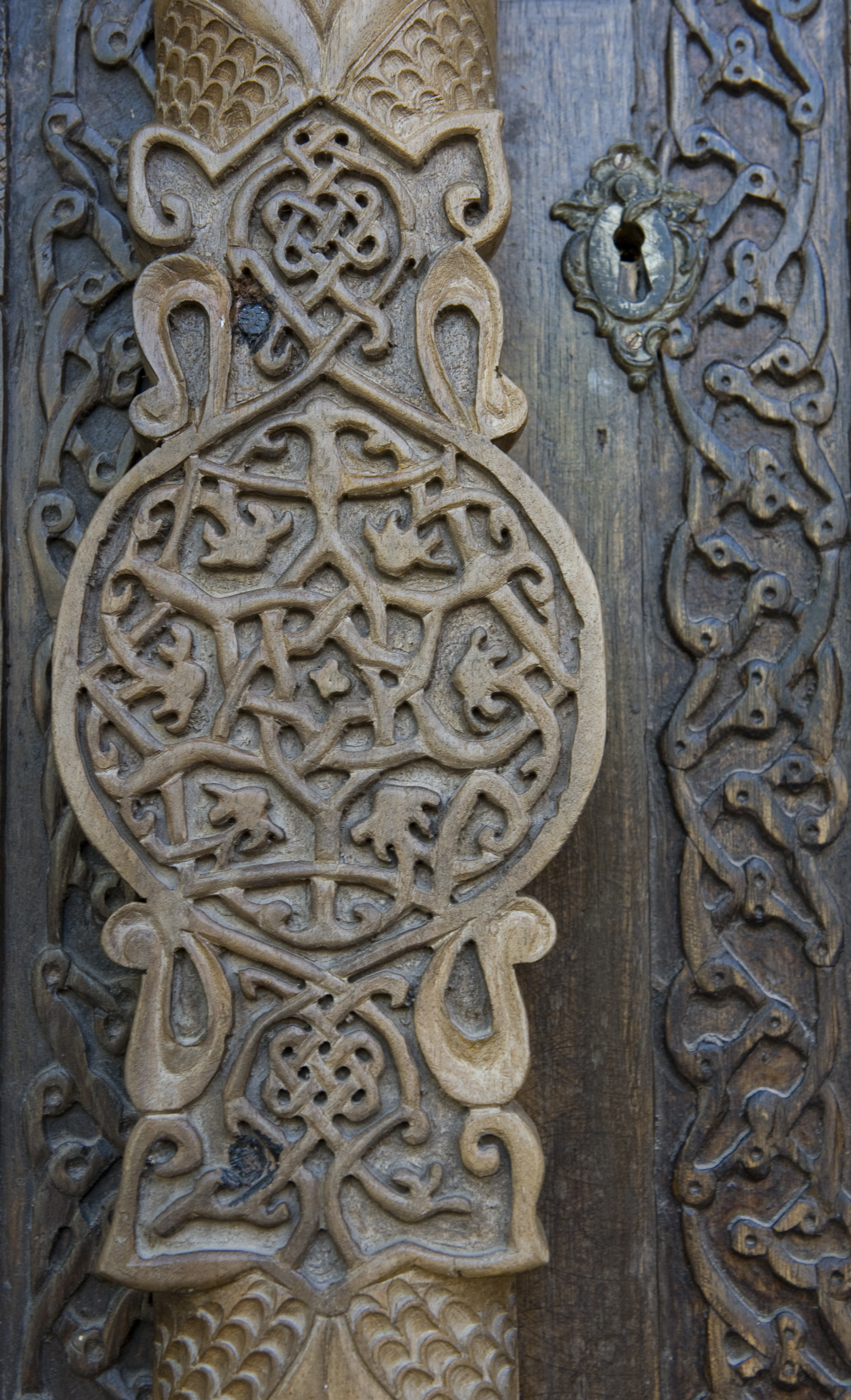
Kasaba Mahmut Bey Mosque entrance door detail

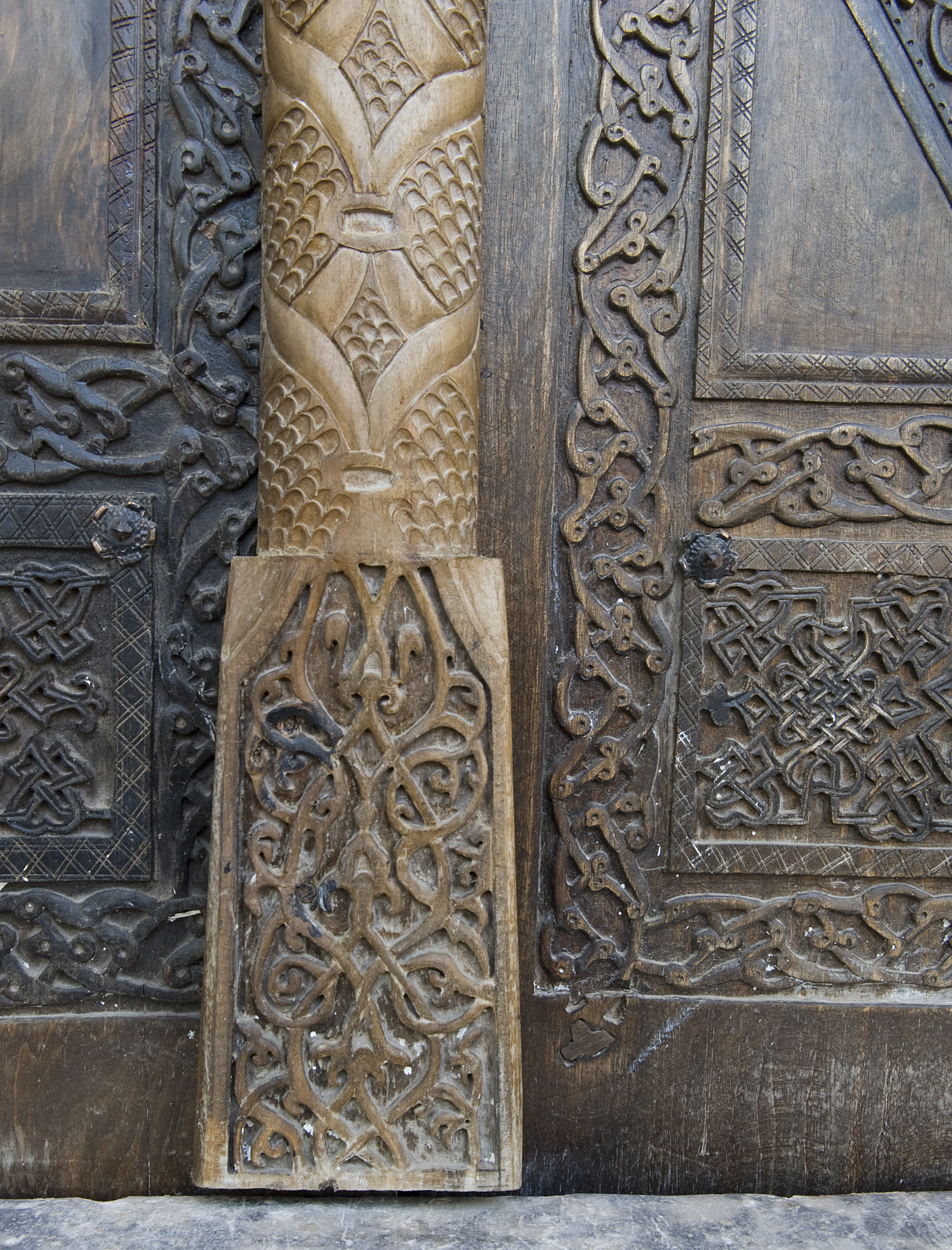
Kasaba Mahmut Bey Mosque entrance door detail

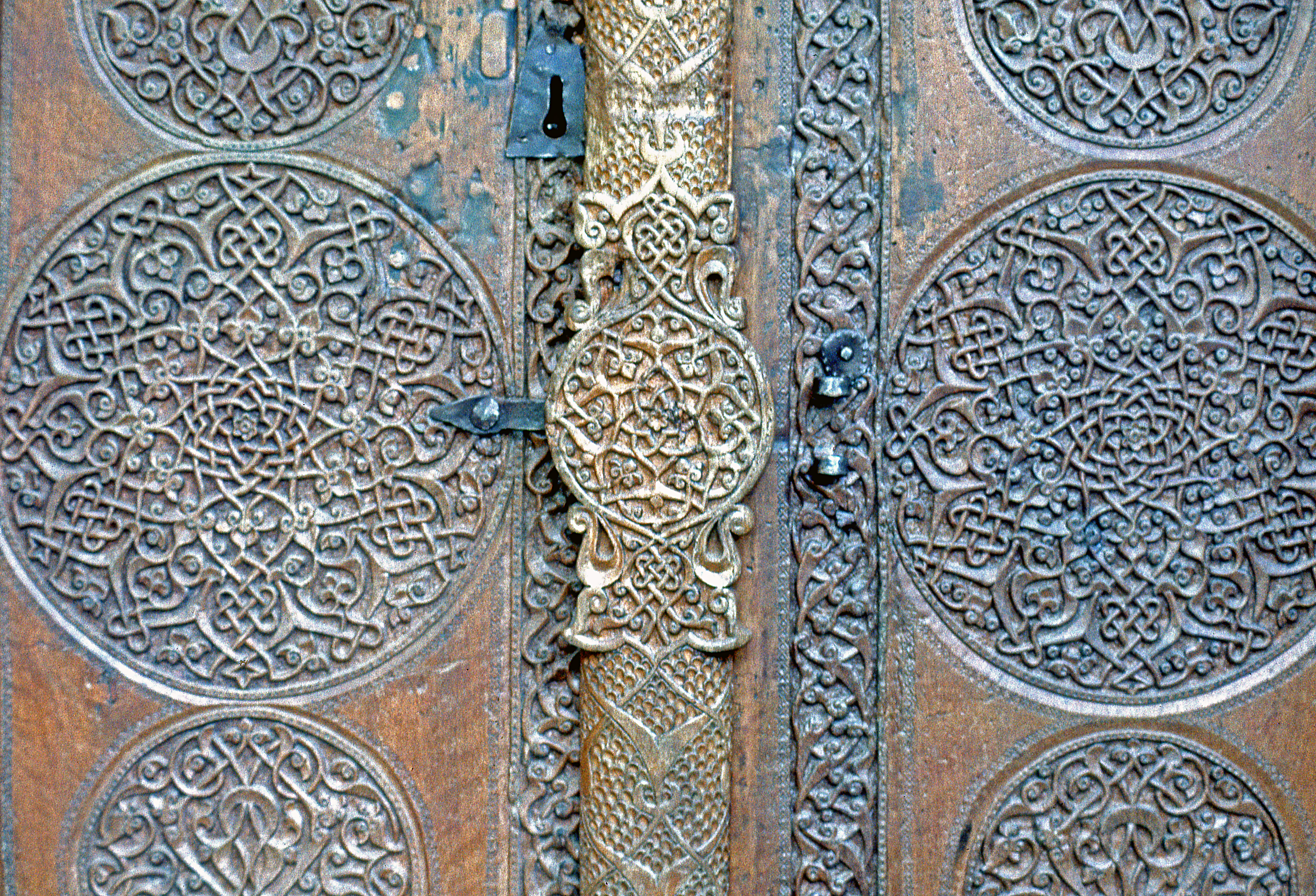
Kasaba Mahmut Bey Mosque entrance door detail

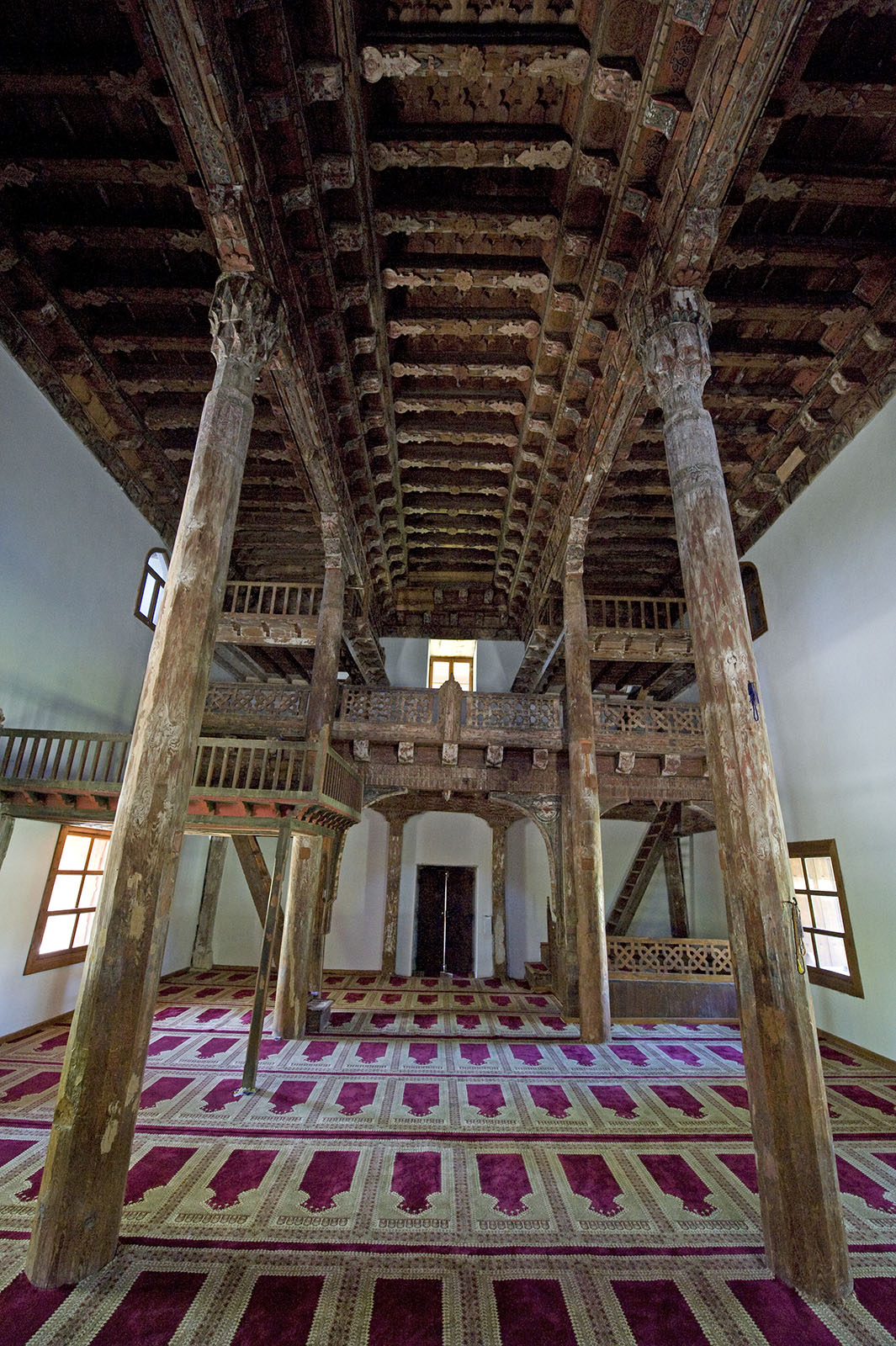
Kasaba Mahmut Bey Mosque view towards entrance

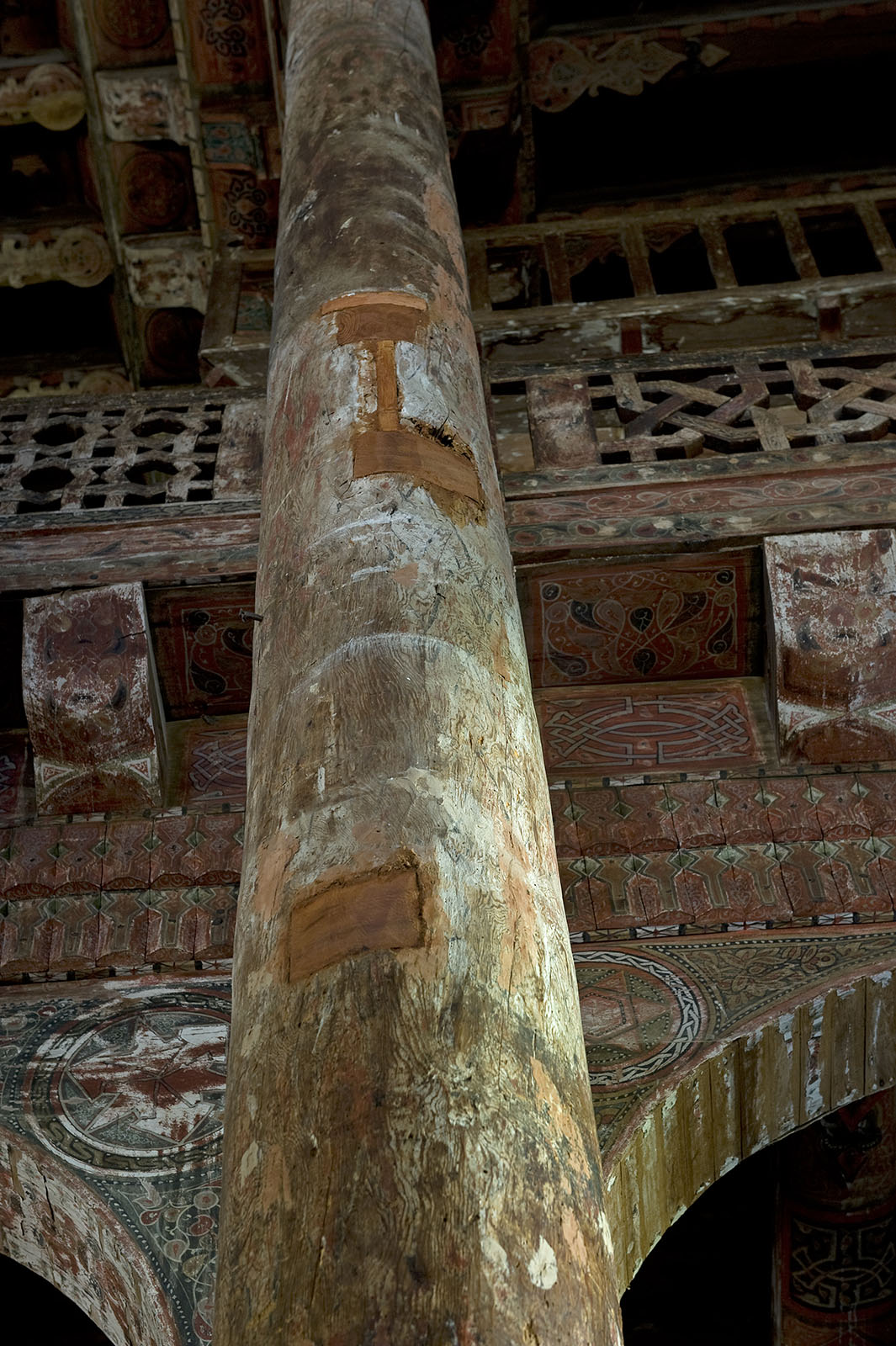
Mahmut Bey Mosque Interior

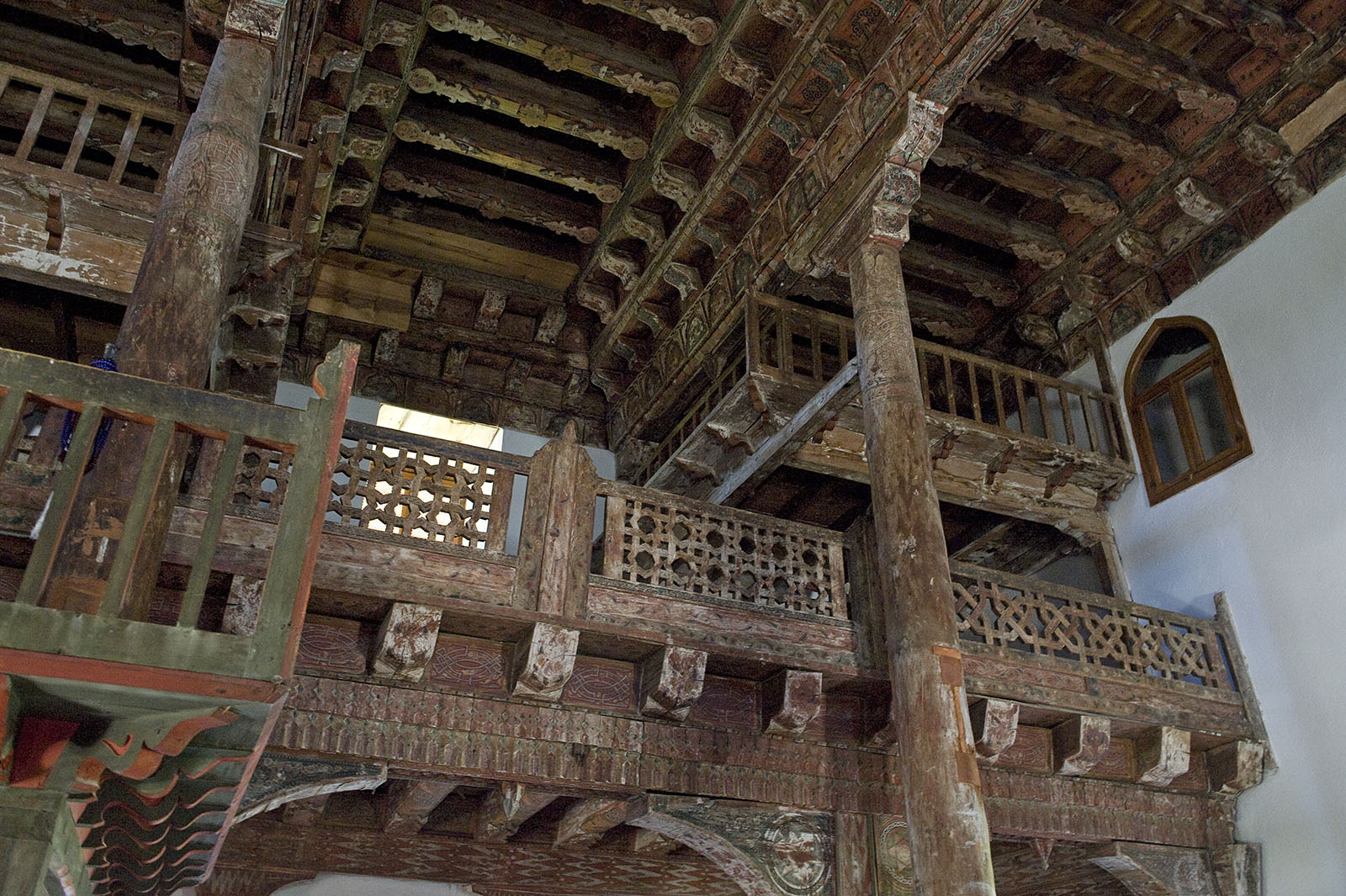
Kasaba Mahmut Bey Mosque Interior with balconies

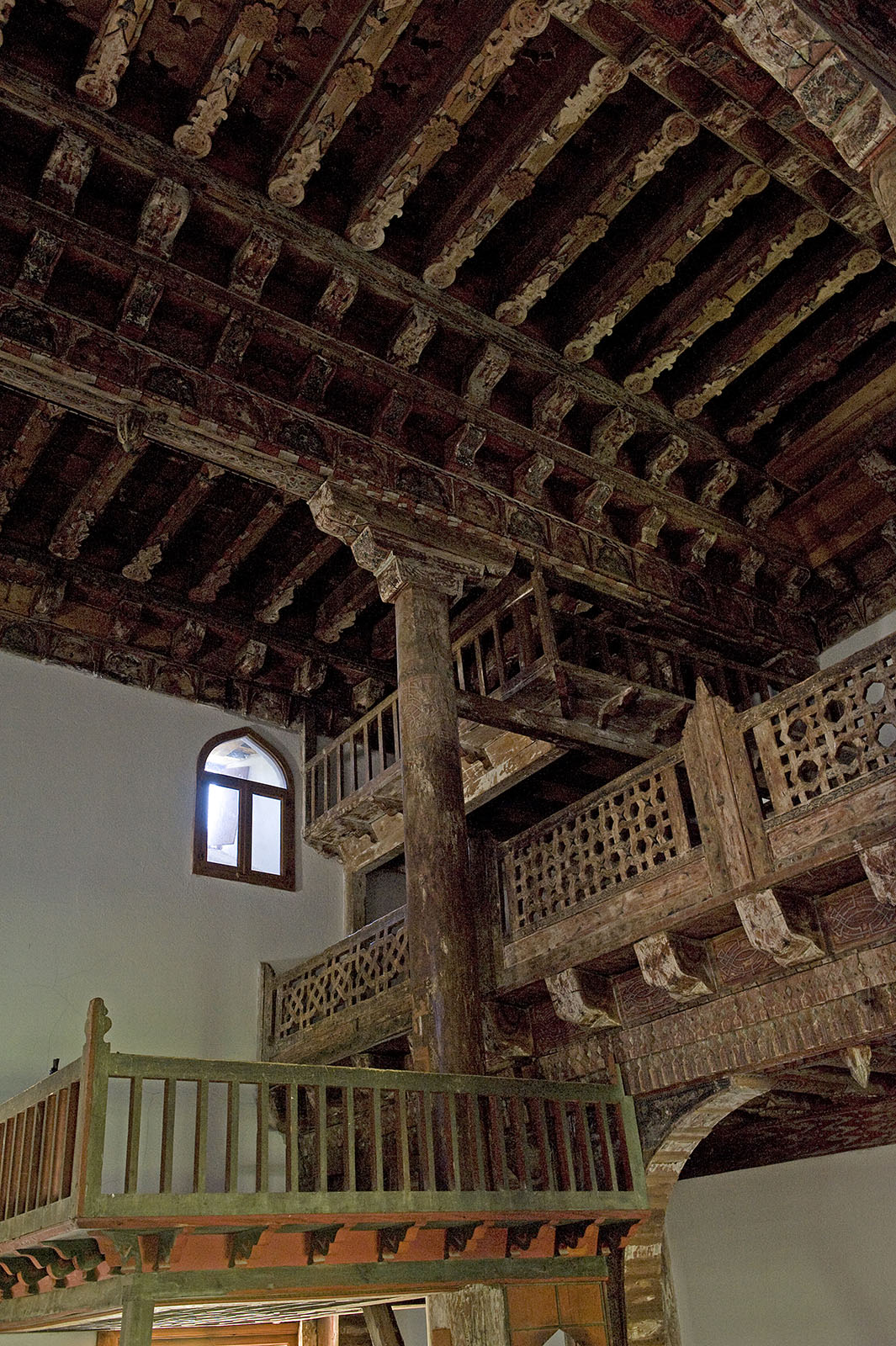
Kasaba Mahmut Bey Mosque Interior with balconies

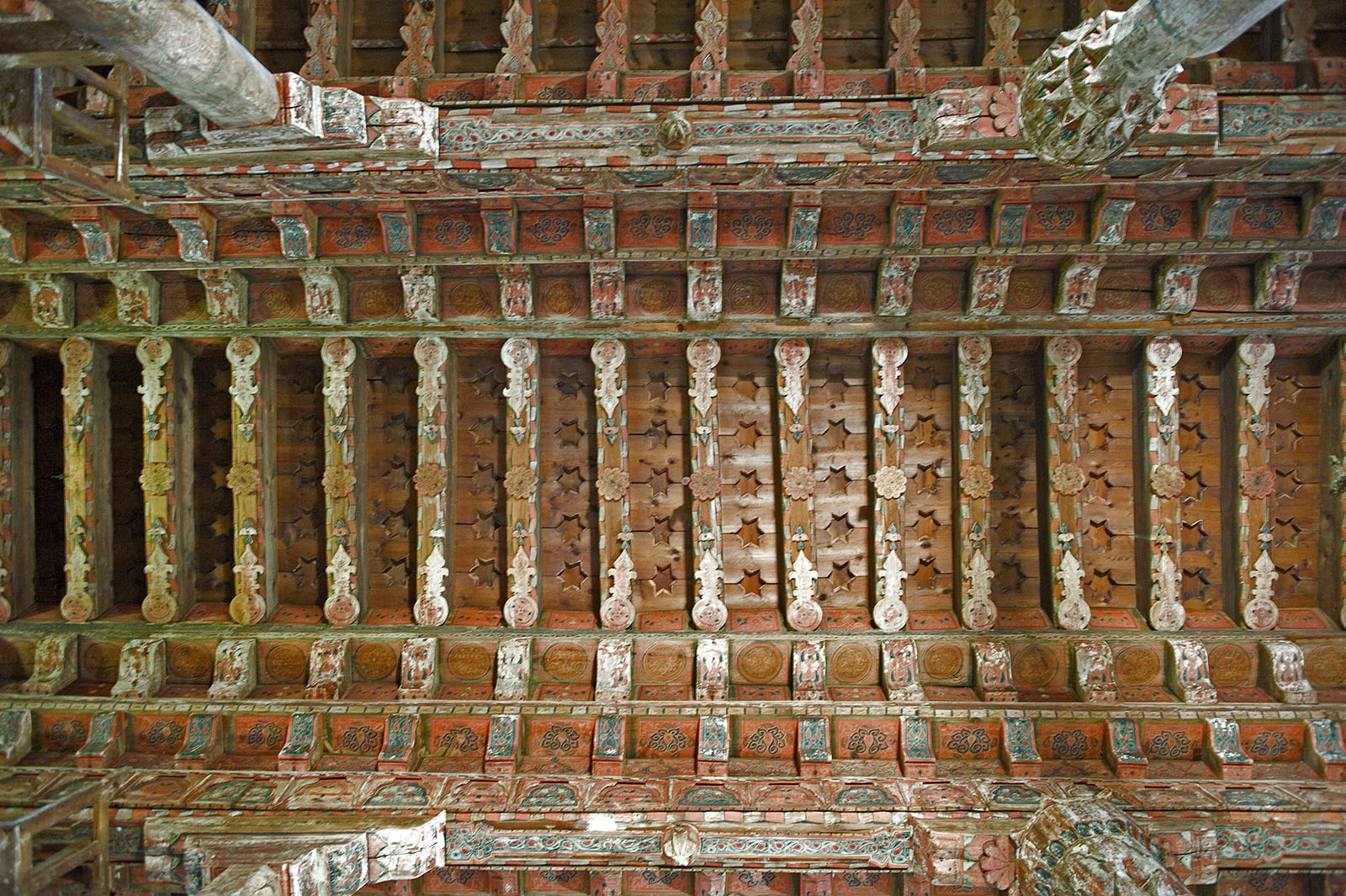
Kasaba Mahmut Bey Mosque Ceiling from te ground

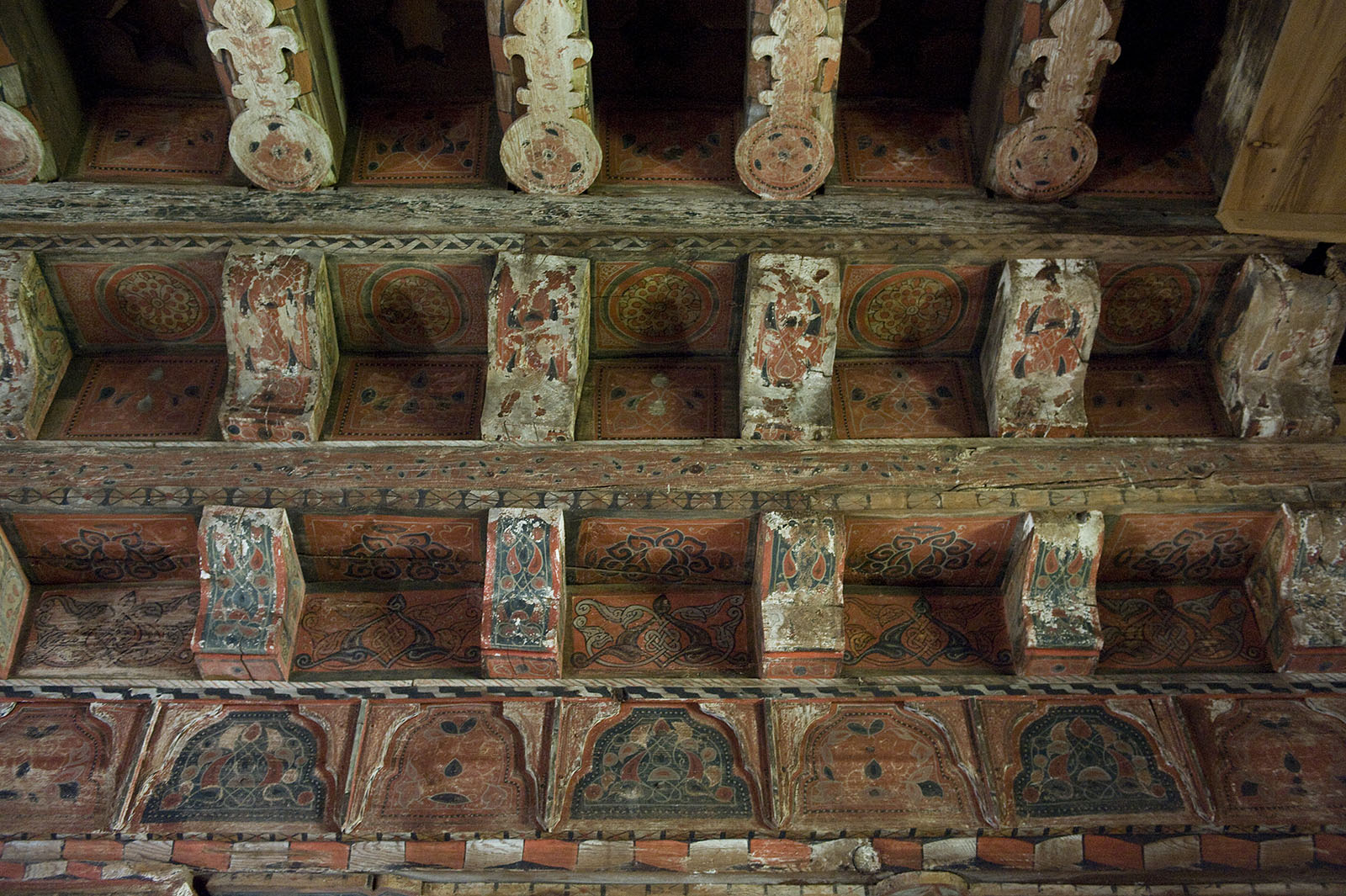
Kasaba Mahmut Bey Mosque Interior painting detail

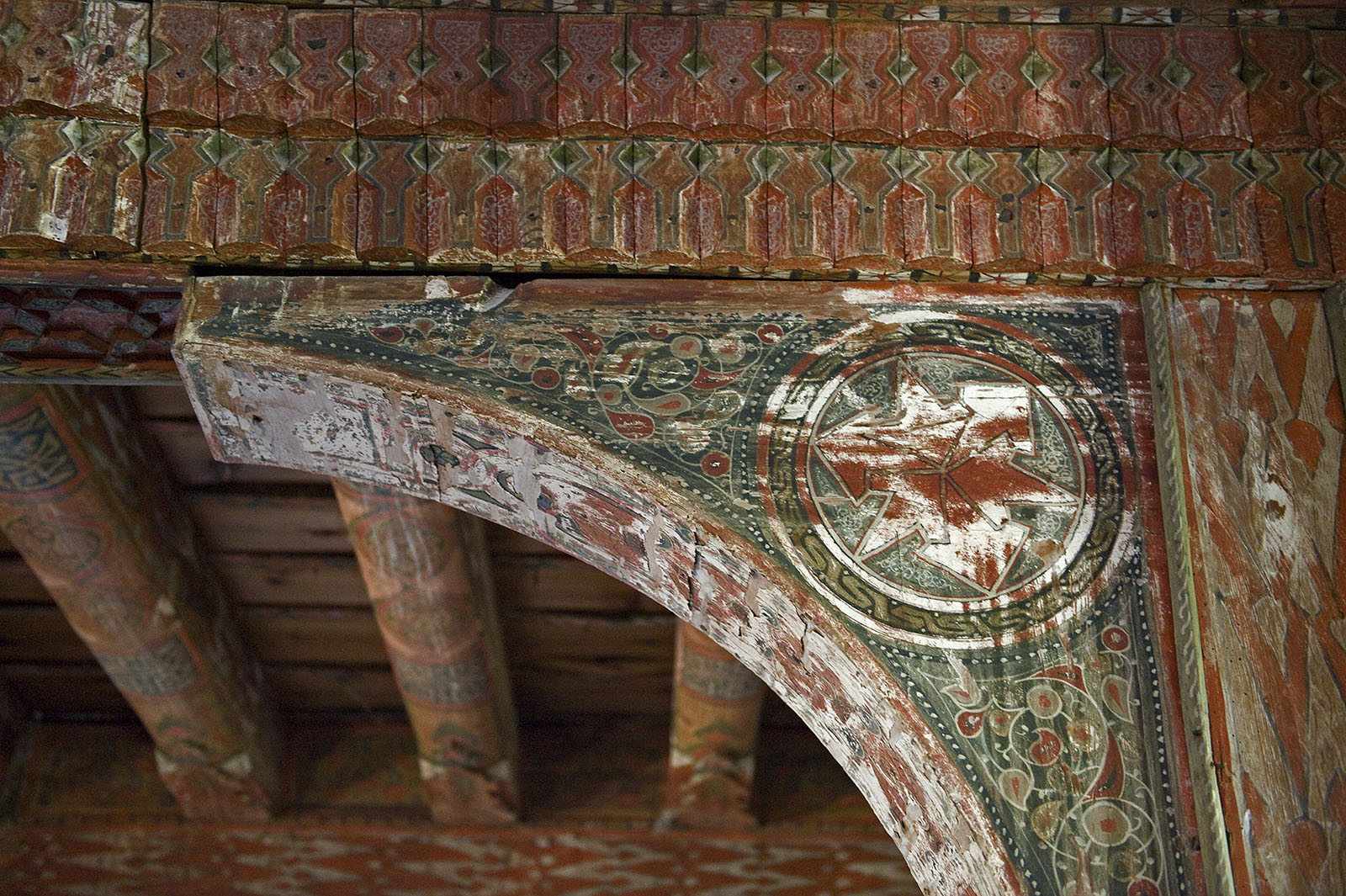
Kasaba Mahmut Bey Mosque Interior painting detail

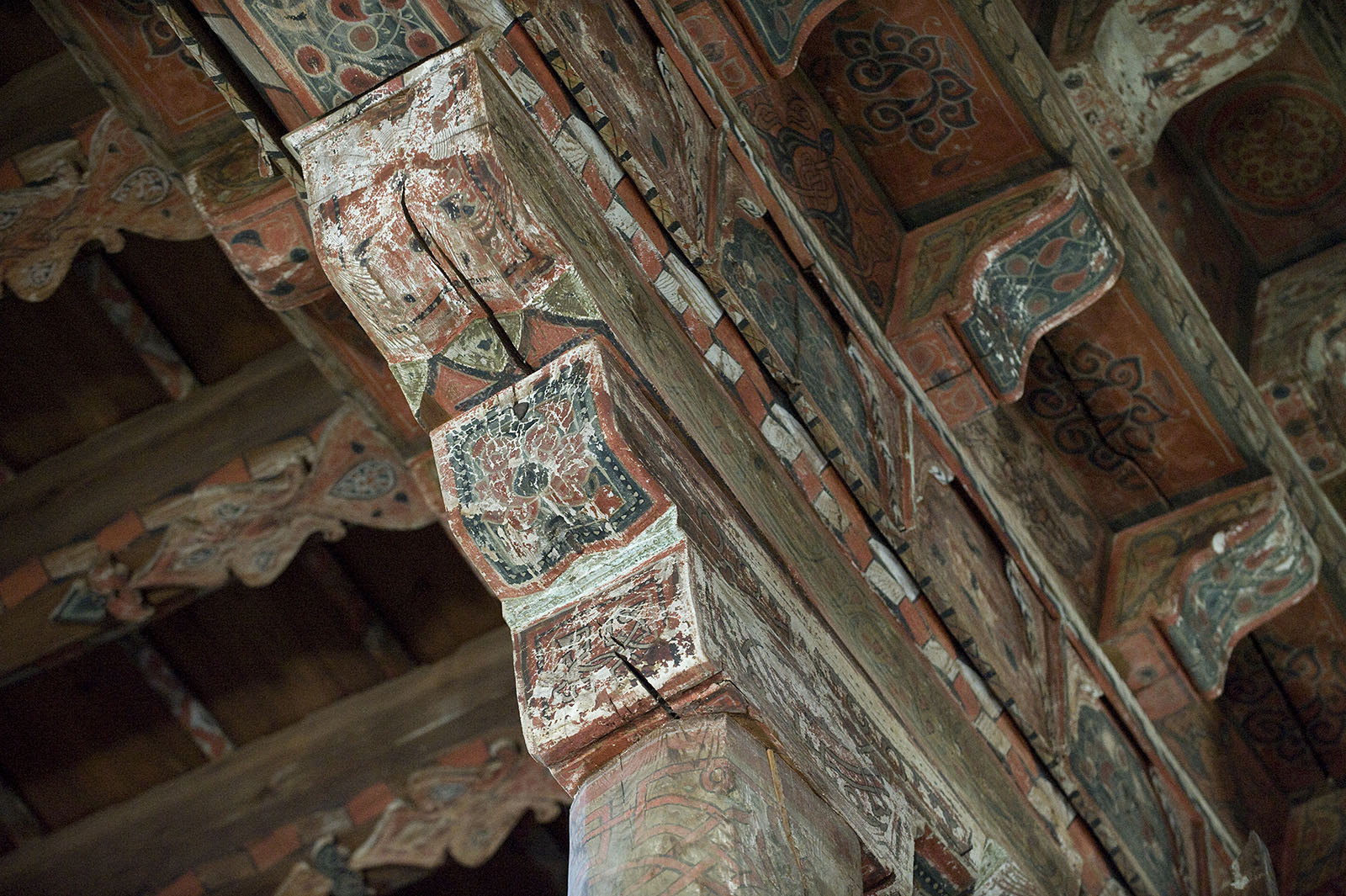
Kasaba Mahmut Bey Mosque Interior painting detail

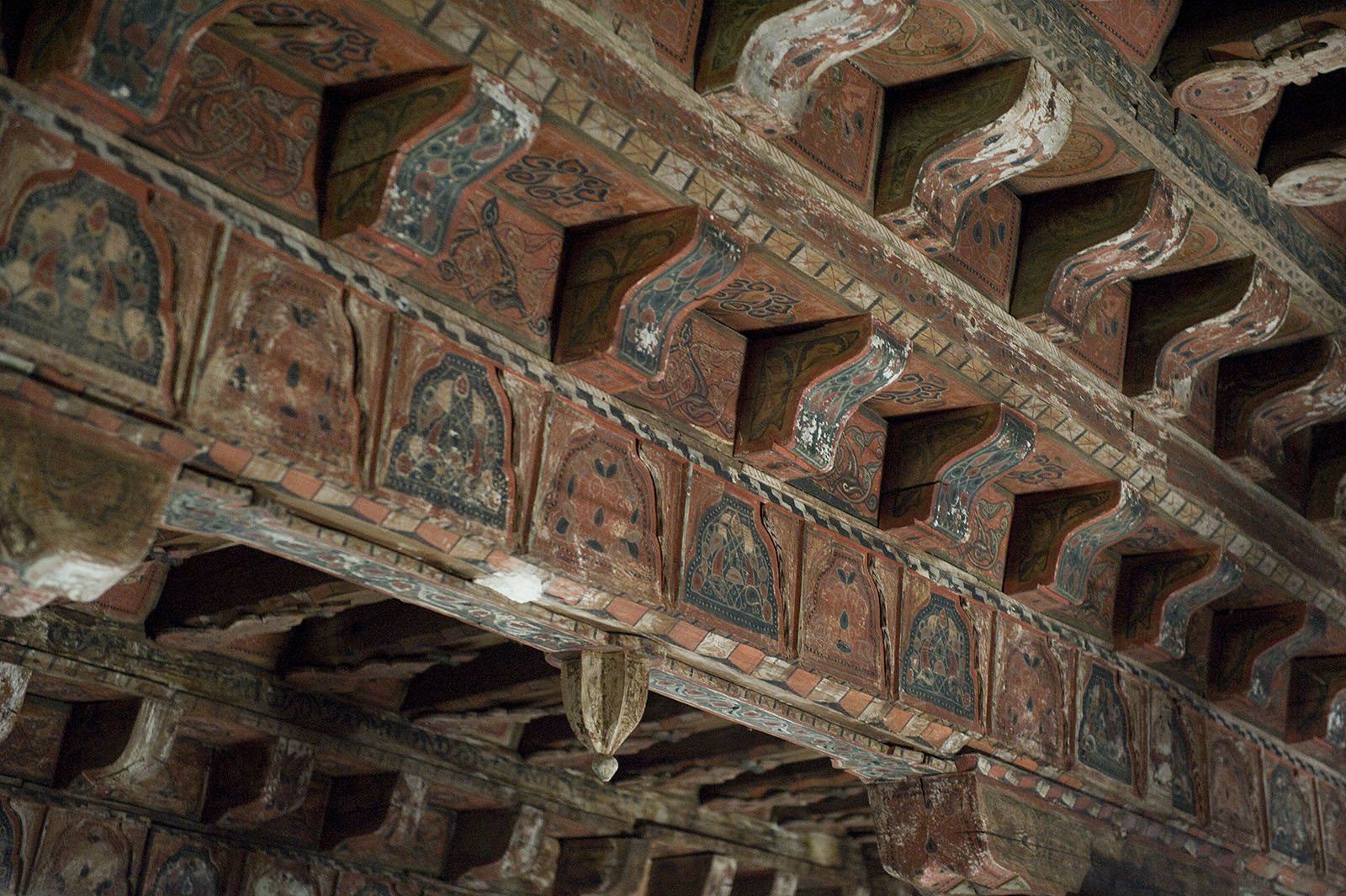
Kasaba Mahmut Bey Mosque Interior painting detail

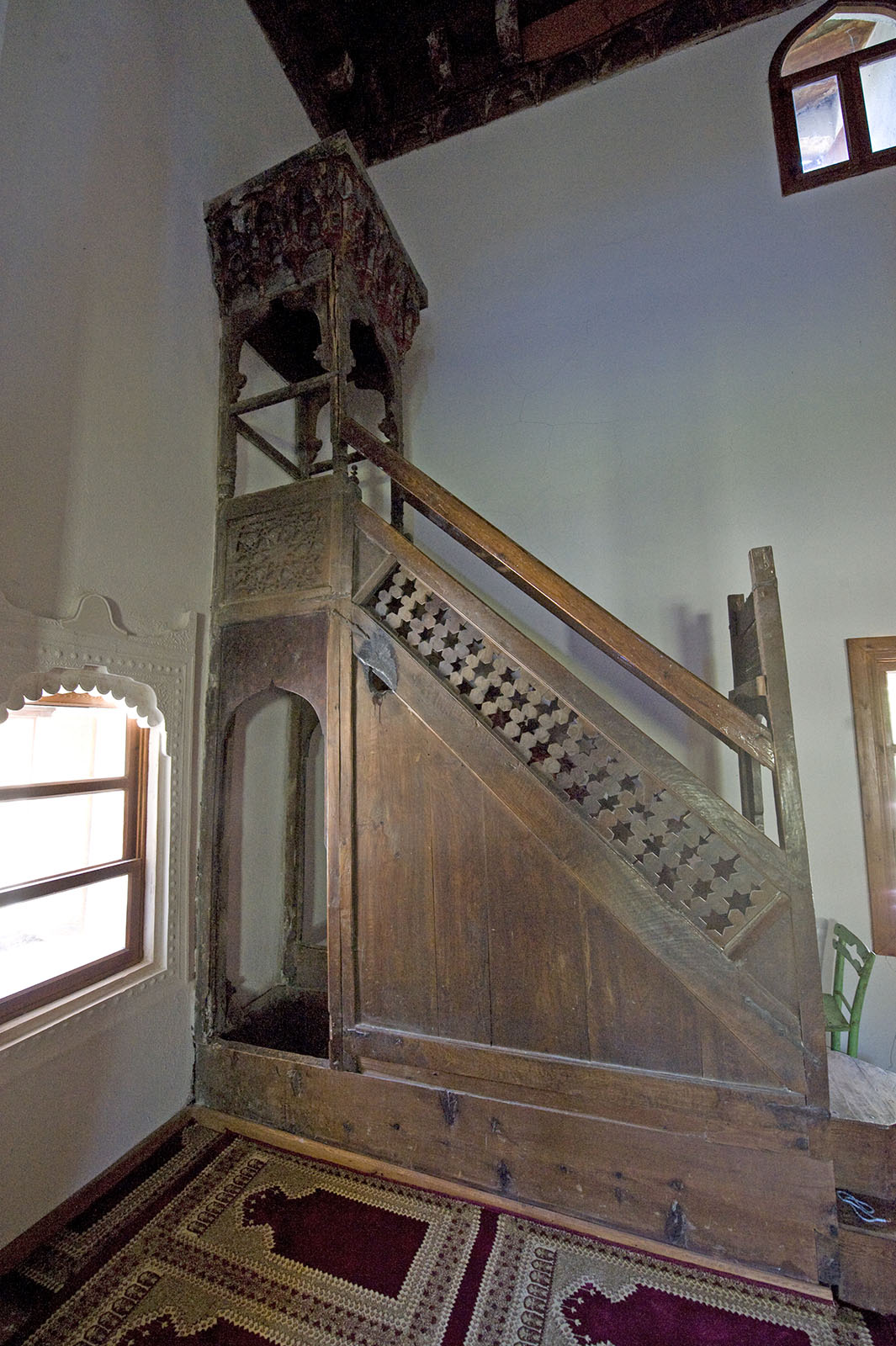
Kasaba Mahmut Bey Mosque The minber
