= Kasaba =

- Village
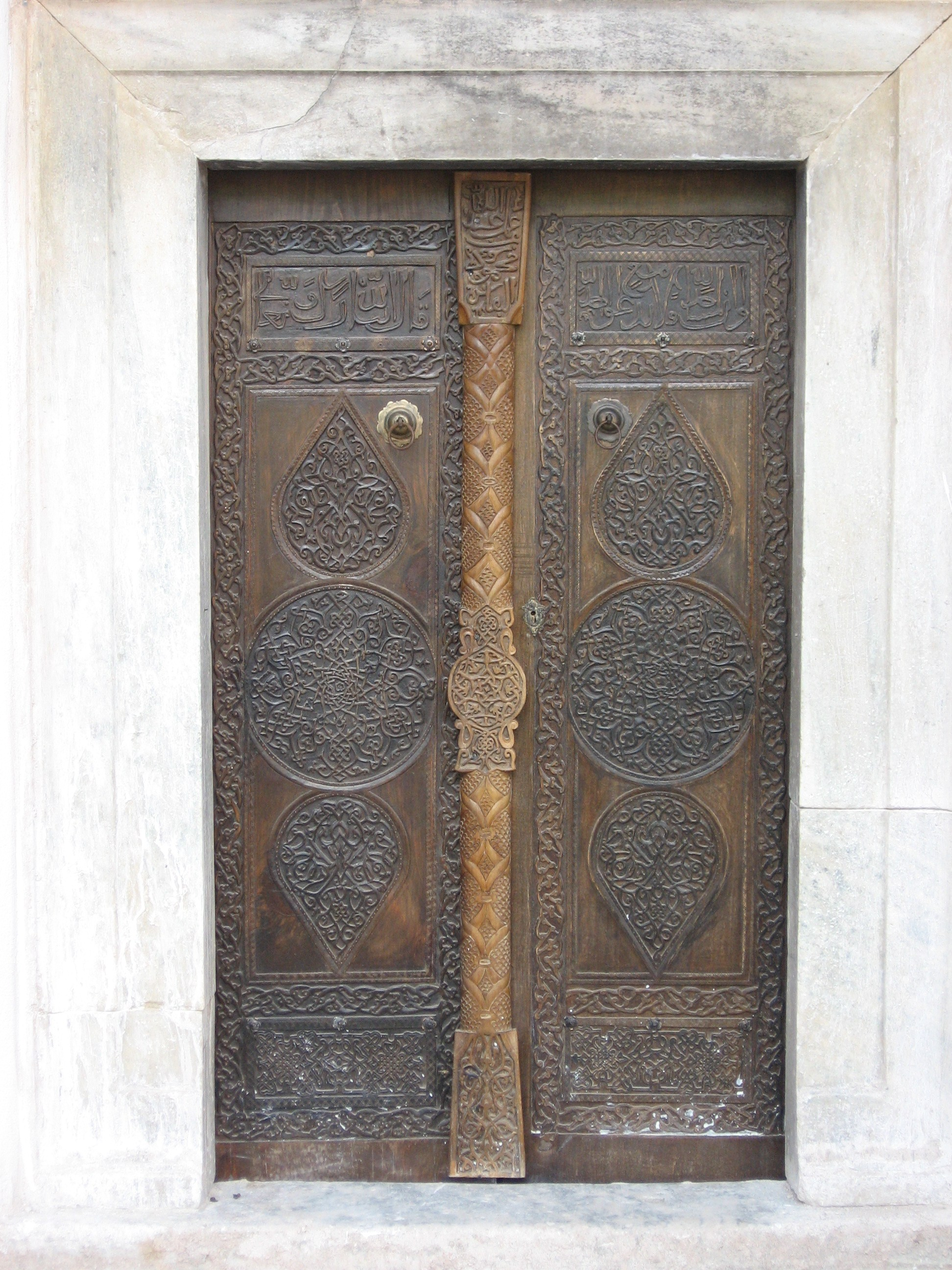
- Wooden doors of the Mahmut Bey Mosque

- Location within Turkey
- Coordinates: 41.4803°N 33.6861°E
- Country: Turkey
- Province: Kastamonu
- District: Kastamonu
- Population (2021): 84
- Time zone: UTC+3 (TRT)

Kasaba or Kasabaköy is a village in the Kastamonu District, Kastamonu Province, Turkey. Its population is 84 (2021). It is 17 kilometres outside Kastamonu, Turkey. It had a population of about 23,000 in 1905, when it had considerable local trade, but has since shrunk to only a few dozen households. Kasaba does not contain any ancient sites but does have an old mosque, the Mahmut Bey Camii (Mahmut Bey Mosque), built by a representative of Isfendiyarid dynasty in the second half of the 14th century.
