= Karakaş =

Karakaş is a Turkish word meaning "black eyebrow" It may refer to:

== Surname ==
Karakaş

- Ayşe Işıl Karakaş (born 1958), Turkish professor of law and international judge
- Cahit Karakaş (1928–2025), Turkish engineer and politician
- Cem Karakaş (born 1974), Turkish business executive
- İlker Karakaş (born 1999), Turkish footballer
- Kıvanç Karakaş (born 1985), Turkish footballer
- Sena Elçin Karakaş (born 2004), Turkish trampoline gymnast

Karakas

- Éva Karakas (1922–1995), Hungarian female chess grandmaster
- Hedvig Karakas (born 1990), Hungarian female judoka
- Mike Karakas (1911–1992), American ice hockey goaltender in the NHL

Karakasheva

- Mariya Karakasheva (born 1988), Bulgarian female volleyball player

Karakashian

- Narine Karakashian (born 1971), Armenian female chess player
- Verkine Karakashian (1856–1933), Ottoman-Armenian stage actress
- Yeranuhi Karakashian (1848–1924), Ottoman-Armenian stage actress

Karakashyan

- Nonna Karakashyan (born 1940), Armenian female chess player

== Places ==
- Karakashly, a village in the Salyan Rayon of Azerbaijan.
- Karakaş, Arıcak
- Karakaş, Baskil
- Karakaş, Yığılca
