= Karakas =

Karakas may refer to:

- Éva Karakas (1922–1995), Hungarian chess player
- Hedvig Karakas (born 1990), Hungarian judoka
- Mike Karakas (1911–1992), American professional ice hockey goaltender
- Karakaş, Turkish surname
- Karakaš, Serbo-Croatian surname
  - Marica Karakaš
  - Zdenko Karakaš
  - Karakaš Mehmed-paša
- Ptelea, Evros, formerly known as El-Karakas

== See also ==
- Caracas
- Charaka
