= Sıla Karakuş =

Turkish trampoline gymnast (born 2004)

- Born: 23 March 2004 (age 22) Karşıyaka, İzmir, Turkey

Gymnastics career
- Discipline: Trampoline gymnastics
- Country represented: Turkey
Medal record
Women's trampoline gymnastics
Representing Turkey
FIG World Cup
Gold medal – first place	2022 Baku	Synchro
European Championships
Silver medal – second place	2021 Sochi	Synchro J

Sıla Karakuş (born 23 March 2004) is a Turkish trampoline gymnast. She competes in addition to individual event in the synchronized trampolining event.

== Early life ==
Sıla Karakuş was born in Karşıyaka district of İzmir on 23 March 2004. She has an older brother.

She started gymnastics at the age of five with the encouragement of her family. She switched to trampolining with the advice of her coach when she was eight years old. She was always accompanied by her brother to the gym.

During her high school education, she missed a lot of sublects due to her absence. Her family and her school tried to make up for the shortcomings with private lessons and studies.

Karakuş is a student of Restaurant, Cooking and Food Service Management at Istanbul Bilgi University.

== Sport career ==
Karakuş is coached by Aysun Yıldırım.

To preparate for the European Trampoline Championships, she joined with teammates a national training camp in Bolu. She exercised three weeks every month. The training was six days a week, including four days of six hours in double training sessions and two days in single. She states that "many things, like physical fitness, weight, height and individual techniques, affect the harmony in the synchronized trampolining event. She and her partner form a compatible couple even thogh they live in different cities".

Karakuş competed in the Juniors age group's Synchro event with Elif Ceren Çolak at the 2021 European Trampoline Championships in Sochi, Russia, and won the silver medal with 44.830 points.

In February 2022, she captured the gold medal with her teammate Sena Elçin Karakaş in the Synchro event with 44.140 points debuting in the Senior category and at the FIG World Cup in Baku, Azerbayjan.
