= Emin Cemal Suda =

Turkish politician

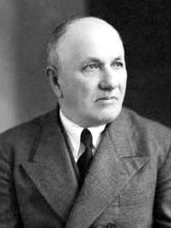

Member of the Grand National Assembly

Personal details
- Born: 1877 Chania, Ottoman Empire
- Died: 23 November 1940 (aged 62–63)

Emin Cemal Suda (1877 – 23 November 1940) was a Turkish far-right politician. He was elected to the parliament as a deputy from Bolu.
