= Elif Ceren Çolak =

Turkish trampoline gymnast (born 2005)

- Born: 26 August 2005 (age 21) Konya, Turkey

Gymnastics career
- Discipline: Trampoline gymnastics
- Country represented: Turkey
Medal record
Women's trampoline gymnastics
Representing Turkey
Bronze medal – third place	2021 Sochi	Individual J
Silver medal – second place	2021 Sochi	Synchro J

Elif Ceren Çolak (born 26 August 2005) is a Turkish trampoline gymnast. She competes in addition to individual event in the synchronized trampolining event.

== Early life ==
Elif Ceren Çolak was born in Konya, Turkey on 26 August 2005.

She is a student at Konya Sports High School in Selçuklu.

== Sport career ==
Çolak is a member of Konya Sports Club, where she is coached by Şükrü Alp Arı.

In October 2019, she took part at the Trampoline Colomiers French Open Tournament in Colomiers, France. She won the first places in the 13–14 years girls Individual and also in the 14–16 years girls Elite synchro event with teammate Livanur Yalçın.

For the preparation to the European Trampoline Championships, she joined and her partner Sıla Karakuş a national training camp in Bolu. She exercised three weeks every month. The training was six days a week, including four days of six hours in double training sessions and two days in single. Karakuş states that "many things, like physical fitness, weight, height and individual techniques, affect the harmony in the synchronized trampolining event. She and her partner form a compatible couple even though they live in different cities".

Çolak competed in the Juniors age group at the 2021 European Trampoline Championships in Sochi, Russia, and won the bronze medal in the Individual event with 52.385 points, as well as the silver medal in the Synchro event with teammate Sıla Karakuş with 44.830 points.
