= Streptomyces boluensis =

Scientific classification
- Domain: Bacteria
- Kingdom: Bacillati
- Phylum: Actinomycetota
- Class: Actinomycetes
- Order: Streptomycetales
- Family: Streptomycetaceae
- Genus: Streptomyces
- Species: S. boluensis

Binomial name
- Streptomyces boluensis Tokatli et al. 2021

Type strain
- YC537

Species of bacterium

Streptomyces boluensis is a Gram-positive, aerobic and non-motile bacterium species from the genus of Streptomyces which has been isolated from sediments from the Yenicaga Lake in Bolu.

== See also ==
- List of Streptomyces species
