= Bolu Museum =

Museum in Bolu, Turkey

- Bolu Müzesi
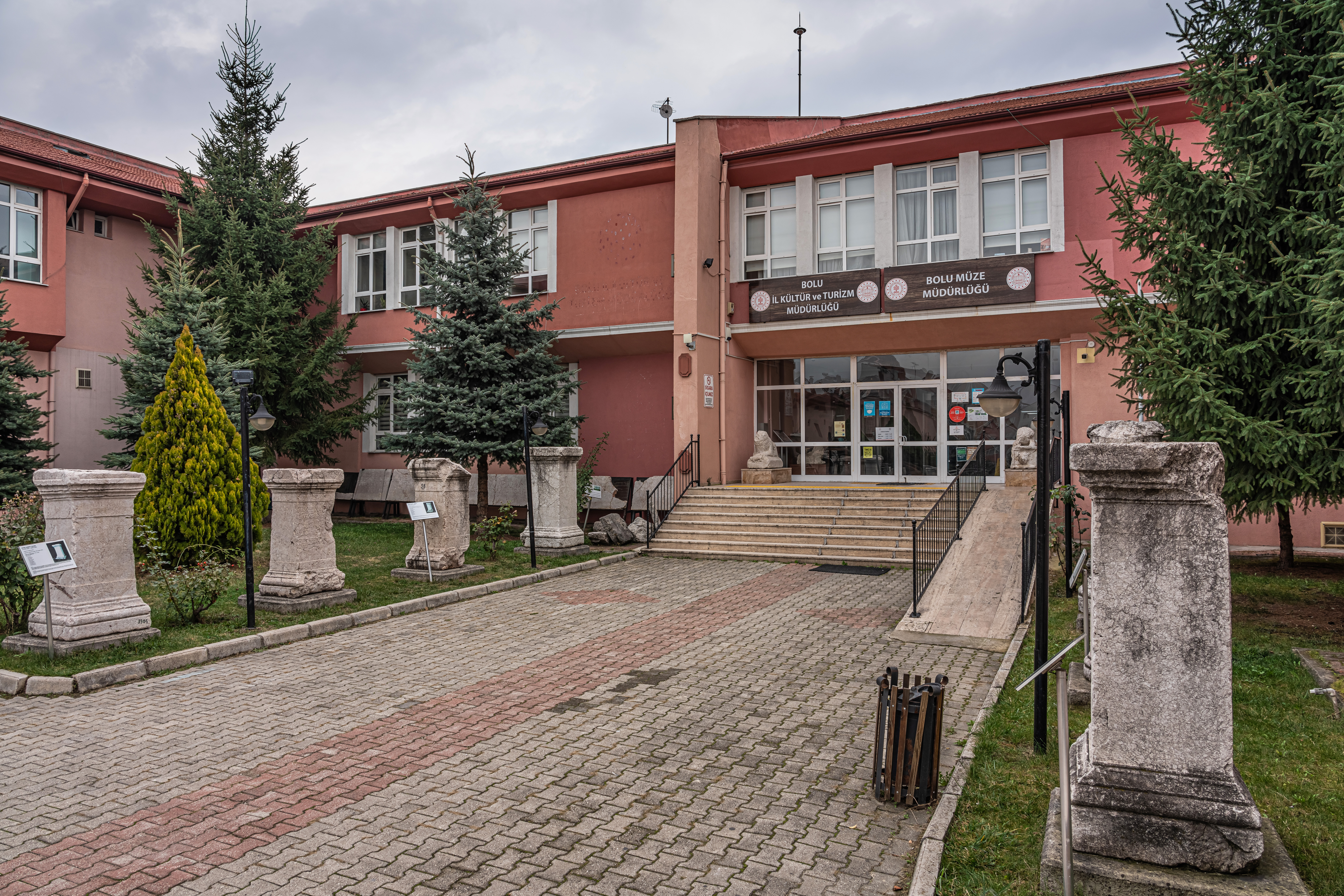
- View of the museum

- Bolu Museum
- Established: 1981; 45 years ago
- Location: Kültür Kompleksi, Bolu, Turkey
- Coordinates: 40°43′59″N 31°36′25″E
- Type: Archaeology, Ethnography
- Collections: Neolithic, Bronze, Phyrgian, Urartu, Lydia, Hellenistic, Roman, Byzantine, Ottoman Empire
- Collection size: 1,678 archaeologic, 1,680 ethnographic, 11,350 coins
- Owner: Ministry of Culture and Tourism

Bolu Museum is a museum in Bolu, Turkey. Bolu was a city of the Bithynia kingdom in antiquity.

== Location ==
The museum is on Stadyum street of Bolu at 40°43′59″N 31°36′25″E. It is a two-storey building and a part of cultural complex in Bolu.

== History ==
The museum was opened on 14 November 1981. It was damaged in 1999 Düzce earthquake. After a restoration period, it was reopened on 18 May 2006.

== Exhibits ==
In the archaeology section, which is situated on the ground floor, the items from Neolithic, Bronze, Phyrgian, Urartu, Lydia, Hellenistic, Roman, Byzantine ages are exhibited. Some of these items are marble, glass, metallic and terra-cota articles. The sculptures of Asklepios, Hygeia, Telesphorus (from Seben Çeltikdere excavations) and Herakles (from Bolu), the bust of Hermes, stel of a gladiator are the most important items. There are 1,678 items in the archaeology section

In the ethnography section, which is situated on the upper floor, items from the Ottoman Empire age such as religious works, weapons, ornaments, clothes and metallic tools are exhibited. Embroidery from Mudurnu region is also exhibited in this section. In a part of the ethnographic section, a typical Bolu house life is portrayed. The number of items in this section is 1,680

In 2021, a painted female head statue which was discovered in 1970s, has been determined to be the head of Artemis.

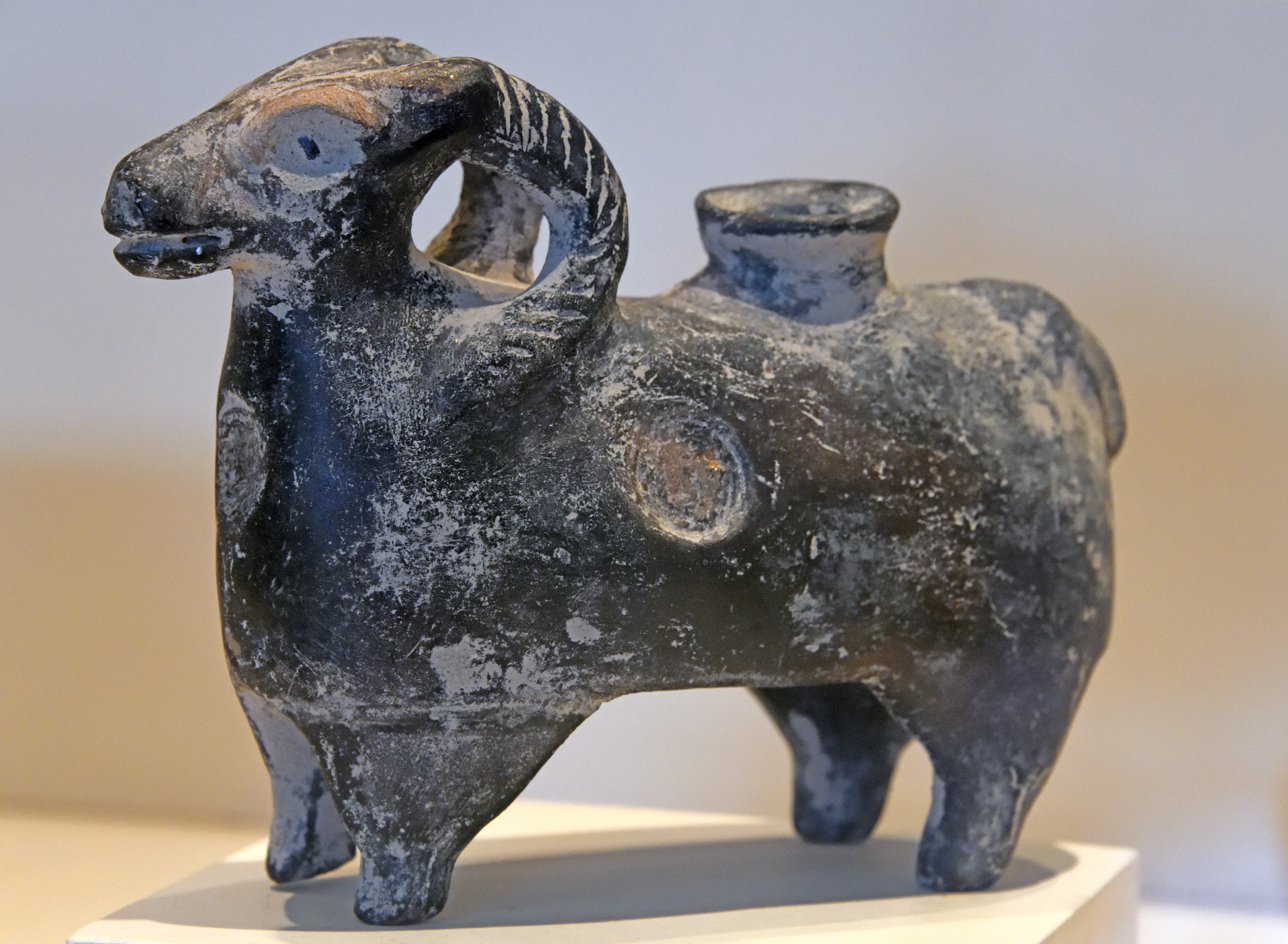
Bolu Museum Bronze age Rhyton

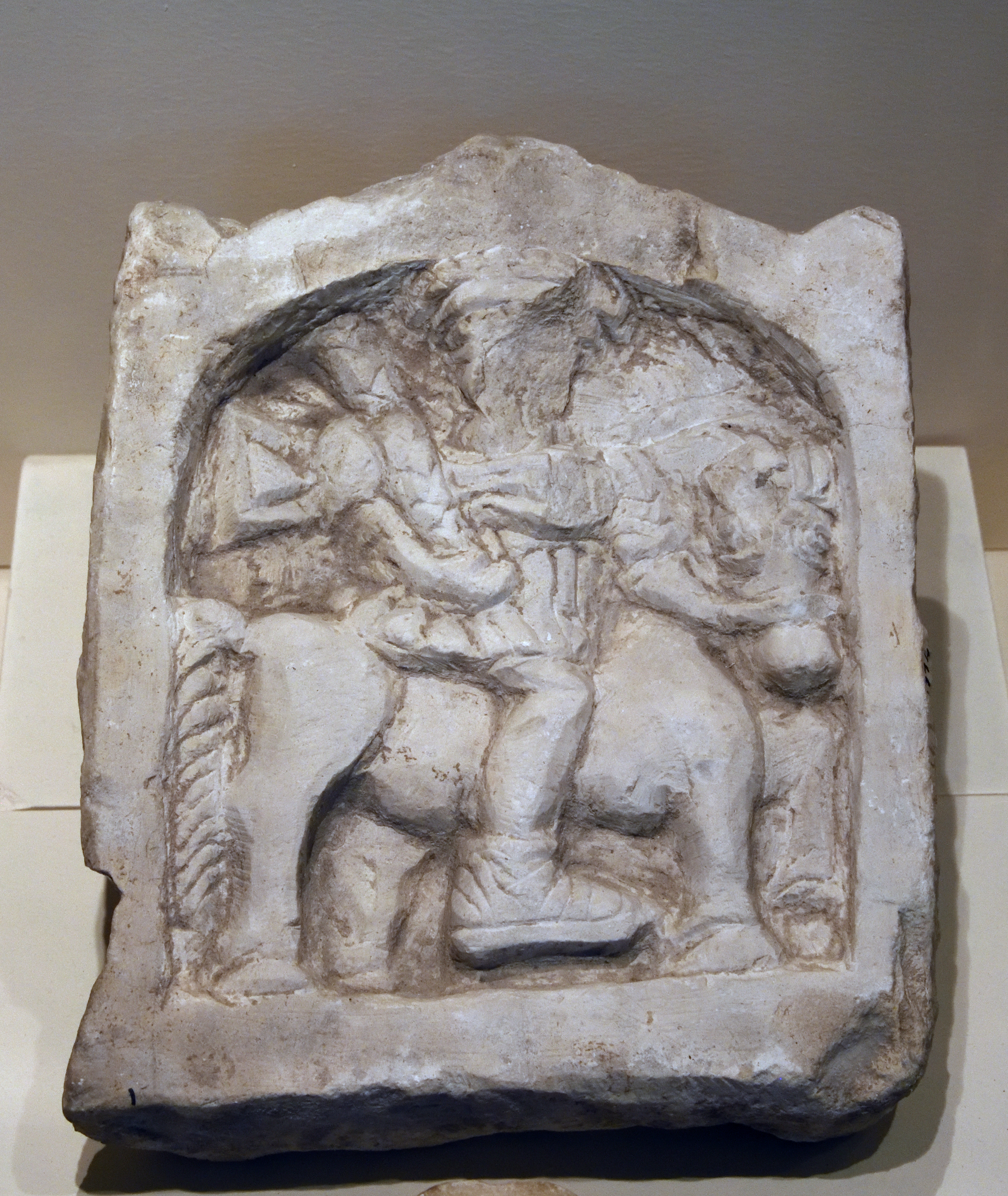
Bolu Museum Roman Stele of promise

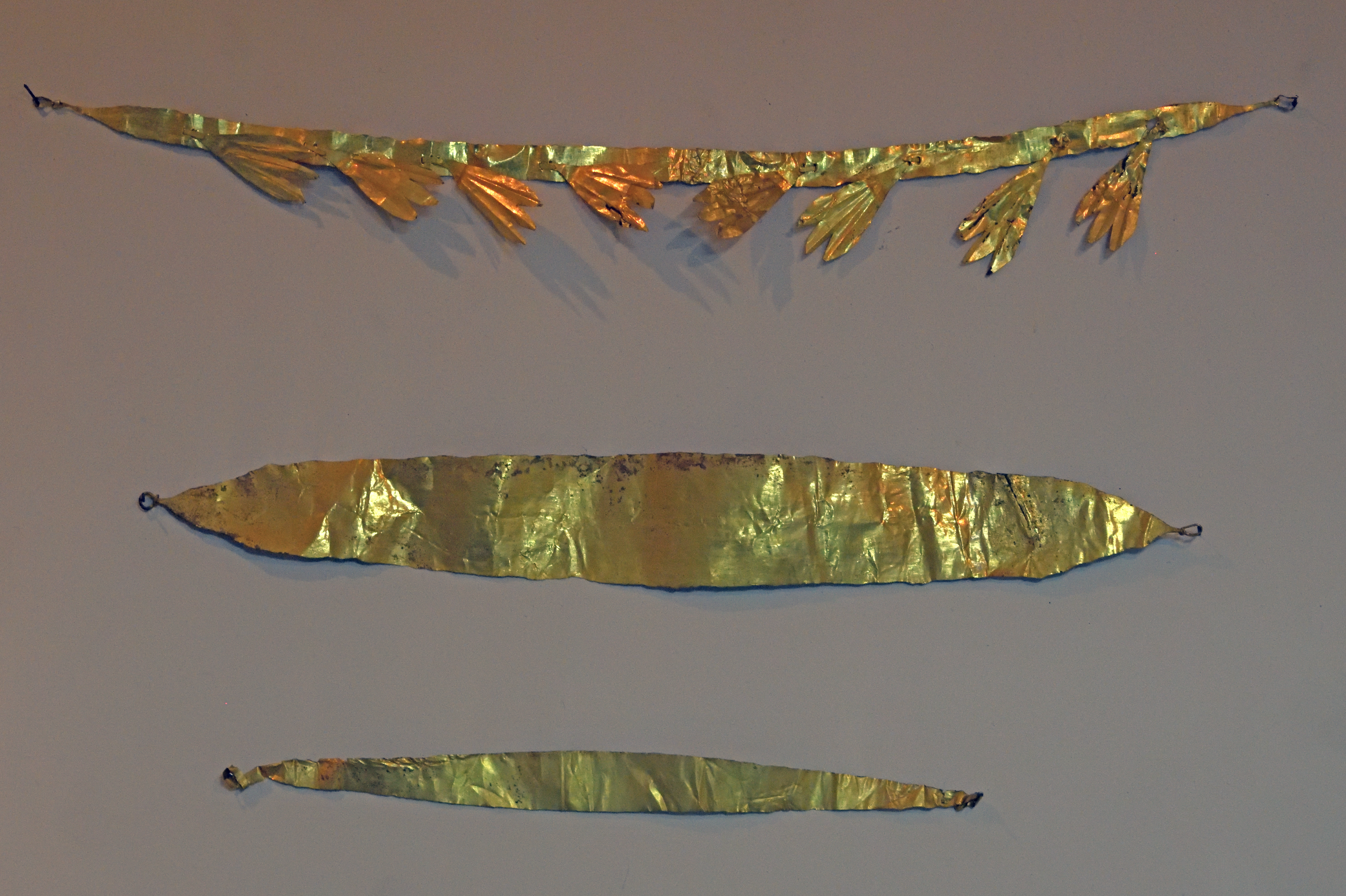
Bolu Museum Roman ornaments Diadem

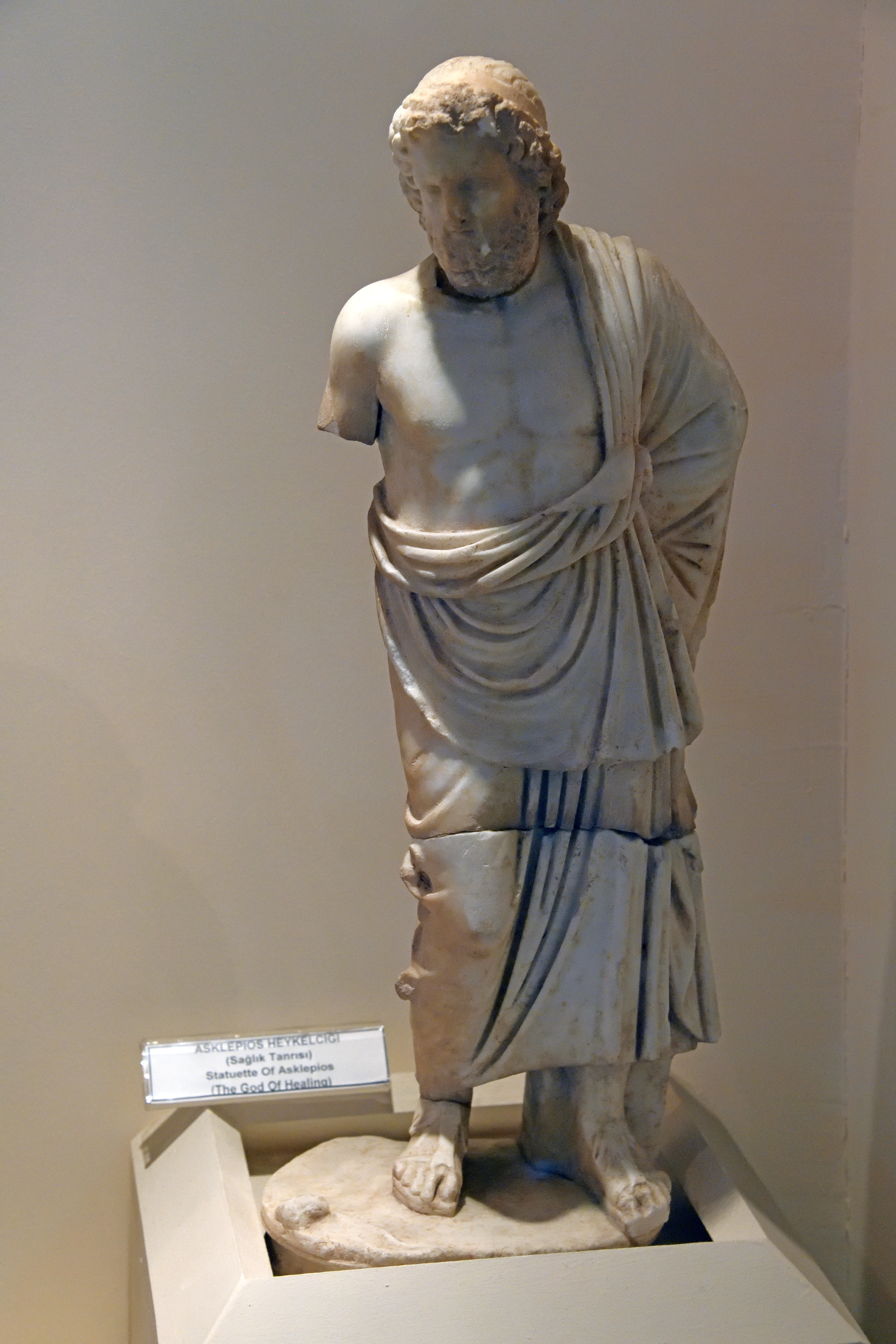
Bolu Museum Roman Asklepios statuette

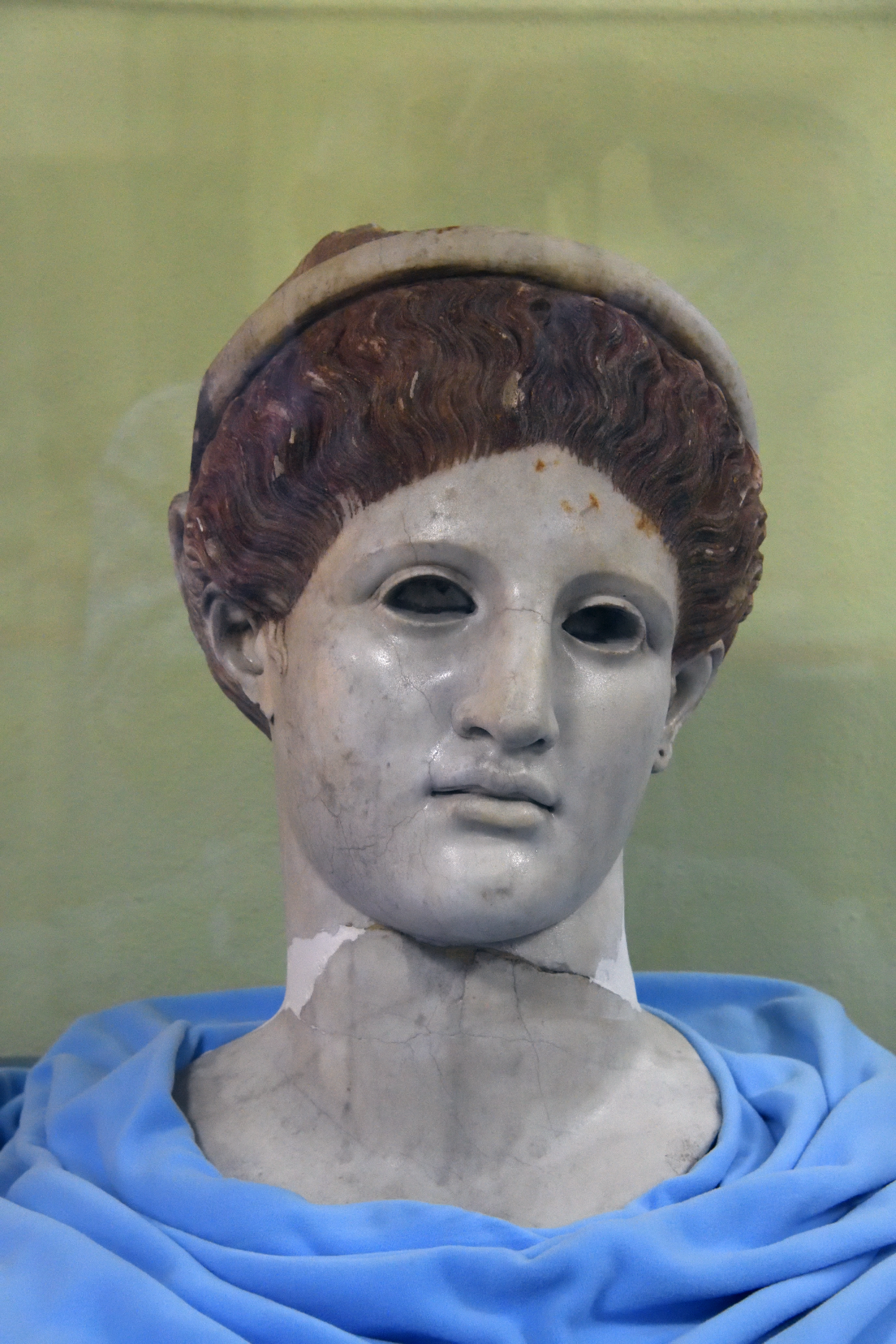
Bolu Museum Cult statue head

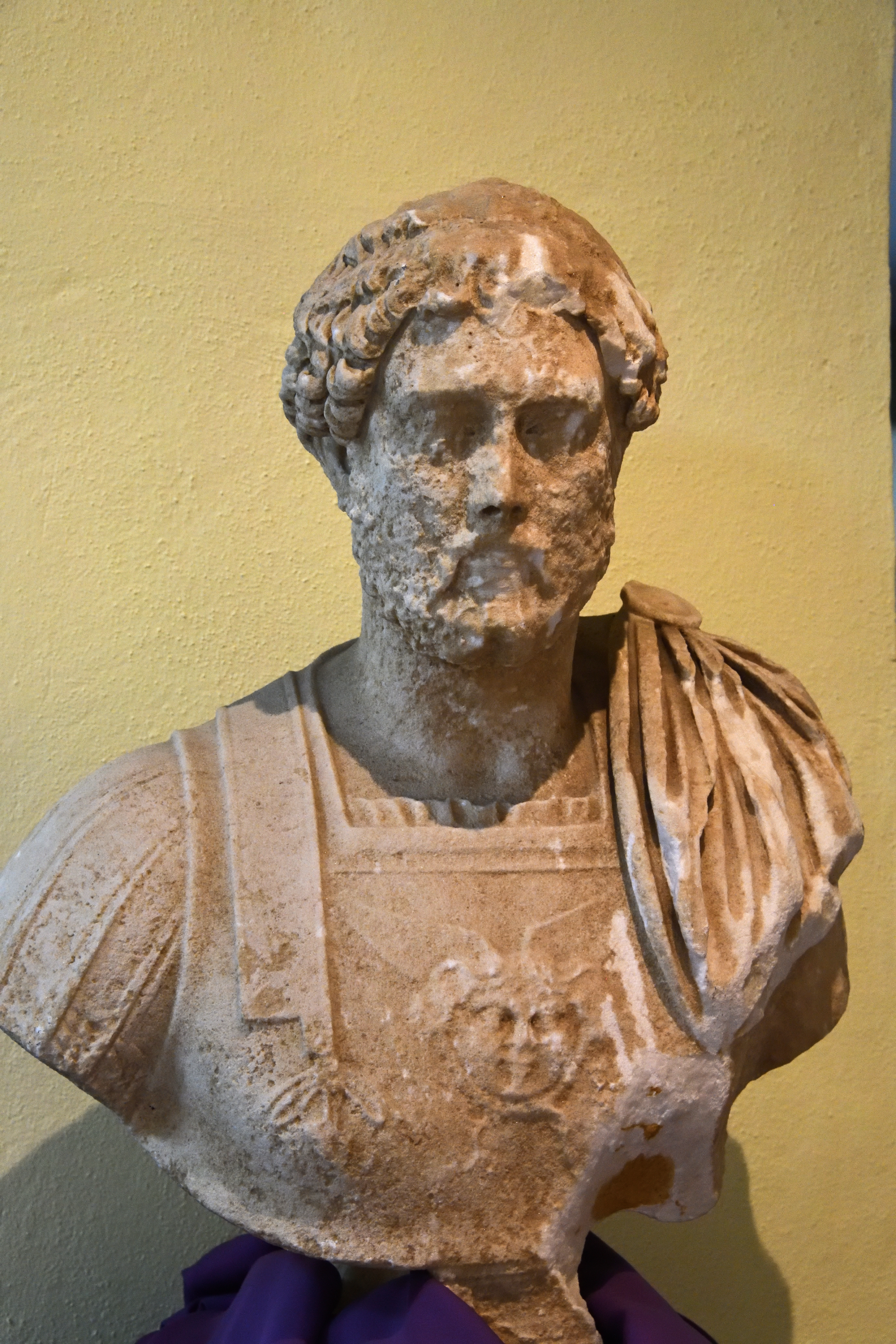
Bolu Museum Antoinius Pius bust

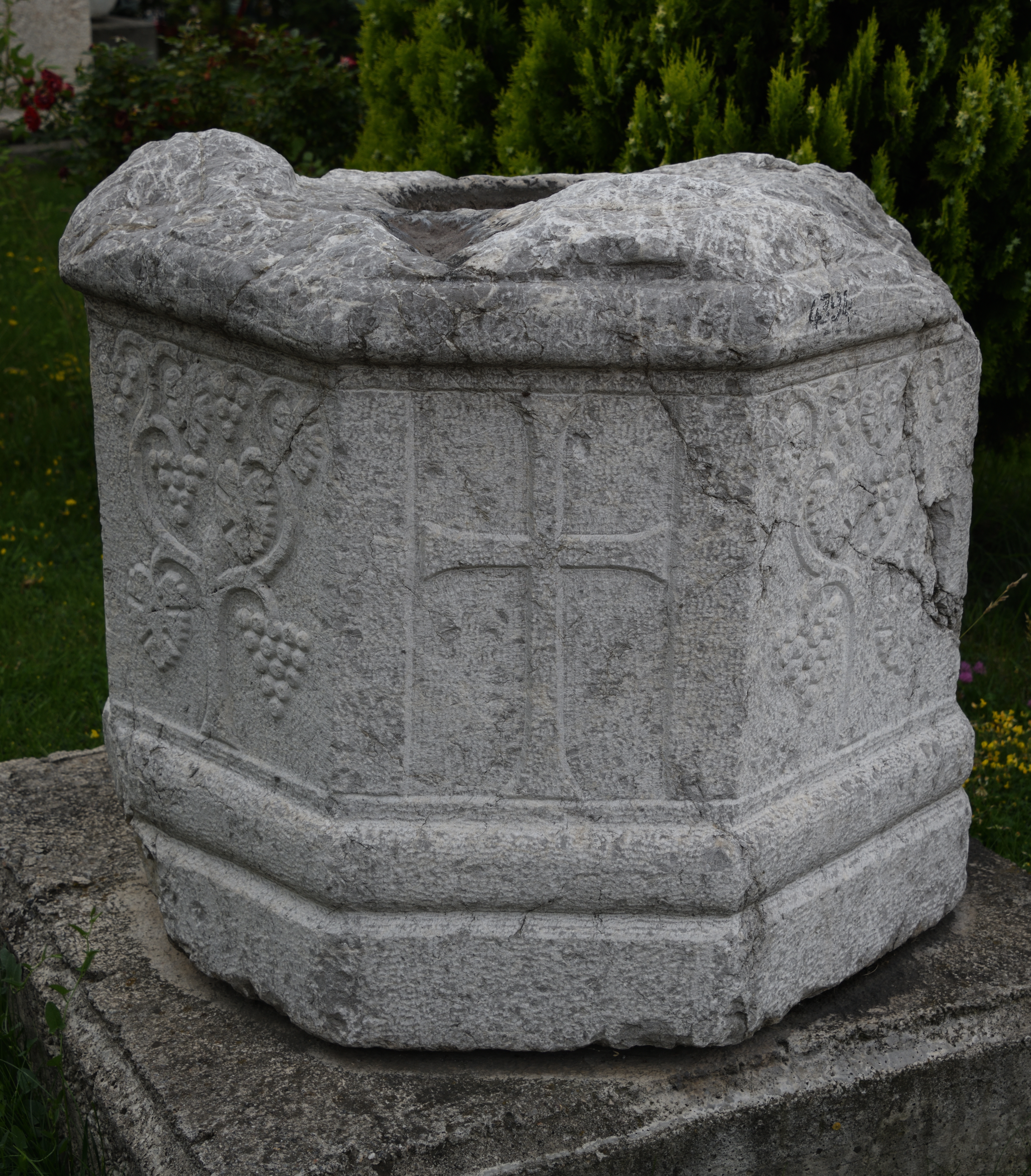
Bolu Museum Byzantine altar

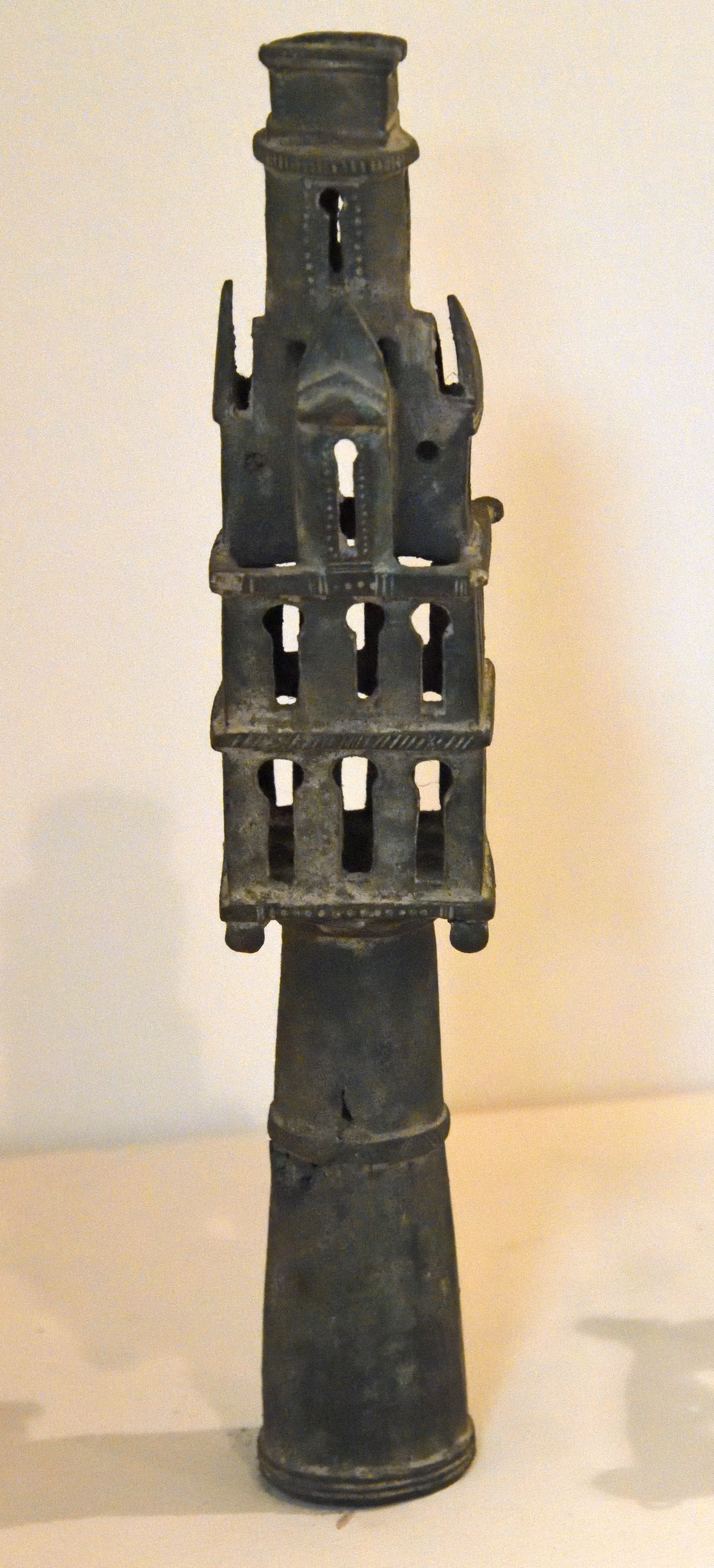
Bolu Museum Byzantine Standard

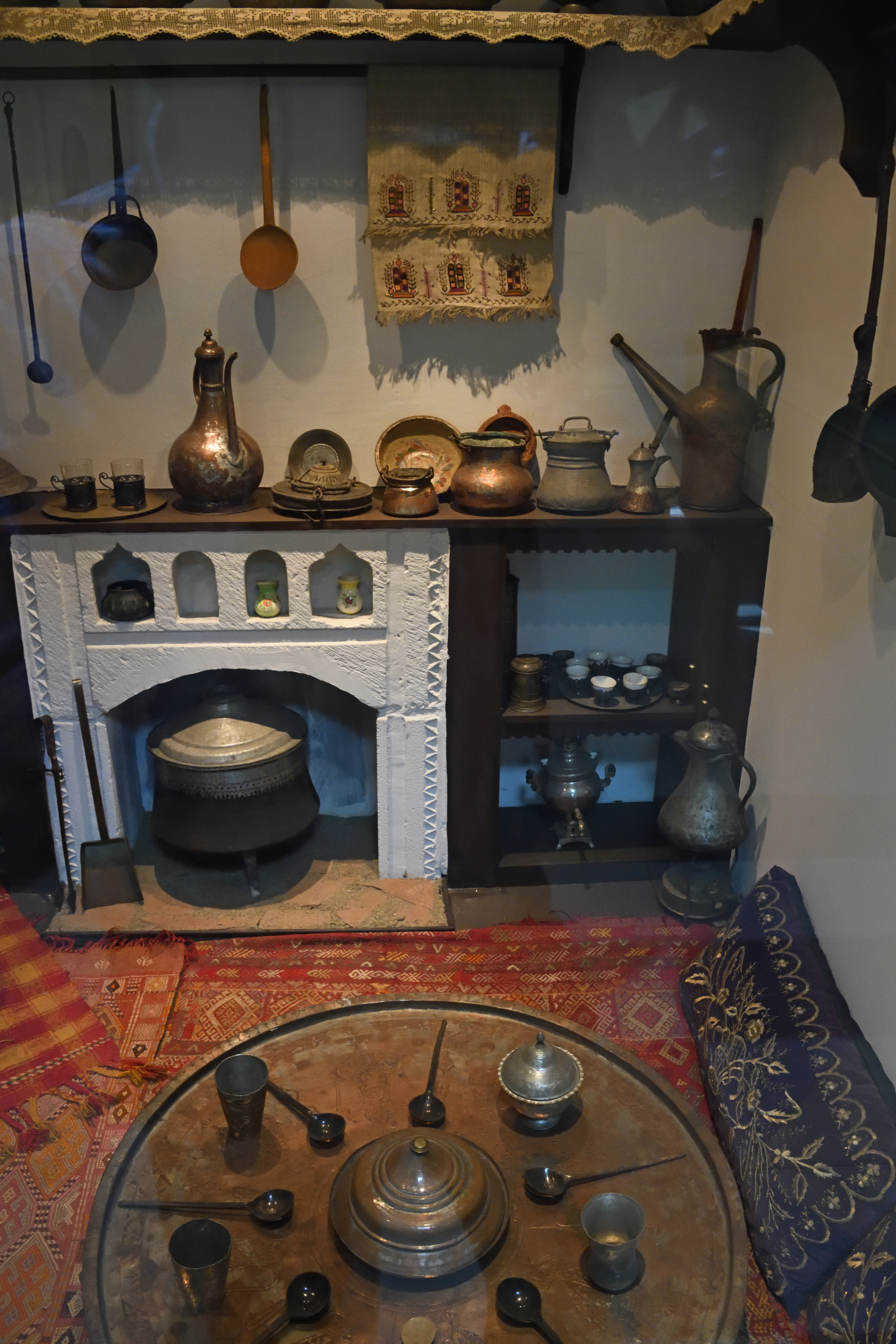
Bolu Museum Ethnography part Kitchen

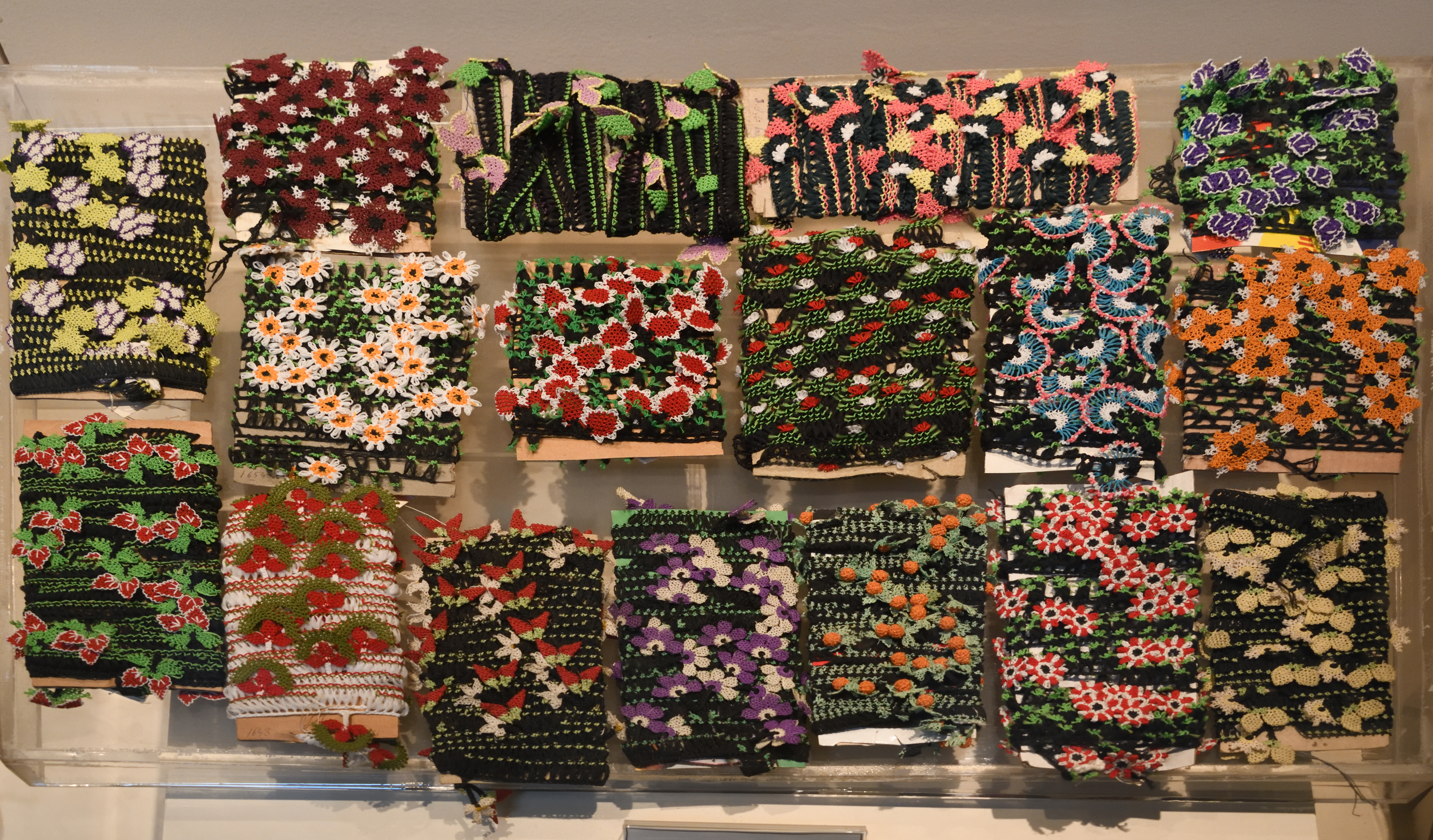
Bolu Museum Ethnography part
