= Aslahaddin Mosque =

Mosque in Bolu, Turkey

Aslahaddin Mosque (Turkish: Aslahaddin Camii) is a mosque in the Akpinar neighborhood of the city of Bolu, Turkey. It is named after Sayyid bin Abu Bakr, known as Hazrat Aslahaddin, whose turbe (tomb) is in the mosque.

According to the inscription found in his tomb, he came to Anatolia from Khorasan with 18,000 soldiers and was killed in the second part of the fortification during the siege of Bolu by the Muslims. The date of this event is shown in the district governor's office as 934 CE, 137 years before the Battle of Malazgirt. Historical documents reveal that the struggle to Islamize and Turkify Anatolia started earlier and was initiated by Ahmed Yesevi. Aslahuddin was of the Alperens who came to Anatolia in droves until the victory against the Eastern Roman Empire at the Battle of Manzikert in 1071 CE. Sayyid Aslahaddin and his companions constitute one of these raids.

The mosque underwent many restorations. The mausoleum was rebuilt in 1967 and the interior was decorated with Turkish tiles. It is often visited by sick and troubled women seeking his intercession with God.
