= Sena Elçin Karakaş =

Turkish trampoline gymnast (born 2004)

- Born: 10 November 2004 (age 21) Bornova, İzmir, Turkey

Gymnastics career
- Discipline: Trampoline gymnastics
- Country represented: Turkey
Medal record
Women's trampoline gymnastics
Representing Turkey
FIG World Cup
Gold medal – first place	2022 Baku	Synchro

Sena Elçin Karakaş (born 10 November 2004) is a Turkish trampoline gymnast. She competes in addition to individual event in the synchronized trampolining event.

== Early life ==
Sena Elçin Karakaş was born in Bornovaa district of İzmir on 10 November 2004.

She started with gymnastics after emulating her friend's participation in gymnastics at the age of five during the years she went to kindergarten. She had to persuaded first her mother and then her father. Her family entrusted her to coach İlhan Karanlık, who is still her coach. She went three days a week to gym, and had a lot of fun. She continued as her talent became evident.

She is a student at Çimentaş Anatolian High School in Bornova, İzmir.

== Sport career ==
In April 2018, she became runners-up at the AERE Trampoline Cup in Brescia, Italy with 49.435 points behind her country girl Livanur Yalçın.

She took the silver medal in the 15–16 year age group with 47.840 points behind Turkish Sıla Karakuş at the International Antalya Orange Cup in Turkey in September 2019.

Due to an injury, she was not able to take part at the 2021 European Trampoline Championships in Sochi, Russia in April. In November, she made it to the finals and finished fifth at the 2021 Trampoline Gymnastics World Championships in Baku, Azerbaijan.

In February 2022, she finished the Individual event at 14th place with 46.920 points, and captured the gold medal with her teammate Sıla Karakuş in the Synchro event with 44.140 points debuting in the Senior category and at the FIG World Cup in Baku, Azerbaijan.
