= Nonna Karakashyan =

Armenian chess player and coach

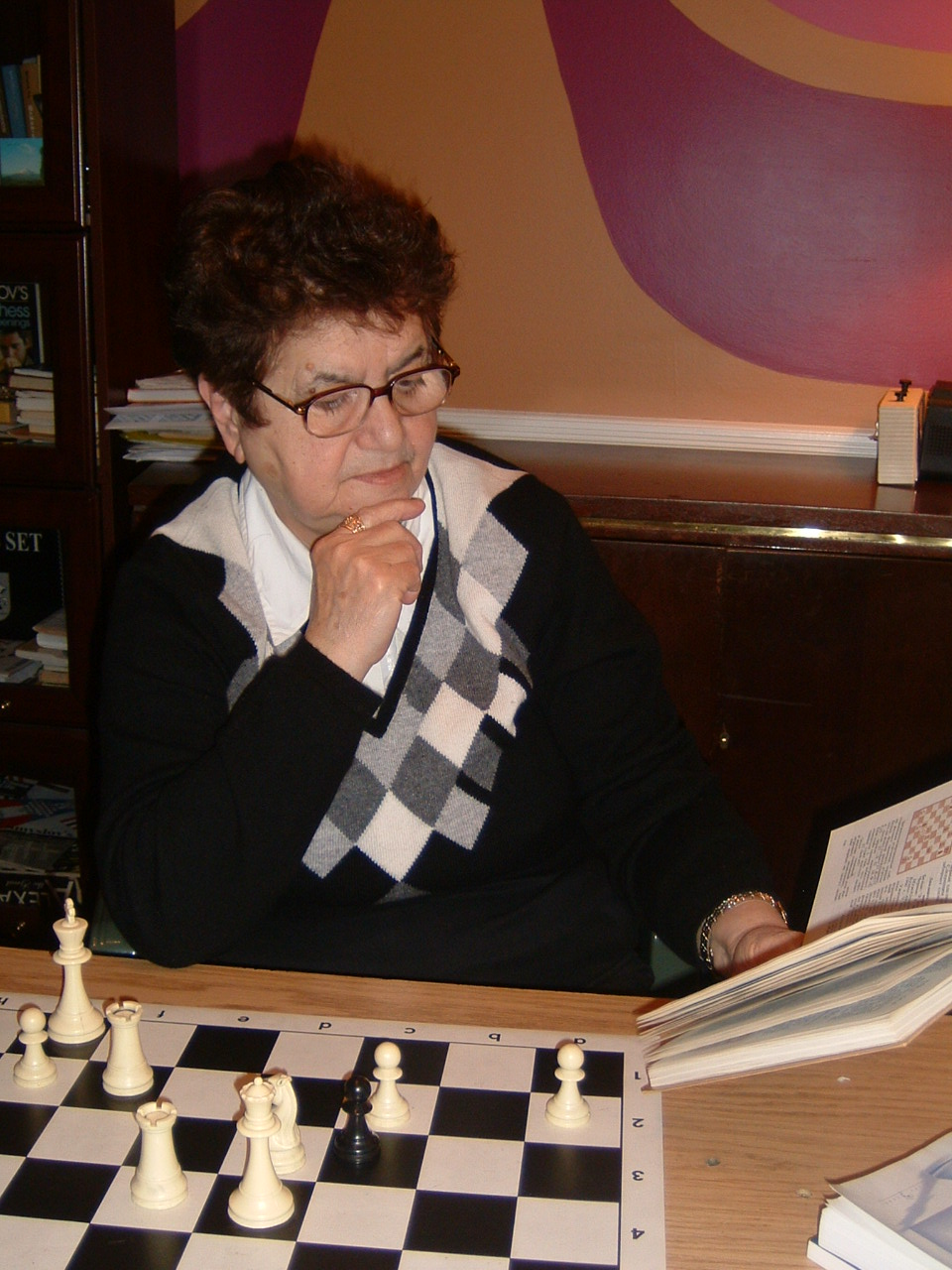
- Karakashyan in 2011

Personal information
- Born: Նոննա Կարակաշյան; February 13, 1940 (age 86) Baku, Azerbaijani SSR, Soviet Union

Chess career
- Country: Soviet Union → Armenia
- Title: International Arbiter (chess) (1992)

Nonna M. Karakashyan (Note: Her last name may also be spelled as Karakashian.) (née Nonna M. Avanesova; Armenian: Նոննա Կարակաշյան; born February 13, 1940) is an Armenian chess player and coach. She was awarded the FIDE title of International Arbiter in 1992, becoming the first woman from Armenia to do so.

== Education ==
Karakashyan was a student of Honoured Trainer Suren Abramian. She is a three-time Women's Chess Champion of Azerbaijan (1961, 1963, 1964) and national team member in 1955–1964. She holds a bachelor's degree in engineering.

== Career ==
In 1979, Karakashyan founded the "Trudovye Reservy" chess club in Baku, Azerbaijan, the first chess club in the USSR for students of vocational technical schools.

In 1991–1992, Karakashyan held the position of Deputy Director of the Executive Committee of the Armenian Chess Federation.

Karakashyan was Chief Arbiter of the finale tournament of the 51st USSR Women Open Championship (Lviv, Ukraine, 1991), arbiter of the Women World Candidate Tournament (Tskaltubo, Republic of Georgia, 1988), the World Chess Olympiads (Moscow, Russia, 1994 and Yerevan, Armenia, 1996) and several Tigran Petrosian Memorial Tournaments (1984–1991, Armenia).

Karakashyan teaches chess classes in Edison, New Jersey.

== Personal life ==
Her daughter, Narine Karakashian, is also a chess player, the first Armenian woman awarded with FIDE title of Woman International Master. Both mother and daughter were awarded with international chess titles (IA and WIM respectively) at the 1992 FIDE Congress in Manila, Philippines.

== Publications ==
- «Trainer who was a Role Model…» (2000), memoirs about Suren Abramian originally published at КasparovChess.ru /in Russian/
- Շախմատաին Հայաստան / «Шахматная Армения» / Chess in Armenia magazine – articles (1983–1992) /in Armenian and Russian/
- «Голос Армении» / Voice of Armenia newspaper – chess columnist (1983–1992) /in Russian/.
