= Narine Karakashian =

Armenian chess player (born 1971)

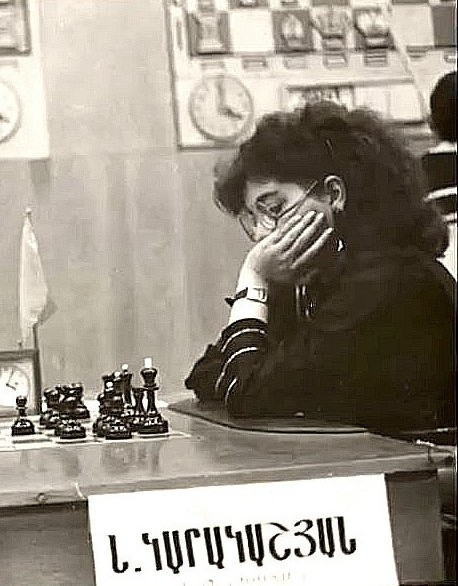
- Karakashian in 1989

Personal information
- Born: 30 June 1971 (age 55)

Chess career
- Country: Armenia
- Title: Woman International Master (1992)
- Peak rating: 2200 (January 1992)

Narine Karakashian (Armenian: Նարինե Կարակաշյան; born 30 June 1971) is an Armenian chess player She was awarded the FIDE title of Woman International Master (WIM) in 1992, becoming the first woman from Armenia to do so. She also has PhD in Psychology.

== Career ==
Karakashian competed at the 30th Chess Olympiad for Armenia. She also represented the Armenian SSR at the 2nd Soviet Women's Team Chess Championship 1991.

== Personal life ==
Her mother is Nonna Karakashyan, who was also a chess player and the first Armenian woman awarded with FIDE title of International Arbiter. Both mother and daughter were awarded with International chess titles (IA and WIM, correspondingly) at the same FIDE Congress in Manila, Philippines in 1992.
