= Karakashly =

- Location within Azerbaijan
- Coordinates: 39°34′14″N 49°00′21″E
- Country: Azerbaijan
- Rayon: Salyan
- Time zone: UTC+4 (AZT)
  - Summer (DST): UTC+5 (AZT)

Karakashly is a village in the Salyan Rayon of Azerbaijan.
