= Bolu =

- Municipality
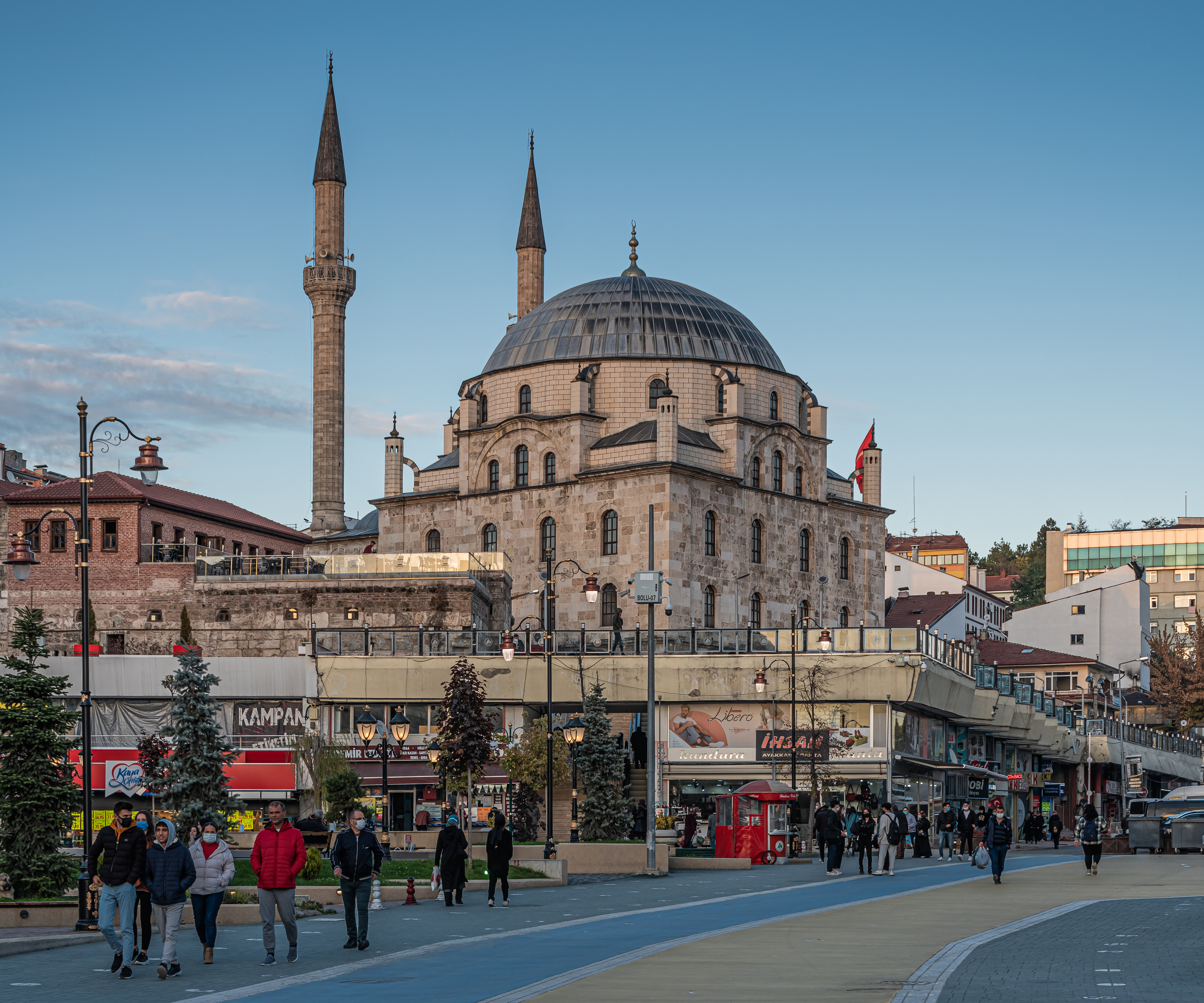
- Beyazıt Mosque in Bolu city center

- Coat of arms

- Location within Turkey
- Coordinates: 40°44′05″N 31°36′27″E
- Country: Turkey
- Province: Bolu
- District: Bolu

Government
  - Mayor: Tanju Özcan (CHP)
- Elevation: 726 m (2,382 ft)
- Population (2021): 184,682
- Time zone: UTC+3 (TRT)
- Website: www.bolu.bel.tr

Bolu is a city in northern Turkey, and administrative center of the Bolu Province and of Bolu District, located on the highway between Istanbul and Ankara. Its population as of 2021 was 184,682.

The city has been governed by mayor Tanju Özcan (CHP) since local elections in 2019. It was the site of Ancient Claudiopolis and has also been called Eskihisar ("old fortress") (and as such has several Turkish namesakes).

The old highway (D-100) between Ankara and Istanbul climbs over Mount Bolu, while the new motorway (E-80) passes through Mount Bolu Tunnel, a little distance from the town. It is situated at 742 m (2,434 ft) above sea level on the southern slopes of a bare hill.

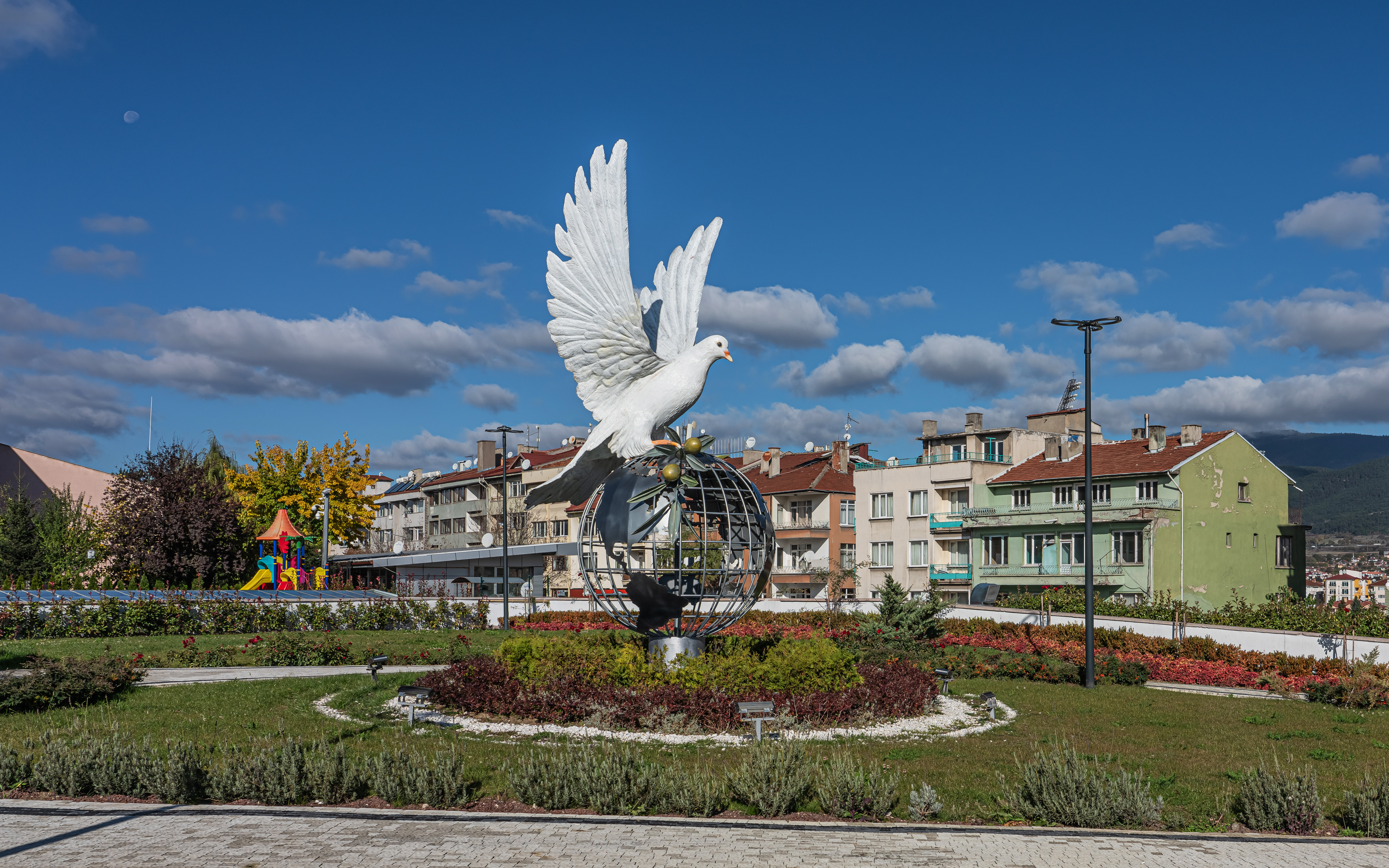
Sculpture of the Peace Dove at the town hall

== History ==
=== Antiquity ===
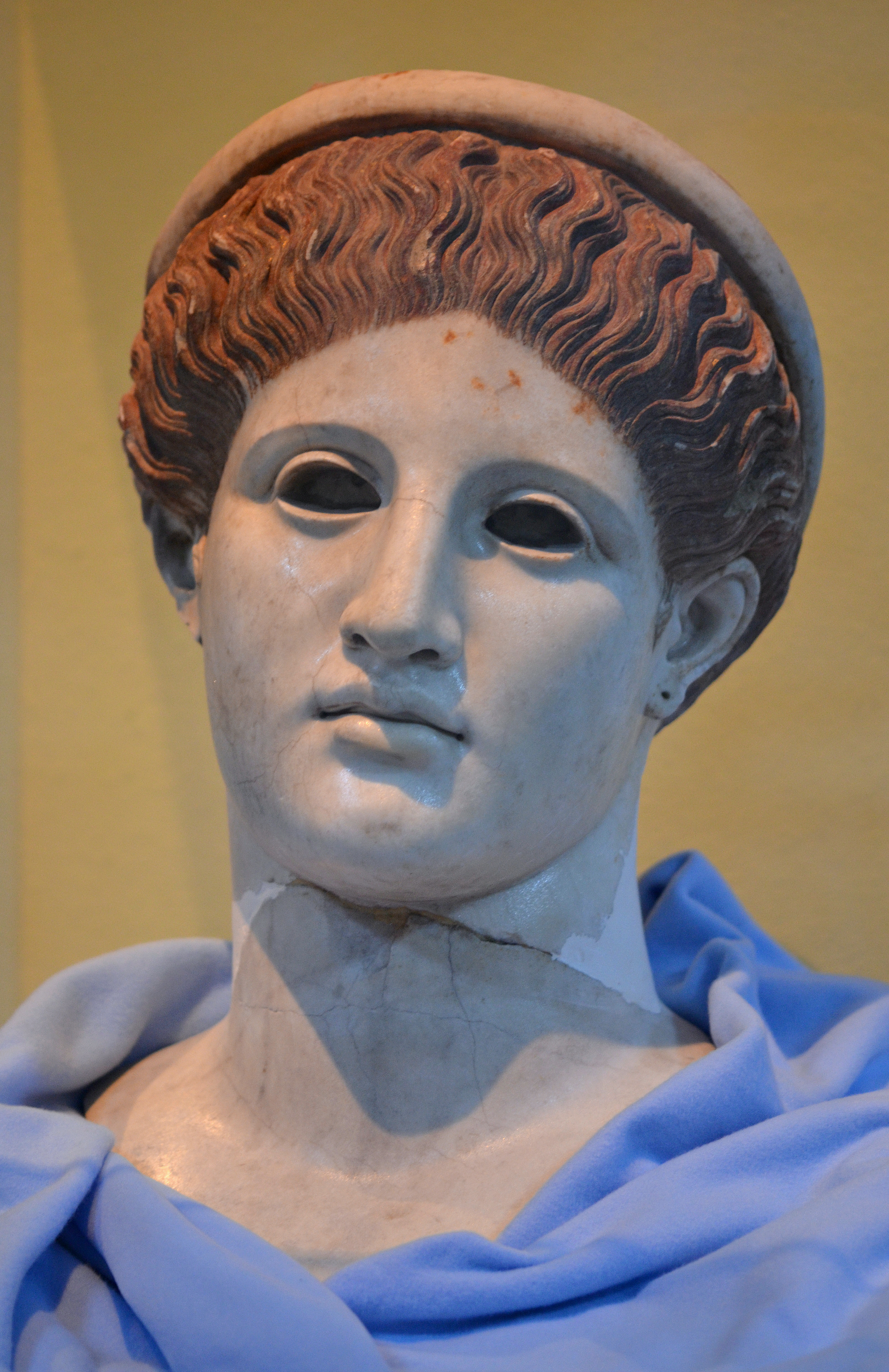
The statue from Antonine Dynasty period, 2nd century AD, of crystalline white marble and stems from Bithynia - Claudiopolis in Bolu Museum

Bolu was part of one of the Hittite kingdoms around 2000 BC and later 500 BC became one of the leading cities of the Greek Kingdom of Bithynia (279 BC - 79 BC). Bebryces, Mariandynes, Koukones, Thyns and Paphlagons are native people of the area in antique era. Strabo (XII, 4, 7) mentions a Hellenistic town, Bithynium (Greek: Βιθύνιον), celebrated for its pastures and cheese, which according to Pausanias (VIII, 9) was founded by Arcadians from Mantinea.

In the Ancient Roman era, as is shown by its coins, the town was commonly called Claudiopolis (Greek: Κλαυδιούπολις) after Emperor Claudius. It was the birthplace of Antinous, the posthumously deified lover of the Roman Emperor Hadrian, who was very generous to the city, and his name was later added to that of Claudius on the coins of the city. Emperor Theodosius II (408-50) made it the capital of a new province, formed out of Bithynia and Paphlagonia, and called by him Honorias in honour of his younger son and successor Honorius. The town was also known as Hadriana during the late Roman period.

=== Middle Ages ===
During the Byzantine period, the city continued to be referred to as Claudiopolis. After the Battle of Manzikert in 1071, in which the Byzantine Empire suffered a defeat against the Seljuks, Turkomans migrating west occupied the city. It was recaptured by the Byzantines in 1097, and became a frontier town during the Komnenian period. Torwards the end of 1179, the Turks laid siege to Claudiopolis, attempting to starve its inhabitants, but emperor Manuel I Komnenos rapidly moved to the area, causing the Turks to abandon the siege and flee. According to Niketas Choniates:

Manuel, unwilling to wait for news of disaster, rose up the next day and set out for Claudiopolis as fast as possible via Nikomedia. He took with him none of the royal luxuries—not even royal pavilion, bed, or mattress—but only the horse trappings and armor woven of chain mail. He extended the distance of the day's march in his eagerness to reach the besieged before they should suffer dangers beyond description. [..] The barbarians positioned about Claudiopolis caught sight of him as he approached, first aware of his arrival from the military standards of his divisions and the radiant splendor of their arms, and forthwith took flight.

After the fall of the Komnenian dynasty, Claudiopolis was conquered by the Sultanate of Rum at some point before 1214, and began to be referred to as Boli, short for the Greek Polis.

=== Ottoman period ===
In 1325, the town was conquered by the Ottoman Empire under Orhan, becoming known under the present Turkish name - sometimes called Bolou or Boli. It was also ruled by Candaroğlu between 1402 and 1423. It became the chief town of a sanjak in the vilayet (province) of Kastamonu and had a population of 10,000 inhabitants. Bolu was an Ottoman eyalet (state) until the Charter of States (Vilayetler Nizannamesi) of 1864, and was within the area stretching from Beykoz kazasi of İzmid sanjak to Boyabat kazasi of Sinop sanjak. In the late 19th and early 20th century, following the 1864 Vilayetler Nizannamesi, Bolu was part of the Kastamonu Vilayet of the Empire.

== Ecclesiastical history ==
=== (Arch)Bishopric ===
As secular capital of the Roman province of Honorias, in the civil Diocese of Pontus, the bishopric of Claudiopolis became the metropolitan see, in the sway of the Patriarchate of Constantinople, with five suffragan sees: Heraclea Pontica, Prusias ad Hypium, Tium, Cratia and Hadrianopolis in Honoriade. It appears as such in the Notitiae Episcopatuum of Pseudo-Epiphanius of about 640 and in that of Byzantine Emperor Leo VI the Wise of the early 10th century, ranking sixteenth viz. seventeenth among the Patriarchate's Metropolitans. In the late 13th century, during the reign of Andronikos II, Claudiopolis lost its metropolitan dignity to Heraclea Pontica. It ceased to exist as a residential bishopric in the 15th century.

Michel Lequien mentions twenty bishops of the see to the 13th century; documentary mentions are available for the following incumbent (arch)bishops:

- the first is St. Autonomus, said to be an Italian missionary who suffered martyrdom under Diocletian.
- Callicrates (mentioned in 363 in Socrates Scholasticus' church history)
- Gerontius (first actual historically documented bishop, in 394 attending the council against Metropolitan Bagadius of Bosra.
- Olympius (in 431)
- Calogerus (449 - 458)
- Carterius (mentioned in 459)
  - Hypatus (circa 518) [dismissed by Janin]
- Epictetus (in 536)
  - Vincentius (in 553) [dismissed by Janin]
- Cyprianus I (in 680)
  - Janin also includes a bishop Sisinnius, attending the council in Trullo (692), but apparently assigns the same to namesake see Claudiopolis in Isauria
- Nicetas I (in 787)
- Ignatius, a friend and correspondent of Patriarch Photios I of Constantinople
- Cyprianus II (869 – 879)
- Nicetas II (10th–11th centuries)
- John (1028 - 1029).

=== Titular see ===
The archdiocese was nominally restored by the Roman Catholic Church as a Latin Metropolitan titular archbishopric no later than the seventeenth century, first named Claudiopolis (Latin) / Claudiopoli (Curiate Italian), renamed in 1933 as Claudiopolis in Honoriade (Latin) / Claudiopoli di Onoriade (Italiano) / Claudiopolitan(us) in Honoriade (Latin).

It has been held by:

- Alfredo Bruniera (1954.12.12 – 2000.03.26)
- Alain Guynot de Boismenu, Sacred Heart Missionaries (M.S.C.) (1945.01.18 – 1953.11.05)
- Georges-Prudent-Marie Bruley des Varannes (1924.02.13 – 1943.05.29)
- Giuseppe Fiorenza (1905.12.11 – 1924.01.27)
- Giovanni Battista Bertagna (1901.03.26 – 1905.02.11)
- Joseph-Adolphe Gandy, M.E.P. (1889.01.15 – 1892.09.29)
- Eugène-Jean-Claude-Joseph Desflèches (范若瑟), Paris Foreign Missions Society (M.E.P.) (1883.02.20 – 1887.11.07)
- Carlo Gigli (1880.12.13 – 1881.08.24)
- Stephanus Antonius Aucher (1796.07.05 – ?)
- Tommaso Battiloro (1767.11.20 – 1767.12.14)
- Titular Bishop: Joannes Nicastro (1724.09.11 – ?)
- Titular Bishop: Walenty Konstantyn Czulski (1721.02.12 – 1724.02.10?)
- Titular Bishop: Piotr Tarło (1713.01.30 – 1720.12.16)
- Jean-Baptiste Adhémar de Monteil de Grignan (1667.08.03 – 1689.03.09)
- Titular Bishop: Tomás de Paredes, Augustinians (O.E.S.A.) (1652.10.14 – 1667.02.17)

== Places of interest ==
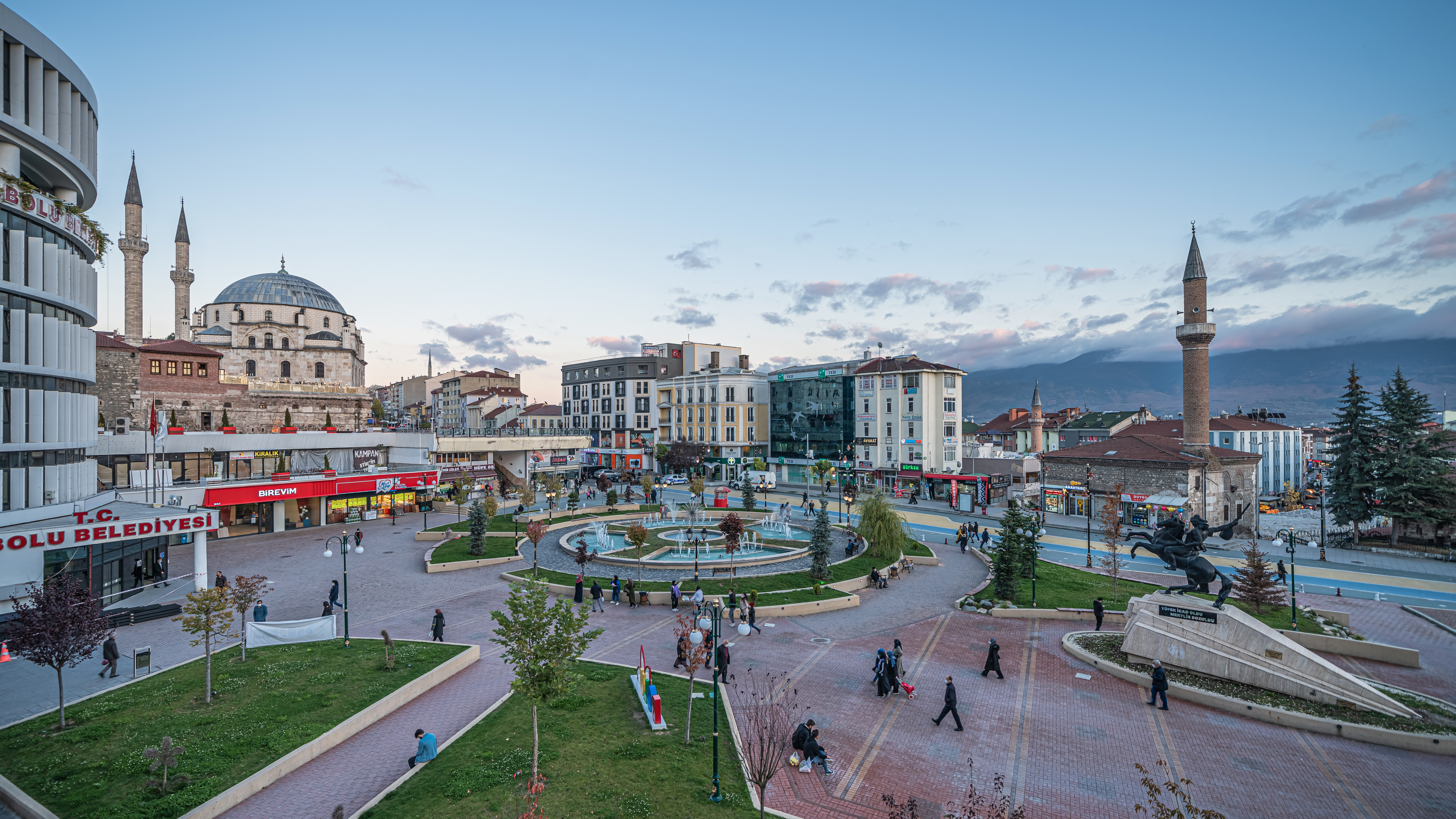
Panoramic view of the municipality square

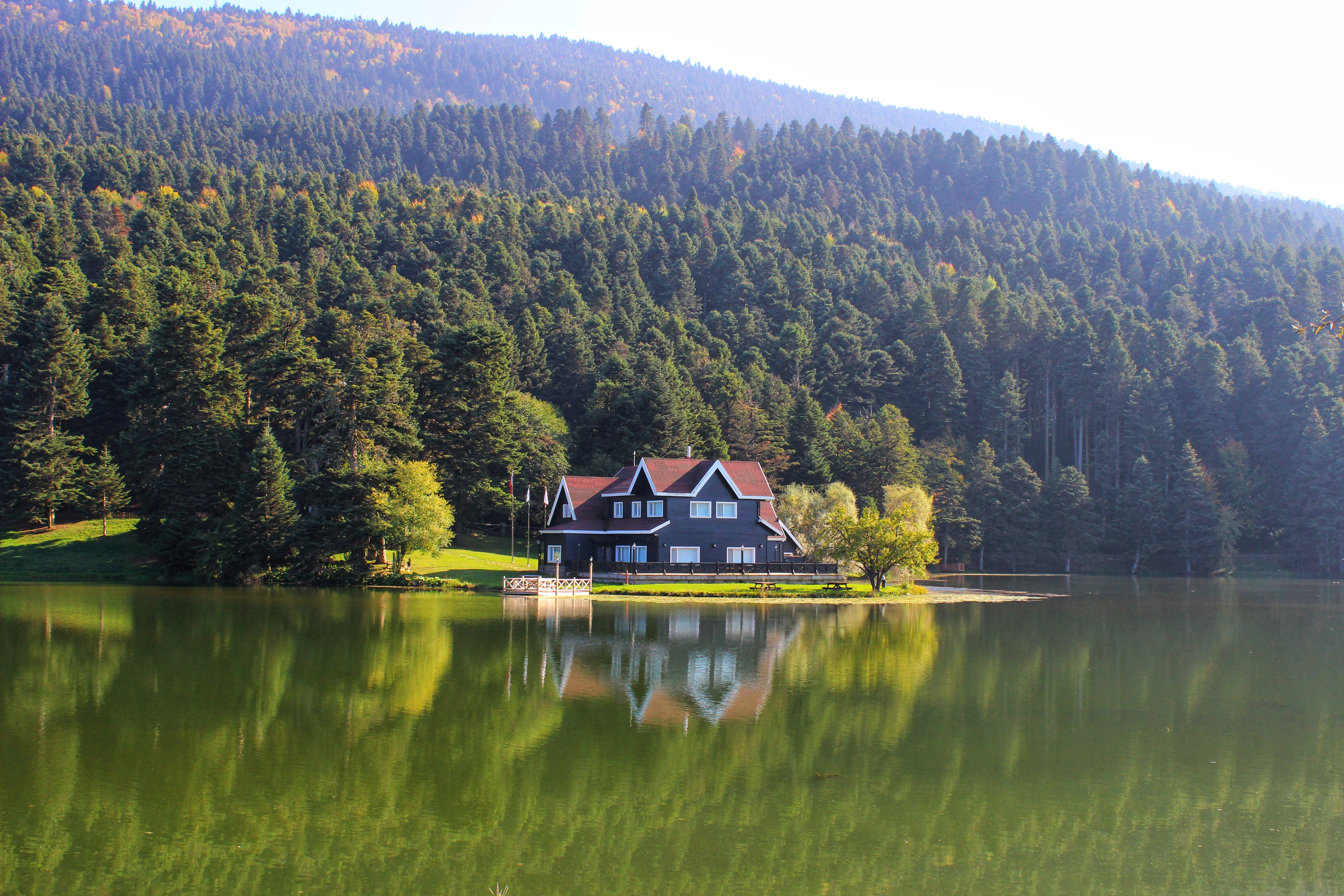
Lake Gölcük is a popular tourist destination

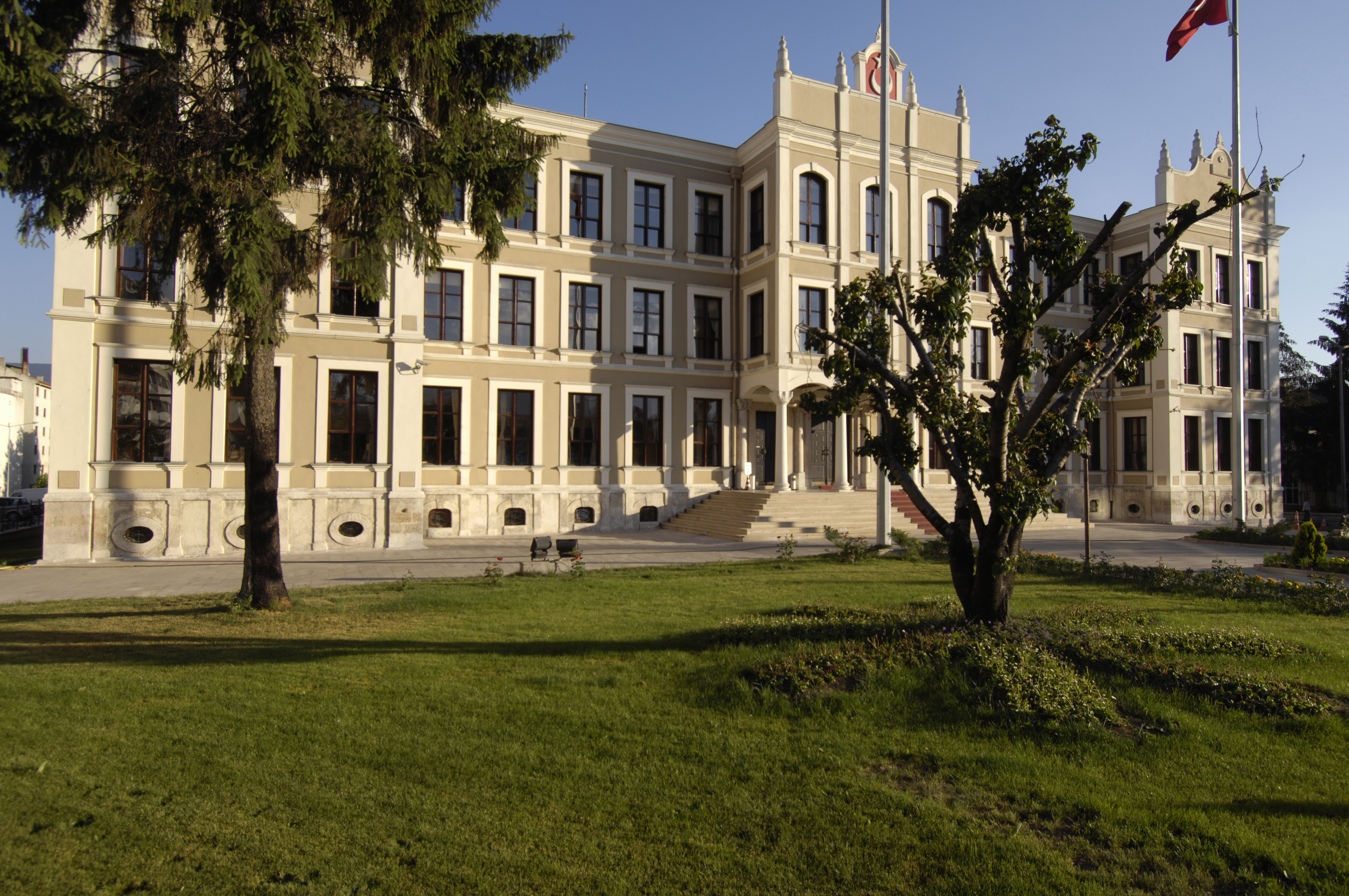
Bolu Governorship

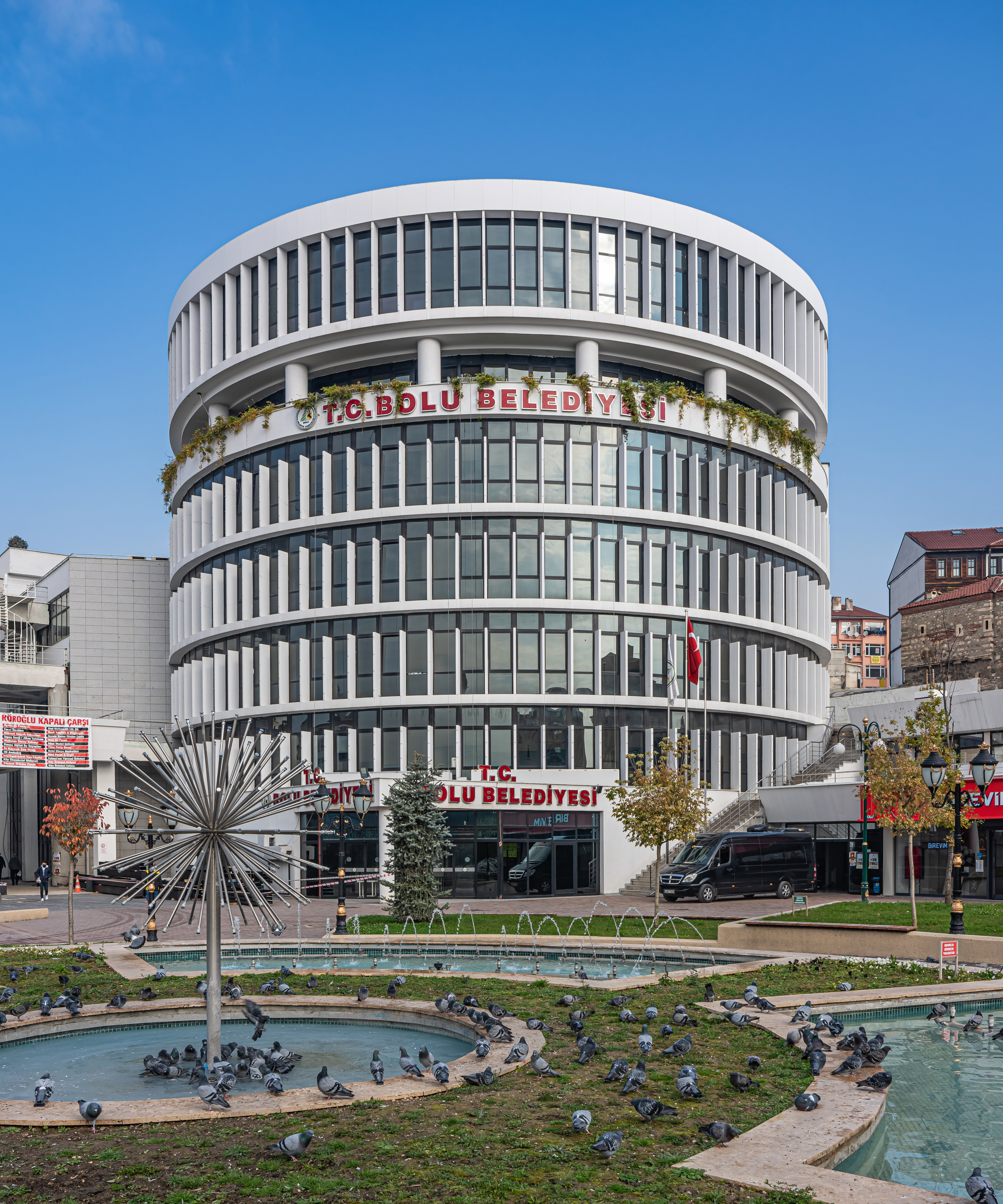
Town hall or municipality building in the city center

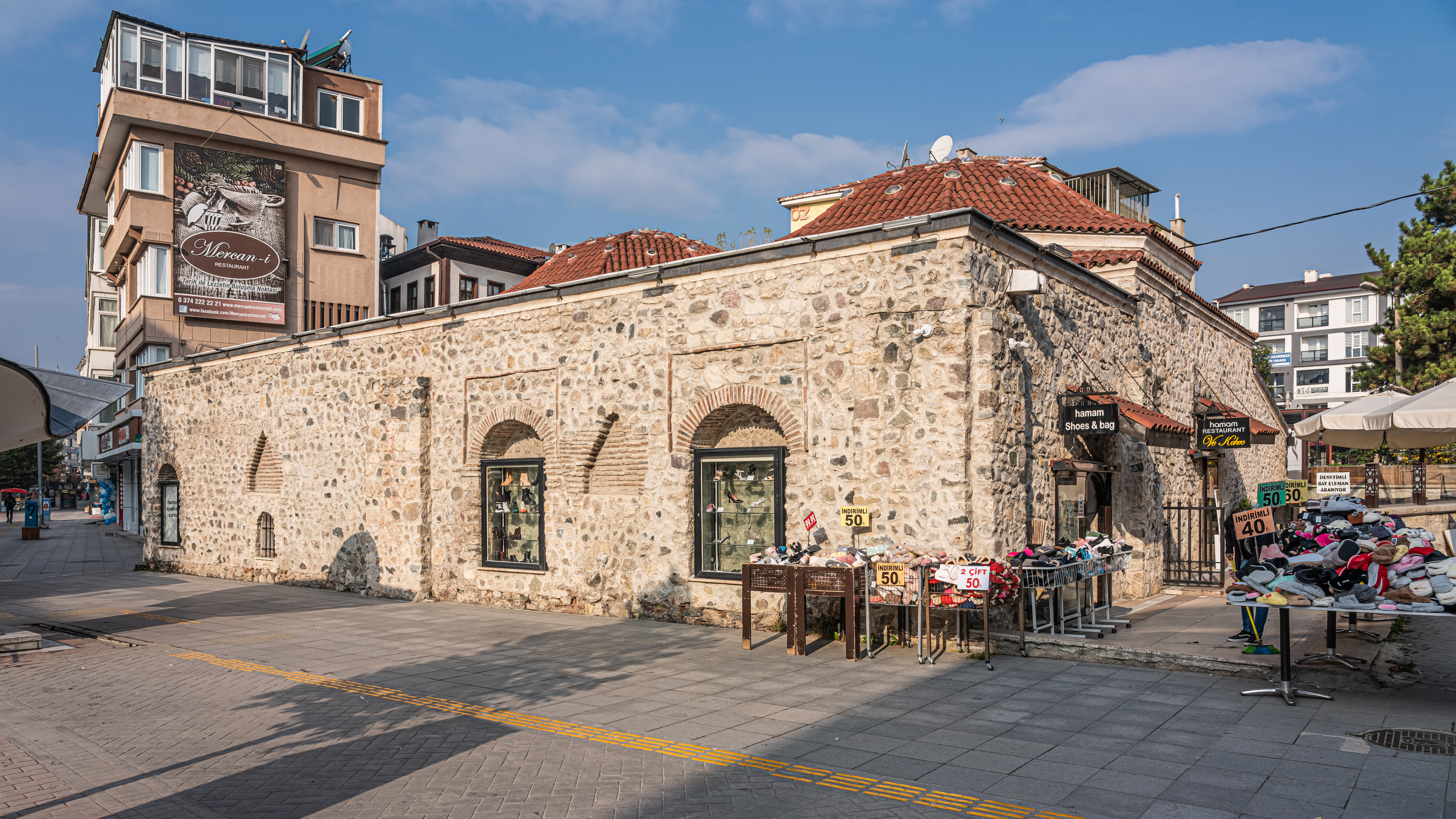
A former hammam building, now used as a shoe shop and a restaurant in the city center

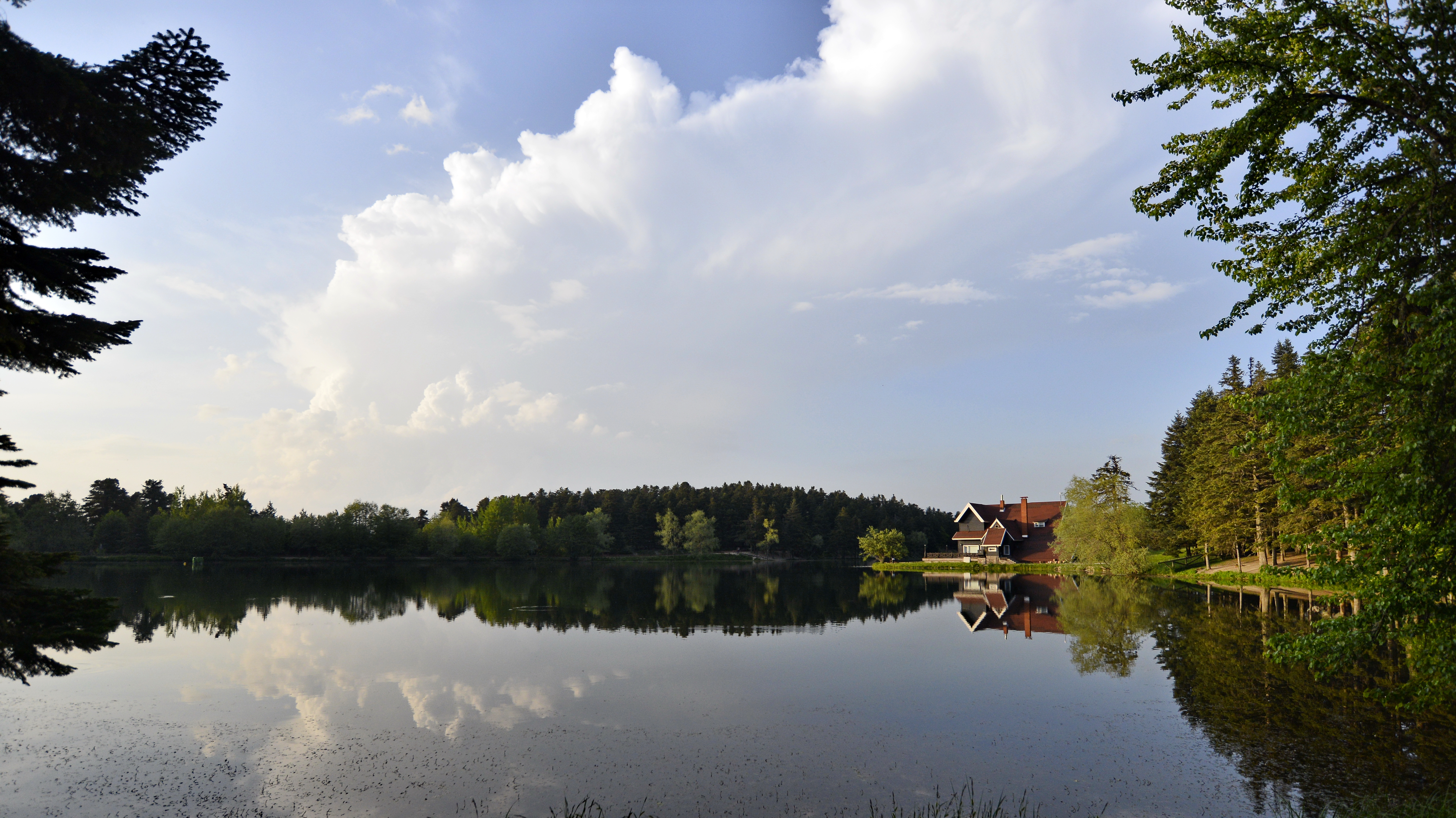
Lake Abant Nature Park is the most popular tourism destination near Bolu

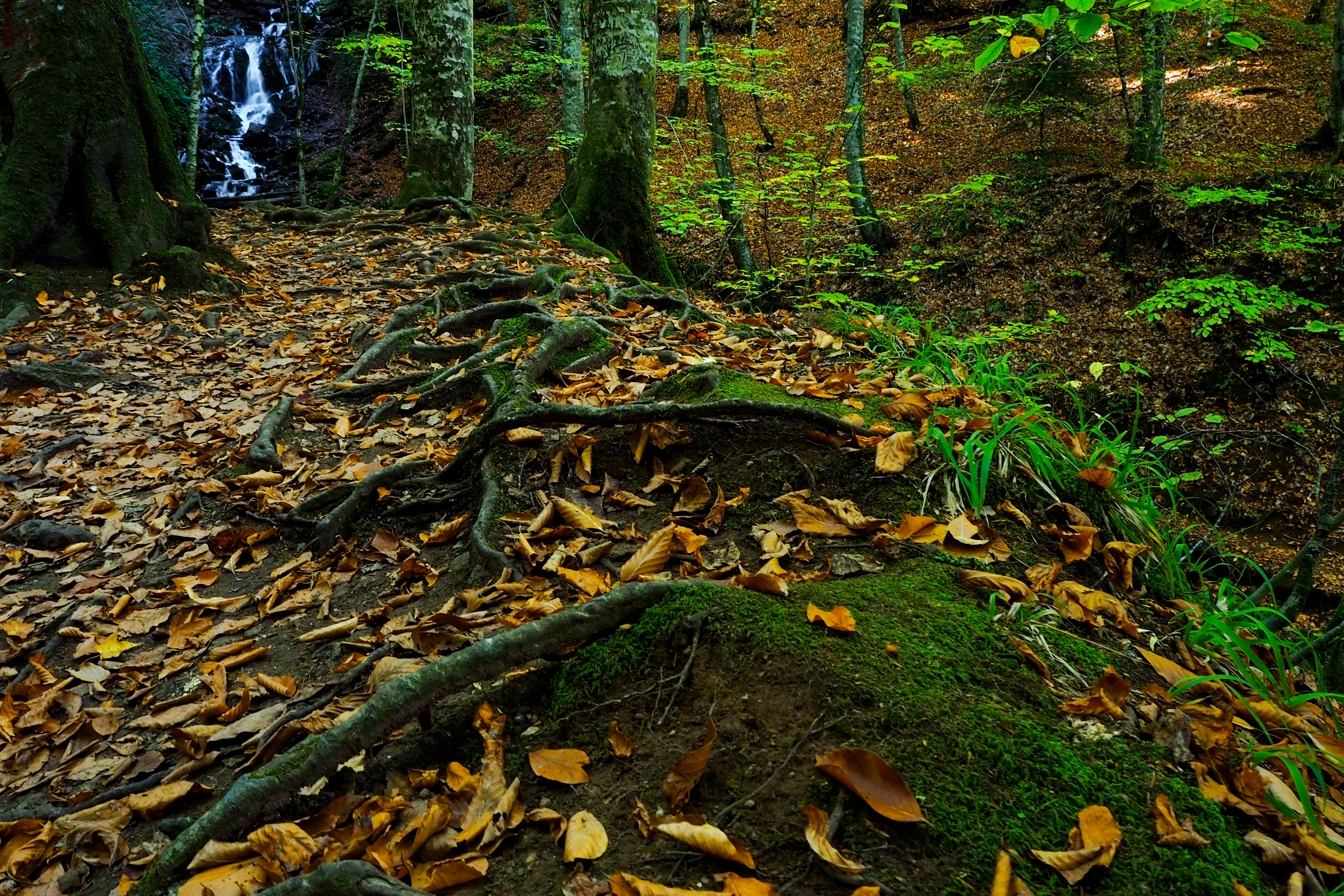
Wildlife within Yedigöller National Park includes, but is not limited to, red deer, roe deer, wild boar, brown bears, wolves, red fox, lynx, jungle cats, otters and squirrels

The countryside around Bolu offers excellent walking and other outdoor pursuits. There are hotels in the town. Sights near the town include:

- The 14th-century grand mosque, Yıldırım Bayezid Camii (C pronounced as J).
- Bolu Museum holding artifacts from Hittite, Roman, Byzantine, Seljuk and Ottoman periods.
- The hot springs, Kaplıcalar.
- Lake Abant and village of Gölköy, near the university campus.
- The famous volcanic crater lake called Gölcük.
- Hayreddin-i Tokadi, the local saint whose shrine is visited by folk in an annual festival and on Eid holidays.
- Yedigöller National Park
- Aslahaddin Mosque, where an early Muslim martyr rests
- The ruins of the ancient stadion of Claudiopolis
- Bolu Kartalkaya ski resort

== Culture ==
=== Architecture and sights ===
Bolu is home to examples of Ottoman architecture. The Bayezid Grand Mosque dates to 1899, commissioned by Sultan Abdul Hamid II, but was originally built by Bayezid the Thunderbolt and is home to decorations that resemble embroideries. The Kadı Mosque is perhaps the best example of classical Ottoman architecture in the city, having been built in 1499 and having its entrance embroidered with ornate kündekari works. Other Ottoman mosques in the city include the İmaret Mosque, built in the 16th century, Saraçhane Mosque, built in 1750, Ilıca Mosque, built in 1510–11, Karaköy Cuma Mosque, built in 1562-63 and Tabaklar Mosque, built in 1897.

The remains of the ancient city of Bithynium have been found in four hills in the city centre, Kargatepe, Hisartepe, Hıdırlıktepe and the Uğurlunaip Hill. In Hıdırlıktepe, a tomb and the remains of a theatre have been uncovered. In Hisartepe, a temple believed to have been built by the Roman emperor Hadrian for his lover Antinous has been excavated. In 1911, it was noted that "in and around [Bolu] are numerous marbles with Greek inscriptions, chiefly sepulchral, and architectural fragments."

Bolu Museum was established in 1975 to display and protect artifacts found in the Bolu area. It functions as both an archaeological and an ethnographic museum and is home to 3286 archaeological and 1677 ethnographic artifacts, as well as 12,095 historical coins. The archaeological artifacts chronicle the history of the area from Neolithic to Byzantine eras.

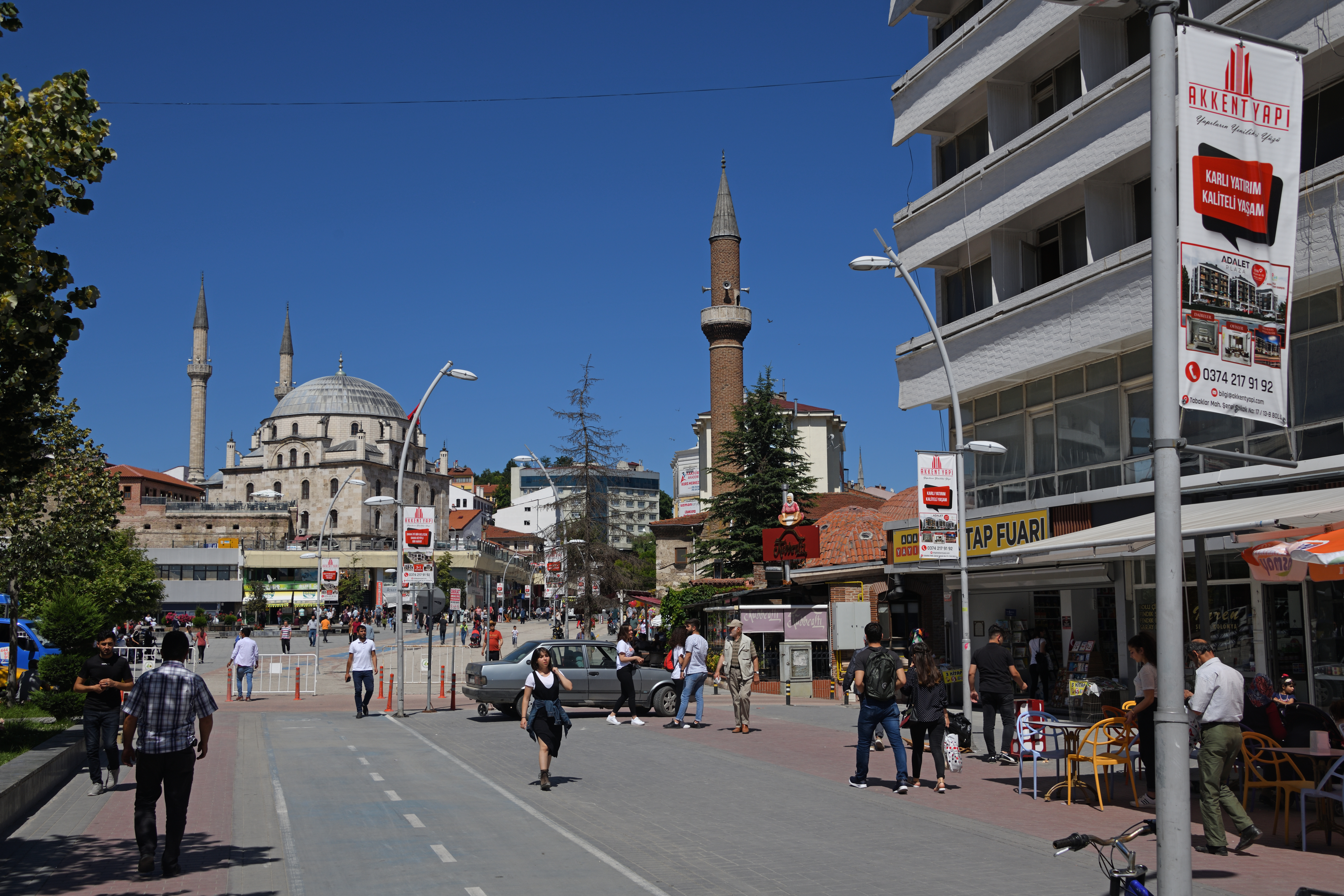
Bolu Izzet Baysal Street

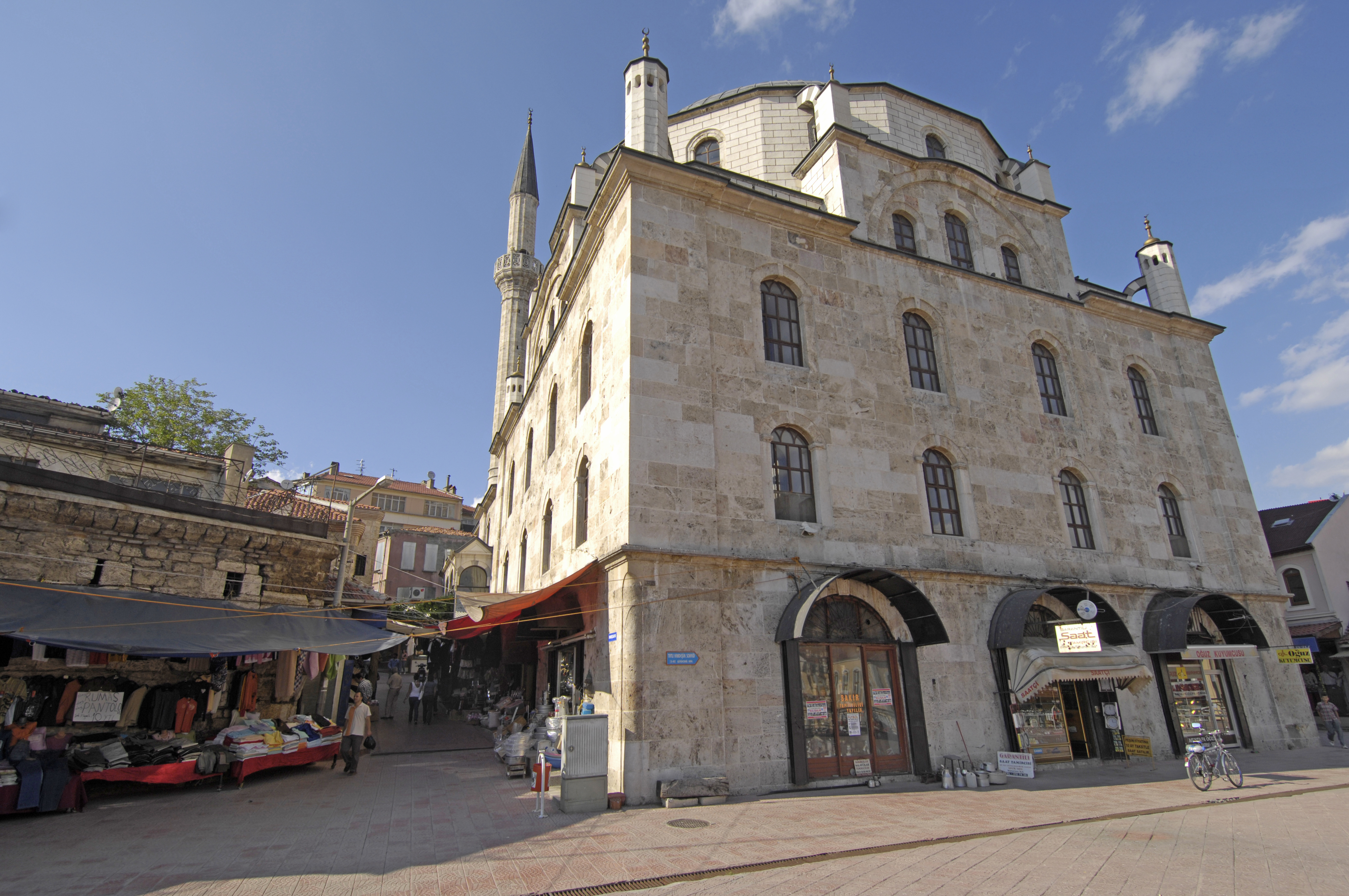
Bolu Lower Tashhan and Bayezid Mosque

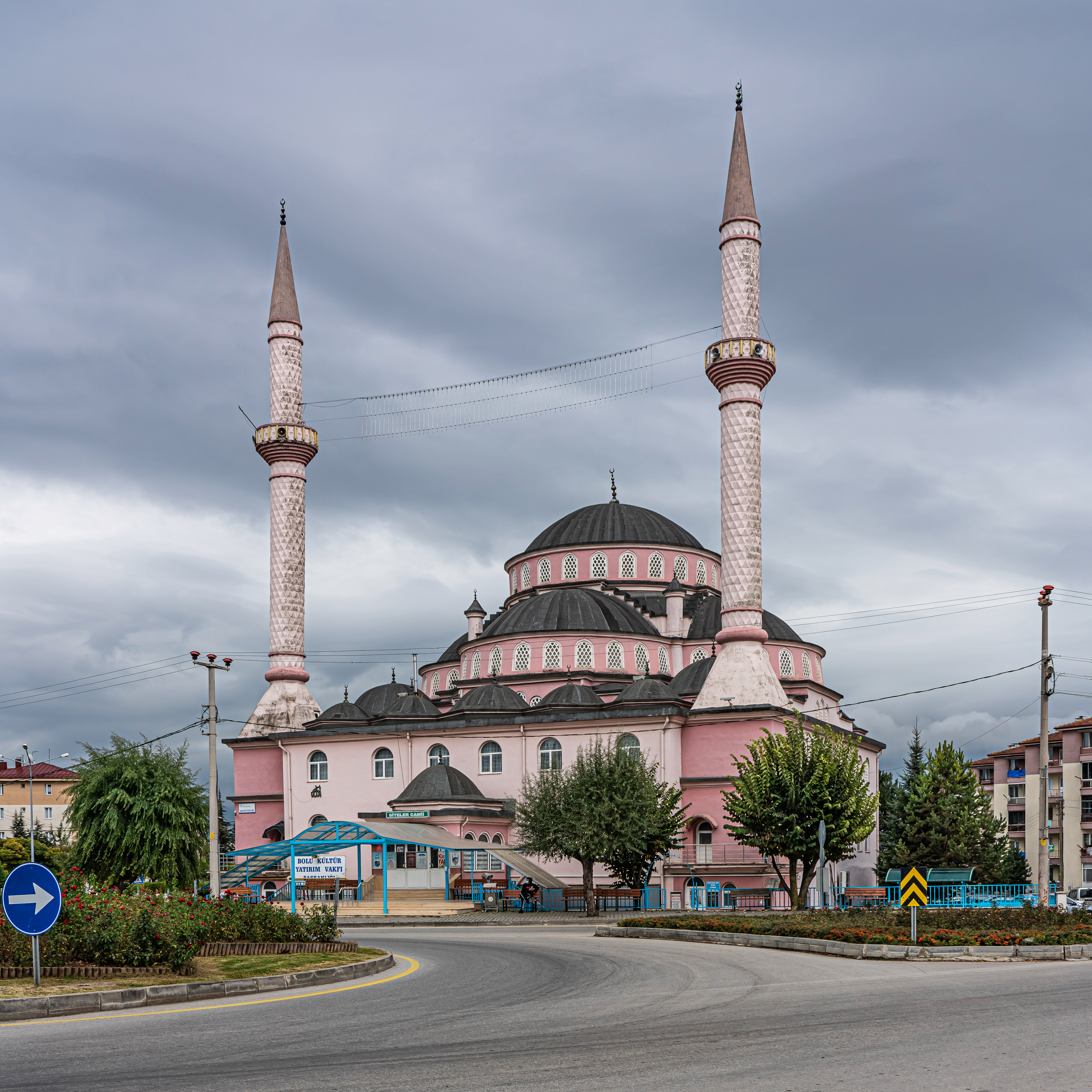
Bolu Siteler Mosque

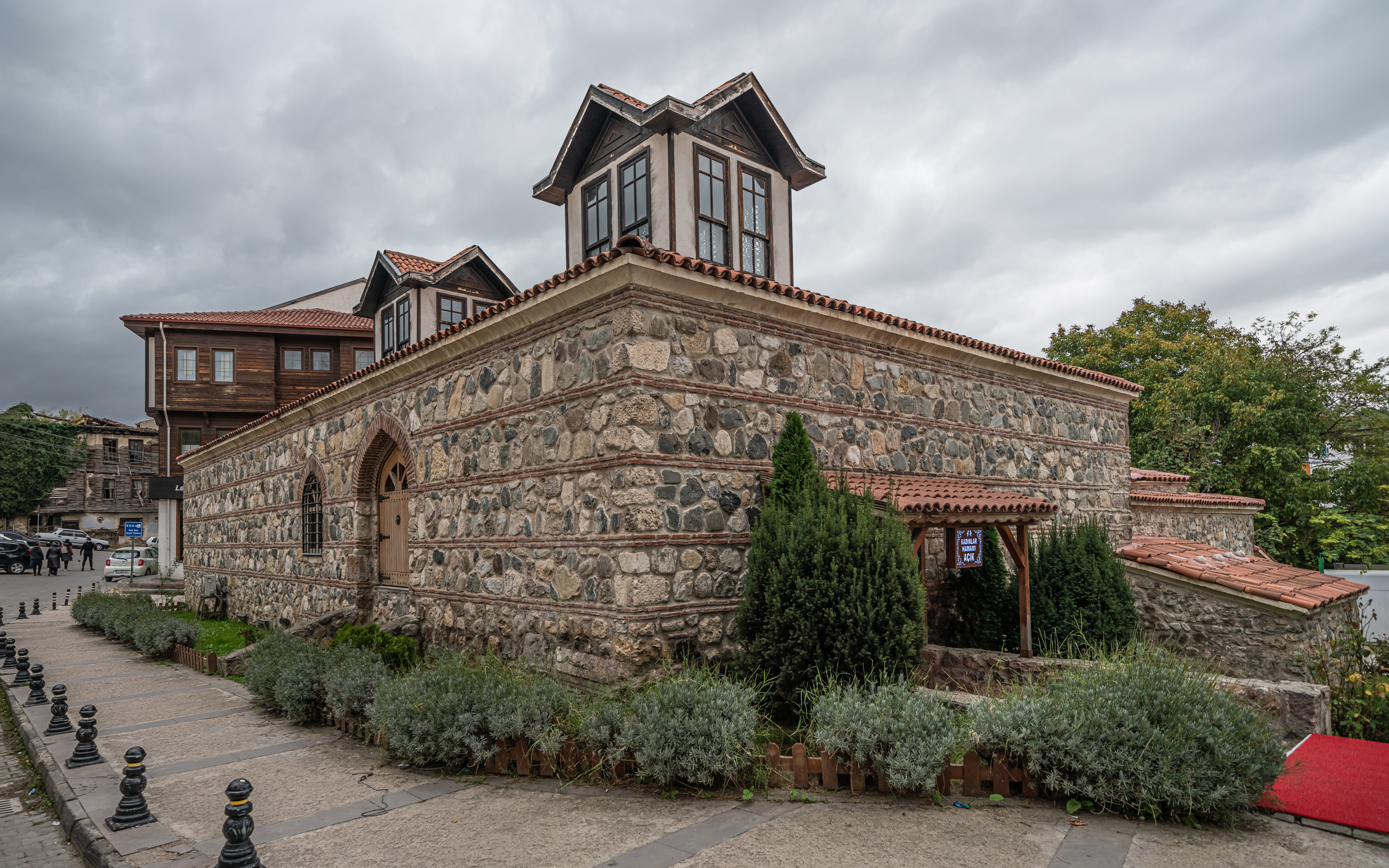
Bolu Aktaş hamam

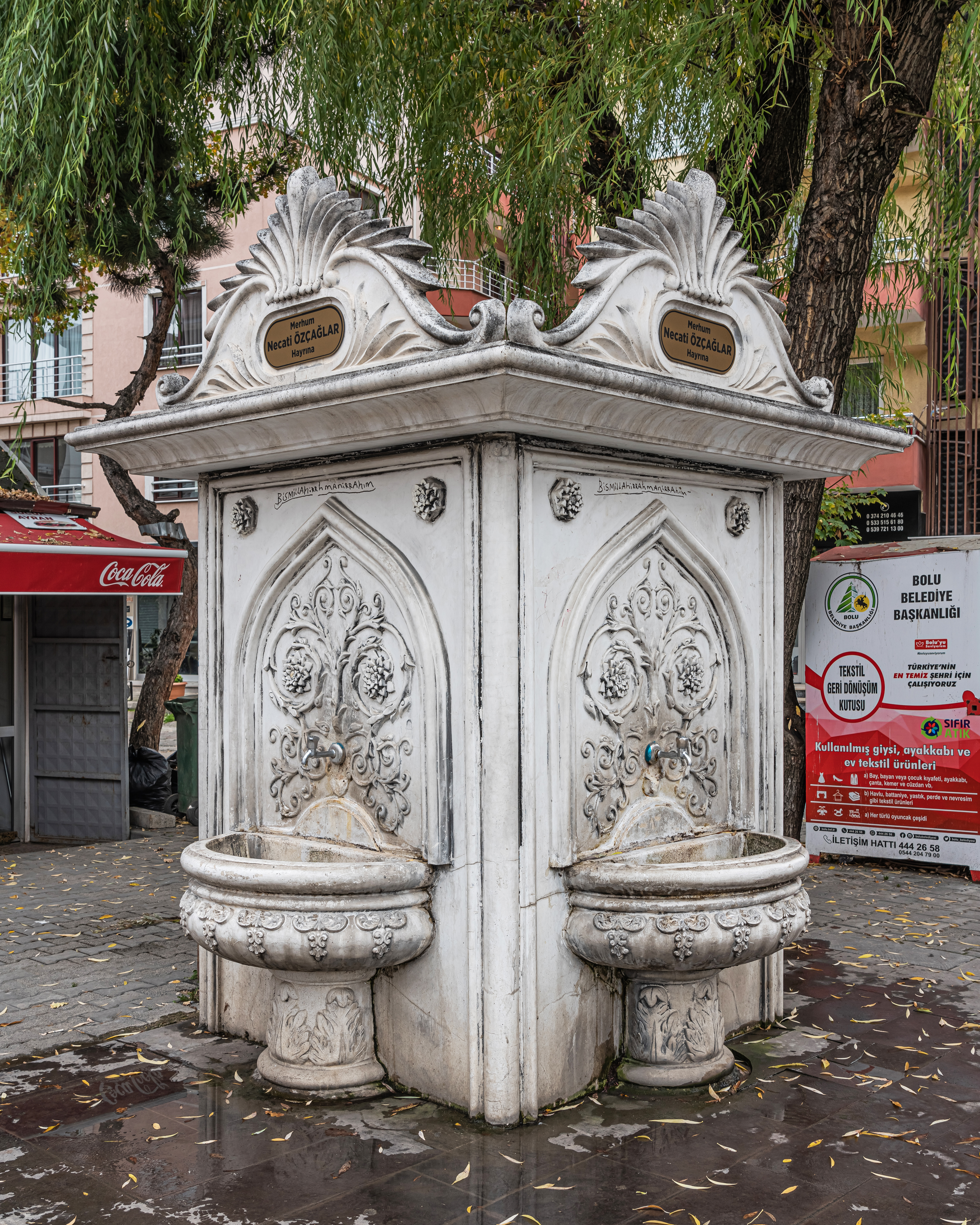
Bolu street fountain

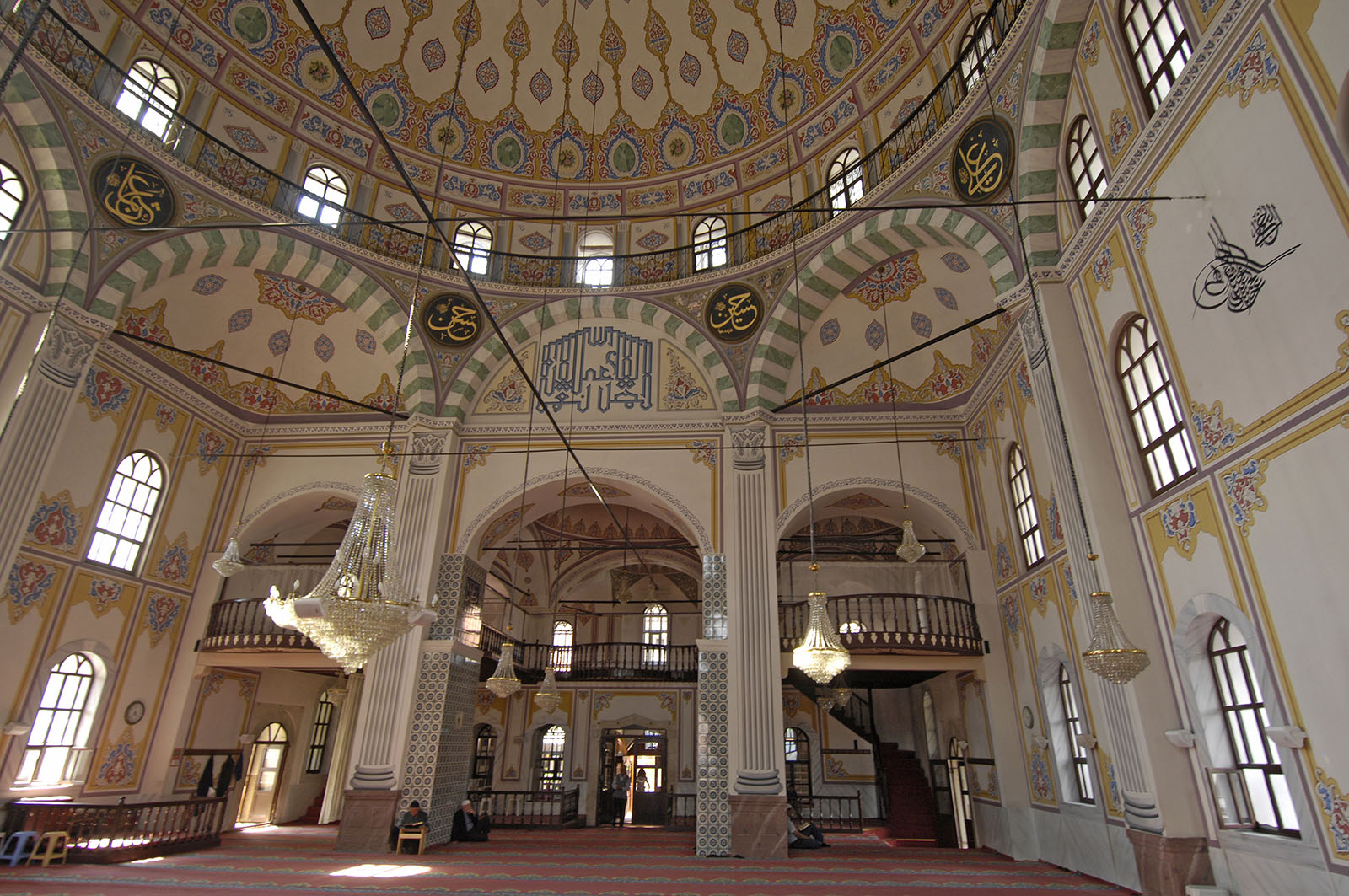
Bolu Ulu Cami or Beyazıt Mosque interior

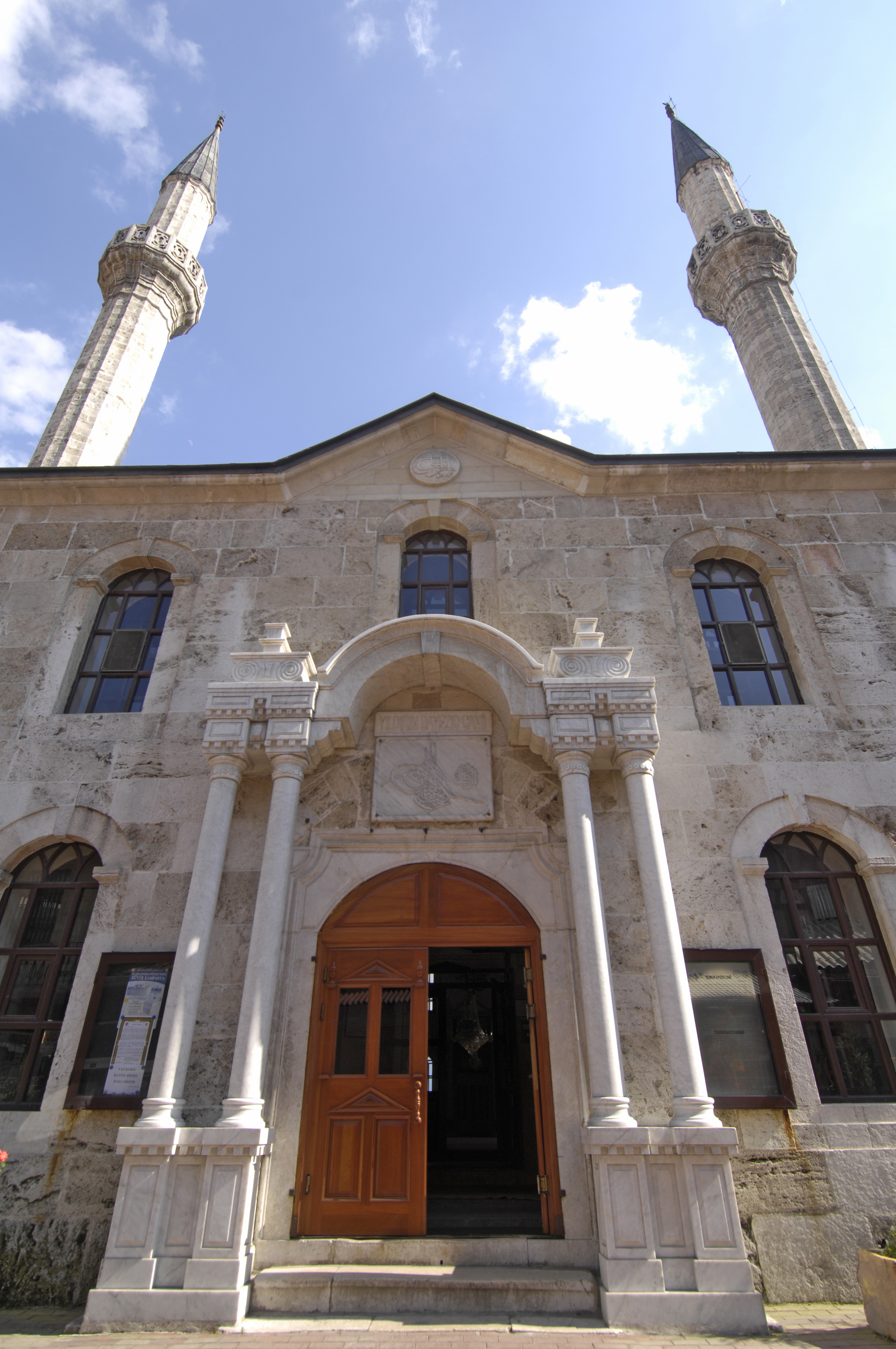
Bolu Ulu Cami or Beyazıt Mosque entrance

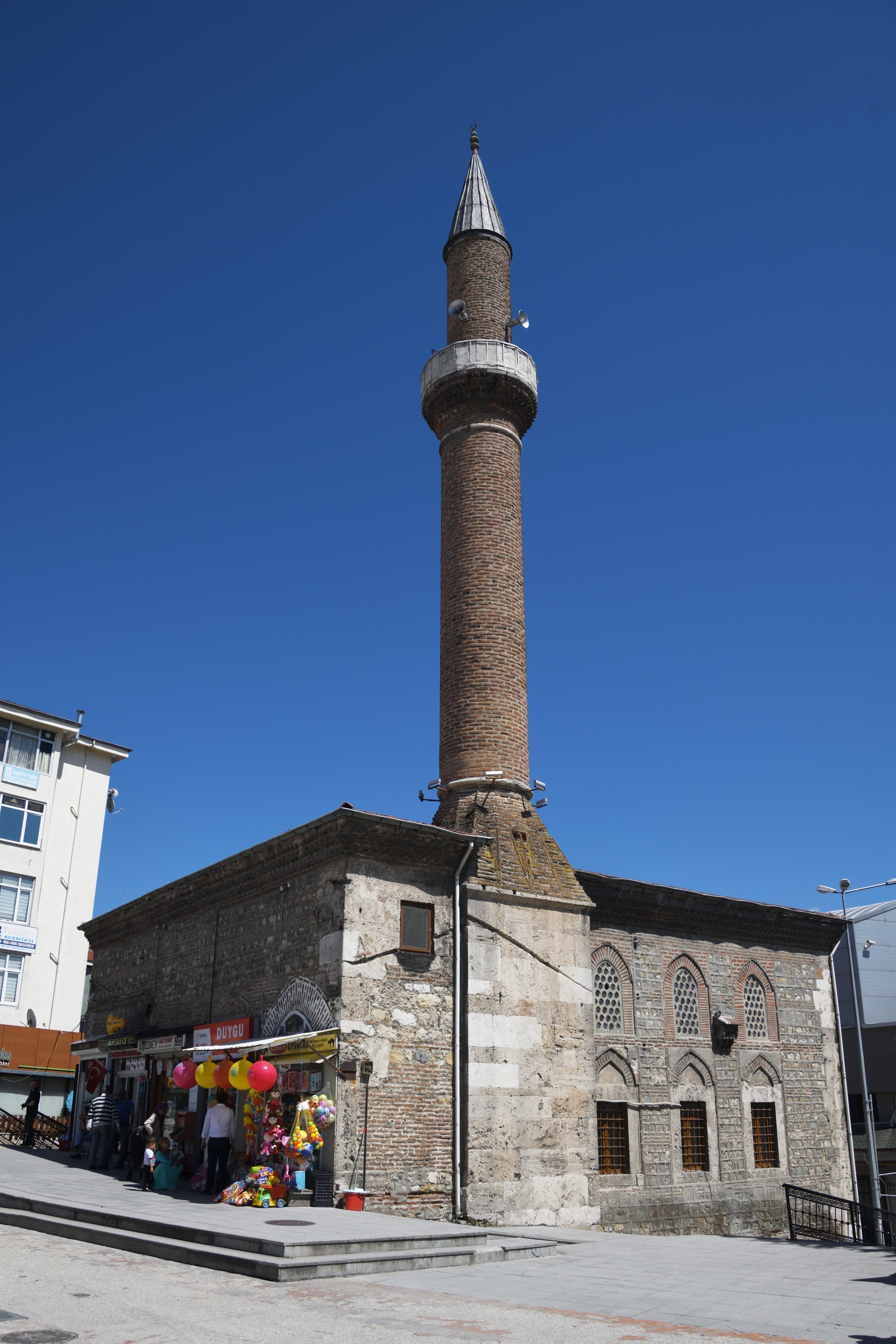
Bolu Saraçhane Mosque

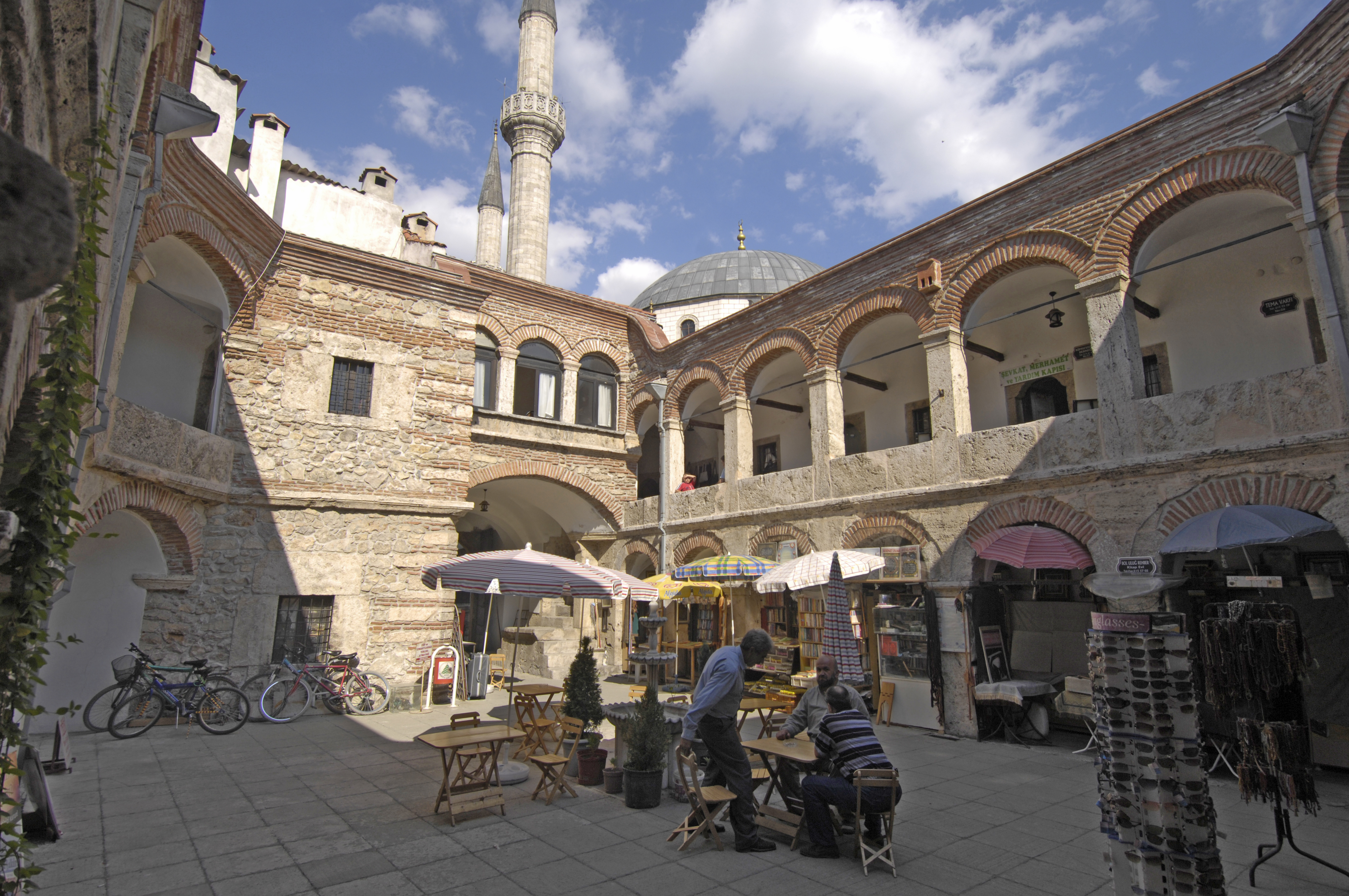
Bolu Yukarı Taş Han

=== Cuisine ===
Local specialities include a sweet made of hazelnuts (which grow in abundance here) and an eau-de-cologne with the scent of grass. One feature of Bolu dear to the local people is the soft spring water (kökez suyu) obtained from fountains in the town.

=== Media ===
Bolu is home to 12 local newspapers published in the city centre, two local TV channels (Köroğlu TV and Abant TV), three local radio stations and six local magazines.

== Economy ==
Bolu is a busy market town rather than a large city. It has one long shopping street and an attractive forested mountain countryside. Students from the university and soldiers based in Bolu make an important contribution to the local economy, which traditionally depended on forestry and handicrafts. Market day is Monday, when people from the surrounding villages come into town for their weekly shop.

The main road from Istanbul to Ankara used to cross Mount Bolu, although more people would stop at the roadside restaurants than actually come into the town, and anyway now the Mount Bolu Tunnel is open most people will rush by on the motorway rather than climb up into Bolu, especially in winter when the road has often been closed due to ice and snow. Some of the service stations on the mountain road have already announced their closure or moved elsewhere.

== Climate ==
Bolu has a borderline oceanic climate and humid continental climate (Köppen climate classification: Cfb, or Trewartha climate classification: Dcb), with chilly, snowy winters and warm summers with cool nights. Bolu is a fairly cloudy and foggy city and annual sunshine hours are about 1,800. Unlike the low-lying, sheltered city center, many parts of the province, like Gerede, have a colder humid continental climate (Dfb/Dcb), due to cold winters.

Highest recorded temperature:42.8 °C (109.0 °F) on 15 August 2023
Lowest recorded temperature:−31.5 °C (−24.7 °F) on 5 January 1942

Climate data for Bolu (1991–2020, extremes 1929–2023)
Month	Jan	Feb	Mar	Apr	May	Jun	Jul	Aug	Sep	Oct	Nov	Dec	Year
Record high °C (°F)	19.8 (67.6)	24.1 (75.4)	29.3 (84.7)	31.8 (89.2)	34.6 (94.3)	37.0 (98.6)	39.3 (102.7)	42.8 (109.0)	38.5 (101.3)	34.4 (93.9)	27.0 (80.6)	23.5 (74.3)	42.8 (109.0)
Mean daily maximum °C (°F)	5.8 (42.4)	8.1 (46.6)	11.8 (53.2)	17.1 (62.8)	21.9 (71.4)	25.3 (77.5)	28.2 (82.8)	28.7 (83.7)	25.0 (77.0)	19.7 (67.5)	13.5 (56.3)	7.6 (45.7)	17.7 (63.9)
Daily mean °C (°F)	1.1 (34.0)	2.5 (36.5)	5.4 (41.7)	9.9 (49.8)	14.5 (58.1)	17.9 (64.2)	20.5 (68.9)	20.7 (69.3)	16.6 (61.9)	12.2 (54.0)	6.9 (44.4)	2.9 (37.2)	10.9 (51.6)
Mean daily minimum °C (°F)	−2.4 (27.7)	−1.6 (29.1)	0.6 (33.1)	4.2 (39.6)	8.5 (47.3)	11.7 (53.1)	14.0 (57.2)	14.2 (57.6)	10.7 (51.3)	7.3 (45.1)	2.4 (36.3)	−0.6 (30.9)	5.8 (42.4)
Record low °C (°F)	−31.5 (−24.7)	−25.8 (−14.4)	−19.8 (−3.6)	−11.5 (11.3)	−2.3 (27.9)	0.0 (32.0)	2.8 (37.0)	1.4 (34.5)	−2.5 (27.5)	−5.8 (21.6)	−24.8 (−12.6)	−29.1 (−20.4)	−31.5 (−24.7)
Average precipitation mm (inches)	55.6 (2.19)	50.6 (1.99)	56.2 (2.21)	52.8 (2.08)	64.2 (2.53)	68.9 (2.71)	28.4 (1.12)	27.4 (1.08)	26.5 (1.04)	48.5 (1.91)	40.4 (1.59)	54.1 (2.13)	573.6 (22.58)
Average precipitation days	15.53	14.67	15.73	13.2	14.2	12.73	6.17	5.73	7.63	10.7	11.2	15.57	143.1
Average snowy days	11.1	8.0	6.1	1.2	0	0	0	0	0	0.2	2.1	6.3	35
Average relative humidity (%)	81.5	77.6	73.9	71	72.9	73.7	70.5	70.1	72.4	76.9	77.3	81.5	74.9
Mean monthly sunshine hours	54.2	76.9	119.0	156.4	198.4	223.8	261.1	247.6	186.8	126.0	90.2	50.8	1,751.8
Mean daily sunshine hours	1.7	2.7	3.8	5.2	6.4	7.5	8.4	8.1	6.2	4.1	3.0	1.7	4.9
Source 1: Turkish State Meteorological Service
Source 2: NOAA NCEI(humidity, sun 1991-2020), Meteomanz

== Notable people ==
- Alexandru Callimachi (1737–1821), Prince of Moldavia
- Antinous (c. 111 - c. 130), lover of Roman Emperor Hadrian, posthumously worshiped as a god
- Köroğlu

== Sources and external links ==
- Chisholm, Hugh, ed. (1911). "Boli" . Encyclopædia Britannica (11th ed.). Cambridge University Press.
- Izzet Baysal University official website
- Anatolia.com - Bolu
- Pictures of the city
- Information about Bolu city
- Bolu News

Bibliography - ecclesiastical history

- Konrad Eubel, Hierarchia Catholica Medii Aevi, vol. 2, p. 130; vol. 4, p. 153; vol. 5, p. 161; vol. 6, p. 169
- Raymond Janin, lemma '1. Claudiopolis', in Dictionnaire d'Histoire et de Géographie ecclésiastiques, vol. XII, Paris 1953, coll. 1077–1079
- Michel Lequien, Oriens christianus in quatuor Patriarchatus digestus, Paris 1740, Vol. I, coll. 567-572
- Heinrich Gelzer, Ungedruckte und ungenügend veröffentlichte Texte der Notitiae episcopatuum, in: 'Abhandlungen der philosophisch-historische classe der bayerische Akademie der Wissenschaften, 1901, pp. 529–641
- Pius Bonifacius Gams, Series episcoporum Ecclesiae Catholicae, Leipzig 1931, p. 442
