= List of populated places in Bolu Province =

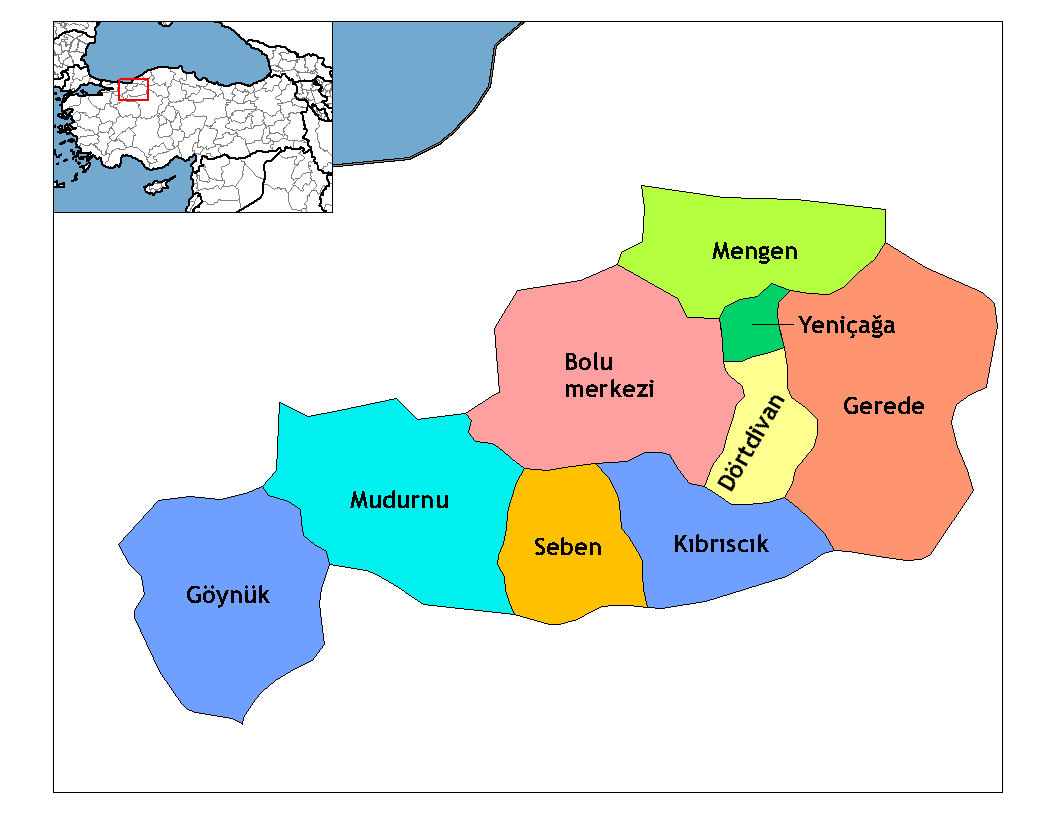
Bolu Province

Below is the list of populated places in Bolu Province, Turkey by the districts. In the following lists first place in each list is the administrative center of the district.

== Bolu ==
- Bolu
- Afşar, Bolu
- Ağaçcılar, Bolu
- Ahmetler, Bolu
- Akçaalan, Bolu
- Alıçören, Bolu
- Aşağıçamlı, Bolu
- Aşağıkuzören, Bolu
- Avdan, Bolu
- Aydıncık, Bolu
- Bağışlar, Bolu
- Bahçeköy, Bolu
- Bakırlı, Bolu
- Baltalı, Bolu
- Banaz, Bolu
- Belkaraağaç, Bolu
- Berk, Bolu
- Bozarmut, Bolu
- Bünüş, Bolu
- Bürnük, Bolu
- Çampınar, Bolu
- Çamyayla, Bolu
- Çanakçılar, Bolu
- Çatakören, Bolu
- Çaygökpınar, Bolu
- Çayırköy, Bolu
- Çepni, Bolu
- Çobankaya, Bolu
- Çömlekçiler, Bolu
- Çukurören, Bolu
- Değirmenbeli, Bolu
- Değirmenderesi, Bolu
- Demirciler, Bolu
- Dereceören, Bolu
- Doğancı, Bolu
- Elmalık, Bolu
- Ericek, Bolu
- Fasıl, Bolu
- Gökpınar, Bolu
- Gölcük, Bolu
- Gölköy, Bolu
- Gövem, Bolu
- Güneyfelekettin, Bolu
- Hamzabey, Bolu
- Hıdırşeyhler, Bolu
- Ilıcakınık, Bolu
- Işıklar, Bolu
- Kandamış, Bolu
- Karacasu, Bolu
- Karaköy, Bolu
- Karamanlar, Bolu
- Karca, Bolu
- Ketenler, Bolu
- Kındıra, Bolu
- Kırha, Bolu
- Kızılağıl, Bolu
- Kolköy, Bolu
- Kozlu, Bolu
- Köprücüler, Bolu
- Kuzfındık, Bolu
- Kuzörendağlı, Bolu
- Kuzörenemirler, Bolu
- Küplüce, Bolu
- Kürkçüler, Bolu
- Merkeşler, Bolu
- Mesciçele, Bolu
- Mesciler, Bolu
- Muratlar, Bolu
- Musluklar, Bolu
- Müstakimler, Bolu
- Nuhlar, Bolu
- Oğulduruk, Bolu
- Okçular, Bolu
- Ömerler, Bolu
- Örencik, Bolu
- Pelitcik, Bolu
- Pirahmetler, Bolu
- Piroğlu, Bolu
- Rüzgarlar, Bolu
- Saççılar, Bolu
- Saraycık, Bolu
- Sazakkınık, Bolu
- Sazakşeyhler, Bolu
- Sebenardı, Bolu
- Semerciler, Bolu
- Sultan, Bolu
- Sultanbey, Bolu
- Susuzkınık, Bolu
- Tarakçı, Bolu
- Taşçılar, Bolu
- Taşoluk, Bolu
- Tatlar, Bolu
- Tekkedere, Bolu
- Tetemeçele, Bolu
- Tokmaklar, Bolu
- Topardıç, Bolu
- Ulumescit, Bolu
- Vakıfgeçitveren, Bolu
- Yakabayat, Bolu
- Yakuplar, Bolu
- Yayladınlar, Bolu
- Yazıören, Bolu
- Yeniakçakavak, Bolu
- Yenicepınar, Bolu
- Yeniçaydurt, Bolu
- Yenigeçitveren, Bolu
- Yenigüney, Bolu
- Yeniköy, Bolu
- Yenipelitcik, Bolu
- Yenisefa, Bolu
- Yeşilçele, Bolu
- Yeşilköy, Bolu
- Yolçatı, Bolu
- Yukarıçamlı, Bolu
- Yumrukaya, Bolu
- Yuva, Bolu

== Dörtdivan ==
- Dörtdivan
- Adaköy, Dörtdivan
- Aşağıdüğer, Dörtdivan
- Aşağısayık, Dörtdivan
- Bünüş, Dörtdivan
- Cemaller, Dörtdivan
- Çalköy, Dörtdivan
- Çardak, Dörtdivan
- Çetikören, Dörtdivan
- Doğancılar, Dörtdivan
- Dülger, Dörtdivan
- Göbüler, Dörtdivan
- Gücükler, Dörtdivan
- Kılıçlar, Dörtdivan
- Kuruca, Dörtdivan
- Ortaköy, Dörtdivan
- Ömerpaşalar, Dörtdivan
- Seyitaliler, Dörtdivan
- Sorkun, Dörtdivan
- Süleler, Dörtdivan
- Yağbaşlar, Dörtdivan
- Yalacık, Dörtdivan
- Yayalar, Dörtdivan
- Yukarıdüğer, Dörtdivan
- Yukarısayık, Dörtdivan

== Gerede ==
- Gerede
- Afşartarakçı, Gerede
- Ağızörengüney, Gerede
- Ahmetler, Gerede
- Akbaş, Gerede
- Akçabey, Gerede
- Akçaşehir, Gerede
- Aktaş, Gerede
- Aktaşkurtlar, Gerede
- Asmaca, Gerede
- Aşağıovacık, Gerede
- Aşağıörenbaşı, Gerede
- Aydınlar, Gerede
- Bahçedere, Gerede
- Balcılar, Gerede
- Beşkonak, Gerede
- Birinciafşar, Gerede
- Bünüş, Gerede
- Çağış, Gerede
- Çalaman, Gerede
- Çalışlar, Gerede
- Çayören, Gerede
- Çayörengüney, Gerede
- Çoğullu, Gerede
- Çukurca, Gerede
- Dağkara, Gerede
- Danişmentler, Gerede
- Davutbeyli, Gerede
- Demircisopran, Gerede
- Demirler, Gerede
- Dikmen, Gerede
- Dursunfakı, Gerede
- Elören, Gerede
- Enseliler, Gerede
- Ertuğrulköy, Gerede
- Eymür, Gerede
- Geçitler, Gerede
- Göynükören, Gerede
- Güneydemirciler, Gerede
- Hacılar, Gerede
- Halaçlar, Gerede
- Hasanlar, Gerede
- Havullu, Gerede
- Ibrıcak, Gerede
- İkinciafşar, Gerede
- İmamlar, Gerede
- İnköy, Gerede
- Kalaç, Gerede
- Kapaklı, Gerede
- Karacadağ, Gerede
- Karacadağdemirciler, Gerede
- Karapazar, Gerede
- Kavacık, Gerede
- Kayıkiraz, Gerede
- Kayısopran, Gerede
- Kazanlar, Gerede
- Koçumlar, Gerede
- Kösreli, Gerede
- Külef, Gerede
- Kürkçüler, Gerede
- Macarlar, Gerede
- Mangallar, Gerede
- Mircekiraz, Gerede
- Mukamlar, Gerede
- Muratfakılar, Gerede
- Mürdükler, Gerede
- Nuhören, Gerede
- Ortaca, Gerede
- Örencik, Gerede
- Salur, Gerede
- Samat, Gerede
- Sapanlıurgancılar, Gerede
- Sarıoğlu, Gerede
- Sipahiler, Gerede
- Sofular, Gerede
- Sungurlar, Gerede
- Süllertoklar, Gerede
- Tatlar, Gerede
- Ulaşlar, Gerede
- Ümitköy, Gerede
- Yağdaş, Gerede
- Yakaboy, Gerede
- Yakakaya, Gerede
- Yazıkara, Gerede
- Yazıköy, Gerede
- Yelkenler, Gerede
- Yenecik, Gerede
- Yeniyapar, Gerede
- Yeşilvadi, Gerede
- Yukarıovacık, Gerede
- Yukarıörenbaşı, Gerede
- Yunuslar, Gerede
- Zeyneller, Gerede

== Göynük ==
- Göynük
- Ahmetbeyler, Göynük
- Akçaalan, Göynük
- Aksaklar, Göynük
- Alanköy, Göynük
- Arıkçayırı, Göynük
- Arızlar, Göynük
- Aşağıkınık, Göynük
- Bayındır, Göynük
- Bekirfakılar, Göynük
- Boyacılar, Göynük
- Bozcaarmut, Göynük
- Bölücekova, Göynük
- Bulanık, Göynük
- Ceylanlı, Göynük
- Çamlıca, Göynük
- Çapar, Göynük
- Çatacık, Göynük
- Çayköy, Göynük
- Çaylakköy, Göynük
- Çubukköy, Göynük
- Dağhacılar, Göynük
- Dağşeyhleri, Göynük
- Dedeler, Göynük
- Değirmenözü, Göynük
- Demirhanlar, Göynük
- Ekinciler, Göynük
- Gerişler, Göynük
- Gökçesaray, Göynük
- Güneyçalıca, Göynük
- Gürpınar, Göynük
- Hacımahmut, Göynük
- Hasanlar, Göynük
- Hilaller, Göynük
- Himmetoğlu, Göynük
- Hisarözü, Göynük
- İbrahimözü, Göynük
- Karaaliler, Göynük
- Karaardıç, Göynük
- Karacalar, Göynük
- Kaşıkçışeyhler, Göynük
- Kayabaşı, Göynük
- Kayalıdere, Göynük
- Kılavuzlar, Göynük
- Kızılkuyu, Göynük
- Kilciler, Göynük
- Kozcağız, Göynük
- Köybaşı, Göynük
- Kumcuk, Göynük
- Kuyupınar, Göynük
- Kürnüç, Göynük
- Memeceler, Göynük
- Mustanlar, Göynük
- Narzanlar, Göynük
- Örencik, Göynük
- Pelitcik, Göynük
- Sarıcalar, Göynük
- Sarılar, Göynük
- Soğukçam, Göynük
- Susuz, Göynük
- Sünnet, Göynük
- Tekirler, Göynük
- Tepebaşı, Göynük
- Umurlar, Göynük
- Yeniköy, Göynük
- Yeşilyazı, Göynük
- Yukarıkınık, Göynük

== Kıbrıscık ==
- Kıbrıscık
- Alanhimmetler, Kıbrıscık
- Alemdar, Kıbrıscık
- Balı, Kıbrıscık
- Belen, Kıbrıscık
- Borucak, Kıbrıscık
- Bölücekkaya, Kıbrıscık
- Çökeler, Kıbrıscık
- Deveci, Kıbrıscık
- Deveören, Kıbrıscık
- Dokumacılar, Kıbrıscık
- Geriş, Kıbrıscık
- Karacaören, Kıbrıscık
- Karaköy, Kıbrıscık
- Kılkara, Kıbrıscık
- Kızılcaören, Kıbrıscık
- Kökez, Kıbrıscık
- Köseler, Kıbrıscık
- Kuzca, Kıbrıscık
- Nadas, Kıbrıscık
- Sarıkaya, Kıbrıscık
- Taşlık, Kıbrıscık
- Yazıca, Kıbrıscık

== Mengen ==
- Mengen
- Afşar, Mengen
- Ağacalar, Mengen
- Ağalar, Mengen
- Akçakoca, Mengen
- Akören, Mengen
- Aktepe, Mengen
- Alibeyler, Mengen
- Arak, Mengen
- Babahızır, Mengen
- Banaz, Mengen
- Başyellice, Mengen
- Bölükören, Mengen
- Bürnük, Mengen
- Çayköy, Mengen
- Çırdak, Mengen
- Çorakkadirler, Mengen
- Çorakmıtırlar, Mengen
- Çubuk, Mengen
- Çukurca, Mengen
- Demirciler, Mengen
- Dereköy, Mengen
- Düzağaç, Mengen
- Düzköy, Mengen
- Elemen, Mengen
- Emirler, Mengen
- Gökçesu, Mengen
- Gözecik, Mengen
- Güneygökçesu, Mengen
- Hacıahmetler, Mengen
- Hayranlar, Mengen
- İlyaslar, Mengen
- Kadılar, Mengen
- Kadısusuz, Mengen
- Karacalar, Mengen
- Karaishak, Mengen
- Karakaya, Mengen
- Karaşeyhler, Mengen
- Kavacık, Mengen
- Kayabaşı, Mengen
- Kayabükü, Mengen
- Kayışlar, Mengen
- Kıyaslar, Mengen
- Konak, Mengen
- Köprübaşı, Mengen
- Kuzgöl, Mengen
- Küçükkuz, Mengen
- Mamatlar, Mengen
- Nazırlar, Mengen
- Pazarköy, Mengen
- Rüknettin, Mengen
- Sarıkadılar, Mengen
- Sazlar, Mengen
- Şahbazlar, Mengen
- Teberikler, Mengen
- Turna, Mengen
- Yellicedemirciler, Mengen
- Yumrutaş, Mengen

== Mudurnu ==
- Mudurnu
- Akyokuş, Mudurnu
- Alpagut, Mudurnu
- Avdullar, Mudurnu
- Bekdemirler, Mudurnu
- Beyderesi, Mudurnu
- Bostancılar, Mudurnu
- Bulanık, Mudurnu
- Cuma, Mudurnu
- Çağşak, Mudurnu
- Çamurluk, Mudurnu
- Çamyurdu, Mudurnu
- Çavuşderesi, Mudurnu
- Çepni, Mudurnu
- Çevreli, Mudurnu
- Dağyolu, Mudurnu
- Dedeler, Mudurnu
- Delice, Mudurnu
- Dereçetinören, Mudurnu
- Dereköy, Mudurnu
- Dodurga, Mudurnu
- Dolayüz, Mudurnu
- Ekinören, Mudurnu
- Elmacıkdere, Mudurnu
- Esenkaya, Mudurnu
- Ferüz, Mudurnu
- Fındıcak, Mudurnu
- Gelinözü, Mudurnu
- Gökören, Mudurnu
- Gölcük, Mudurnu
- Göllüören, Mudurnu
- Göncek, Mudurnu
- Gürçam, Mudurnu
- Güveytepe, Mudurnu
- Hacıhalimler, Mudurnu
- Hacımusalar, Mudurnu
- Hüsamettindere, Mudurnu
- Ilıca, Mudurnu
- İğneciler, Mudurnu
- Kacık, Mudurnu
- Karacasumandıra, Mudurnu
- Karamurat, Mudurnu
- Karapınarkavağı, Mudurnu
- Karataş, Mudurnu
- Karşıköy, Mudurnu
- Kavallar, Mudurnu
- Keçikıran, Mudurnu
- Kilözü, Mudurnu
- Kovucak, Mudurnu
- Kurtlar, Mudurnu
- Mangırlar, Mudurnu
- Munduşlar, Mudurnu
- Ordular, Mudurnu
- Ormanpınar, Mudurnu
- Ortaköy, Mudurnu
- Örencik, Mudurnu
- Pelitözü, Mudurnu
- Samat, Mudurnu
- Samsaçavuş, Mudurnu
- Sarıyar, Mudurnu
- Sarpıncık, Mudurnu
- Sırçalı, Mudurnu
- Sürmeli, Mudurnu
- Taşcılar, Mudurnu
- Taşkesti, Mudurnu
- Tavşansuyu, Mudurnu
- Tımaraktaş, Mudurnu
- Tosunlar, Mudurnu
- Uğurlualan, Mudurnu
- Uzunçam, Mudurnu
- Vakıfaktaş, Mudurnu
- Yaylabeli, Mudurnu
- Yazılar, Mudurnu
- Yeğenderesi, Mudurnu
- Yeniceşeyhler, Mudurnu

== Seben ==
- Seben
- Alpagut, Seben
- Bakırlı, Seben
- Bozyer, Seben
- Çeltikdere, Seben
- Dedeler, Seben
- Değirmenkaya, Seben
- Dereboy, Seben
- Ekiciler, Seben
- Gerenözü, Seben
- Gökhaliller, Seben
- Güneyce, Seben
- Haccağız, Seben
- Hoçaş, Seben
- Kabak, Seben
- Karaağaç, Seben
- Kaşbıyıklar, Seben
- Kesenözü, Seben
- Kızık, Seben
- Korucuk, Seben
- Kozyaka, Seben
- Kuzgölcük, Seben
- Musasofular, Seben
- Nimetli, Seben
- Solaklar, Seben
- Susuz, Seben
- Tazılar, Seben
- Tepe, Seben
- Yağma, Seben
- Yuva, Seben

== Yeniçağa ==
- Yeniçağa
- Adaköy, Yeniçağa
- Aşağıkuldan, Yeniçağa
- Çamlık, Yeniçağa
- Akıncılar, Yeniçağa
- Dereköy, Yeniçağa
- Doğancı, Yeniçağa
- Eskiçağa, Yeniçağa
- Gölbaşı, Yeniçağa
- Hamzabey, Yeniçağa
- Kemaller, Yeniçağa
- Kındıra, Yeniçağa
- Ören, Yeniçağa
- Sarayköy, Yeniçağa
- Şahnalar, Yeniçağa
- Yamanlar, Yeniçağa
- Yukarıkuldan, Yeniçağa
