= Karaköy (disambiguation) =

Karaköy (lit. black village) is a neighborhood of Istanbul, Turkey.

Karaköy may also refer to:

- Galata, historic name of the Karaköy neighborhood
- Karaköy (Tünel), a station on the Tünel funicular railway in Beyoğlu, Istanbul

== Villages in Turkey ==
=== Marmara Region ===
- Balıkesir Province
  - Karaköy, Susurluk
- Bilecik Province
  - Karaköy, Pazaryeri
- Bolu Province
  - Karaköy, Bolu
  - Karaköy, Kıbrıscık

=== Black Sea Region ===
- Artvin Province
  - Karaköy, Şavşat
- Samsun Province
  - Karaköy, Vezirköprü

=== Aegean Region ===
- Aydın Province
  - Karaköy, Aydın
- Muğla Province
  - Karaköy, Datça

=== Central Anatolia Region ===
- Ankara Province
  - Karaköy, Nallıhan
  - Karaköy, Çubuk

=== Mediterranean Region ===
- Antalya Province
  - Karaköy, Elmalı
  - Karaköy, Gündoğmuş
- Karaköy, Bayramiç
- Karaköy, Buldan
- Karaköy, Çavdır
- Karaköy, Kale
- Karaköy, Osmancık
- Karaköy, Yeşilova
- Karaköy, Yenice

=== Southeastern Anatolia Region ===
- Batman Province
  - Karaköy, Hasankeyf
