= Akçaalan =

Akçaalan (literally "quite white area") is a Turkish place name that may refer to several places in Turkey:

- Akçaalan, Bolu, a village in the district of Bolu, Bolu Province
- Akçaalan, Finike, a village in the district of Finike, Antalya Province
- Akçaalan, Göynük, a village in the district of Göynük, Bolu Province
- Akçaalan, Karaman, a village the district of Karaman, Karaman Province
- Akçaalan, Lapseki
