= Bünüş =

Bünüş may refer to the following places in Turkey:

- Bünüş, Bolu, a village in the district of Bolu, Bolu Province
- Bünüş, Gerede, a village in the district of Gerede, Bolu Province
