= Banaz (disambiguation) =

Banaz is a town and district of Uşak Province, Turkey.

Banaz may also refer to:

- Banaz, Bolu, a village in the district of Bolu, Bolu Province, Turkey
- Banaz, Mengen, a village in the district of Mengen, Bolu Province, Turkey
- Banaz a Love Story, a 2012 documentary film
