= Yuva (disambiguation) =

Yuva is a 2004 Indian political film.

Yuva may also refer to:

== TV series and movies ==
- Yuva (Marathi-language TV series), an Indian Marathi-language television series
- Yuva (Telugu-language TV series), an Indian Telugu-language television series
- Yuva (2024 film), a Kannada-language film

== Places ==
- Shahumyan, Ararat, formerly Yuva, a town in Ararat Province, Armenia
- Yuva, Aksaray, a village in the district of Aksaray, Aksaray Province, Turkey
- Yuva, Bolu, a village in the district of Bolu, Bolu Province, Turkey
- Yuva, Kemaliye, a village in the district of Kemaliye, Erzincan Province, Turkey
- Yuva, Orta, a village in the district of Orta, Çankırı Province, Turkey
- Yuva, Pursaklar, a neighbourhood in Pursaklar, Ankara Province, Turkey
- Yuva, Seben, a village in the district of Seben, Bolu Province, Turkey
- Yuva, Silvan, a village in the district of Silvan, Diyarbakır Province, Turkey

== See also ==
- Yuvan (disambiguation)
