= Bürnük =

Bürnük may refer to the following places in Turkey:

- Bürnük, Bolu, a village in the district of Bolu, Bolu Province
- Bürnük, Mengen, a village in the district of Mengen, Bolu Province
- Bürnük, Tosya, a village
