= Mantineion =

Town of ancient Bithynia

Coordinates: 40°48′26″N 32°01′09″E

Mantineion was a town of ancient Bithynia, inhabited in Roman and Byzantine times.

Its site is located near Adaköy, in the Yeniçağa District of Bolu Province of Asiatic Turkey.
