= Kındıra =

Kındıra can refer to:

- Kındıra, Bolu
- Kındıra, Yeniçağa
