= Baltalı =

Baltalı (literally "person with an axe", often a halberdier or woodcutter) is a Turkic name that may refer to:

== Places ==
=== Azerbaijan ===
- Baltalı, Shaki, a village and municipality in the Shaki Rayon

=== Turkey ===
- Baltalı, Bolu, a village in the district of Bolu, Bolu Province
- Baltalı, Çıldır, a village in the district of Çıldır, Ardahan Province
- Baltalı, Gölpazarı, a village in the district of Gölpazarı, Bilecik Province
- Baltalı, Şereflikoçhisar, a village in the district of Şereflikoçhisar, Ankara Province
- Baltalı, Tarsus, a village in Tarsus district of Mersin Province

== See also ==
- Baltacı (disambiguation)
