= Yuvan =

Yuvan may refer to:

- Yuvan, Iran, a village in Miyan Darband Rural District, Kermanshah Province, Iran
- Yuvan (actor), Indian film actor
- Yuvan Shankar Raja, Indian film score and soundtrack composer and singer-songwriter
- Keratam, a 2011 Indian Telugu-language film, simultaneously made in Tamil as Yuvan

== See also ==
- Yuva (disambiguation)
