= Nuhlar =

Nuhlar can refer to:

- Nuhlar, Bolu
- Nuhlar, Düzce
