= Bozarmut (disambiguation) =

Bozarmut is a town in Yatağan district of Muğla Province, Turkey.

Bozarmut (literally "blemished pear" in Turkish) may refer to the following places in Turkey:

- Bozarmut, Bolu, a village in the district of Bolu, Bolu Province
- Bozarmut, Kargı
- Bozarmut, Taşköprü, a village

== See also ==
- Bozcaarmut (disambiguation)
