= Deveören =

Deveören can refer to the following villages in Turkey:

- Deveören, Kıbrıscık
- Deveören, Savaştepe
