= Hoçaş Petrified Forest =

Petrified forest in Turkey

Coordinates: 40.3412°N 31.6599°E

- Hoçaş Fosil Ormanı, Seben Fossil Research Forest
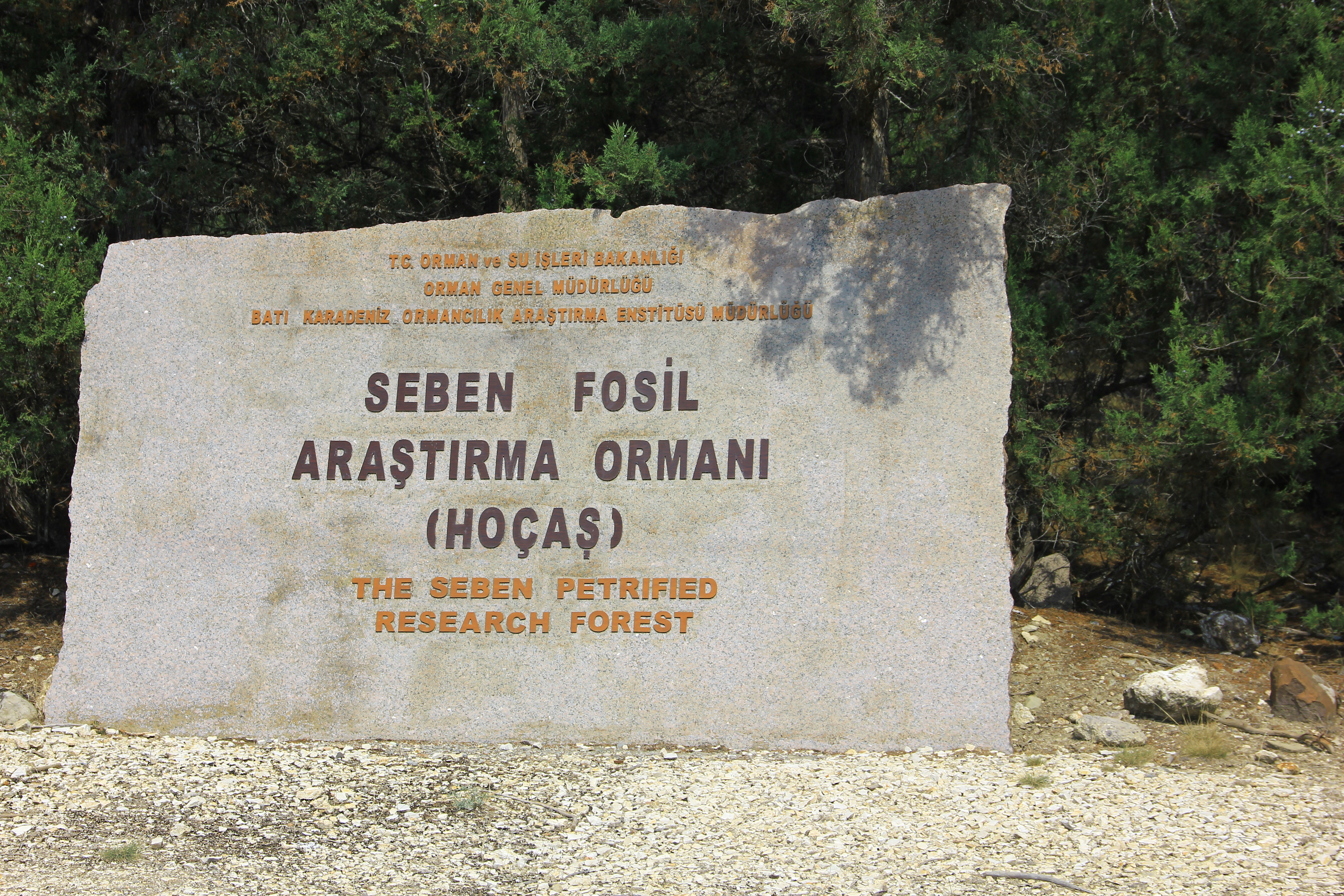
- Signboard at the entrance to the Hoçaş Fossil Forest
- Interactive map of Hoçaş Petrified Forest
- Location: Seben, Bolu Province, Turkey

Hoçaş Petrified Forest (Turkish: Hoçaş Fosil Ormanı), also known as Seben Fossil Research Forest (Turkish: Seben Fosil Araştırma Ormanı), is a petrified forest located in the Seben district of Bolu Province in Turkey. It was registered as a 1st Degree Natural Protected Area in 2005 by the Ankara Cultural and Natural Heritage Preservation Board. A total of 54 fossilized trees were identified in the forest, 51 in planted condition and 13 moved to other places.
