= Cirrha (disambiguation) =

Cirrha was an ancient port of Phocis.

Cirrha, Kirrha, Kirha, or Kirra may also refer to:

== Locations ==
- Kirra, Phocis, the modern site of ancient Cirrha
- Kirra, Queensland, a neighborhood of City of Gold Coast, Queensland
- Kırha, Bolu, a Turkish village of Bolu Province

== Other uses ==
- Cirrha, a disused synonym of Gelechia moths
- Cirrha, a nymph after which Cirrha, Phocis, was said to have been named
- Cirrha Niva, a Dutch progressive metal band
- Kirra Dibb (born 1997), Australian rugby league footballer

== See also ==
- Kira (disambiguation)
