= Yuvraj =

Yuvraj or Yuvaraj or Yuvaraja may refer to:

== People ==
- Yuvraj Singh (born 1981), Indian cricketer
- Yuvraj Singh (cricketer, born 1998), Indian cricketer
- Yuvraj Singh (politician) (2019–2022), Indian politician
- Yuvaraj Adhikari (1920–1983), Nepalese politician
- Yuvaraj Dhayalan (fl. 2011–2015), Indian film director
- V. Yuvaraj (1964–2022), Indian politician

== Other ==
- Yuvraj (title), an Indian title for the crown prince of a kingdom or princely state
- Yuvvraaj, a 2008 Bollywood movie
- Yuvaraja (film), a 2001 Kannada movie

== See also ==
- Yuvaraju (disambiguation)
- Yuva (disambiguation)
- Raja (disambiguation)
