= Mount Bolu Tunnel =

Road tunnel in Turkey

- Interactive map of Mount Bolu Tunnel

Overview
- Location: Mount Bolu
- Coordinates: 40.74596°N 31.45523°E Mt. Bolu Tunnel (Turkey)

- Route: O-4 / E80
- Start: Kaynaşlı, Düzce
- End: Yumrukaya, Bolu

Operation
- Work began: 1993
- Opened: 2007; 19 years ago
- Operator: General Directorate of Highways
- Traffic: automotive

Technical
- Length: 3,014 m (9,888 ft) (east bound); 3,125 m (10,253 ft) (west bound)
- No. of lanes: 2 x 3
- Operating speed: 70 km/h (43 mph)
- Max elevation: 860 m (2,820 ft)
- Min elevation: 810 m (2,660 ft)
- Width: 2 x 17 m (56 ft)
- Grade: 1,7%

Mount Bolu Tunnel (Turkish: Bolu Dağı Tüneli) is a 3.1-kilometre-long (1.9 mi) highway tunnel constructed through the Bolu Mountain in Turkey between Kaynaşlı, Düzce and Yumrukaya, Bolu.

== Construction ==
The tunnel is part of the Gümüşova-Gerede Highway O-4 / E80 within the Trans-European Motorway project, which was carried out by the Turkish Bayındır and Italian Astaldi joint venture since April 16, 1993. The total cost of the tunnel is about US$300 million. It has twin 17-metre-wide (56 ft) bores carrying three lanes of traffic in each direction.

The tunnel crosses the North Anatolian Fault. The November 12, 1999 Düzce earthquake (MW=7.2) caused substantial damage to the tunnel and viaducts, which were under construction at the time of the earthquake.

On September 4, 2005 the excavation of the tunnel in the Istanbul-Ankara direction was finished. The excavation for the tunnel in the Ankara-Istanbul direction was completed by the beginning of August 2005.

== Opening to traffic ==
The Istanbul-Ankara direction (3,014 m (9,888 ft)) was opened to traffic on January 23, 2007 by the Turkish Prime Minister Recep Tayyip Erdoğan and Italian Prime Minister Romano Prodi. Four months following the initial opening, on May 7, the Ankara-Istanbul direction (3,125 m (10,253 ft)) became operational.

Speed in the tunnel is limited to 70 km/h (43 mph). Dangerous goods carriers are not permitted to use the tunnel.

== See also ==
- List of motorway tunnels in Turkey
