= Tarakçı =

Tarakçı can refer to the following villages in Turkey:

- Tarakçı, Bolu
- Tarakçı, Cide
