= Abadan, Pursaklar =

Abadan
- Neighbourhood
- Location in Turkey Abadan (Turkey Central Anatolia)
- Coordinates: 40°07′N 32°52′E
- Country: Turkey
- Province: Ankara
- District: Pursaklar
- Population (2022): 123
- Time zone: UTC+3 (TRT)

Abadan is a neighbourhood in the municipality and district of Pursaklar, Ankara Province, Turkey. Its population is 123 (2022). Before 2008, it was part of the district of Çubuk.
