= Belen, Kıbrıscık =

Belen
- Village
- Location within Turkey
- Coordinates: 40.3972°N 31.7523°E
- Country: Turkey
- Province: Bolu
- District: Kıbrıscık
- Population (2021): 126
- Time zone: UTC+3 (TRT)

Belen is a village in the District of Kıbrıscık, Bolu Province, Turkey. Its population is 126 (2021).
