= Seben District =

District of Bolu Province, Turkey

- District
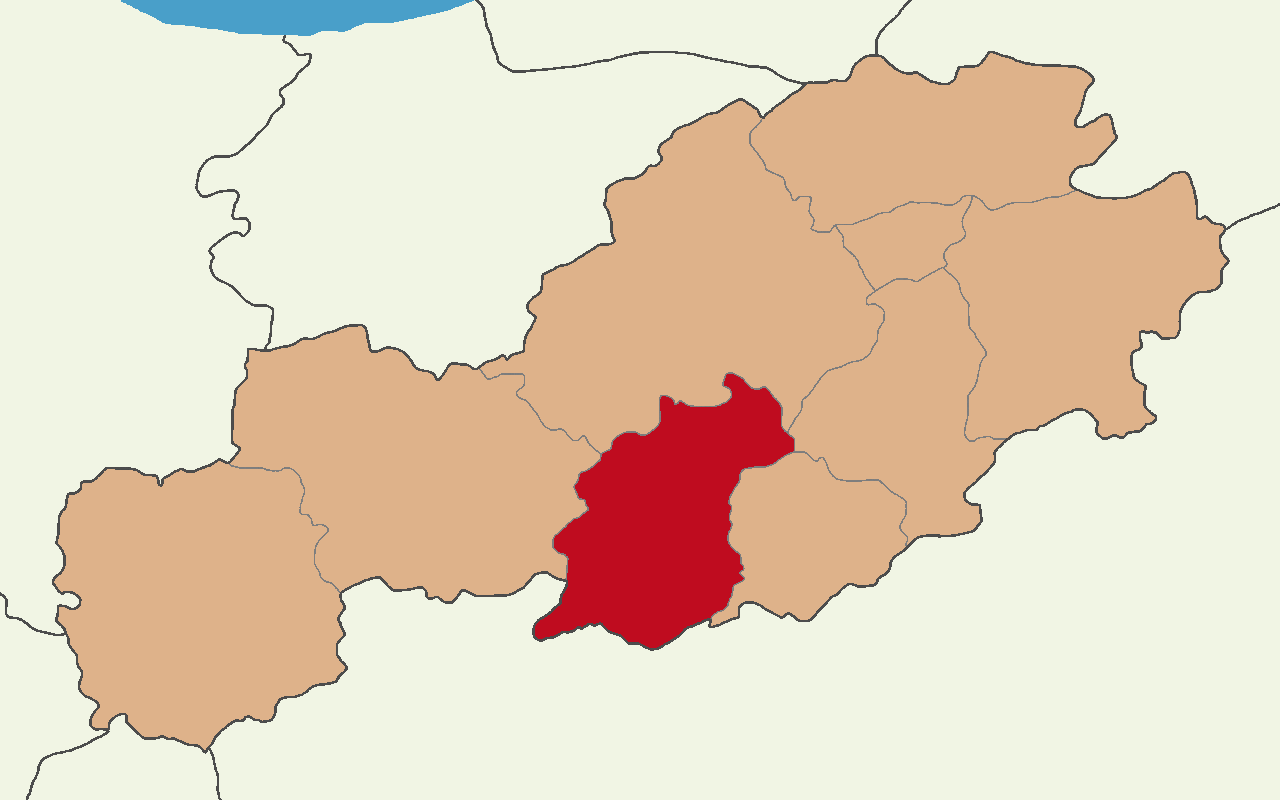
- Map showing Seben District in Bolu Province

- Location in Turkey
- Coordinates: 40°25′N 31°34′E
- Country: Turkey
- Province: Bolu
- Seat: Seben

Government
  - Kaymakam: Tuğçe Orhan
- Area: 683 km^{2} (264 sq mi)
- Population (2021): 4,767
  - Density: 6.98/km^{2} (18.1/sq mi)
- Time zone: UTC+3 (TRT)
- Website: www.seben.gov.tr

Seben District is a district of the Bolu Province of Turkey. Its seat is the town of Seben. Its area is 683 km^{2}, and its population is 4,767 (2021). Seben is known for its apples.

== Composition ==
There is one municipality in Seben District:

- Seben

There are 29 villages in Seben District:

- Alpagut
- Bakırlı
- Bozyer
- Çeltikderesi
- Dedeler
- Değirmenkaya
- Dereboyu
- Ekiciler
- Gerenözü
- Gökhaliller
- Güneyce
- Haccağız
- Hoçaş
- Kabakköy
- Karaağaç
- Kaşbıyıklar
- Kesenözü
- Kızık
- Korucuk
- Kozyaka
- Kuzgölcük
- Musasofular
- Nimetli
- Solaklar
- Susuz
- Tazılar
- Tepeköy
- Yağma
- Yuva
