= Kürkçüler, Bolu =

Kürkçüler
- Neighbourhood
- Country: Turkey
- Province: Bolu
- District: Bolu
- Municipality: Bolu
- Population (2021): 2,470
- Time zone: UTC+3 (TRT)

Kürkçüler is a neighbourhood of the city Bolu, Bolu District, Bolu Province, Turkey. Its population is 2,470 (2021).
