= Yuvaraju =

Yuvaraju may refer to these Indian films:

- Yuvaraju (1982 film), a Telugu-language drama film
- Yuvaraju (2000 film), a Telugu-language romantic drama film

== See also ==
- Yuvaraja (disambiguation)
