= Bozcaarmut =

Bozcaarmut (literally "blemished pear" in Turkish) may refer to the following places in Turkey:

- Bozcaarmut, Göynük, a village in the district of Göynük, Bolu Province
- Bozcaarmut, Pazaryeri, a village in the district of Pazaryeri, Bilecik Province

== See also ==
- Bozarmut (disambiguation)
