= Pursaklar =

Municipality and district in Ankara, Turkey

- District and municipality
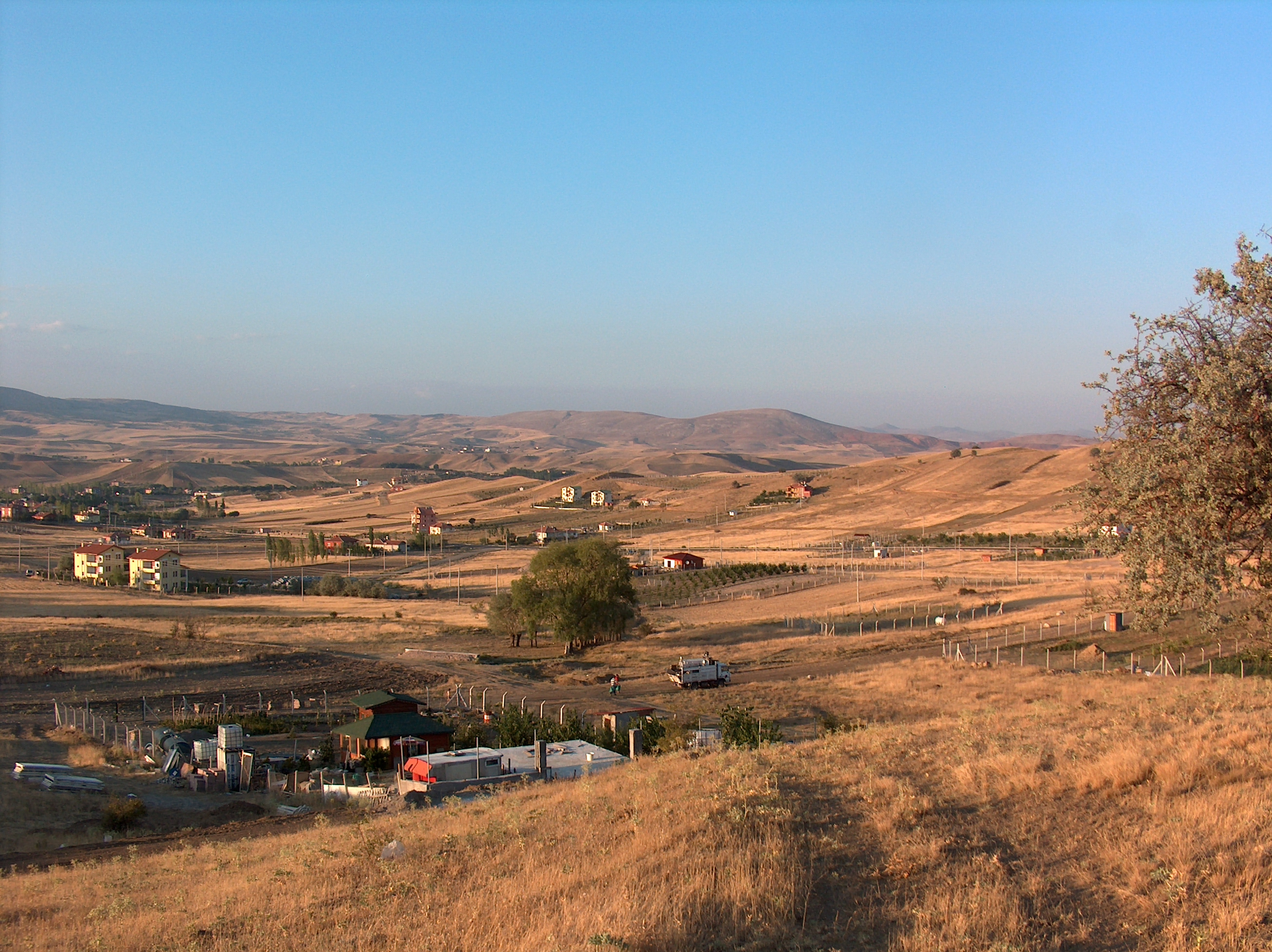

- Logo

- Map showing Pursaklar District in Ankara Province

- Location within Turkey Location within Turkey Central Anatolia
- Coordinates: 40°02′19″N 32°53′49″E
- Country: Turkey
- Province: Ankara

Government
  - Mayor: Ertuğrul Çetin (AKP)
- Area: 169 km^{2} (65 sq mi)
- Elevation: 1,049 m (3,442 ft)
- Population (2022): 162,389
  - Density: 961/km^{2} (2,490/sq mi)
- Time zone: UTC+3 (TRT)
- Area code: 0312
- Website: www.pursaklar.bel.tr

Pursaklar is a municipality and metropolitan district of Ankara Province, Turkey. Its area is 169 km^{2}, and its population is 162,389 (2022). It became a town municipality within the district of Keçiören in 1986. In 2008 it became a district, and the former municipalities of Sarayköy, Sirkeli and Altınova (partly) were added to it.

== Composition ==
There are 21 neighbourhoods in Pursaklar District:

- Abadan
- Altınova
- Ayyıldız
- Fatih
- Karaköy
- Karşıyaka
- Kösrelikkızığı
- Merkez
- Mimar Sinan
- Peçenek
- Saray Cumhuriyet
- Saray Fatih
- Saray Gümüşoluk
- Saray Osmangazi
- Sirkeli Yeşilova
- Sirkeli Yeşilyurt
- Tevfik Ileri
- Yeni Karaköy
- Yıldırımbeyazıt
- Yunus Emre
- Yuva

== Demographics ==
Historical population

| Year | Pop. | ±% p.a. |
|---|---|---|
| 1965 | 559 | — |
| 1970 | 820 | +7.96% |
| 1975 | 1,151 | +7.02% |
| 1980 | 1,558 | +6.24% |
| 1985 | 2,179 | +6.94% |
| 1990 | 3,526 | +10.10% |
| 1997 | 13,190 | +20.74% |

| Year | Pop. | ±% p.a. |
|---|---|---|
| 2000 | 27,974 | +28.48% |
| 2007 | 64,197 | +12.60% |
| 2008 | 91,742 | +42.91% |
| 2012 | 119,593 | +6.85% |
| 2017 | 142,317 | +3.54% |
| 2022 | 162,389 | +2.67% |

Population data before 1986 refer to the village of Pursaklar, data between 1986 and 2007 refer to the town municipality of Pursaklar.
Source: 1997 census, TÜIK (2007) and TÜIK (2008-2022)
