= Sirkeli Yeşilova =

- Neighbourhood
- Location in Turkey Sirkeli Yeşilova (Turkey Central Anatolia)
- Coordinates: 40.1404°N 32.8456°E
- Country: Turkey
- Province: Ankara
- District: Pursaklar
- Population (2022): 778
- Time zone: UTC+3 (TRT)

Sirkeli Yeşilova is a neighbourhood in the municipality and district of Pursaklar, Ankara Province, Turkey. Its population is 778 (2022). Before 2008, it was part of the district of Çubuk.
