= Kıbrıscık District =

District of Bolu Province, Turkey

- District
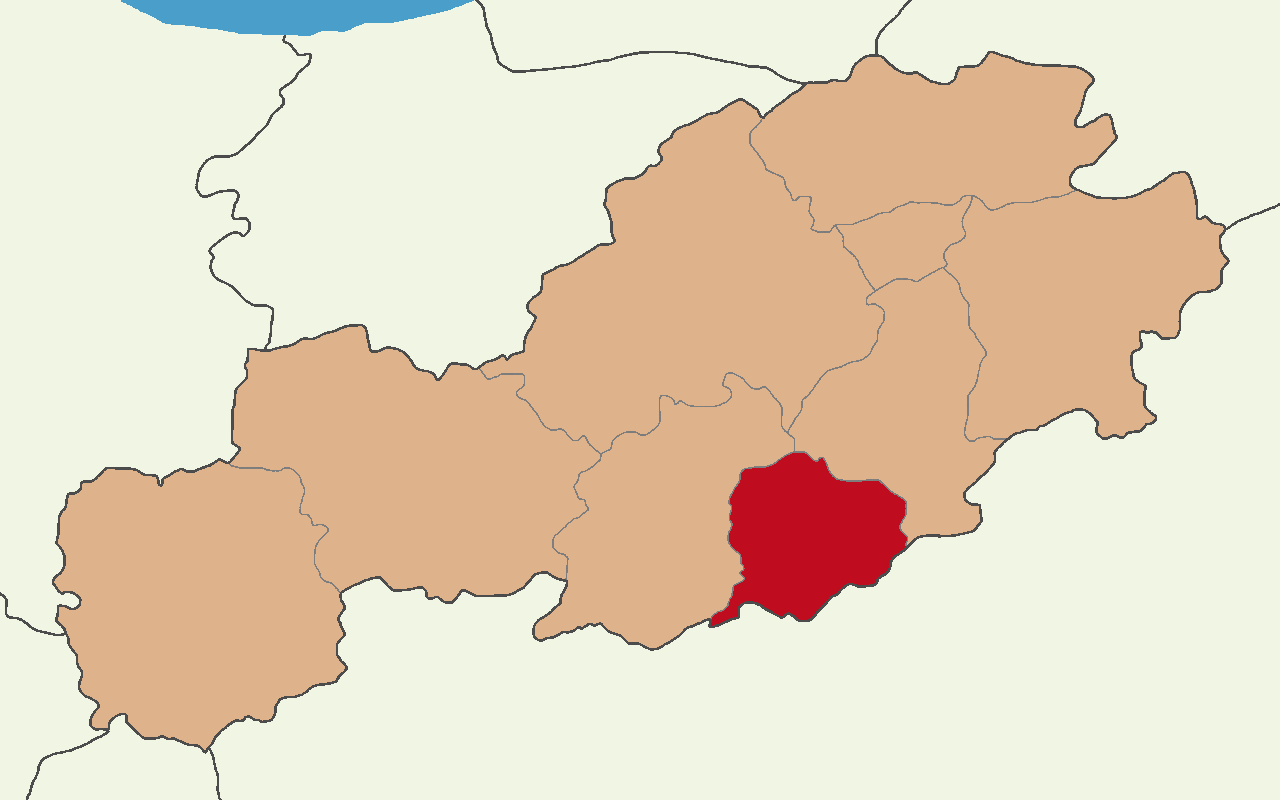
- Map showing Kıbrıscık District in Bolu Province

- Location in Turkey
- Coordinates: 40°24′N 31°51′E
- Country: Turkey
- Province: Bolu
- Seat: Kıbrıscık

Government
  - Kaymakam: Ali Erdoğan
- Area: 562 km^{2} (217 sq mi)
- Population (2021): 3,114
  - Density: 5.54/km^{2} (14.4/sq mi)
- Time zone: UTC+3 (TRT)
- Website: www.kibriscik.gov.tr

Kıbrıscık District is a district of the Bolu Province of Turkey. Its seat is the town of Kıbrıscık. Its area is 562 km^{2}, and its population is 3,114 (2021).

== Composition ==
There is one municipality in Kıbrıscık District:

- Kıbrıscık

There are 22 villages in Kıbrıscık District:

- Alanhimmetler
- Alemdar
- Balı
- Belen
- Bölücekkaya
- Borucak
- Çökeler
- Deveci
- Deveören
- Dokumacılar
- Geriş
- Karacaören
- Karaköy
- Kılkara
- Kızılcaören
- Kökez
- Köseler
- Kuzca
- Nadas
- Sarıkaya
- Taşlık
- Yazıca
