= Rüzgarlar, Bolu =

Rüzgarlar
- Village
- Location within Turkey
- Coordinates: 40°44′N 31°49′E
- Country: Turkey
- Province: Bolu
- District: Bolu
- Population (2021): 161
- Time zone: UTC+3 (TRT)

Rüzgarlar is a village in the Bolu District, Bolu Province, Turkey. As of 2021, it had a population of 161 people.
