= Karaköy, Pursaklar =

Karaköy
- Neighbourhood
- Country: Turkey
- Province: Ankara
- District: Pursaklar
- Population (2022): 61
- Time zone: UTC+3 (TRT)

Karaköy is a neighbourhood in the municipality and district of Pursaklar, Ankara Province, Turkey. Its population is 61 (2022). Before 2008, it was part of the district of Çubuk.
