= Sarayköy, Yeniçağa =

Village in Turkey

Sarayköy
- Village
- Location in Turkey
- Coordinates: 40.8012°N 32.0667°E
- Country: Turkey
- Province: Bolu
- District: Yeniçağa
- Population (2021): 175
- Time zone: UTC+3 (TRT)

Sarayköy is a village in the Yeniçağa District of Bolu Province in Turkey. Its population is 175 (2021).
