= Alanhimmetler, Kıbrıscık =

Alanhimmetler
- Village
- Location within Turkey
- Coordinates: 40°20′45″N 31°46′35″E
- Country: Turkey
- Province: Bolu
- District: Kıbrıscık
- Population (2021): 103
- Time zone: UTC+3 (TRT)

Alanhimmetler is a village in the Kıbrıscık District, Bolu Province, Turkey. Its population is 103 (2021).
