= Bahçeköy, Bolu =

Bahçeköy
- Village
- Location in Turkey
- Coordinates: 40.7681°N 31.7053°E
- Country: Turkey
- Province: Bolu
- District: Bolu
- Population (2021): 431
- Time zone: UTC+3 (TRT)

Bahçeköy is a village in Bolu District, Bolu Province, Turkey. As of 2021, it had a population of 431 people.
