= Ketenler, Bolu =

Ketenler
- Village
- Location within Turkey
- Coordinates: 40°36′N 31°27′E
- Country: Turkey
- Province: Bolu
- District: Bolu
- Population (2021): 40
- Time zone: UTC+3 (TRT)

Ketenler is a village in the Bolu District, Bolu Province, Turkey. As of 2021, it had a population of 40 people.
