= Taşçılar, Bolu =

Taşçılar
- Village
- Location within Turkey
- Coordinates: 40.8215°N 31.7780°E
- Country: Turkey
- Province: Bolu
- District: Bolu
- Population (2021): 78
- Time zone: UTC+3 (TRT)

Taşçılar is a village in Bolu District, Bolu Province, Turkey. As of 2021, it had a population of 78 people.
