= Doğancı, Yeniçağa =

Village in Turkey

Doğancı
- Village
- Country: Turkey
- Province: Bolu
- District: Yeniçağa
- Population (2021): 174
- Time zone: UTC+3 (TRT)

Doğancı is a village in the Yeniçağa District of Bolu Province in Turkey. Its population is 174 (2021).
