= Alıçören, Bolu =

Alıçören
- Village
- Location in Turkey
- Coordinates: 40°46′N 31°46′E
- Country: Turkey
- Province: Bolu
- District: Bolu
- Population (2021): 660
- Time zone: UTC+3 (TRT)

Alıçören is a village in Bolu District, Bolu Province, Turkey. As of 2021, it had a population of 660 people.
