= Kızık, Seben =

Village in Turkey

Kızık
- Village
- Country: Turkey
- Province: Bolu
- District: Seben
- Population (2021): 98
- Time zone: UTC+3 (TRT)

Kızık is a village in the Seben District of Bolu Province in Turkey. Its population is 98 (2021).
