= Yenipelitçik, Bolu =

Yenipelitcik
- Village
- Location within Turkey
- Coordinates: 40°39′N 31°54′E
- Country: Turkey
- Province: Bolu
- District: Bolu
- Population (2021): 137
- Time zone: UTC+3 (TRT)

Yenipelitcik is a village in Bolu District, Bolu Province, Turkey. As of 2021, it had a population of 137 people.
