= Ağaçcılar, Bolu =

Ağaçcılar
- Village
- Location in Turkey
- Coordinates: 40°45′5″N 31°33′28″E
- Country: Turkey
- Province: Bolu
- District: Bolu
- Population (2021): 622
- Time zone: UTC+3 (TRT)

Ağaçcılar is a village in Bolu District, Bolu Province, Turkey. As of 2021, it had a population of 622 people.
