= Ören, Yeniçağa =

Village in Turkey

Ören
- Village
- Country: Turkey
- Province: Bolu
- District: Yeniçağa
- Population (2021): 135
- Time zone: UTC+3 (TRT)

Ören is a village in the Yeniçağa District of Bolu Province in Turkey. Its population is 135 (2021).
