= Çobankaya, Bolu =

Çobankaya
- Village
- Location within Turkey
- Country: Turkey
- Province: Bolu
- District: Bolu
- Population (2021): 296
- Time zone: UTC+3 (TRT)

Çobankaya is a village in the Bolu District, Bolu Province, Turkey. As of 2021, it had a population of 296 people.
