= Karaköy, Bolu =

Karaköy
- Neighbourhood
- Country: Turkey
- Province: Bolu
- District: Bolu
- Municipality: Bolu
- Population (2021): 4,127
- Time zone: UTC+3 (TRT)

Karaköy is a neighbourhood of the city of Bolu, Bolu District, Bolu Province, Turkey. As of 2021, it had a population of 4,127 people.
