= Kökez, Kıbrıscık =

Kökez
- Village
- Location within Turkey
- Coordinates: 40.4319°N 31.8338°E
- Country: Turkey
- Province: Bolu
- District: Kıbrıscık
- Population (2021): 89
- Time zone: UTC+3 (TRT)

Kökez is a village in the Kıbrıscık District, Bolu Province, Turkey. Its population is 89 (2021).
