= Yazıören, Bolu =

Yazıören
- Village
- Location within Turkey
- Coordinates: 40°45′22″N 31°41′36″E
- Country: Turkey
- Province: Bolu
- District: Bolu
- Population (2021): 267
- Time zone: UTC+3 (TRT)

Yazıören is a village in Bolu District, Bolu Province, Turkey. As of 2021, it had a population of 267 people.
