= Köprücüler, Bolu =

Köprücüler
- Village
- Location within Turkey
- Coordinates: 40°42′N 31°35′E
- Country: Turkey
- Province: Bolu
- District: Bolu
- Population (2021): 266
- Time zone: UTC+3 (TRT)

Köprücüler is a village in the Bolu District, Bolu Province, Turkey. As of 2021, it had a population of 266 people.
