= Yolçatı, Bolu =

Yolçatı
- Village
- Location within Turkey
- Coordinates: 40°42′56″N 31°28′31″E
- Country: Turkey
- Province: Bolu
- District: Bolu
- Population (2021): 313
- Time zone: UTC+3 (TRT)

Yolçatı is a village in Bolu District, Bolu Province, Turkey. As of 2021, it had a population of 313 people.
