= Hamzabey, Bolu =

Hamzabey
- Village
- Location within Turkey
- Coordinates: 40.7851°N 31.6565°E
- Country: Turkey
- Province: Bolu
- District: Bolu
- Population (2021): 498
- Time zone: UTC+3 (TRT)

Hamzabey is a village in the Bolu District, Bolu Province, Turkey. As of 2021, it had a population of 498 people.
