= Ömerler, Bolu =

Ömerler
- Village
- Location within Turkey
- Coordinates: 40.6979°N 31.4557°E
- Country: Turkey
- Province: Bolu
- District: Bolu
- Population (2021): 360
- Time zone: UTC+3 (TRT)

Ömerler is a village in the Bolu District, Bolu Province, Turkey. As of 2021, it had a population of 360 people.
