= Kandamış, Bolu =

Kandamış
- Village
- Location within Turkey
- Country: Turkey
- Province: Bolu
- District: Bolu
- Population (2021): 62
- Time zone: UTC+3 (TRT)

Kandamış is a village in the Bolu District, Bolu Province, Turkey. As of 2021, it had a population of 62 people.
