= Yakuplar, Bolu =

Yakuplar
- Village
- Location within Turkey
- Country: Turkey
- Province: Bolu
- District: Bolu
- Population (2021): 264
- Time zone: UTC+3 (TRT)

Yakuplar is a village in Bolu District, Bolu Province, Turkey. As of 2021, it had a population of 264 people.
