= Aydıncık, Bolu =

Aydıncık
- Village
- Location in Turkey
- Coordinates: 40°42′11″N 31°58′41″E
- Country: Turkey
- Province: Bolu
- District: Bolu
- Population (2021): 143
- Time zone: UTC+3 (TRT)

Aydıncık is a village in Bolu District, Bolu Province, Turkey. As of 2021, it had a population of 143 people.
