= Doğancı, Bolu =

Doğancı
- Village
- Location within Turkey
- Coordinates: 40°42′4″N 31°33′58″E
- Country: Turkey
- Province: Bolu
- District: Bolu
- Population (2021): 1,067
- Time zone: UTC+3 (TRT)

Doğancı is a village in the Bolu District, Bolu Province, Turkey. As of 2021, it had a population of 1,067 people.
