= Köseler, Kıbrıscık =

Köseler
- Village
- Location within Turkey
- Coordinates: 40.3882°N 31.9221°E
- Country: Turkey
- Province: Bolu
- District: Kıbrıscık
- Population (2021): 88
- Time zone: UTC+3 (TRT)

Köseler is a village in the Kıbrıscık District, Bolu Province, Turkey. Its population is 88 (2021).
