= Yeniçağa District =

District of Bolu Province, Turkey

- District
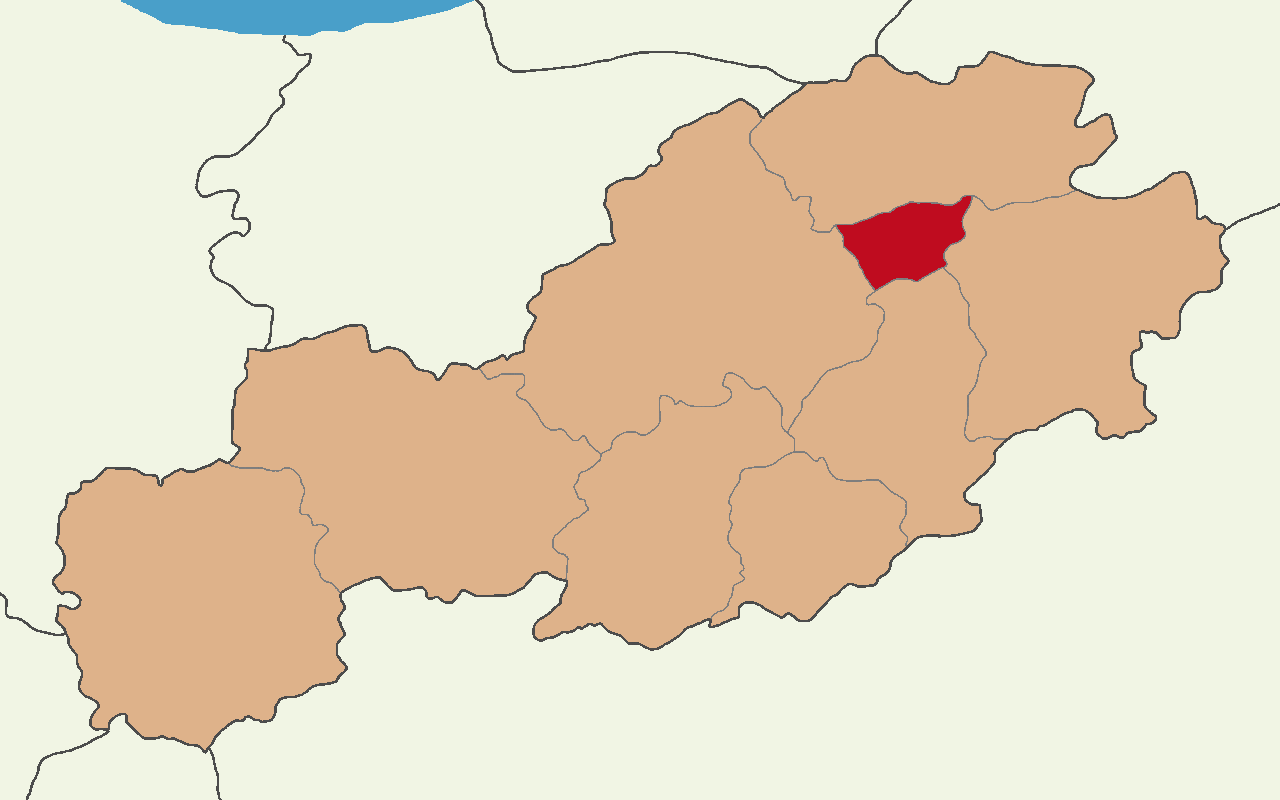
- Map showing Yeniçağa District in Bolu Province

- Location in Turkey
- Coordinates: 40°46′N 32°01′E
- Country: Turkey
- Province: Bolu
- Seat: Yeniçağa

Government
  - Kaymakam: Bilal Çelik
- Area: 163 km^{2} (63 sq mi)
- Population (2021): 6,838
  - Density: 42.0/km^{2} (109/sq mi)
- Time zone: UTC+3 (TRT)
- Website: www.yenicaga.gov.tr

Yeniçağa District is a district of the Bolu Province of Turkey. Its seat is the town of Yeniçağa. Its area is 163 km^{2}, and its population is 6,838 (2021). The district is on the inland side of Bolu Mountain and has a cold, hard, dry inland climate; the countryside is pine-forested on the northern and western parts of the district whereas the south-eastern parts are sparsely wooded hills.

== Composition ==
There is one municipality in Yeniçağa District:

- Yeniçağa

There are 16 villages in Yeniçağa District:

- Adaköy
- Akıncılar
- Aşağıkuldan
- Çamlık
- Dereköy
- Doğancı
- Eskiçağa
- Gölbaşı
- Hamzabey
- Kemaller
- Kındıra
- Ören
- Şahnalar
- Sarayköy
- Yamanlar
- Yukarıkuldan
