= Dedeler, Seben =

Village in Turkey

Dedeler
- Village
- Country: Turkey
- Province: Bolu
- District: Seben
- Population (2021): 63
- Time zone: UTC+3 (TRT)

Dedeler is a village in the Seben District of Bolu Province in Turkey. Its population is 63 (2021).
