= Bakırlı, Seben =

Village in Turkey

Bakırlı
- Village
- Location in Turkey
- Coordinates: 40.3728°N 31.5776°E
- Country: Turkey
- Province: Bolu
- District: Seben
- Population (2021): 51
- Time zone: UTC+3 (TRT)

Bakırlı is a village in the Seben District of Bolu Province in Turkey. Its population is 51 (2021).
