= Mesciler, Bolu =

Mesciler
- Village
- Location within Turkey
- Coordinates: 40°41′N 31°38′E
- Country: Turkey
- Province: Bolu
- District: Bolu
- Population (2021): 717
- Time zone: UTC+3 (TRT)

Mesciler is a village in the Bolu District, Bolu Province, Turkey. As of 2021, it had a population of 717 people.
