= Tazılar, Seben =

Village in Turkey

Tazılar
- Village
- Location in Turkey
- Coordinates: 40°23′41″N 31°42′45″E
- Country: Turkey
- Province: Bolu
- District: Seben
- Population (2021): 49
- Time zone: UTC+3 (TRT)

Tazılar is a village in the Seben District of Bolu Province in Turkey. Its population was 49 in 2021.
