= Yamanlar, Yeniçağa =

Village in Turkey

Yamanlar
- Village
- Country: Turkey
- Province: Bolu
- District: Yeniçağa
- Population (2021): 134
- Time zone: UTC+3 (TRT)

Yamanlar is a village in the Yeniçağa District of Bolu Province in Turkey. Its population is 134 (2021).
