= Baltalı, Shaki =

Baltalı
- Municipality
- Location within Azerbaijan Location within Shaki-Zagatala Economic Region
- Coordinates: 41°10′45″N 47°05′15″E
- Country: Azerbaijan
- Rayon: Shaki

Population
  - Total: 1,900
- Time zone: UTC+4 (AZT)
  - Summer (DST): UTC+5 (AZT)

Baltalı (also, Baltaly) is a village and municipality in the Shaki Rayon of Azerbaijan. It has a population of 1,900.
