= Çömlekçiler, Bolu =

Çömlekçiler
- Village
- Location within Turkey
- Country: Turkey
- Province: Bolu
- District: Bolu
- Population (2021): 148
- Time zone: UTC+3 (TRT)

Çömlekçiler is a village in the Bolu District, Bolu Province, Turkey. As of 2021, it had a population of 148 people.
