= Aşağıkuldan, Yeniçağa =

Village in Turkey

Aşağıkuldan
- Village
- Location within Turkey
- Coordinates: 40°46′N 32°00′E
- Country: Turkey
- Province: Bolu
- District: Yeniçağa
- Population (2021): 107
- Time zone: UTC+3 (TRT)

Aşağıkuldan is a village in the Yeniçağa District of Bolu Province in Turkey. Its population is 107 (2021).
