= Çampınar, Bolu =

Çampınar
- Village
- Location within Turkey
- Coordinates: 40.6804°N 31.5853°E
- Country: Turkey
- Province: Bolu
- District: Bolu
- Population (2021): 184
- Time zone: UTC+3 (TRT)

Çampınar is a village in the Bolu District, Bolu Province, Turkey. As of 2021, it had a population of 184 people.
