= Gerenözü, Seben =

Village in Turkey

Gerenözü
- Village
- Location in Turkey
- Coordinates: 40°23′N 31°33′E
- Country: Turkey
- Province: Bolu
- District: Seben
- Population (2021): 137
- Time zone: UTC+3 (TRT)

Gerenözü is a village in the Seben District of Bolu Province in Turkey. Its population is 137 (2021).
