= Bölücekkaya, Kıbrıscık =

Bölücekkaya
- Village
- Location within Turkey
- Coordinates: 40°25′N 31°50′E
- Country: Turkey
- Province: Bolu
- District: Kıbrıscık
- Population (2021): 67
- Time zone: UTC+3 (TRT)

Bölücekkaya is a village in the Kıbrıscık District, Bolu Province, Turkey. Its population is 67 (2021).
