= Sazakşeyhler, Bolu =

Sazakşeyhler
- Village
- Location within Turkey
- Coordinates: 40°46′N 31°49′E
- Country: Turkey
- Province: Bolu
- District: Bolu
- Population (2021): 105
- Time zone: UTC+3 (TRT)

Sazakşeyhler is a village in Bolu District, Bolu Province, Turkey. As of 2021, it had a population of 105 people.
