= Hıdırşeyhler, Bolu =

Hıdırşeyhler
- Village
- Location within Turkey
- Coordinates: 40°40′N 31°36′E
- Country: Turkey
- Province: Bolu
- District: Bolu
- Population (2021): 219
- Time zone: UTC+3 (TRT)

Hıdırşeyhler is a village in the Bolu District, Bolu Province, Turkey. As of 2021, it had a population of 219 people.
