= Çayırköy, Bolu =

Çayırköy
- Village
- Location within Turkey
- Country: Turkey
- Province: Bolu
- District: Bolu
- Population (2021): 164
- Time zone: UTC+3 (TRT)

Çayırköy is a village in the Bolu District, Bolu Province, Turkey. As of 2021, it had a population of 164 people.
