= Ericek, Bolu =

Ericek
- Village
- Location within Turkey
- Coordinates: 40°46′33″N 31°55′49″E
- Country: Turkey
- Province: Bolu
- District: Bolu
- Population (2021): 145
- Time zone: UTC+3 (TRT)

Ericek is a village in the Bolu District, Bolu Province, Turkey. As of 2021, it had a population of 145 people.
