= Yazıca, Kıbrıscık =

Yazıca
- Village
- Location within Turkey
- Coordinates: 40.3963°N 31.9336°E
- Country: Turkey
- Province: Bolu
- District: Kıbrıscık
- Population (2021): 134
- Time zone: UTC+3 (TRT)

Yazıca is a village in the Kıbrıscık District, Bolu Province, Turkey. Its population is 134 (2021).
