= Karaağaç, Seben =

Village in Turkey

Karaağaç
- Village
- Location in Turkey
- Coordinates: 40°22′38″N 31°27′7″E
- Country: Turkey
- Province: Bolu
- District: Seben
- Population (2021): 41
- Time zone: UTC+3 (TRT)

Karaağaç is a village in the Seben District of Bolu Province in Turkey. Its population is 41 (2021).
