= Yenigeçitveren, Bolu =

Yenigeçitveren
- Village
- Location within Turkey
- Coordinates: 40°43′45″N 31°40′35″E
- Country: Turkey
- Province: Bolu
- District: Bolu
- Population (2021): 202
- Time zone: UTC+3 (TRT)

Yenigeçitveren is a village in Bolu District, Bolu Province, Turkey. As of 2021, it had a population of 202 people. It is 4 miles from Bolu.
