= Oğulduruk, Bolu =

Oğulduruk
- Village
- Location within Turkey
- Coordinates: 40°46′N 31°44′E
- Country: Turkey
- Province: Bolu
- District: Bolu
- Population (2021): 184
- Time zone: UTC+3 (TRT)

Oğulduruk is a village in Bolu District, Bolu Province, Turkey. As of 2021, it had a population of 184 people.
