= Alemdar, Kıbrıscık =

Alemdar
- Village
- Location within Turkey
- Coordinates: 40.4132°N 31.9495°E
- Country: Turkey
- Province: Bolu
- District: Kıbrıscık
- Population (2021): 199
- Time zone: UTC+3 (TRT)

Alemdar is a village in the Kıbrıscık District, Bolu Province, Turkey. Its population is 199 (2021).
