= Tekkedere, Bolu =

Tekkedere
- Village
- Location in Turkey
- Coordinates: 40°39′N 31°57′E
- Country: Turkey
- Province: Bolu
- District: Bolu
- Population (2021): 307
- Time zone: UTC+3 (TRT)

Tekkedere is a village in Bolu District, Bolu Province, Turkey. As of 2021, it had a population of 307 people.
