= Ekiciler, Seben =

Village in Turkey

Ekiciler
- Village
- Location in Turkey
- Coordinates: 40°26′51″N 31°30′46″E
- Country: Turkey
- Province: Bolu
- District: Seben
- Population (2021): 19
- Time zone: UTC+3 (TRT)

Ekiciler is a village in the Seben District of Bolu Province in Turkey. Its population is 19 (2021).
