= Eskiçağa, Yeniçağa =

Village in Turkey

Eskiçağa
- Village
- Location in Turkey
- Coordinates: 40°49′N 32°02′E
- Country: Turkey
- Province: Bolu
- District: Yeniçağa
- Population (2021): 71
- Time zone: UTC+3 (TRT)

Eskiçağa is a village in the Yeniçağa District of Bolu Province in Turkey. Its population is 71 (2021).
