= Afşar, Bolu =

Afşar
- Village
- Location in Turkey
- Coordinates: 40°45′7″N 31°51′47″E
- Country: Turkey
- Province: Bolu
- District: Bolu
- Population (2021): 172
- Time zone: UTC+3 (TRT)

Afşar is a village in Bolu District, Bolu Province, Turkey. As of 2021, it had a population of 172 people.
