= Kızılağıl, Bolu =

Kızılağıl
- Village
- Location within Turkey
- Coordinates: 40°46′55″N 31°31′36″E
- Country: Turkey
- Province: Bolu
- District: Bolu
- Population (2021): 206
- Time zone: UTC+3 (TRT)

Kızılağıl is a village in the Bolu District, Bolu Province, Turkey. As of 2021, it had a population of 206 people.
