= Yeniçağa =

- Municipality
- Location in Turkey
- Coordinates: 40°46′N 32°01′E
- Country: Turkey
- Province: Bolu
- District: Yeniçağa

Government
  - Mayor: Recai Çağlar (AKP)
- Population (2021): 4,625
- Time zone: UTC+3 (TRT)
- Website: www.yenicaga.bel.tr

Yeniçağa is a town in Bolu Province in the Black Sea region of Turkey, 38 km from the town of Bolu, on the Otoyul 4 highway from Istanbul to Ankara. It is the seat of Yeniçağa District. Its population is 4,625 (2021). Its elevation is about 1200 m. The mayor is Recai Çağlar (AKP).

Yeniçağa is a small town providing basic infrastructure to the surrounding countryside, and successive generations have migrated to large cities in Turkey or abroad in search of jobs and careers.
