= Şahnalar, Yeniçağa =

Village in Turkey

Şahnalar
- Village
- Country: Turkey
- Province: Bolu
- District: Yeniçağa
- Population (2021): 133
- Time zone: UTC+3 (TRT)

Şahnalar is a village in the Yeniçağa District of Bolu Province in Turkey. Its population is 133 (2021).
