= Kesenözü, Seben =

Village in Turkey

Kesenözü
- Village
- Location in Turkey
- Coordinates: 40°19′N 31°33′E
- Country: Turkey
- Province: Bolu
- District: Seben
- Population (2021): 74
- Time zone: UTC+3 (TRT)

Kesenözü is a village in the Seben District of Bolu Province in Turkey. Its population was 74 in 2021.
