= Dokumacılar, Kıbrıscık =

Dokumacılar
- Village
- Location within Turkey
- Coordinates: 40.3747°N 31.7801°E
- Country: Turkey
- Province: Bolu
- District: Kıbrıscık
- Population (2021): 32
- Time zone: UTC+3 (TRT)

Dokumacılar is a village in the Kıbrıscık District, Bolu Province, Turkey. Its population is 32 (2021).
