= Balı, Kıbrıscık =

Balı
- Village
- Location within Turkey
- Coordinates: 40.3590°N 31.7715°E
- Country: Turkey
- Province: Bolu
- District: Kıbrıscık
- Population (2021): 24
- Time zone: UTC+3 (TRT)

Balı is a village in the Kıbrıscık District, Bolu Province, Turkey. Its population is 24 (2021).
