= Sebenardı, Bolu =

Sebenardı
- Village
- Location within Turkey
- Coordinates: 40°35′N 31°33′E
- Country: Turkey
- Province: Bolu
- District: Bolu
- Population (2021): 95
- Time zone: UTC+3 (TRT)

Sebenardı is a village in Bolu District, Bolu Province, Turkey. As of 2021, it had a population of 95 people.
