= Yakabayat, Bolu =

Yakabayat
- Village
- Location within Turkey
- Coordinates: 40°47′N 31°42′E
- Country: Turkey
- Province: Bolu
- District: Bolu
- Population (2021): 458
- Time zone: UTC+3 (TRT)

Yakabayat is a village in Bolu District, Bolu Province, Turkey. As of 2021, it had a population of 458 people.
