= Çepni, Bolu =

Çepni
- Village
- Location within Turkey
- Country: Turkey
- Province: Bolu
- District: Bolu
- Population (2021): 202
- Time zone: UTC+3 (TRT)

Çepni is a village in the Bolu District, Bolu Province, Turkey. As of 2021, it had a population of 202 people.
