= Topardıç, Bolu =

Topardıç
- Village
- Location within Turkey
- Country: Turkey
- Province: Bolu
- District: Bolu
- Population (2021): 134
- Time zone: UTC+3 (TRT)

Topardıç is a village in the Bolu District, Bolu Province, Turkey. As of 2021, it had a population of 134 people.
