= Bağışlar, Bolu =

Bağışlar
- Village
- Location in Turkey
- Coordinates: 40.8456°N 31.7517°E
- Country: Turkey
- Province: Bolu
- District: Bolu
- Population (2021): 83
- Time zone: UTC+3 (TRT)

Bağışlar is a village in Bolu District, Bolu Province, Turkey. As of 2021, it had a population of 83 people.
