= Yukarıkuldan, Yeniçağa =

Village in Turkey

Yukarıkuldan
- Village
- Location in Turkey
- Coordinates: 40°45′39″N 32°01′13″E
- Country: Turkey
- Province: Bolu
- District: Yeniçağa
- Population (2021): 124
- Time zone: UTC+3 (TRT)

Yukarıkuldan is a village in the Yeniçağa District of Bolu Province in Turkey. Its population is 124 (2021).
