= Berk, Bolu =

Berk
- Village
- Location within Turkey
- Coordinates: 40°42′N 31°37′E
- Country: Turkey
- Province: Bolu
- District: Bolu
- Elevation: 710 m (2,330 ft)
- Population (2021): 684
- Time zone: UTC+3 (TRT)
- Postal code: 14030
- Area code: 0374

Berk (also: Berkköy) is a village in the Bolu District of Bolu Province, Turkey. As of 2021, its population was 684. It is situated 5 km (3.1 mi) south of Bolu and to the north of Köroğlu Mountains.

According to village website, the village was named after a Turkmen tribe and was mentioned in the Ottoman Empire documents of 1533. The village economy depends on farming. Legumes and other vegetables are the main crops.
