= Gölbaşı, Yeniçağa =

Village in Turkey

Gölbaşı
- Village
- Location in Turkey
- Coordinates: 40.804°N 32.022°E
- Country: Turkey
- Province: Bolu
- District: Yeniçağa
- Population (2021): 90
- Time zone: UTC+3 (TRT)

Gölbaşı is a village in the Yeniçağa District of Bolu Province in Turkey. Its population is 90 (2021).
