= Gölköy, Bolu =

Gölköy
- Village
- Location within Turkey
- Coordinates: 40°42′15″N 31°30′31″E
- Country: Turkey
- Province: Bolu
- District: Bolu
- Population (2021): 3,067
- Time zone: UTC+3 (TRT)

Gölköy is a village in the Bolu District, Bolu Province, Turkey. As of 2021, it had a population of 3,067 people.
