= Taşlık, Kıbrıscık =

Taşlık
- Village
- Location within Turkey
- Coordinates: 40.3692°N 31.8370°E
- Country: Turkey
- Province: Bolu
- District: Kıbrıscık
- Population (2021): 44
- Time zone: UTC+3 (TRT)

Taşlık is a village in the Kıbrıscık District, Bolu Province, Turkey. Its population is 44 (2021).
