= Gökhaliller, Seben =

Village in Turkey

Gökhaliller
- Village
- Location in Turkey
- Coordinates: 40.3991°N 31.5914°E
- Country: Turkey
- Province: Bolu
- District: Seben
- Population (2021): 44
- Time zone: UTC+3 (TRT)

Gökhaliller is a village in the Seben District of Bolu Province in Turkey. Its population is 44 (2021).
