= Yukarıçamlı, Bolu =

Yukarıçamlı
- Village
- Location within Turkey
- Coordinates: 40.8036°N 31.8022°E
- Country: Turkey
- Province: Bolu
- District: Bolu
- Population (2021): 173
- Time zone: UTC+3 (TRT)

Yukarıçamlı is a village in Bolu District, Bolu Province, Turkey. As of 2021, it had a population of 173 people. It is 18 km from the centre of Bolu.
