= Mesciçele, Bolu =

Mesciçele
- Village
- Location within Turkey
- Coordinates: 40°50′N 31°43′E
- Country: Turkey
- Province: Bolu
- District: Bolu
- Population (2021): 187
- Time zone: UTC+3 (TRT)

Mesciçele is a village in the Bolu District, Bolu Province, Turkey. As of 2021, it had a population of 187 people.
