= Elmalık, Bolu =

Elmalık
- Village
- Location within Turkey
- Coordinates: 40°43′47″N 31°27′10″E
- Country: Turkey
- Province: Bolu
- District: Bolu
- Population (2021): 422
- Time zone: UTC+3 (TRT)

Elmalık (Adyghe: Пэциехьэблэ, romanized: Pətsiyehəblə) is a Hatuqay Circassian village located in the Bolu District of Bolu Province, Turkey. As of 2021, it had a population of 422 people.
