= Geriş, Kıbrıscık =

Geriş
- Village
- Location within Turkey
- Coordinates: 40.3645°N 31.8130°E
- Country: Turkey
- Province: Bolu
- District: Kıbrıscık
- Population (2021): 85
- Time zone: UTC+3 (TRT)

Geriş is a village in the Kıbrıscık District, Bolu Province, Turkey. Its population is 85 (2021).
