= Gölcük, Bolu =

Gölcük
- Village
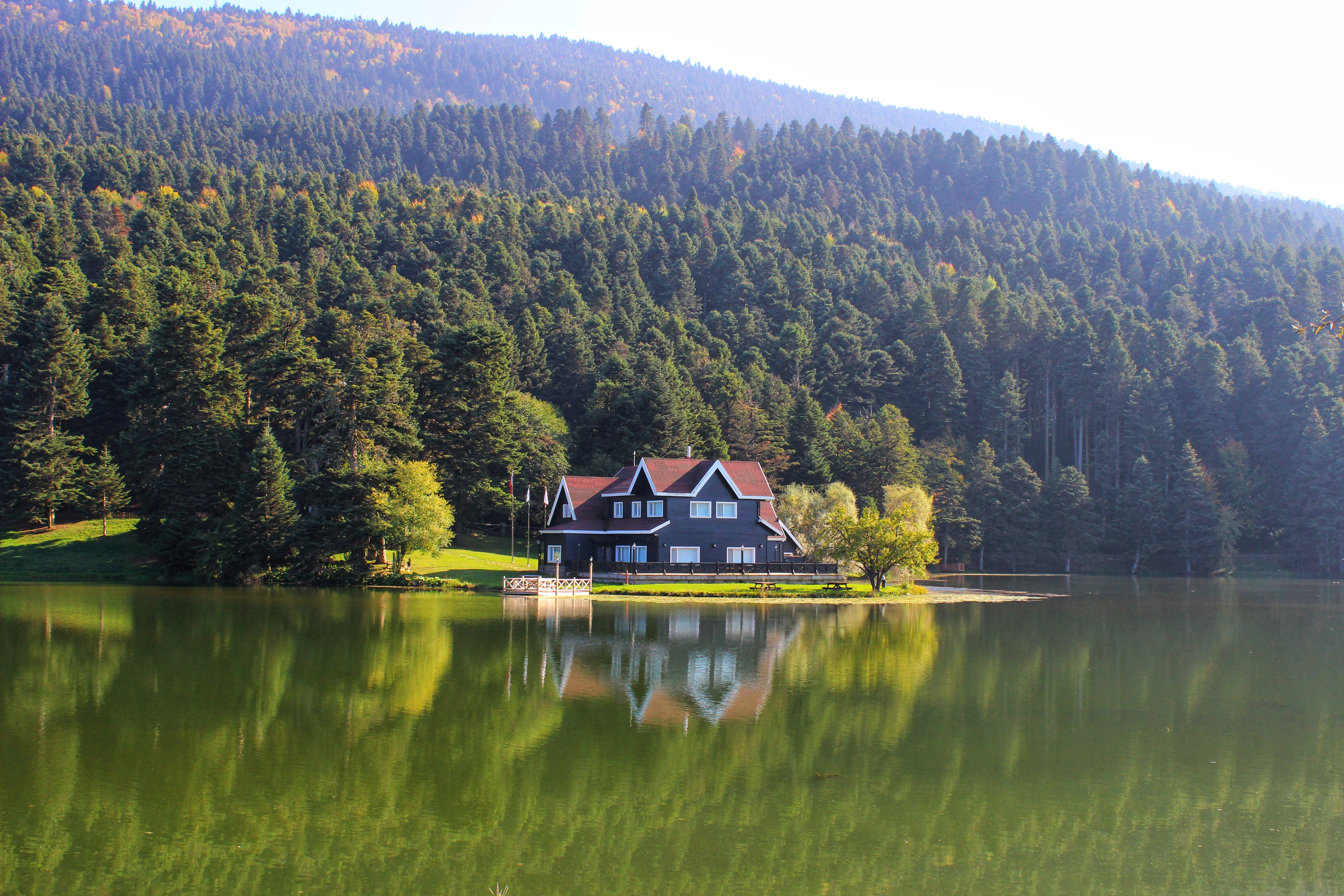
- Lake Gölcük

- Location within Turkey
- Country: Turkey
- Province: Bolu
- District: Bolu
- Population (2021): 154
- Time zone: UTC+3 (TRT)

Gölcük is a village in the Bolu District, Bolu Province, Turkey. The volcanic crater lake is a popular tourist destination. As of 2021, it had a population of 154 people.
