= Vakıfgeçitveren, Bolu =

Vakıfgeçitveren
- Village
- Location in Turkey
- Coordinates: 40°43′40″N 31°41′20″E
- Country: Turkey
- Province: Bolu
- District: Bolu
- Population (2021): 516
- Time zone: UTC+3 (TRT)

Vakıfgeçitveren is a village in Bolu District, Bolu Province, Turkey. As of 2021, it had a population of 516 people.
