= Akıncılar, Bolu Province =

Village in Turkey

Akıncılar
- Village
- Location in Turkey
- Coordinates: 40.7877°N 32.0474°E
- Country: Turkey
- Province: Bolu
- District: Yeniçağa
- Population (2021): 193
- Time zone: UTC+3 (TRT)

Akıncılar is a village in the Yeniçağa District of Bolu Province in Turkey. Its population is 193 (2021).
