= Saççılar, Bolu =

Saççılar
- Village
- Location within Turkey
- Coordinates: 40°38′N 31°31′E
- Country: Turkey
- Province: Bolu
- District: Bolu
- Population (2021): 65
- Time zone: UTC+3 (TRT)

Saççılar is a village in the Bolu District, Bolu Province, Turkey. As of 2021, it had a population of 65 people.
