= Ahmetler, Bolu =

Ahmetler
- Village
- Location in Turkey
- Coordinates: 40.7575°N 31.7064°E
- Country: Turkey
- Province: Bolu
- District: Bolu
- Population (2021): 149
- Time zone: UTC+3 (TRT)

Ahmetler is a village in Bolu District, Bolu Province, Turkey. As of 2021, it had a population of 149 people.
