= Yeniakçakavak, Bolu =

Yeniakçakavak
- Village
- Location within Turkey
- Coordinates: 40°45′N 31°41′E
- Country: Turkey
- Province: Bolu
- District: Bolu
- Population (2021): 460
- Time zone: UTC+3 (TRT)

Yeniakçakavak is a village in Bolu District, Bolu Province, Turkey. As of 2021, it had a population of 460 people.
