= Kuzörenemirler, Bolu =

Kuzörenemirler
- Village
- Location within Turkey
- Coordinates: 40°45′N 31°56′E
- Country: Turkey
- Province: Bolu
- District: Bolu
- Population (2021): 125
- Time zone: UTC+3 (TRT)

Kuzörenemirler is a village in the Bolu District, Bolu Province, Turkey. As of 2021, it had a population of 125 people.
