= Bozyer, Seben =

Village in Turkey

Bozyer
- Village
- Location in Turkey
- Coordinates: 40°26′6″N 31°35′19″E
- Country: Turkey
- Province: Bolu
- District: Seben
- Population (2021): 46
- Time zone: UTC+3 (TRT)

Bozyer is a village in the Seben District of Bolu Province in Turkey. Its population is 46 (2021).
