= Kabakköy, Seben =

Village in Turkey

Kabakköy
- Village
- Location in Turkey
- Coordinates: 40.505531°N 31.494372°E
- Country: Turkey
- Province: Bolu
- District: Seben
- Population (2021): 91
- Time zone: UTC+3 (TRT)

Kabakköy (also: Kabak) is a village in the Seben District of Bolu Province in Turkey. Its population is 91 (2021).
