= Çanakçılar, Bolu =

Çanakçılar
- Village
- Location within Turkey
- Coordinates: 40.7577°N 31.8049°E
- Country: Turkey
- Province: Bolu
- District: Bolu
- Population (2021): 101
- Time zone: UTC+3 (TRT)

Çanakçılar is a village in the Bolu District, Bolu Province, Turkey. As of 2021, it had a population of 101 people.
