= Işıklar, Bolu =

Işıklar
- Village
- Location within Turkey
- Coordinates: 40°40′29″N 31°55′10″E
- Country: Turkey
- Province: Bolu
- District: Bolu
- Population (2021): 233
- Time zone: UTC+3 (TRT)

Işıklar is a village in the Bolu District, Bolu Province, Turkey. As of 2021, it had a population of 233 people.
