= Yuva, Pursaklar =

Yuva
- Neighbourhood
- Location in Turkey Yuva (Turkey Central Anatolia)
- Coordinates: 40.1703°N 32.8614°E
- Country: Turkey
- Province: Ankara
- District: Pursaklar
- Population (2022): 103
- Time zone: UTC+3 (TRT)

Yuva is a neighbourhood in the municipality and district of Pursaklar, Ankara Province, Turkey. Its population is 103 (2022). Before 2008, it was part of the district of Çubuk.
