= Karacasu, Bolu =

Karacasu
- Municipality
- Location in Turkey
- Coordinates: 40°41′20″N 31°37′30″E
- Country: Turkey
- Province: Bolu
- District: Bolu
- Elevation: 730 m (2,400 ft)
- Population (2021): 2,197
- Time zone: UTC+3 (TRT)
- Postal code: 14020
- Area code: 0374
- Website: www.karacasu.bel.tr

Karacasu is a town (belde) in the Bolu District, Bolu Province, Turkey. As of 2021, it had a population of 2,197 people. It is situated 7 km (4.3 mi) far from Bolu to the north of Köroğlu Mountains. The town's economy depends on thermal springs.
