= Yeniköy, Bolu =

Yeniköy
- Village
- Location within Turkey
- Country: Turkey
- Province: Bolu
- District: Bolu
- Population (2021): 338
- Time zone: UTC+3 (TRT)

Yeniköy is a village in Bolu District, Bolu Province, Turkey. As of 2021, it had a population of 338 people.
