= Aşağıçamlı, Bolu =

Aşağıçamlı
- Village
- Location in Turkey
- Coordinates: 40.7908°N 31.7725°E
- Country: Turkey
- Province: Bolu
- District: Bolu
- Population (2021): 64
- Time zone: UTC+3 (TRT)

Aşağıçamlı is a village in Bolu District, Bolu Province, Turkey. As of 2021, it had a population of 64 people.
