= Yuvan, Iran =

Yuvan يوان
- Village
- Location within Iran
- Coordinates: 34°38′14″N 46°55′54″E
- Country: Iran
- Province: Kermanshah
- County: Kermanshah
- Bakhsh: Central
- Rural District: Miyan Darband

Population (2006)
  - Total: 172
- Time zone: UTC+3:30 (IRST)
  - Summer (DST): UTC+4:30 (IRDT)

Yuvan (Persian: يوان, also Romanized as Yūvān and Yavān) is a village in Miyan Darband Rural District, in the Central District of Kermanshah County, Kermanshah Province, Iran. At the 2006 census, its population was 172, in 40 families.
