= Pirahmetler, Bolu =

Pirahmetler
- Village
- Location within Turkey
- Coordinates: 40°46′N 31°34′E
- Country: Turkey
- Province: Bolu
- District: Bolu
- Population (2021): 271
- Time zone: UTC+3 (TRT)

Pirahmetler is a village in the Bolu District, Bolu Province, Turkey. As of 2021, it had a population of 271 people.
