= Yeşilçele, Bolu =

Yeşilçele
- Village
- Location within Turkey
- Coordinates: 40°50′N 31°42′E
- Country: Turkey
- Province: Bolu
- District: Bolu
- Population (2021): 145
- Time zone: UTC+3 (TRT)

Yeşilçele is a village in Bolu District, Bolu Province, Turkey. As of 2021, it had a population of 145 people.
