= Susuzkınık, Bolu =

Susuzkınık
- Village
- Location within Turkey
- Coordinates: 40°44′N 31°43′E
- Country: Turkey
- Province: Bolu
- District: Bolu
- Population (2021): 249
- Time zone: UTC+3 (TRT)

Susuzkınık is a village in Bolu District, Bolu Province, Turkey. As of 2021, it had a population of 249 people.
