= Musluklar, Bolu =

Musluklar
- Village
- Location within Turkey
- Coordinates: 40°47′N 31°41′E
- Country: Turkey
- Province: Bolu
- District: Bolu
- Population (2021): 332
- Time zone: UTC+3 (TRT)

Musluklar is a village in the Bolu District, Bolu Province, Turkey. As of 2021, it had a population of 332 people.
