= Merkeşler, Bolu =

Merkeşler
- Village
- Location within Turkey
- Coordinates: 40°52′N 31°49′E
- Country: Turkey
- Province: Bolu
- District: Bolu
- Population (2021): 269
- Time zone: UTC+3 (TRT)

Merkeşler is a village in the Bolu District, Bolu Province, Turkey. As of 2021, it had a population of 269 people.
