= Dereceören, Bolu =

Dereceören
- Village
- Location within Turkey
- Coordinates: 40°38′17″N 31°22′22″E
- Country: Turkey
- Province: Bolu
- District: Bolu
- Population (2021): 168
- Time zone: UTC+3 (TRT)

Dereceören is a village in the Bolu District, Bolu Province, Turkey. As of 2021, it had a population of 168 people.
