= Çamlık, Yeniçağa =

Village in Turkey

Çamlık
- Village
- Location in Turkey
- Coordinates: 40.8170°N 32.0683°E
- Country: Turkey
- Province: Bolu
- District: Yeniçağa
- Population (2021): 75
- Time zone: UTC+3 (TRT)

Çamlık is a village in the Yeniçağa District of Bolu Province in Turkey. Its population is 75 (2021).
