= Aşağıkuzören, Bolu =

Aşağıkuzören
- Village
- Location in Turkey
- Coordinates: 40°45′N 31°57′E
- Country: Turkey
- Province: Bolu
- District: Bolu
- Population (2021): 164
- Time zone: UTC+3 (TRT)

Aşağıkuzören is a village in Bolu District, Bolu Province, Turkey. As of 2021, it had a population of 164 people.
