= Kılkara, Kıbrıscık =

Kılkara
- Village
- Location within Turkey
- Coordinates: 40°25′N 31°46′E
- Country: Turkey
- Province: Bolu
- District: Kıbrıscık
- Population (2021): 57
- Time zone: UTC+3 (TRT)

Kılkara is a village in the Kıbrıscık District, Bolu Province, Turkey. Its population is 57 (2021).
