= Bakırlı, Bolu =

Bakırlı
- Village
- Location in Turkey
- Coordinates: 40°46′36″N 31°37′39″E
- Country: Turkey
- Province: Bolu
- District: Bolu
- Population (2021): 171
- Time zone: UTC+3 (TRT)

Bakırlı is a village in Bolu District, Bolu Province, Turkey. As of 2021, it had a population of 171 people.
