= Avdan, Bolu =

Avdan
- Village
- Location in Turkey
- Coordinates: 40.6800°N 31.4947°E
- Country: Turkey
- Province: Bolu
- District: Bolu
- Population (2021): 68
- Time zone: UTC+3 (TRT)

Avdan is a village in Bolu District, Bolu Province, Turkey. As of 2021, it had a population of 68 people.
