= Çaygökpınar, Bolu =

Çaygökpınar
- Village
- Location within Turkey
- Coordinates: 40°42′41″N 31°43′15″E
- Country: Turkey
- Province: Bolu
- District: Bolu
- Population (2021): 781
- Time zone: UTC+3 (TRT)

Çaygökpınar is a village in the Bolu District, Bolu Province, Turkey. As of 2021, it had a population of 781 people.
