= Yenisefa, Bolu =

Yenisefa
- Village
- Location within Turkey
- Coordinates: 40°40′N 31°28′E
- Country: Turkey
- Province: Bolu
- District: Bolu
- Population (2021): 181
- Time zone: UTC+3 (TRT)

Yenisefa is a village in Bolu District, Bolu Province, Turkey. As of 2021, it had a population of 181 people.
