= Belkaraağaç, Bolu =

Belkaraağaç
- Village
- Location within Turkey
- Coordinates: 40.6033°N 31.4403°E
- Country: Turkey
- Province: Bolu
- District: Bolu
- Population (2021): 59
- Time zone: UTC+3 (TRT)

Belkaraağaç is a village in the Bolu District, Bolu Province, Turkey. As of 2021, its population was 59.
