= Değirmenkaya, Seben =

Village in Turkey

Değirmenkaya
- Village
- Location within Turkey
- Country: Turkey
- Province: Bolu
- District: Seben
- Population (2021): 47
- Time zone: UTC+3 (TRT)

Değirmenkaya is a village in the Seben District of Bolu Province in Turkey. Its population is 47 (2021).
