= Örencik, Bolu =

Örencik
- Village
- Location within Turkey
- Coordinates: 40.7139°N 31.6464°E
- Country: Turkey
- Province: Bolu
- District: Bolu
- Population (2021): 474
- Time zone: UTC+3 (TRT)

Örencik is a village in the Bolu District, Bolu Province, Turkey. As of 2021, it had a population of 474 people.
