= Karamanlar, Bolu =

Karamanlar
- Village
- Country: Turkey
- Province: Bolu
- District: Bolu
- Population (2021): 91
- Time zone: UTC+3 (TRT)

Karamanlar is a village in the Bolu District, Bolu Province, Turkey. As of 2021 it had a population of 91 people.
