= Yenicepınar, Bolu =

Yenicepınar
- Village
- Location within Turkey
- Country: Turkey
- Province: Bolu
- District: Bolu
- Population (2021): 433
- Time zone: UTC+3 (TRT)

Yenicepınar is a village in Bolu District, Bolu Province, Turkey. As of 2021, it had a population of 433 people.
