= Yağma, Seben =

Village in Turkey

Yağma
- Village
- Location in Turkey
- Coordinates: 40°22′N 31°30′E
- Country: Turkey
- Province: Bolu
- District: Seben
- Population (2021): 69
- Time zone: UTC+3 (TRT)

Yağma is a village in the Seben District of Bolu Province in Turkey. Its population is 69 (2021).
