= Kızılcaören, Kıbrıscık =

Kızılcaören
- Village
- Location within Turkey
- Coordinates: 40.4245°N 31.8862°E
- Country: Turkey
- Province: Bolu
- District: Kıbrıscık
- Population (2021): 73
- Time zone: UTC+3 (TRT)

Kızılcaören is a village in the Kıbrıscık District, Bolu Province, Turkey. Its population is 73 (2021).
