= Okçular, Bolu =

Okçular
- Village
- Location within Turkey
- Country: Turkey
- Province: Bolu
- District: Bolu
- Population (2021): 445
- Time zone: UTC+3 (TRT)

Okçular is a village in Bolu District, Bolu Province, Turkey. As of 2021, it had a population of 445 people.
