= Güneyce, Seben =

Village in Turkey

Güneyce
- Village
- Country: Turkey
- Province: Bolu
- District: Seben
- Population (2021): 123
- Time zone: UTC+3 (TRT)

Güneyce is a village in the Seben District of Bolu Province in Turkey. Its population is 123 (2021).
