= Sarıkaya, Kıbrıscık =

Sarıkaya
- Village
- Location within Turkey
- Country: Turkey
- Province: Bolu
- District: Kıbrıscık
- Population (2021): 101
- Time zone: UTC+3 (TRT)

Sarıkaya is a village in the Kıbrıscık District, Bolu Province, Turkey. Its population is 101 (2021).
