= Alpagut, Seben =

Village in Turkey

Alpagut
- Village
- Location in Turkey
- Coordinates: 40.4146°N 31.5993°E
- Country: Turkey
- Province: Bolu
- District: Seben
- Population (2021): 86
- Time zone: UTC+3 (TRT)

Alpagut is a village in the Seben District of Bolu Province in Turkey. Its population is 86 (2021).
