= Kuzörendağlı, Bolu =

Kuzörendağlı
- Village
- Location within Turkey
- Coordinates: 40°44′N 31°53′E
- Country: Turkey
- Province: Bolu
- District: Bolu
- Population (2021): 103
- Time zone: UTC+3 (TRT)

Kuzörendağlı is a village in the Bolu District, Bolu Province, Turkey. As of 2021, it had a population of 103 people.
