= Değirmenbeli, Bolu =

Değirmenbeli
- Village
- Location within Turkey
- Coordinates: 40°51′N 31°47′E
- Country: Turkey
- Province: Bolu
- District: Bolu
- Population (2021): 232
- Time zone: UTC+3 (TRT)

Değirmenbeli is a village in the Bolu District, Bolu Province, Turkey. As of 2021, it had a population of 232 people.
