= Hoçaş, Seben =

Village in Turkey

Hoçaş
- Village
- Location in Turkey
- Coordinates: 40°20′32″N 31°38′25″E
- Country: Turkey
- Province: Bolu
- District: Seben
- Population (2021): 96
- Time zone: UTC+3 (TRT)

Hoçaş is a village in the Seben District of Bolu Province in Turkey. Its population is 96 (2021).
