= Borucak, Kıbrıscık =

Borucak
- Village
- Location within Turkey
- Coordinates: 40°21′N 31°47′E
- Country: Turkey
- Province: Bolu
- District: Kıbrıscık
- Population (2021): 45
- Time zone: UTC+3 (TRT)

Borucak is a village in the Kıbrıscık District, Bolu Province, Turkey. Its population is 45 (2021).
