= Tokmaklar, Bolu =

Tokmaklar
- Village
- Location within Turkey
- Coordinates: 40°49′N 31°46′E
- Country: Turkey
- Province: Bolu
- District: Bolu
- Population (2021): 91
- Time zone: UTC+3 (TRT)

Tokmaklar is a village in Bolu District, Bolu Province, Turkey. As of 2021, it had a population of 91 people.
