= Deveci, Kıbrıscık =

Deveci
- Village
- Location within Turkey
- Country: Turkey
- Province: Bolu
- District: Kıbrıscık
- Population (2021): 52
- Time zone: UTC+3 (TRT)

Deveci is a village in the Kıbrıscık District, Bolu Province, Turkey. Its population is 52 (2021).
