= Musasofular, Seben =

Village in Bolu Province, Turkey

Musasofular
- Village
- Location in Turkey
- Coordinates: 40°22′N 31°31′E
- Country: Turkey
- Province: Bolu
- District: Seben
- Population (2021): 112
- Time zone: UTC+3 (TRT)

Musasofular is a village in the Seben District of Bolu Province in Turkey. Its population is 112 (2021).
