= Çatakören, Bolu =

Çatakören
- Village
- Location within Turkey
- Coordinates: 40°47′N 31°46′E
- Country: Turkey
- Province: Bolu
- District: Bolu
- Population (2021): 203
- Time zone: UTC+3 (TRT)

Çatakören is a village in the Bolu District, Bolu Province, Turkey. As of 2021, it had a population of 203 people.
