= Çamyayla, Bolu =

Çamyayla
- Village
- Location within Turkey
- Coordinates: 40.6922°N 31.6612°E
- Country: Turkey
- Province: Bolu
- District: Bolu
- Population (2021): 466
- Time zone: UTC+3 (TRT)

Çamyayla is a village in the Bolu District, Bolu Province, Turkey. As of 2021, it had a population of 466 people.
