= Fasıl, Bolu =

Fasıl
- Village
- Location within Turkey
- Country: Turkey
- Province: Bolu
- District: Bolu
- Population (2021): 168
- Time zone: UTC+3 (TRT)

Fasıl is a village in the Bolu District, Bolu Province, Turkey. As of 2021, it had a population of 168 people.
