= Sultanbey, Bolu =

Sultanbey
- Village
- Location within Turkey
- Coordinates: 40°41′37″N 31°34′08″E
- Country: Turkey
- Province: Bolu
- District: Bolu
- Population (2021): 420
- Time zone: UTC+3 (TRT)

Sultanbey is a village in Bolu District, Bolu Province, Turkey. As of 2021, it had a population of 420 people.
