= Müstakimler, Bolu =

Müstakimler
- Village
- Location within Turkey
- Coordinates: 40°49′N 31°45′E
- Country: Turkey
- Province: Bolu
- District: Bolu
- Population (2021): 73
- Time zone: UTC+3 (TRT)

Müstakimler is a village in Bolu District, Bolu Province, Turkey. As of 2021, it had a population of 73 people. It is located about 15 km North East of the City of Bolu.
