= Korucuk, Seben =

Village in Turkey

Korucuk
- Village
- Location in Turkey
- Coordinates: 40°27′52″N 31°35′47″E
- Country: Turkey
- Province: Bolu
- District: Seben
- Population (2021): 36
- Time zone: UTC+3 (TRT)

Korucuk is a village in the Seben District of Bolu Province in Turkey. Its population is 36 (2021).
