= Çukurören, Bolu =

Çukurören
- Village
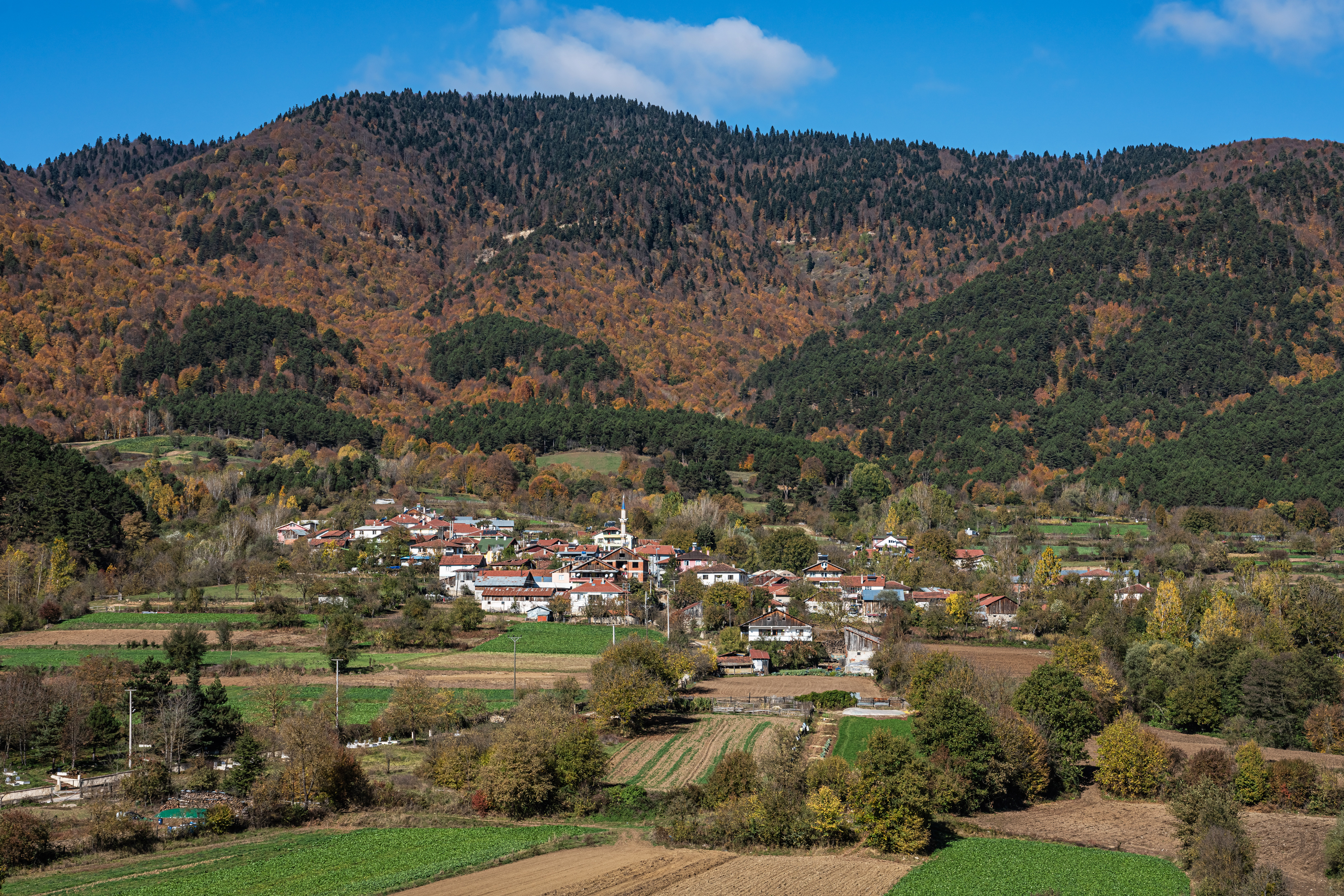

- Location within Turkey
- Coordinates: 40.811°N 31.645°E
- Country: Turkey
- Province: Bolu
- District: Bolu
- Population (2021): 199
- Time zone: UTC+3 (TRT)

Çukurören is a village in the Bolu District, Bolu Province, Turkey. As of 2021, it had a population of 199 people.
