= Piroğlu, Bolu =

Piroğlu
- Village
- Location within Turkey
- Coordinates: 40°40′N 31°27′E
- Country: Turkey
- Province: Bolu
- District: Bolu
- Population (2021): 149
- Time zone: UTC+3 (TRT)

Piroğlu is a village in Bolu District, Bolu Province, Turkey. As of 2021, it had a population of 149 people.
