= Banaz, Mengen =

Banaz
- Village
- Location within Turkey
- Coordinates: 40.9542°N 32.3442°E
- Country: Turkey
- Province: Bolu
- District: Mengen
- Population (2021): 58
- Time zone: UTC+3 (TRT)

Banaz is a village in the Mengen District, Bolu Province, Turkey. Its population is 58 (2021).
