= Yuva, Seben =

Village in Turkey

Yuva
- Village
- Location in Turkey
- Coordinates: 40.39381837°N 31.69129824°E
- Country: Turkey
- Province: Bolu
- District: Seben
- Population (2021): 126
- Time zone: UTC+3 (TRT)

Yuva is a village in the Seben District of Bolu Province in Turkey. As of 2021, it had a population of 126 people.
