= Seben =

- Municipality
- Location within Turkey
- Coordinates: 40°25′N 31°34′E
- Country: Turkey
- Province: Bolu
- District: Seben

Government
  - Mayor: Fatih Kavak (AKP)
- Population (2021): 2,395
- Time zone: UTC+3 (TRT)
- Climate: Csb
- Website: seben.bel.tr

Seben is a town in Bolu Province in the Black Sea region of Turkey, 56 km south of the town of Bolu. It is the seat of Seben District. Its population is 2,395 (2021). The mayor is Fatih Kavak (AKP).

== Places of interest ==
- The high meadows (yayla), average 1,400 m, on the flanks of Kiraz Dağı mountain.
- Bağlum Kaplıcaları, a thermal spring in the village of Kesenözü, 14 km south of Seben.
