= Deveören, Kıbrıscık =

Deveören
- Village
- Location within Turkey
- Coordinates: 40.4262°N 31.9288°E
- Country: Turkey
- Province: Bolu
- District: Kıbrıscık
- Population (2021): 156
- Time zone: UTC+3 (TRT)

Deveören is a village in the Kıbrıscık District, Bolu Province, Turkey. Its population is 156 (2021).
