= Akçaalan, Göynük =

Akçaalan
- Village
- Location within Turkey
- Coordinates: 40.4828°N 30.9437°E
- Country: Turkey
- Province: Bolu
- District: Göynük
- Population (2021): 75
- Time zone: UTC+3 (TRT)

Akçaalan is a village in the Göynük District, Bolu Province, Turkey. Its population is 75 (2021).
