= Kırha, Bolu =

Kırha
- Village
- Location within Turkey
- Country: Turkey
- Province: Bolu
- District: Bolu
- Population (2021): 104
- Time zone: UTC+3 (TRT)

Kırha is a village in the Bolu District, Bolu Province, Turkey. As of 2021, it had a population of 104 people.

In January, Kirha experiences an average of 10 days of rain, while their driest month, August, has only 2 days of rain on average.
