= Solaklar, Seben =

Village in Turkey

Solaklar
- Village
- Country: Turkey
- Province: Bolu
- District: Seben
- Population (2021): 37
- Time zone: UTC+3 (TRT)

Solaklar is a village in the Seben District of Bolu Province in Turkey. Its population is 37 (2021).
