= Bürnük, Mengen =

Bürnük
- Village
- Location within Turkey
- Coordinates: 40.9732°N 32.2098°E
- Country: Turkey
- Province: Bolu
- District: Mengen
- Population (2021): 106
- Time zone: UTC+3 (TRT)

Bürnük is a village in the Mengen District, Bolu Province, Turkey. Its population is 106 (2021).
