= Kındıra, Yeniçağa =

Village in Turkey

Kındıra
- Village
- Location within Turkey
- Country: Turkey
- Province: Bolu
- District: Yeniçağa
- Population (2021): 110
- Time zone: UTC+3 (TRT)

Kındıra is a village in the Yeniçağa District of Bolu Province in Turkey. Its population is 110 (2021).
