= Bolu District =

District of Bolu Province, Turkey

- District
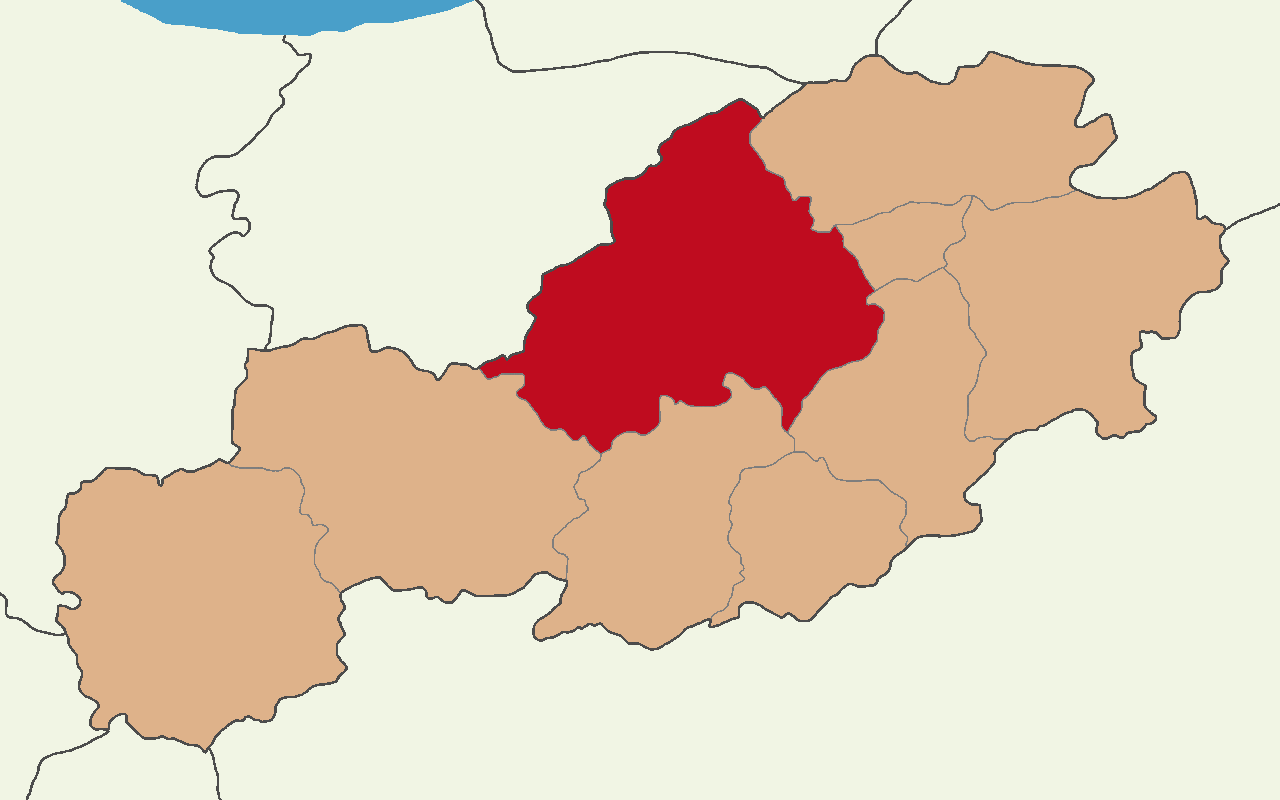
- Map showing Bolu District in Bolu Province

- Location in Turkey
- Coordinates: 40°44′N 31°36′E
- Country: Turkey
- Province: Bolu
- Seat: Bolu
- Area: 1,616 km^{2} (624 sq mi)
- Population (2021): 217,935
  - Density: 134.9/km^{2} (349.3/sq mi)
- Time zone: UTC+3 (TRT)

Bolu District (also: Merkez, meaning "central") is a district of the Bolu Province of Turkey. Its seat is the city of Bolu. Its area is 1,616 km^{2}, and its population is 217,935 (2021).

== Composition ==
There are two municipalities in Bolu District:

- Bolu
- Karacasu

There are 112 villages in Bolu District:

- Afşar
- Ağaçcılar
- Ahmetler
- Akçaalan
- Alıçören
- Aşağıçamlı
- Aşağıkuzören
- Avdan
- Aydıncık
- Bağışlar
- Bahçeköy
- Bakırlı
- Baltalı
- Banaz
- Belkaraağaç
- Berk
- Bozarmut
- Bünüş
- Bürnük
- Çampınar
- Çamyayla
- Çanakçılar
- Çatakören
- Çaygökpınar
- Çayırköy
- Çepni
- Çobankaya
- Çömlekçiler
- Çukurören
- Değirmenbeli
- Değirmenderesi
- Demirciler
- Dereceören
- Doğancı
- Elmalık
- Ericek
- Fasıl
- Gökpınar
- Gölcük
- Gölköy
- Gövem
- Güneyfelekettin
- Hamzabey
- Hıdırşeyhler
- Ilıcakınık
- Işıklar
- Kandamış
- Karamanlar
- Karca
- Ketenler
- Kındıra
- Kırha
- Kızılağıl
- Kolköy
- Köprücüler
- Kozlu
- Küplüce
- Kuzfındık
- Kuzörendağlı
- Kuzörenemirler
- Merkeşler
- Mesciler
- Mesciçele
- Muratlar
- Musluklar
- Müstakimler
- Nuhlar
- Oğulduruk
- Okçular
- Ömerler
- Örencik
- Pelitcik
- Pirahmetler
- Piroğlu
- Rüzgarlar
- Saççılar
- Saraycık
- Sazakkınık
- Sazakşeyhler
- Sebenardı
- Semerciler
- Sultan
- Sultanbey
- Susuzkınık
- Tarakçı
- Taşçılar
- Taşoluk
- Tatlar
- Tekkedere
- Tetemeçele
- Tokmaklar
- Topardıç
- Ulumescit
- Vakıfgeçitveren
- Yakabayat
- Yakuplar
- Yayladınlar
- Yazıören
- Yeniakçakavak
- Yeniçaydurt
- Yenicepınar
- Yenigeçitveren
- Yenigüney
- Yeniköy
- Yenipelitçik
- Yenisefa
- Yeşilçele
- Yeşilköy
- Yolçatı
- Yukarıçamlı
- Yumrukaya
- Yuva
