= Bünüş, Bolu =

Bünüş
- Village
- Location within Turkey
- Coordinates: 40.7774°N 31.8849°E
- Country: Turkey
- Province: Bolu
- District: Bolu
- Population (2021): 71
- Time zone: UTC+3 (TRT)

Bünüş is a village in the Bolu District, Bolu Province, Turkey. As of 2021, its population was 71.
