= Yumrukaya, Bolu =

Yumrukaya
- Village
- Location within Turkey
- Coordinates: 40°43′4.73243″N 31°29′47.13205″E
- Country: Turkey
- Province: Bolu
- District: Bolu
- Population (2021): 704
- Time zone: UTC+3 (TRT)

Yumrukaya is a village in Bolu District, Bolu Province, Turkey. As of 2021, it had a population of 704 people.
