= Banaz, Bolu =

Banaz
- Village
- Location within Turkey
- Coordinates: 40.8106°N 31.7339°E
- Country: Turkey
- Province: Bolu
- District: Bolu
- Population (2021): 272
- Time zone: UTC+3 (TRT)

Banaz is a village in the Bolu District, Bolu Province, Turkey. As of 2021, its population was 272.
