= Bozarmut, Bolu =

Bozarmut
- Village
- Location within Turkey
- Coordinates: 40.6678°N 31.8950°E
- Country: Turkey
- Province: Bolu
- District: Bolu
- Population (2021): 113
- Time zone: UTC+3 (TRT)

Bozarmut is a village in the Bolu District, Bolu Province, Turkey. As of 2021, its population was 113.
