= Yuva, Bolu =

Yuva
- Village
- Location within Turkey
- Coordinates: 40.76527747°N 31.7879018°E
- Country: Turkey
- Province: Bolu
- District: Bolu
- Population (2021): 709
- Time zone: UTC+3 (TRT)

Yuva is a village in Bolu District, Bolu Province, Turkey. As of 2021, it had a population of 709 people.
