= Baltalı, Bolu =

Baltalı
- Village
- Location in Turkey
- Coordinates: 40.7328°N 31.8389°E
- Country: Turkey
- Province: Bolu
- District: Bolu
- Population (2021): 175
- Time zone: UTC+3 (TRT)

Baltalı is a village in Bolu District, Bolu Province, Turkey. As of 2021, it had a population of 175 people.
