= Kındıra, Bolu =

Kındıra
- Village
- Location within Turkey
- Country: Turkey
- Province: Bolu
- District: Bolu
- Population (2021): 687
- Time zone: UTC+3 (TRT)

Kındıra is a village in the Bolu District, Bolu Province, Turkey. As of 2021, it had a population of 687 people.
