= Akçaalan, Bolu =

Akçaalan
- Village
- Location in Turkey
- Coordinates: 40.6708°N 31.4300°E
- Country: Turkey
- Province: Bolu
- District: Bolu
- Population (2021): 133
- Time zone: UTC+3 (TRT)

Akçaalan is a village in Bolu District, Bolu Province, Turkey. As of 2021, it had a population of 133 people.
