= Bünüş, Gerede =

Bünüş
- Village
- Location within Turkey
- Coordinates: 40.6863°N 32.3094°E
- Country: Turkey
- Province: Bolu
- District: Gerede
- Population (2021): 60
- Time zone: UTC+3 (TRT)

Bünüş is a village in the Gerede District, Bolu Province, Turkey. Its population is 60 (2021).
