= Adaköy, Yeniçağa =

Village in Turkey

Adaköy
- Village
- Location in Turkey
- Coordinates: 40.7963°N 32.0434°E
- Country: Turkey
- Province: Bolu
- District: Yeniçağa
- Population (2021): 145
- Time zone: UTC+3 (TRT)

Adaköy is a village in the Yeniçağa District of Bolu Province in Turkey. As of 2021, it had a population of 145 people.
