= Kıbrıscık =

- Municipality
- Location within Turkey
- Coordinates: 40°24′N 31°51′E
- Country: Turkey
- Province: Bolu
- District: Kıbrıscık

Government
  - Mayor: Emin Tekemen (CHP)
- Population (2021): 1,229
- Time zone: UTC+3 (TRT)
- Climate: Csb
- Website: www.kibriscik.bel.tr

Kıbrıscık is a small town in Bolu Province of the Black Sea region of northwestern Turkey. It is the seat of Kıbrıscık District. Its population is 1,229 (2021). The mayor is Emin Tekemen (CHP).

This was a village linked to the East Roman town of Bithynia (as Bolu and Galatia was then named) and which was brought under Ottoman Empire control at the same time as Bolu. The name comes from the river Kyberis (current Cuma Deresi near Deveoren and Nadas Villages).
