= Karaköy, Kıbrıscık =

Karaköy
- Village
- Location within Turkey
- Coordinates: 40.4275°N 31.7964°E
- Country: Turkey
- Province: Bolu
- District: Kıbrıscık
- Population (2021): 188
- Time zone: UTC+3 (TRT)

Karaköy is a village in the Kıbrıscık District, Bolu Province, Turkey. Its population is 188 (2021).
