= Bürnük, Bolu =

Bürnük
- Village
- Location within Turkey
- Coordinates: 40.7341°N 31.7847°E
- Country: Turkey
- Province: Bolu
- District: Bolu
- Population (2021): 252
- Time zone: UTC+3 (TRT)

Bürnük is a village in the Bolu District, Bolu Province, Turkey. As of 2021, it had a population of 252 people.
