= Can Atalay =

Turkish politician

Şerafettin Can Atalay
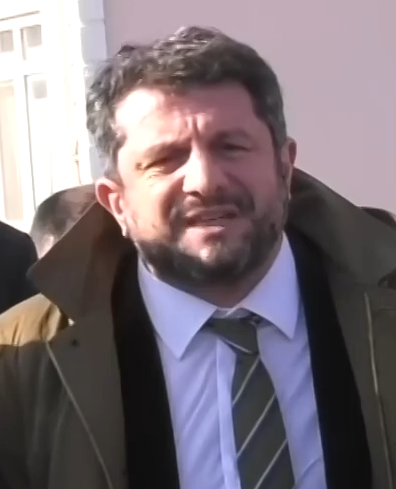

Member of the Grand National Assembly
- Constituency: Hatay (2023)

Personal details
- Born: 24 March 1976 (age 50) Istanbul, Turkey
- Party: Workers' Party of Turkey
- Education: Marmara University

Şerafettin Can Atalay is a Turkish lawyer, activist, and politician.

He served as a lawyer in many social cases in Turkey, such as the Soma mine disaster, Ermenek mine accident, 2016 Adana student dormitory fire, Çorlu train derailment, and freedom of thought cases of journalists and writers. He served as the lawyer of Taksim Solidarity, which was established against the attempt to build a shopping mall in Taksim's Gezi Park. In 2022 he was convicted to 18 years in prison during the Gezi Park lawsuit. During the 2023 Turkish parliamentary elections he was elected as a member of parliament for the Hatay province for the Workers' Party of Turkey. He is currently serving his sentence in the Marmara Prison.

== Early life and education ==
He was born 1976 in Istanbul. He is the only son of a banker mother and accountant father. He is the nephew of Şerafettin Atalay, who was killed in a political assassination in 1971 while he was the Amasya Provincial Chairman of the Workers' Party of Turkey. He received his first name, "Şerafettin", from his uncle. Most of his childhood was spent in Kadıköy. Due to his parents' background, he had the opportunity to chat with notable literary figures such as Aziz Nesin, Yaşar Kemal and Can Yücel at a young age.

He received higher education at Marmara University Faculty of Law. After graduation, he briefly worked in the legal department of NTV.

== Career ==
He served as the lawyer of journalist Ahmet Şık, who was tried for his investigations about the secret organization of the Gülen movement in public institutions. He took part in the protests to liberate Şık's book, The Imam's Army and to publish it under the name "Dokunan Yanar".

He took part in the board of directors of the Social Rights Association. After the Soma mine disaster in 2014, which resulted in the death of 301 miners, he took on the representation of the Soma case, followed by the representation of the Ermenek mine accident. In 2016, he represented the families of the victims in the Adana student dormitory fire, where 24 children were injured and where 11 children died, and in the legal proceedings related to the Çorlu train derailment that occurred on July 8, 2018, representing the families of those who died. In 2020, he took on the representation of the families of workers in the 2020 Hendek fireworks factory explosion, which resulted in the injury of 127 and death of 7 workers. As the lawyer for the Chamber of Architects, he defended the Validebağ volunteers in their struggle against the construction in Validebağ Grove in Istanbul. He was among the organizers of the campaign against the demolition of Emek Cinema in Istanbul, and successfully invalidated the plans for Gezi Park at the Council of State.

In his role as an advocate, he represented the Taksim Solidarity, an organization formed in opposition to the initiative to construct a shopping mall in Gezi Park. He was implicated as a defendant in the Gezi trials and subsequently detained. He was acquitted in two separate cases related to the trial. However, on April 25, 2022, during the trial for the charge of "attempting to overthrow the Government of the Republic of Turkey," held at the 13th Heavy Penal Court in Silivri, Istanbul, he was sentenced to 18 years of imprisonment. The Court of Cassation upheld the verdict on September 28, 2023.

== Election as a member of parliament ==
Atalay participated as a parliamentary candidate for the Workers' Party of Turkey for the Hatay province in the 2023 Turkish parliamentary elections while detained in the Marmara Prison in Silivri, Istanbul and was elected. Following his election as a member of parliament, his application for release was unanimously rejected by the 3rd Criminal Chamber of the Court of Cassation (Turkish: Yargıtay) on 13 July 2023. The appeal against this decision was also rejected by the 4th Criminal Chamber of the Court of Cassation by a majority vote on 17 July 2023. Subsequently, on 20 July 2023, Atalay filed an appeal with the Constitutional Court (Turkish: Anayasa Mahkemesi), claiming that his rights to a fair trial, voting, being elected, engaging in political activities, and personal freedom and security had been violated.

On 25 October 2023, the Constitutional Court ruled that Can Atalay's "right to be elected and engage in political activities" and "personal freedom and security" were violated. The Istanbul 13th Heavy Penal Court forwarded the file to the 3rd Criminal Chamber of the Court of Cassation to evaluate the Constitutional Court's violation decision. On 8 November 2023, the 3rd Criminal Chamber of the Court of Cassation issued a final verdict on Can Atalay, stating that he had received a definitive conviction. Although this decision had not been read in the Grand National Assembly of Turkey, Can Atalay's parliamentary membership was definitively revoked. The 3rd Criminal Chamber of the Court of Cassation further decided that the Constitutional Court exceeded its authority by reviewing a final judgment of the court and violated the Constitution. As a result, they upheld Can Atalay's imprisonment and decided to file a criminal complaint with the Prosecutor's Office against the Constitutional Court members who issued the violation decision.

On 1st October 2026, the first day of the new legislative year of the Turkish Grand National Assembly, Atalay announced a 24 hour hunger strike, in protest of being jailed even though elected as a member of parliament by the people of Hatay. On 17 November 2026, the European Court of Human Rights (ECtHR) ruled that he should be released immediately from prison and allowed to take back his seat at parliament.
