= Dörtdivan =

- Municipality
- Location in Turkey
- Coordinates: 40°43′N 32°04′E
- Country: Turkey
- Province: Bolu
- District: Dörtdivan

Government
  - Mayor: Hamza Efe (AKP)
- Population (2021): 2,736
- Time zone: UTC+3 (TRT)
- Website: www.dortdivan.bel.tr

Dörtdivan is a town in the Bolu Province in the Black Sea region of Turkey. It is the seat of Dörtdivan District. Its population is 2,736 (2021). The mayor is Hamza Efe (AKP).

Dörtdivan is a small town deep in the countryside.

The area has been occupied for a long time. Turkish presence in the area dates back to the Oghuz Turks in 1074, but the village of Dörtdivan was founded by the Seljuk Turks in 1197. The Seljuks ruled through local lords and the name Dörtdivan, meaning four hamlets, dates from this period. The town was later absorbed into the Ottoman Empire, when it thrived as a local centre of schooling and administration.

== Places of interest ==
- Ruins of a Byzantine castle in the village of Yağbaşlar.
- There are also a number of tombs of sufi mystics, mineral water springs, meadows and places for walking.

== Notable natives ==
- 19th century poet Hilmi of Dörtdivan.
- Dörtdivan also claims to be the birthplace of the legendary Köroğlu, of the Epic of Köroğlu.
