= 2025 Kartalkaya hotel fire =

Fire in Bolu Province, Turkey

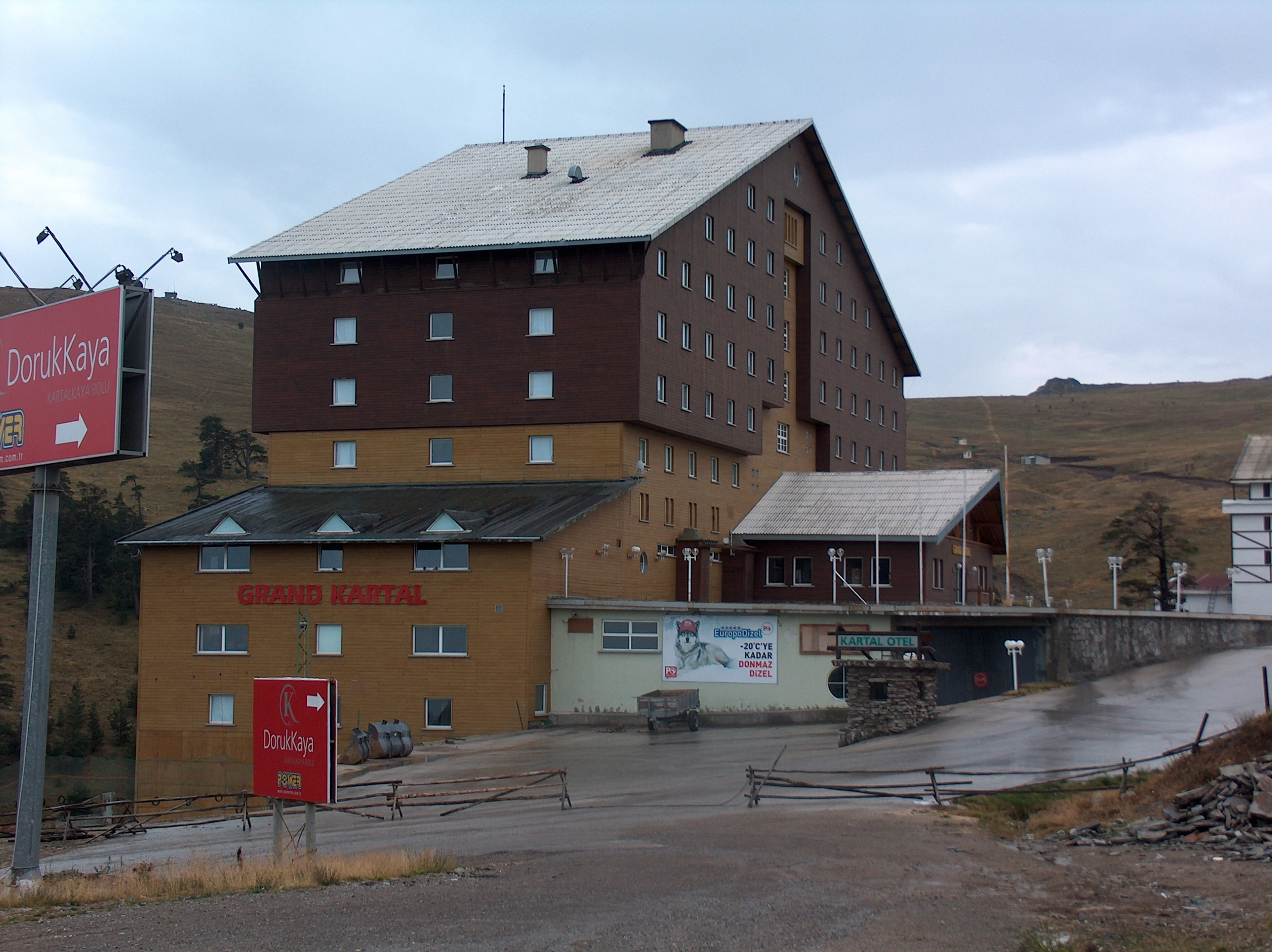
- Grand Kartal Hotel in 2007
- Date: 21 January 2025
- Time: 3:27 a.m. (UTC+03:00)
- Duration: 12 hours
- Venue: Bolu Grand Kartal Hotel
- Location: Kartalkaya, Bolu Province, Turkey; 40°35′24″N 31°48′26″E
- Type: Structure fire
- Deaths: 78
- Injuries: 51

On 21 January 2025, a fire occurred at the Grand Kartal Hotel at the Kartalkaya ski resort in Bolu Province, Turkey; at least 78 people died, 51 others were injured. The fire started in the hotel's fourth floor kitchen/restaurant section. It occurred during the Turkish winter school break, when the hotel was 80–90% full. The scale of the fire and number of deaths were exacerbated by the absence of smoke detectors, automatic sprinklers, functioning fire alarms, functioning emergency exit lights, and other fire safety measures. Rescue efforts were hampered by freezing weather and the hotel's remote location; firefighters did not arrive until over an hour after the fire was reported. Most victims died from suffocation.

== Background ==
The Grand Kartal Hotel was built in 1998 by Mazhar Murtezaoğlu, the founder of the Kartalkaya Ski Resort. Inspired by the ski resorts in Switzerland, Murtezaoğlu built two hotels in the region, the Kartal Hotel (built in 1978) and the Grand Kartal Hotel. After Murtezaoğlu's death in 2019, his son-in-law Halit Ergül took over the management of the Grand Kartal Hotel.

The 12-story hotel had 161 rooms and 350 beds, and was last renovated in 2015. The fire took place during the winter school break, when Kartalkaya had an increased number of visitors, with 80–90% of the hotel occupied.

== Fire ==
The fire was first reported at around 3:27 a.m. on 21 January 2025 TRT (UTC+03:00) at the Grand Kartal Hotel, which was hosting 238 guests, though several survivors and witnesses smelled smoke and saw flames as early as an hour prior at 2:30 a.m. The fire began in the hotel's kitchen/restaurant section on the fourth floor, before spreading upwards. The newspaper Sabah reported that the fire started due to hot oil on the grill catching fire during breakfast preparations. It was also claimed that the flames spread after the wrong intervention of the kitchen staff by pouring water. Another media outlet, citing an unofficial expert report, suggested that the fire originated from a wiring fault in the grill, however the findings were based solely on surveillance footage, with no evidence collected from kitchen staff. The fire's spread was reportedly exacerbated by the hotel's wooden exterior cladding.

According to witnesses, no fire-detection system or fire alarms activated, leaving panicked guests attempting to escape via pitch-black smoke-filled corridors. A survivor complained that the hotel lacked any fire safety measures, such as smoke detectors or fire stairs. The Bolu engineers' and architects' union attributed the rapid spread of the fire to a lack of automatic sprinklers, which were mandatory and were to be installed in 2008 but were still absent, and the head of the Ankara Chamber of Architects reported from the site that there were no functioning emergency exit lights.

Some guests tied together sheets and blankets to descend from their rooms through windows. Three people jumped from upper floors, only one of whom survived the fall. The intensity of the fire prevented onlookers from gaining access to the building. A hotel employee told CNN Turk that hotel management ordered staff not to alert guests or authorities while they attempted to manage the situation internally.

Kartalkaya has no dedicated firefighting service. Approximately 267 emergency personnel, 30 fire trucks, and 28 ambulances were deployed to the scene from farther afield. Bolu Province governor Abdulaziz Aydın said they were delayed over an hour until 4:15 a.m. by freezing weather and the hotel's distance from Bolu municipality. The hotel's cliffside position also affected firefighting efforts. A field hospital was constructed nearby. Other hotels at the resort were precautionarily evacuated. According to Turkish interior minister Ali Yerlikaya, the hotel had two fire escapes. The fire was extinguished 12 hours later. Staff reported rescuing 30–35 people. Firefighters used ladders to rescue 50 people trapped in their rooms through windows in the hotel's front façade.

It was claimed that Turkish Disaster and Emergency Management Presidency (AFAD) teams conducting search operations at the Grand Kartal Hotel wanted to stay at the hotel to rest, but the hotel management demanded a fee for accommodation.

== Casualties ==
At least 78 people died in the fire, including at least two who jumped out of the building "in a panic", while 51 others were injured, with one in serious condition. A majority of the deaths were likely caused by suffocation. At least 36 of the fatalities were children, according to local media reports, and in some cases members of the same family died, with one family losing more than ten members.

Among the deaths were Sözcü writer and former Orduspor president Nedim Türkmen with his wife and two children; 10-year-old Fenerbahçe S.K. swimmer Vedia Nil Apak and her mother; and the Özyeğin University dean of the faculty of business Atakan Yalçın. At least two hotel employees, including a chef, were confirmed dead. Seventy-seven victims were Turkish citizens and one was a Georgian national who worked as a babysitter, dying along with her two wards and their mother who were guests at the hotel. Due to a lack of morgue capacity in local hospitals, the bodies of the dead were temporarily placed in a refrigerator truck.

== Cause ==
=== Inspection and certification ===
Turkish President Recep Tayyip Erdoğan's AKP government exchanged accusations of blame with the local Bolu municipality, which is controlled by Turkey's main opposition party, the Republican People's Party.

The Turkish Ministry of Tourism assigns inspectors who inspect tourism investments and enterprises. This includes inspecting safety measures. A 3 April 2012 regulation published in the Official Gazette of the Republic of Turkey reduced the fire safety inspection rights of municipal fire brigades, transferring all matters requiring interpretation or clarification to the Turkish Ministry of Environment.

After the fire, Turkish Minister of Tourism Mehmet Ersoy nonetheless claimed that fire brigades were responsible for issuing fire competence certificates, and that local fire brigades are the only authorities authorized to inspect fire safety measures. He later changed his explanation, saying that the Ministry of Culture and Tourism lacked authority to license or oversee the building, and that "If it is within the municipality's jurisdiction, the responsibility falls to the municipality. If it is outside the municipality, it falls under the special provincial administration." He added that Bolu municipality's fire department found "no negative situation regarding fire competence" at the hotel during inspections in 2021 and 2024. Mayor Tanju Özcan countered, saying that the fire department has not certified the hotel since 2007, at which time Bolu was an AKP-run municipality and 12 years before he became mayor. Turkish journalist İsmail Saymaz confirmed that Grand Kartal Hotel received no fire safety certificate from Bolu municipality, and said that it re-applied on 25 December 2024 but withdrew the application. Özcan added that the municipality is not allowed to issue licenses for hotels in the Kartalkaya region. He accused Ersoy of falsely deflecting responsibility. Özcan said "the hotel is outside Bolu's city limits, so the Ministry of Tourism is in charge".

On 22 January 2025, state-owned news channel TRT Haber claimed that the Bolu municipality issued a fire conformity certificate to the hotel's restaurant 19 days before the incident. However, the cited document was not a license and only covered a 70 m² surrounding cafe but not the hotel's kitchen where the fire started or the large overall building.

The Bolu representative of the Union of Chambers of Turkish Engineers and Architects, Erol Perçin, claimed that current fire regulations only vaguely state that "guest and employee safety must be ensured". He called for stricter laws.

=== Investigation ===
A team of six prosecutors and five experts was ordered to investigate the fire. Fourteen people, including the hotel's owner, the hotel's architect, the hotel's kitchen staff, Deputy Mayor Sedat Gülener, and Deputy Fire Department Director Kenan Coşkun were detained for questioning. Initial reports said the fire likely began in the hotel's restaurant. Seven people were also detained in Istanbul and Nevşehir for illegally sharing personal details of the fire victims online in order to contact relatives of the deceased and make insulting statements.

Bolu mayor Özcan said that the municipality did not know whether the hotel had a fire escape or a fire sprinkler system, because Kartalkaya was outside the city limits. Union representative Perçin agreed that fire safety systems were absent, shown by the way the fire had propagated.

Journalist Ismail Saymaz sent a tweet based on a 16 December 2024 document which said that the Bolu municipal fire brigade inspected the hotel on request and found seven deficiencies. The building's second emergency exit door and fire doors were unsuitable, and the building's alarm was broken. Saymaz said that the floor count exceeded the zoning plan and that during certification, there was an unlicensed floor reachable by stairs but not by elevator. Minister Ersoy said that the Bolu municipality should have reported the hotel's eight defects.

On 28 January, the Grand National Assembly of Turkey unanimously approved the establishment of an investigative commission into the fire composed of 22 members and with a duration of three months. The commission was formed in March 2025, with Erzurum member of parliament Selami Altınok as chairman. A trial involving 32 defendants began in Bolu on 7 July 2025. On 31 October 2025, the hotel owner was sentenced to life imprisonment for "severe negligence" over safety measures at the hotel. Ten other defendants also received a life sentence.

== Responses ==
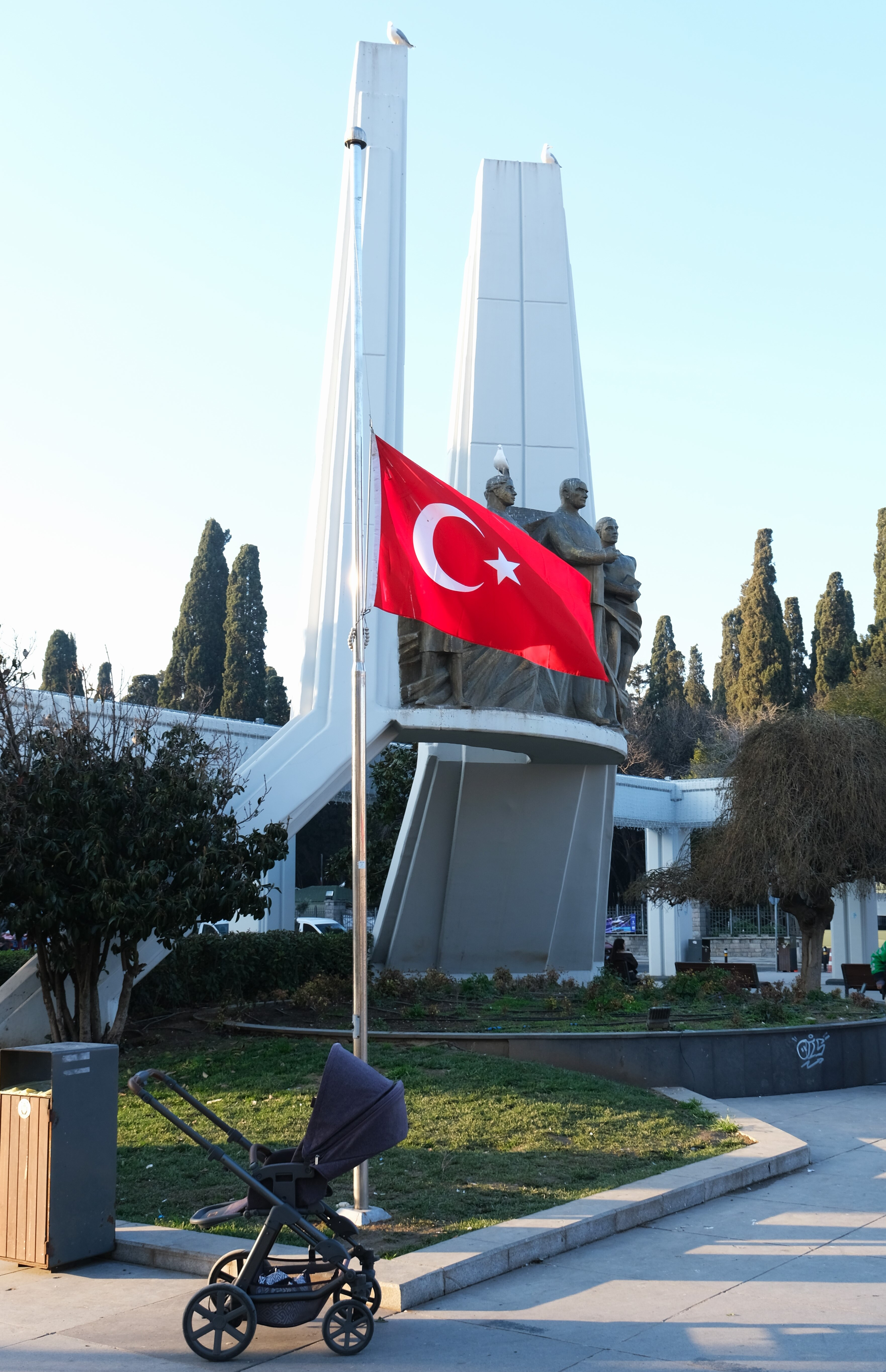
Turkish flag at half-mast following the declaration of national mourning, Bakırköy, Istanbul

On 21 January 2025, Turkish Radio and Television Supreme Council (RTÜK) chairman Ebubekir Şahin imposed a broadcasting ban on the fire. In response, the Workers' Party of Turkey's lawyers filed an objection to the decision. The ban was lifted the next day, although the RTÜK urged journalists to report with "sensitivity given the gravity of the tragedy."

On the same day, the Turkish Football Federation announced a minute of silence would be held before all competitions and that all club members would wear black armbands during matches on 24–27 January 2025 in memory of the citizens who died in the fire. A minute of silence was also held for the victims of the fire before a 2024–25 UEFA Europa League match that Beşiktaş hosted against Spanish team Athletic Bilbao at Beşiktaş Stadium.

Turkish president Recep Tayyip Erdoğan declared 22 January 2025 a day of national mourning and ordered all flags at government buildings and Turkish embassies abroad lowered to half-mast. On that day, he visited Bolu municipality and attended the funeral of eight relatives of former AKP MP Mehmet Güner who died in the fire, including his daughter, son-in-law, four grandchildren and other relatives. A day of mourning was also announced in Northern Cyprus.

Özgür Özel, leader of the opposition Republican People's Party, said that there is "no excuse for such a high number of deaths in 2025" while visiting the site of the fire.

Condolences were sent by Algeria, Armenia, Azerbaijan, Bahrain, Belarus, Belgium, Bosnia and Herzegovina, Brunei, China, Colombia, Croatia, the Czech Republic, Egypt, Ethiopia, the European Union, France, Germany, Georgia, Greece, the International Organization of Turkic Culture, Iran, Iraq, Jordan, Kazakhstan, Kosovo, Kyrgyzstan, Kuwait, Nigeria, Northern Cyprus, the Organization of Turkic States, Poland, Qatar, Pakistan, Russia, Rwanda, Saudi Arabia, Serbia, Slovakia, Slovenia, Somalia, Syria, Ukraine, the United Arab Emirates, Uzbekistan, Venezuela, and Vietnam.

== See also ==
- Gayrettepe nightclub fire, a 2024 building fire in Turkey in which 29 people died
- Adana student dormitory fire, a 2016 building fire in which 11 secondary school students and a caregiver died
