= Köroğlu Mountains =

Northern Turkey mountain range

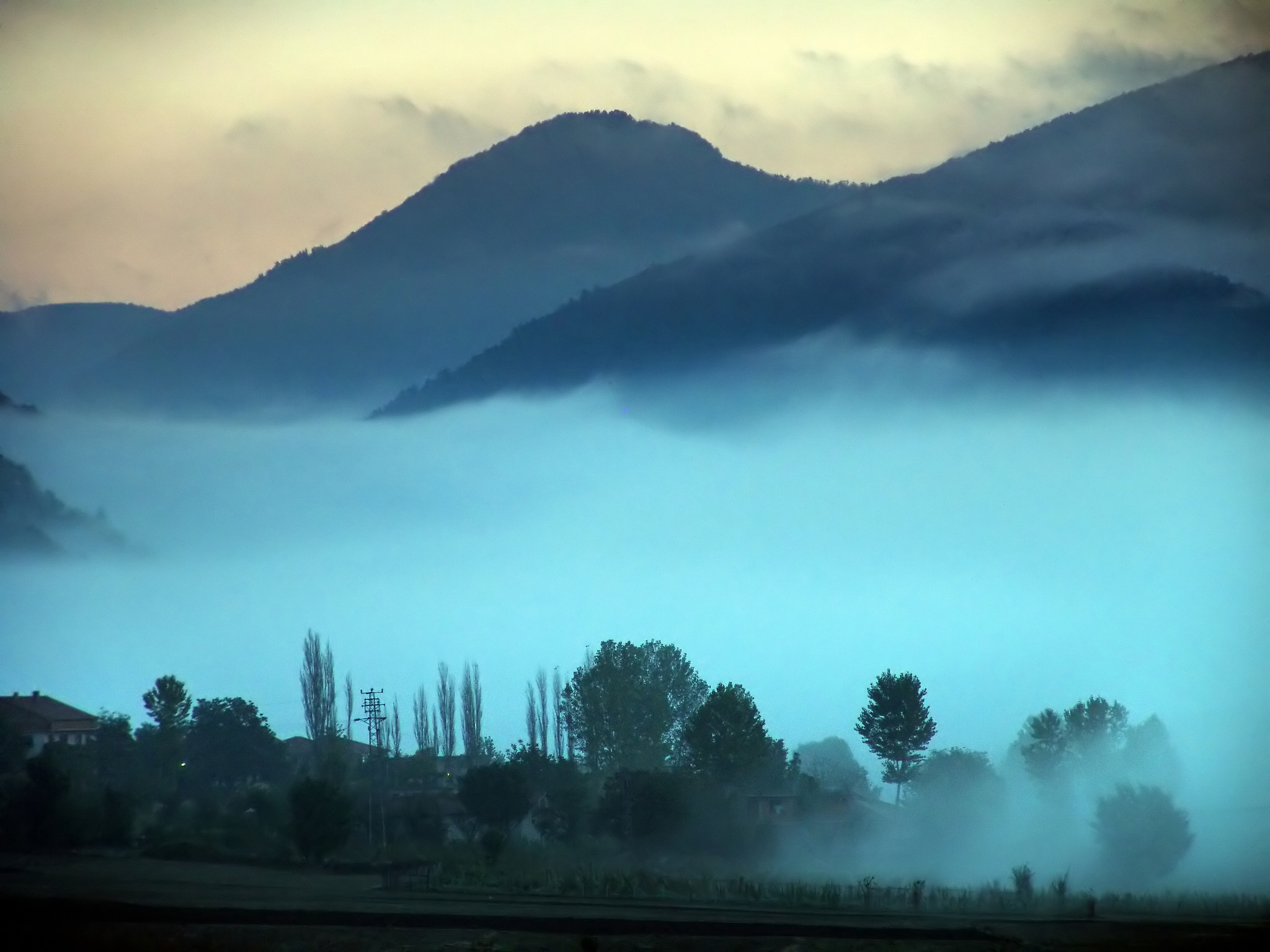
- Mist in Bolu, near the Köroğlu Mountains

Highest point
- Peak: Köroğlu Tepesi
- Elevation: 2,499 m (8,199 ft)
- Coordinates: 40°40′0″N 31°47′0″E

Dimensions
- Length: 400 km (250 mi)

Naming
- Native name: Köroğlu Dağları (Turkish)

Geography
- Country: Turkey

The Köroğlu Mountains (Turkish: Köroğlu Dağları) are a mountain range situated in the northern Turkey, north of Ankara. It rises along the North Anatolian Fault and the Black Sea.

This range crosses the provinces of Bolu, Çankırı and Çorum, and its limits are Sakarya River, to the west, and Kızılırmak River, to the east.

The highest place, situated south of Bolu, is an andesitic formation, constituted by a plateau where is situated the highest point of this range, Köroğlu Tepesi, at 2,499 m (8,200 ft) above sea level.

Two ski resorts near Köroğlu Tepesi were inaugurated: Kartalkaya and Sarialan, with elevations between 1,900 m (6,233 ft) and 2,378 m (7,802 ft).

On 21 January 2025, a fire broke out at the Grand Kartal Hotel in Kartalkaya. At least 78 people were killed, while 51 others were injured.
