= Gayrettepe nightclub fire =

2024 fire in Istanbul, Turkey

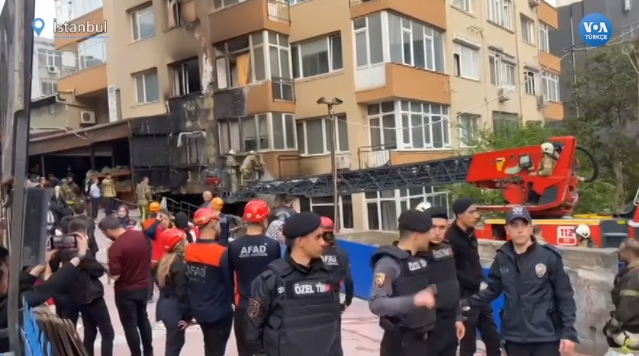
- The building in the aftermath of the fire
- Date: 2 April 2024
- Location: Masquerade Club, Beşiktaş, Istanbul, Turkey; 41°3′56″N 29°0′30″E
- Type: Fire
- Deaths: 29
- Injuries: 8

On 2 April 2024, a fire at the Masquerade Club, in the Gayrettepe neighborhood of Beşiktaş, Istanbul, Turkey, killed 29 people.

== Background ==
The club was located on Gonenoglu Street, a busy area of the Gayrettepe neighbourhood. Its operating license was first granted in 1987 and last renewed in 2018. It was closed for a month-long renovation coinciding with Ramadan, and scheduled to reopen on 10 April. The club spanned the basement and ground level below a 16-story residential building. The building's manager said that the venue of the club was originally designed as a cinema. The club had a capacity of 4,000, and ran a mixture of deep house and hip hop nights with live music and multiple stages.

== Fire ==
According to the city governor's office, the fire began at 12:47 (09:47 GMT), reached the third floor, and was then extinguished in the late afternoon. The fire killed 29 people, while at least eight people were injured, seven seriously. Victims were mostly renovation workers, but included a DJ and a cook. Turkish media said that the "labyrinth"-like layout of the renovated area hampered escape efforts.

Authorities cordoned off the vicinity of the building, while around 20 fire trucks and ambulances were dispatched to the area. Neighborhood electricity and gas were also precautionarily shut off.

== Investigation ==
Five people were detained, including club managers and one renovation manager. A total of 22 individuals were indicted, including the nightclub's owners, fire officials and 13 incumbent and former officials from the Beşiktaş municipality.

Interior Minister Ali Yerlikaya tweeted that an investigation had been opened shortly after the fire was extinguished. Mayor of Istanbul Ekrem İmamoğlu said that the club had not applied for the proper construction permit. On 3 April, Yeni Şafak, citing fire department officials, reported that the fire was likely caused by sparks from a welding machine used to install sound insulation and decoration material, which then caused an explosion that ignited other construction materials.

== Reactions ==
Mayor İmamoğlu expressed condolences to the victims of the fire. Turkish President Recep Tayyip Erdoğan was also briefed on the incident over a phone call by Ali Yerlikaya.

== See also ==
- 2025 Kartalkaya hotel fire, in Turkey in which at least 78 people died.
