= Koroghlu (opera) =

- Opera by Uzeyir Hajibeyov
- Native title: Koroğlu
- Librettist: Mammed Said Ordubadi; Heydar Ismayilov
- Language: Azerbaijani
- Based on: Epic of Koroghlu
- Premiere: April 30, 1937; Azerbaijan State Academic Opera and Ballet Theater

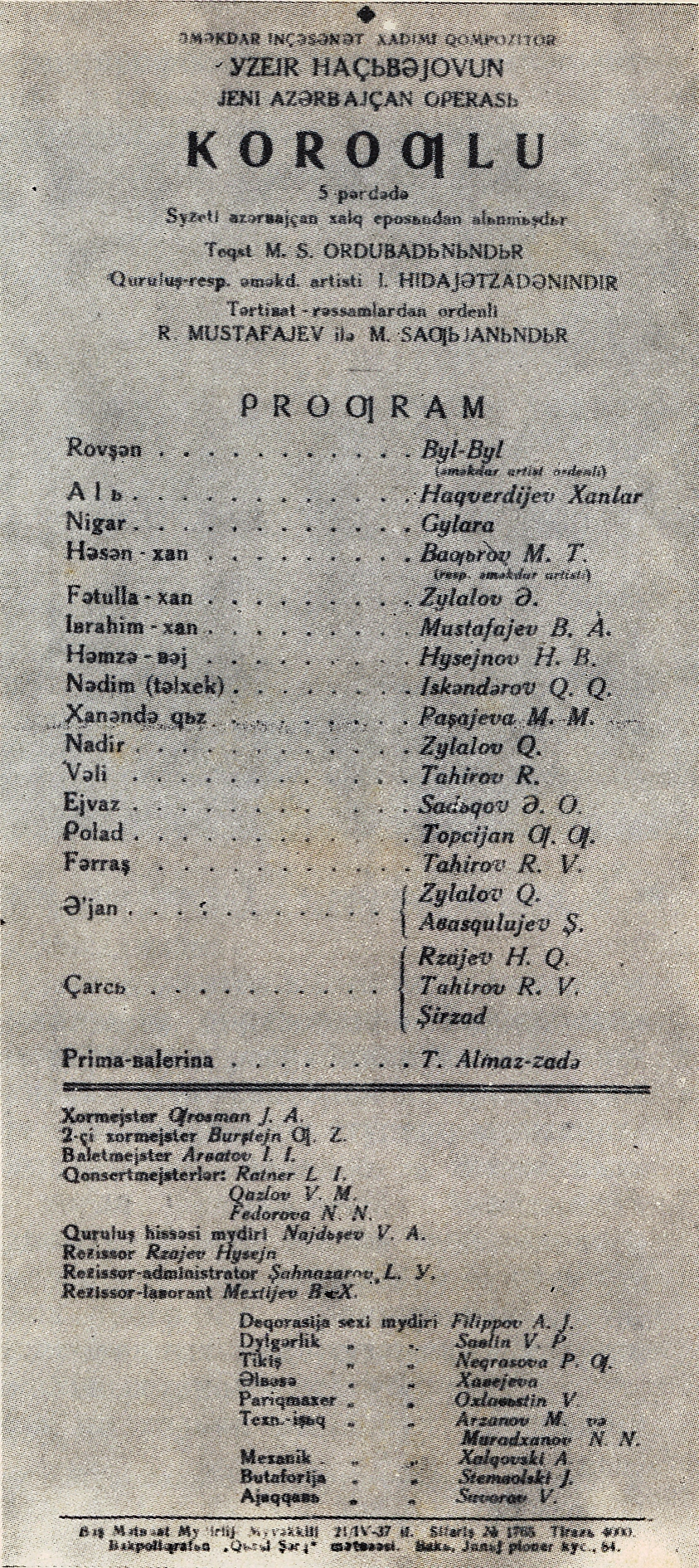
Program for the 1937 premiere of Koroghlu

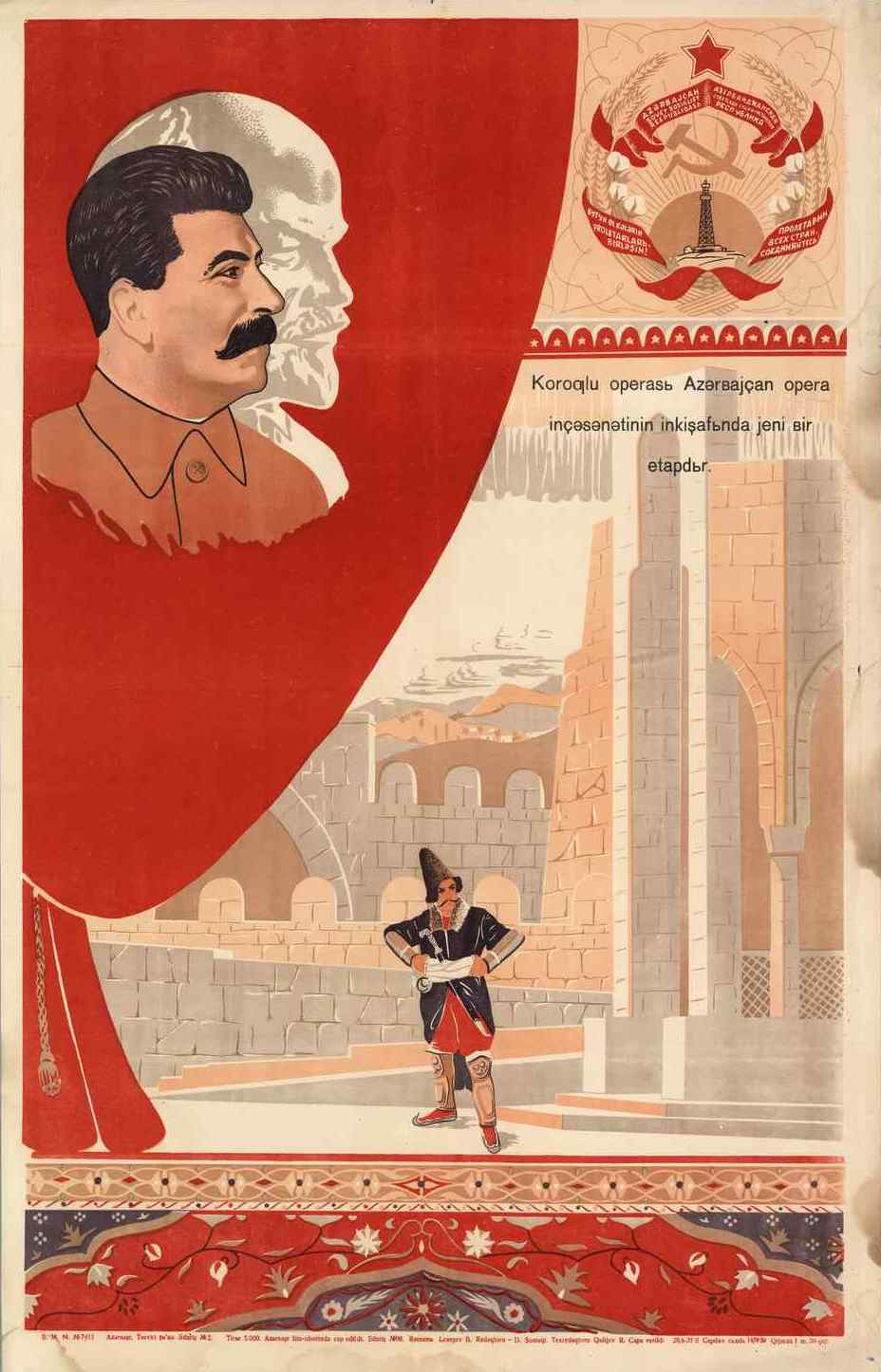
Poster of Koroghlu, Azerbaijan 1939

Koroghlu (Azerbaijani: Koroğlu; literally, The Blind Man's Son) is an opera in five acts by Uzeyir Hajibeyov to a libretto in Azerbaijani by Habib Ismayilov, with poetry by Mammed Said Ordubadi. The libretto is based on episodes from the Epic of Koroghlu, a heroic legend prominent in the oral traditions of the Turkic peoples. The opera premiered on April 30, 1937, at the Azerbaijan State Opera and Ballet Theater.

== Background and performance history ==
Koroghlu was written in 1936 and first performed on April 30, 1937 at the Azerbaijan State Opera and Ballet Theater in Baku, conducted by the composer with Bulbul and Gulyara Iskenderova in leading roles. It was Hajibeyov's last complete opera and is described by Yury Gabay in the Grove Dictionary of Music and Musicians as his most important work, winning him a USSR State Prize in 1941. The opera had its first Moscow performance in 1938 and received its first complete staging in Russian in 1943.

Koroghlu is still frequently performed by the Azerbaijan State Opera and Ballet Theater. In the late 1980s its overture became an unofficial anthem for the Azerbaijan movement for independence from the Soviet Union and is still often used to open concerts in Azerbaijan.

== Roles ==
Roles, voice types
Role	Voice type
Ali, old man, horse-holder of Hasan khan	bass
Rovshan (afterwards Koroghlu), his son	tenor
Nigar, Rovshan's beloved	soprano
Eyvaz, her brother	tenor
Hasan khan	baritone
Ibrahim khan, confidant of Hasan khan	bass
Hamza bey, confidant of Hasan khan	tenor
Ehsan pasha	tenor
Polad, Hasan khan's servant	tenor
Hasan khan's jester	tenor
Court singer (woman)	soprano
Nadir, peasant	tenor
Veli, peasant	tenor
3 heralds	tenor
Farrash	tenor
Commanders	tenor

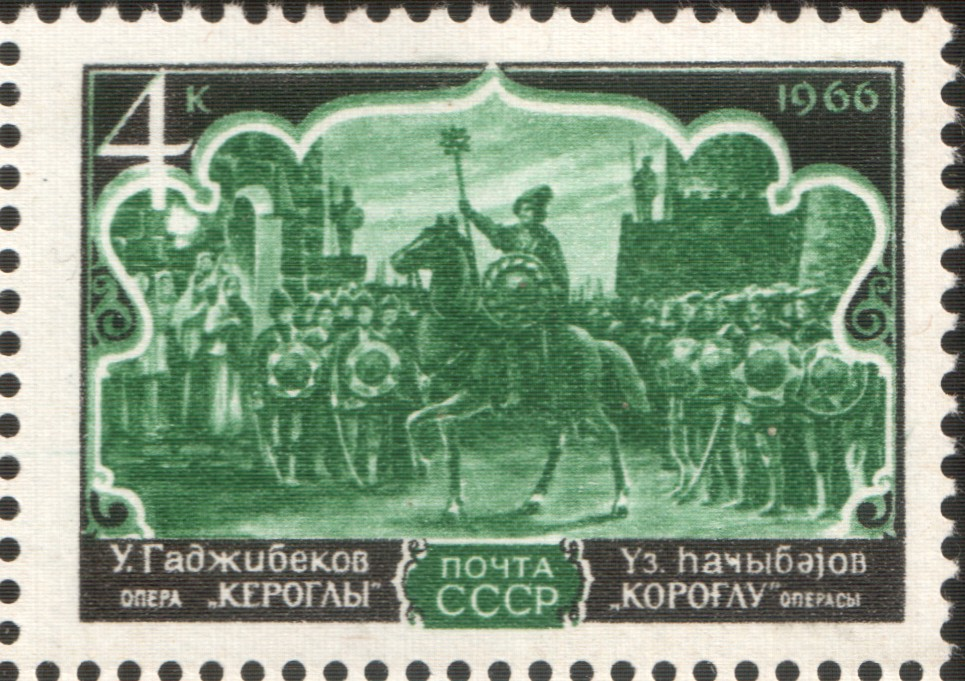
USSR postage stamp dedicated to the opera Koroghlu (1966)

== Synopsis ==
=== Act 1 ===
Azerbaijan, the end of 16th century. Walls of a majestic palace rise to skies in the middle of picturesque nature, at the foot of a mountain.

These are the possessions of Hassan khan the feudal lord. His subjects are destitute and live in poverty and hardship in dilapidated huts scattered among the palaces. Hassan khan is a cruel, heartless ruler. He does not hesitate to use violence, robbery and murder to consolidate his power.

Driven to despair by poverty, starvation, and the atrocities suffered at the hands of the khan, his subjects are restless. It seems there is enough fuel in their anger to start the fire of revolt. They need a spark to light the fire. But the khan feasts. Neighbor-feudal lords get together in his palace. Wishing to show his generosity, Hasan khan decides to present one of his guests with a horse. He orders his wrangler Ali bring the best horse from the herd. But unfortunately Ali has driven the herd off to the fields and it is impossible to carry out khan's order. Khan becomes furious and orders Ali to be blinded.

The poor man falls to his knees, and asks that as an act of mercy to be executed instead as he feels it is better for him to die than to lose the eyesight. The Khan is adamant and the servants take Ali away to blind him.

Ali's son ashik Rovshan returns home and unaware of the tragedy that has befallen his father, he is singing about his love to the beautiful Nigar, his beloved. Nigar hurries to inform him of the khan's crime. Rovshan rushes to help his father but he is too late! The crime has been committed. "Now, you are Koroghlu, the son of a blind man!" – Ali sorrowfully says to Rovshan.

Henceforth, the aim of Rovshan's life is revenge. Taking the name Koroghlu, he moves to the mountains and gathers all the people oppressed by the khan. They will revenge the tyrant's crimes. This is the spark the people were waiting for to light the fire of their revolt.

=== Act 2 ===
Hassan khan, facing the revolt is anxious whether the strong walls of his citadel will be able to protect him from the anger of his subjects. The uprising of the subjects has become a powerful force under the leadership of Koroghlu who has become a legend. Other feudal lords tremble in fear of Koroghlu the nation's avenger. Hassan Khan does not have sufficient forces to resist the uprising. He asks the Turkish Ehsan pasha for assistance. The two "wolves" collude quickly, but they can not trust each other. They celebrate their union with a feast of wine and dance, Hasan khan knows no rest and is still anxious.

During the celebrations a message is received that Hassan Khan's army has suffered a decisive defeat at the hands of Koroghlu's followers and it has been routed. There is a commotion among the guests. The feast turns to a council of war. Everybody offers its own plan for suppression of the rebels. Khan's jester Hamza's curious offer is the most acceptable: it is to steal Koroghlu's favorite black horse the Ghirr Aat. This will trick Koroghlu to come to free his loyal friend, allowing Khan's men to capture him, depriving the rebellion of its leader. But who will have the courage to steal the horse from the rebels' tower (Chenlibel)? Bald-headed Hamza is chosen to steal the horse. The risk is that Nigar, Koroghlu's beloved who is in Khan's captivity will know of the plot. But it is a risk to be taken. Hasan khan agrees.

Nigar is horrified by the coming trouble. She secretly sends her brother Eyvaz to Koroghlu.

=== Act 3 ===
More and more rebels get together under the banner of Koroghlu, who has been given the title "Commander of the Nation". He has returned to his fortress Chenlibel from a campaign with a new detachment of soldiers. Everyone are like brothers in Chenlibel and the newcomers are accepted as members of the family. The rebels take the friendship and loyalty oath to the battle standards of Koroghlu, the fighter for the nation's happiness.

Disguised Hamza the jester appears near the walls of the castle. He asks for refuge seeking shelter: pretends to be a groom who is running from the persecutions of Hassan khan. Koroglu trusts Hamza and charges him to look after his own horse Ghir Att. People warn Koroghlu, but it is in vain.

At night a storm hits the fortress. Darkness and a bad weather favors the crime: Hamza steals Ghir Att.

Koroghlu finds out too late – the enemy has disappeared in darkness. His favourite Ghir Att has also disappeared.

=== Act 4 ===
A cheerful feast in Hassan khan's palace.

An unknown ashik a travelling troubadour appears at the palace. Hassan khan orders him to sing. Strings of saz twang, a song about ardent love and a beautiful beloved pours from the strings. How good sings this ashik! In a new song the ashik sings of the glory of Koroghlu's horse Ghir Att. The khan laughs smugly and informs the audience that Ghir Att is in his stables. But the ashik doesn’t believe him saying that Ghir Att could not be here. Hassan Khan orders Ghir Att to be brought to the hall.

Hamza enters the hall. He recognizes "Koroghlu!" pretending to be the ashik. Koroghlu is arrested and tied up. The khan is delighted – a trap has been used successfully. Broken hearted, Nigar and her brother Eyvaz are brought in suspected of spying. Nigar confesses bravely: she has sent Eyvaz to inform Koroghlu. Hamza attacks Nigar but Koroglu breaks his bonds kills Hamza, jumps on Ghir Att in a flash and disappears.

All the power of Hassan khan's fury is directed at Nigar. He orders public execution of Nigar, her brother Eyvaz and the groom Polad, who had brought up Ghir Att from the stables.

=== Act 5 ===
The people are gathered at the square to watch the executions. The crowd is restless. Koroghlu's struggle for freedom has infused people with courage. People are protesting and loudly curse the khan. They receive the convicted persons with empathy; beautiful Nigar stands motionless on the scaffold with the support of her friends. She is the first to be executed. Hassan khan appears and orders the execution to begin. There is no fear in the courageous heart of Nigar. She angrily blames the khan. At that moment when the executioner' readies his axe Koroghlu's soldiers burst into the square and set the convicted free. It is the men who ordered the executions who receive the punishment. The people greet Koroghlu with delight.

== Recordings ==
- Uzeyir Hajibeyov: Koroghlu – Lutfiyar Imanov (Koroglu), Firangiz Ahmadova (Nigar); Orchestra and Choir of the Azerbaijan State Opera and Ballet Theater; Niyazi (conductor). Label: Azerbaijan International

== See also ==
- Music of Azerbaijan
