= Governor of Bolu =

Governor of a Turkish Province

Governor of Bolu Bolu Valiliği
- Logo of the Governor of Bolu
- Incumbent; Abdulaziz Aydın since September 26, 2024
- Appointer: President of Turkey On the recommendation of the Turkish government
- Term length: No set term length or limit
- Inaugural holder: Ahmet Fahrettin Bey; June 25, 1921
- Website: Office of the Governor

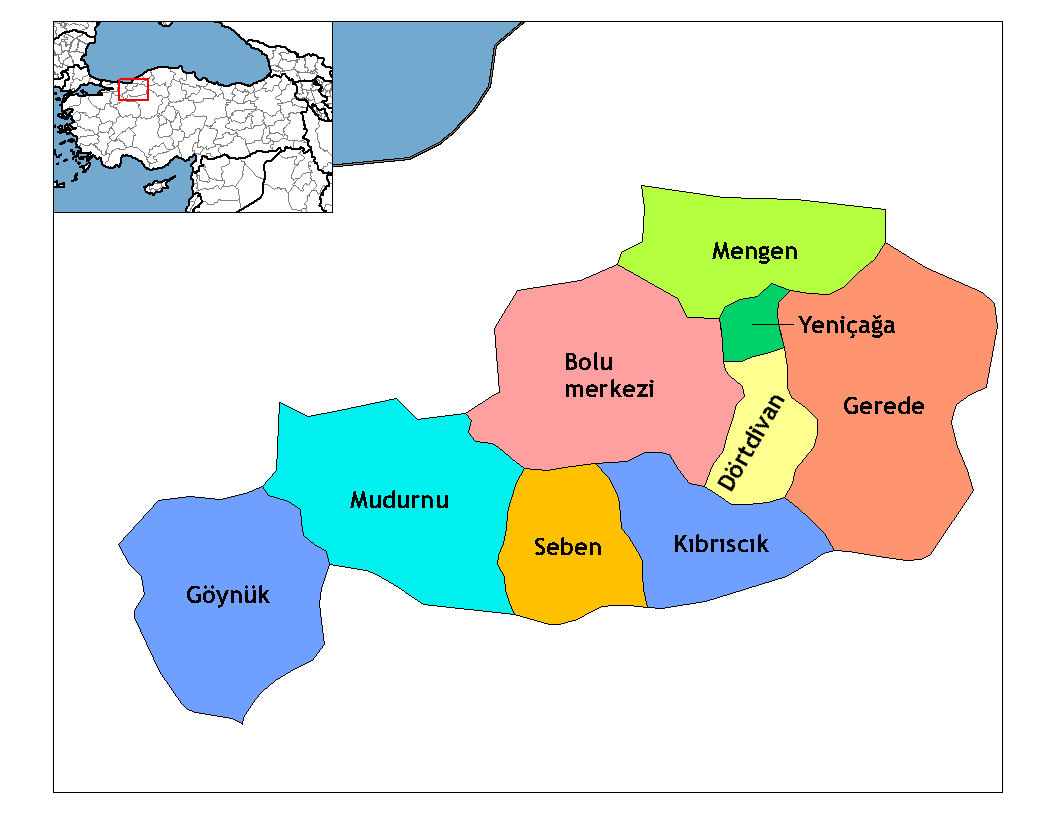
Map of the Province of Bolu, showing the provincial districts.

The Governor of Bolu (Turkish: Bolu Valiliği) is the bureaucratic state official responsible for both national government and state affairs in the Province of Bolu. Similar to the Governors of the 80 other Provinces of Turkey, the Governor of Bolu is appointed by the Government of Turkey and is responsible for the implementation of government legislation within Bolu. The Governor is also the most senior commander of both the Bolu provincial police force and the Bolu Gendarmerie.

== Appointment ==
The Governor of Bolu is appointed by the President of Turkey, who confirms the appointment after recommendation from the Turkish Government. The Ministry of the Interior first considers and puts forward possible candidates for approval by the cabinet. The Governor of Bolu is therefore not a directly elected position and instead functions as the most senior civil servant in the Province of Bolu.

=== Term limits ===
The Governor is not limited by any term limits and does not serve for a set length of time. Instead, the Governor serves at the pleasure of the Government, which can appoint or reposition the Governor whenever it sees fit. Such decisions are again made by the cabinet of Turkey. The Governor of Bolu, as a civil servant, may not have any close connections or prior experience in Bolu Province. It is not unusual for Governors to alternate between several different Provinces during their bureaucratic career.

== Functions ==
The Governor of Bolu has both bureaucratic functions and influence over local government. The main role of the Governor is to oversee the implementation of decisions by government ministries, constitutional requirements and legislation passed by Grand National Assembly within the provincial borders. The Governor also has the power to reassign, remove or appoint officials a certain number of public offices and has the right to alter the role of certain public institutions if they see fit. Governors are also the most senior public official within the Province, meaning that they preside over any public ceremonies or provincial celebrations being held due to a national holiday. As the commander of the provincial police and Gendarmerie forces, the Governor can also take decisions designed to limit civil disobedience and preserve public order. Although mayors of municipalities and councillors are elected during local elections, the Governor has the right to re-organise or to inspect the proceedings of local government despite being an unelected position.

== List of governors of Bolu ==
- Ahmet Fahrettin Bey (1924–1927)
- Salim Özdemir Günday (1927–1928)
- Ali Sakıp Beygo (1928–1931)
- Ali Rıza Üner (1931–1936)
- Salim Gündoğan (1936–1939)
- Mehmet Naci Kıcıman (1939–1940)
- Ahmet Durmuş Evrendilek (1940–1944)
- Hasan Sükuti Tükel (1944–1945)
- Ömer Naci Rollas (1945–1946)
- Kemal Hadımlı (1946–1949)
- Ali Nihat Danışman (1949–1950)
- İhsan Ecemiş (1950–1953)
- Şevket Özenalp (1953)
- Celalettin Ünseli (1953–1956)
- Ahmet Tekelioğlu (1956–1958)
- İsmail Hakkı Ülgen (1958–1960)
- Fahri Cıvgın (1960–1964)
- Nusret Budunç (1964–1965)
- Asım Rıza Büyüklü (1965–1967)
- Şükrü Kenanoğlu (1967–1971)
- Suat Ergünek (1971)
- Haydar Özkın (1971–1972)
- Ragıp Gerçeker (1972–1975)
- Celal Kayacan (1975–1978)
- Macit İskenderoğlu (1978–1979)
- Mithat Çetin (1979–1980)
- Adnan Darendeliler (1980–1984)
- Nur Doğan Topaloğlu (1984–1985)
- Gökhan Aydıner (1985–1991)
- Rasim Baş (1991–1992)
- Yener Rakıcıoğlu (1992–1996)
- Nusret Miroğlu (1996–2000)
- Mehmet Ali Türker (2000–2004)
- Ali Serindağ (2004–2008)
- Halil İbrahim Akpınar (2008–2010)
- İbrahim Özçimen (2010–2014)
- Ahmet Zahteroğulları (2014–2015)
- Aydın Baruş (2015–2018)
- Ahmet Ümit (2018–2022)
- Erkan Kılıç (2022–2024)
- Abdulaziz Aydın (2024–)

== See also ==
- Governor (Turkey)
- Bolu Province
- Ministry of the Interior (Turkey)
