= Epic of Koroghlu =

Heroic epic poem of the Turkic peoples

- by folk
- Country: Azerbaijan, Iran, Turkey, Turkmenistan, Uzbekistan
- Language: Oghuz Turkic
- Subject: The legend typically describes a hero who seeks to avenge a wrong.
- Genre: Epic poetry

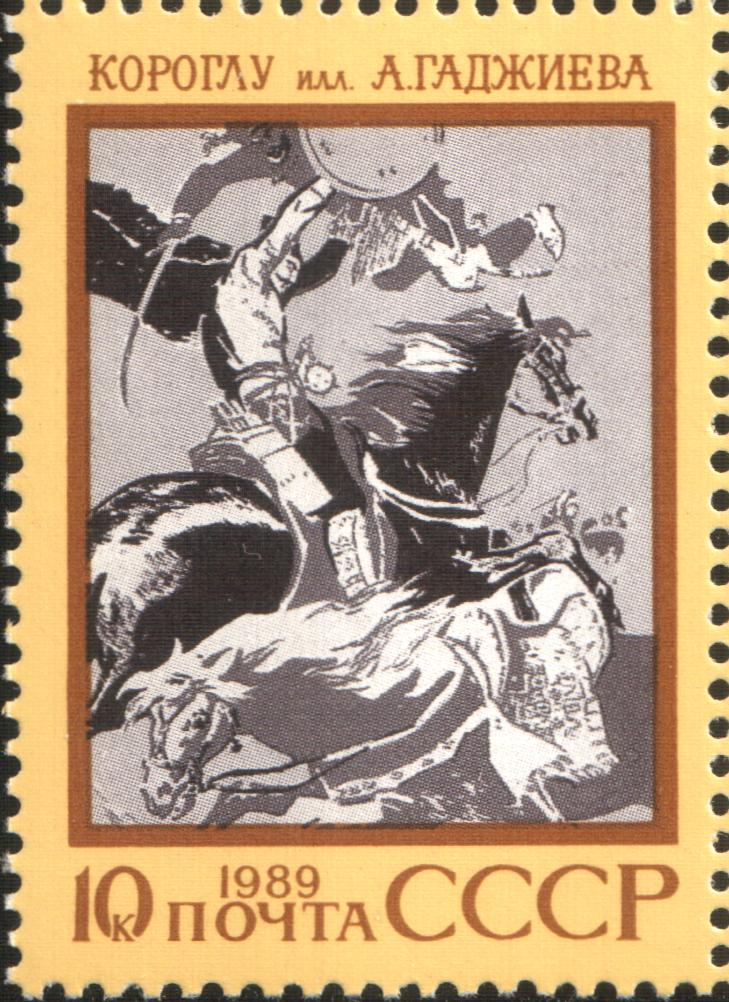
Stamp featuring Azerbaijan epic poem "Koroghlu", from the series Epic poems of USSR nations, 1989

The Epic of Koroghlu (Azerbaijani: Koroğlu dastanı, کراوغلو حماسه‌سی; Turkish: Köroğlu destanı; Turkmen: Görogly dessany; Uzbek: Goʻr oʻgʻli dostoni) is a heroic legend prominent in the oral traditions of the Turkic peoples, mainly the Oghuz Turks. The legend typically describes a hero who seeks to avenge a wrong. It was often put to music and played at sporting events as an inspiration to the competing athletes. Koroghlu is the main hero of an epic with the same name in Azerbaijani, Turkmen and Turkish as well as some other Turkic languages. The epic tells about the life and heroic deeds of Koroghlu as a hero of the people who struggled against unjust rulers. The epic combines the occasional romance with Robin Hood-like chivalry.

Due to the migration in the Middle Ages of large groups of Oghuz Turks within Central Asia, South Caucasus and Asia Minor, and their subsequent assimilation with other ethnic groups, the Epic of Koroghlu spread widely in these geographical regions leading to emergence of its Turkmen, Kazakh, Uzbek, Tajik, Azerbaijani, Turkish, Crimean Tatar, Georgian, Kurdish, and Armenian versions. The story has been told for many generations by the "bagshy" narrators of Turkmenistan, fighter Ashik bards of Azerbaijan and Turkey, and has been written down mostly in the 18th century.

== Koroghlu ==
Koroghlu is a semi-mystical hero and bard among the Turkic people who are thought to have lived in the 16th century. The name of "Koroghlu" means "the son of the blind", "the son of ember" or "the son of the clay" (the clay refers to death) in Turkic languages. His real name was Rövşən in Azerbaijani, Ruşen Ali in Turkish or Röwşen Aly in Turkmen, which was a loanword from Persian رَوشن Rawšan meaning light or bright.

== Turkmen tradition ==
In Turkmenistan, the epic is called Görogly which translates as "the son of a grave" and holds a special place among the Turkmen epics.

The Turkmen people refer to performers specialized in Görogly as dessanchy bagshy (musicians performing songs from dastan). Within Turkmenistan, dessanchy bagshy are encountered in two regions of the country: Daşoguz and Lebap. Outside of Turkmenistan, the tradition is found in neighbouring countries — including Uzbekistan, Tajikistan, Kazakhstan, and Iran — and in other places where Turkmen ethnic groups have historically lived.

The epic of Görogly tells the story of the hero, Görogly, and his forty jigits (warriors) that includes descriptions of all major traditional events of Turkmen life. Sections in prose that describe the events alternate with sections in poetry that express the characters’ feelings.

The first "chapter" of the epic is about a miraculous birth and heroic education of Görogly (he grows up with grandfather Jygalybek and aunt Gülendam), raising the winged horse called Gyrat, building the Chandybil fortress and gathering warriors. Next are the stories about the marriage of Görogly to a fairy-tale girl, peri Agaýunus (the hero falls in love with a girl in his dream, goes in search of her, overcomes obstacles, takes her to Chandybil), about revenge on Arab-Reýhan for kidnapping his aunt, Gülendam, about the adoption of Ovez, about saving him from captivity and about his marriage. The "chapters" about Görogly's battle with Arab-Reýhan, making a way into an enemy camp, the attack of the Sultan’s troops on the country of Görogly and the abduction of Ovez, the adoption of Gorogly Hassan, the son of a blacksmith, are of a heroic nature. The cycle ends with the story of the death of Görogly, who retired to a cave in old age.

Various art forms are employed in the oral performance of Görogly, including narration, singing, vocal improvisation, and acting. Dessanchy bagshys are known for their prodigious memory, outstanding musical skills, and intelligence, which are all necessary qualities for performing the epic. Performers should master traditional musical instruments — such as the dutar (a two-stringed plucked instrument) and the gyjak (an instrument resembling the fiddle)— and be able to sing various melodies of the epic, performing improvisation.

Under the supervision of his master, in addition to learning the repertoire and perfecting his skills, the apprentice of the baghshy learns moral and ethical norms of the epic performance. For the transmission of knowledge, teacher bagshys use a variety of techniques and materials. When the apprentice is ready, his knowledge is thoroughly evaluated. The master then gives his blessing to the new performer, who is thus granted the right to perform the epic independently and teach students of his own.

This system of transmission ensures a constant flow of knowledge from one generation to the next and maintains skill levels and standards. In addition, the Turkmen National Conservatory, the State School of Culture and Arts, and various specialized school facilitate the acquisition of dutar skills by learners before they enter training with a dessanchy bagshy master.

Görogly plays an important role in a wide range of social functions within Turkmen communities. Values and emotions described in the epic form a basis for social interactions among Turkmen people and are reflected in social networks and relations among individuals.

The epic enables Turkmen people to learn and transmit their common history and social values to younger generations. Indeed, it is used as a tool for educating the young and strengthening national identity, pride, and unity. Through Gorogly, youngsters are taught diligence and precise thinking skills. They are also taught to love the history and culture of their homeland. Yet respect towards other nations and cultures is encouraged.

In the epic, the Turkmen people are portrayed as compassionate, wise, generous, hospitable, and tolerant. They demonstrate leadership, fearlessness, and loyalty to friends, family, and country. They respect their elders and never break promises.

Because of the emphasis of these values in Gorogly, knowledge and skills related to the epic, including talent for music, poetry, narration, and language as well as traditional skills described in the epic—such as the breeding Akhal-Teke horses—are highly valued. All of these elements constitute the cultural identity of Turkmen people.

The element is safeguarded thanks to gatherings and social events such as wedding ceremonies. Dessanchy bagshy competitions, regular national and religious holidays, celebrations, commemorations, and international cultural festivals also contribute greatly to the safeguarding of the Görogly tradition. Bagshys are the main promoters of traditional Görogly performance as they teach and transmit the element to prospective performers in the same way they learned from their masters. In addition, each province has a bagshylar oyi ("house of bagshy"), where masters gather monthly to exchange ideas, record themselves, and broadcast their performances on TV and radio. This allows for the dissemination of the element among the public and attract potential new performers.

The following is one of several poems encountered in the Turkmen version of Görogly, which is often performed by bagshys at Turkmen weddings. First column is the poem in its original (Turkmen) language, the second column is the poem's Turkish translation and the third one is its English translation.

Kybladan sallanyp geldi mestana,
Aga jan, Arabyň gyzyn bereýin.
Jemalyn görenler boldy diwana,
Agajan, Arabyň gyzyn bereýin.

Aryp bolsaň, habar algyl sözünden,
Bakdygynça, gözüň doýmaz gözünden,
Aşyk bolan behre alar ýüzünden,
Aga jan, Arabyň gyzyn bereýin.

Ýene döwran geldi biziň bu baga,
Ol Zuleýha bolsa, sen Ýusup, aga,
Biziň gözel ähli şoňa sadaga,
Aga jan, Arabyň gyzyn bereýin.

Görogly beg ar üstünde söweşer,
Burma saçy tar-tar topugna düşer,
Ýuka dodaklary balmydyr-şeker,
Aga jan, Arabyň gyzyn bereýin.

Kıble'den sallanıp geldi mestane,
Ağacan, Arabın kızını vereyim.
Cemalını görenler olmuş divane,
Ağacan, Arabın kızını vereyim.

Arif olsan haber algıl sözünden,
Bakarsan gözlerin doymaz gözlerinden.
Aşık olan behre alır yüzünden,
Ağacan, Arabın kızını vereyim.

Yine devran geldi, bizim bu bağa,
O Züleyha ise sen Yusuf, ağa.
Tüm güzeller olsun ona sadaka,
Ağacan, Arabın kızını vereyim.

Köroğlu beğ öç uğruna savaşır,
Kıvırcık saçları topuğuna düşer,
İnce dudakları baldır ve şeker,
Ağacan, Arabın kızını vereyim.

She came swinging and whirling from the Qibla,
Brother, let me give you the Arab's daughter.
Those who gazed at her face lost their mind,
Brother, let me give you the Arab's daughter.

If you are wise enough, learn from her words,
The more you see her, the more you fall in love.
And her lover will find solace in her face,
Brother, let me give you the Arab's daughter.

Our time has come again, to this vineyard of ours,
And if she is Zuleykha, you are Yusuf, brother.
May all the beauties be alms to her,
Brother, let me give you the Arab's daughter.

Gorogly likes to fight for revenge,
Her curly hair reaches her tender ankles,
Her thin lips are made of honey, sugar,
Brother, let me give you the Arab's daughter.

== Azerbaijani and Turkish tradition ==
A theme common to nearly all versions is that of the hero — Turkish: Köroğlu, literally "son of the blind man", or more directly translated as 'Blindson' (analogous with the English surname Richardson, sons of Richard), defending his clan or tribe against threats from outside. In many of the versions, Turkish: Köroğlu earns his name from the wrongful blinding of his father, an act for which the son takes his revenge and which initiates his series of adventures. He is portrayed as a bandit and an ozan. A number of songs and melodies attributed to Turkish: Köroğlu survives in the folk tradition.

The most common version of the tale describes Turkish: Köroğlu destanı as Rushen Ali, the son of the stableman Koca Yusuf lives in Dörtdivan under the service of the Bey of Bolu. One day, Yusuf comes across a filly which, to his trained eye, is an animal that will turn into a fine beast if well-fed. Bey wants to give good fillies to the Sultan as a present to repair their worsening relationship. However, the Bey does not know enough about horses to appreciate the thin, famished animal that is presented to him. Being a man of foul and easily provoked temper, he suspects that he is being mocked and orders the poor worker to be blinded. His son, therefore, gains his nickname and harbors an ever-increasing hatred towards the Bey of Bolu in his heart as he grows up. The mare, which he names Kırat (kır at means literally "gray horse"; the word kırat can also mean "carat", "quality"), grows up with him and indeed turns into an animal of legendary stature and strength.

One day, Hızır shows himself to Yusuf in a dream and tells him that soon, the waters of the river Aras will flow briefly as a kind of thick foam and whoever drinks that foam will be cured of whatever physical problems that may be ailing him, including blindness and aging. Yusuf goes to the shore of the river with his son, but his son drinks the foam before he does. As this miracle can give everlasting health and youth to only one man, Yusuf loses his chance to see again, and dies a few days later, ordering his son to avenge him.

In some versions of the story, neither Yusuf nor his son can drink from the foam. Yusuf is warned by Hızır just before the phenomenon occurs, but being an old and blind man, he cannot reach the river in time. Köroğlu is by the river when the foam starts flowing, but, as he is ignorant of the significance of the event, he does not drink from the river. Instead, his horse Kırat does and becomes immortal.

After his father's death, Köroğlu takes up arms against the Bey. As he has only a few followers, he does not engage the army of Bolu directly and uses guerrilla tactics instead. He raids and plunders his former master's property, and eludes his would-be captors by staying on the move and fleeing to distant lands whenever his enemy organises a large-scale campaign to capture him.

Before he succeeds, however, the knowledge of firearms is carried by merchants to Anatolia. Even the simple guns of the time are sufficient to change the ways of the warriors forever: The balance of power is upset by the "holed iron", as Köroğlu calls the tool when he first sees one, and the Beys of Northern Anatolia engage in brutal warfare with each other. The fighting goes on and on, with no end in sight. Köroğlu realizes that even if he succeeds in bringing down the Bey of Bolu, he won't be able to bring back the old, chivalric world that he was born into. The warrior-poet disbands his followers and fades into obscurity, leaving only these lines behind:

Düşman geldi tabur tabur dizildi,
Alnımıza kara yazı yazıldı.
Tüfek icad oldu mertlik bozuldu
Gayri eğri kılıç kında paslanmalıdır.

Translation:

Battalion by battalion, the enemy has come and lined up,
The letters of dark destiny are written on our foreheads.
Valor has been lost whence guns were invented
The curved blade in its holster shall rust.

A typical occasion where one might hear Köroğlu melodies is at a traditional wrestling competition such as Kirkpinar. A team of zurna and davul players play continually as the wrestlers struggle with each other.

In 1967, Yaşar Kemal successfully collected this legend in his epic novel Üç Anadolu Efsanesi, which stands as the most outstanding Köroğlu reference in contemporary literature.

== Gurughli ==
Gurughli (also known as Gurghuli) is the titular character of the epic cycle from Central Asia. The cycle includes up to fifty segments which are still performed by the peoples of Turkestan in Tajik as well as Turkic languages.

Gurughli, whose name means "born of the grave", is the immaculately conceived child of the sister of Ahmadkhan (a Turkistan khan). She dies during pregnancy, and the child is born while the mother is already buried and survives on the milk of one of the mares from Ahmadkhan's herd, until he is found and named by shepherds. The other hero in the tales is his adopted son Ahwazkhan, child of a fairy mother.

His tales are told in all-night storytelling sessions in free verse. The background presumed known by the audience, they start without much introduction and are accompanied by music from a two-stringed lute, the dombra. Later brought into line with Islam, the stories originate from a time before Islam reached the area but became a "vehicle for the transmission of religious and moral instruction, especially targeted at the masses of nonliterate Muslims".

The extant corpus of Gurughli poetry entails some 100,000 lines. It reached its final form in the 18th century and was first discovered by the outside world through Russian travelers in 1870. It was recorded between 1930 and 1960 and is preserved in the Tajik Academy of Sciences.

=== Uzbek tradition ===
In the Uzbek bakhshi tradition ("bakhshi" is a narrator of dastans or epic, usually, playing his dumbira, two-string musical instrument), the history and interpretation of Köroğlu's name are different from the Turkish one. "Go‘ro‘g‘li" in Uzbek just like in Turkmen means "the son of grave". As it is told, Gorogli's mother dies while being in the last months of pregnancy. However, people bury her with Gorogli inside. After some time, a local shepherd notices the number of sheep is decreasing. He spies after his sheep and finds a small boy, at the age of 3-4 eating one of the sheep. When he tries to catch the boy, he escapes and hides in a grave. As the story narrates later he will fight against giants and kill them. It is said Gorogli had a horse called "G`irot". The capital of Gorogli's state was in legendary Chambil.

== International recognition ==
In December 2015, the Turkmen epic art of Görogly was inscribed on UNESCO's Representative List of the Intangible Cultural Heritage of Humanity.

== Toponyms ==
Görogly is commonly used in naming streets and districts in Turkmenistan, including Görogly köçesi in Ashgabat. It is also the name of a town near Dashoguz.

== In art ==
- Azerbaijani composer Uzeyir Hajibeyov has created an opera by this name, using the Ashik stories and masterfully combined some Ashik music with this major classical work. See The Opera of Koroglu.

== Koroghlu in popular culture ==
- Köroğlu film by Atıf Yılmaz, starring Cüneyt Arkın, 1968: IMDB tt0183368
- Üç Anadolu Efsanesi (Three Anatolian Legends) novel of Yaşar Kemal
- Koroğlu film by Huseyn Seyidzade, starring Afrasiyab Mammadov, 1960
- Koroğlu film by Rovshen Almuradli, 2003
- Koroğlu opera by Uzeyir Hajibeyov, 1937

== See also ==
- Book of Dede Korkut
- Epic tradition of Turkish literature
- Turkish folk music
- Turkish folklore
- Turkmen music
- Turkmen literature
- Azerbaijani literature
- Opera of Koroglu
