= Lutfiyar Imanov =

Lutfiyar Imanov Lütfiyar İmanov
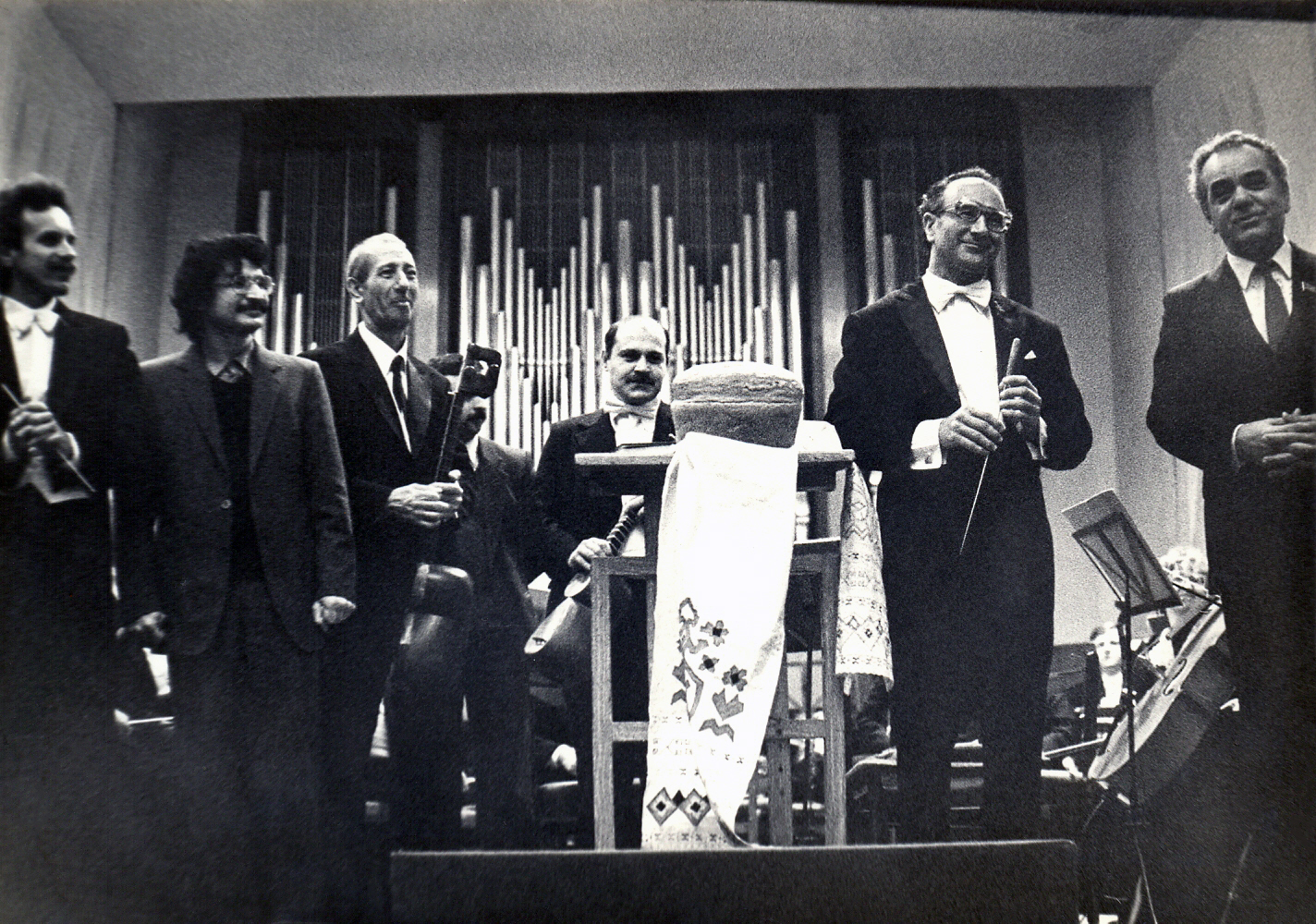
- Imanov (far right) in 1985

Background information
- Born: April 17, 1928; Petropavlovka, Transcaucasian SFSR, Soviet Union (present-day Sabirabad, Azerbaijan)
- Died: January 21, 2008 (aged 79) Baku, Azerbaijan
- Genres: Classical
- Occupation: Opera singer
- Instrument: Singing

Lutfiyar Muslum oglu Imanov (Note: Azerbaijani: Lütfiyar Müslüm oğlu İmanov; Russian: Лютфияр Муслим оглы Иманов, romanized: Lyutfiyar Muslim ogly Imanov) (17 April 1928 – 21 January 2008), was a Soviet and Azerbaijani opera singer (dramatic tenor).

== Career ==
Lutfiyar Imanov was born in Sabirabad and started his career in the arts as a teenage actor at the Sabirabad State Drama Theatre. He graduated from the Asaf Zeynally Music College with a degree in vocal arts in 1957. At the time, he had been working with various Azerbaijani choirs and orchestras. He made his operatic debut in 1957 when he performed in the leading role in Uzeyir Hajibeyov's opera Koroghlu in Moscow.

Upon graduating, he accepted a job at the Azerbaijan State Academic Theatre of Musical Comedy before switching in 1959 to the Azerbaijan State Academic Opera and Ballet Theater where he worked until his death. In 1962, he was admitted to the six-year program in drama studies at the Azerbaijan State University of Culture and Arts. In 1965 and 1975, respectively, Imanov was an intern at the Bolshoi Theatre in Moscow and La Scala in Milan. From 1968 onward, he performed leading roles in over 30 operas.

Besides performing, he taught vocal arts, mostly at the Azerbaijan State Conservatoire, but also in music schools in Istanbul and İzmir, Turkey (1991–95). In the 1990s, he toured Iran, Italy, the United Kingdom and Germany. His performance was recognized by his being awarded the prestigious title of the People's Artist of the USSR in 1977. He was also awarded with People's Artiste of the Azerbaijan SSR, Honored Artist of the Azerbaijan SSR, Order of the Red Banner of Labour, and Istiglal Order. Imanov died in Baku on 21 January 2008.
