= Kartalkaya =

Ski resort in north-central Turkey

- Location within Turkey
- Location: Seben, Bolu Province, Turkey
- Nearest city: Bolu
- Coordinates: 40°40′10″N 31°47′10″E
- Vertical: 405 m (1,329 ft)
- Top elevation: 2,255 m (7,398 ft)
- Base elevation: 1,850 m (6,070 ft)
- Trails: 14
- Lift system: 3 chairlifts 7 surface lifts
- Terrain parks: 1
- Website: Kartalkaya

Kartalkaya is a ski resort located in the Köroğlu Mountains, in Seben, Bolu Province, Turkey.

== History ==
Kartalkaya was developed as a ski resort in the 1970s. Prior to the there was no permanent settlement although the area was used for livestock grazing during the warmer part of the year.

Kartalkaya has suitable conditions for alpine skiing, ski touring and cross country skiing. The duration of the skiing season is 120 days a year, between December 20 and March 20. The nearest city is Bolu, 54 km (33 mi) away. Kartalkaya is located 2.5 hours away from Esenboğa International Airport, in Ankara, and 3.5 hours away from Istanbul Airport or Sabiha Gökçen International Airport, in Istanbul, by bus.

On 21 January 2025, a fire broke out at the Grand Kartal Hotel in Kartalkaya. At least 78 people were killed, while 51 others were injured.

== Culture ==
=== Tourism ===
Kartalkaya has four main hotels.

- Kartal Hotel
- DorukKaya Ski & Mountain Resort
- Kaya Palazzo Ski & Mountain Resort
- Golden Key Kartalkaya

A fifth hotel, the Grand Kartal Hotel, was destroyed by a fire in January 2025.

=== Landscapes ===
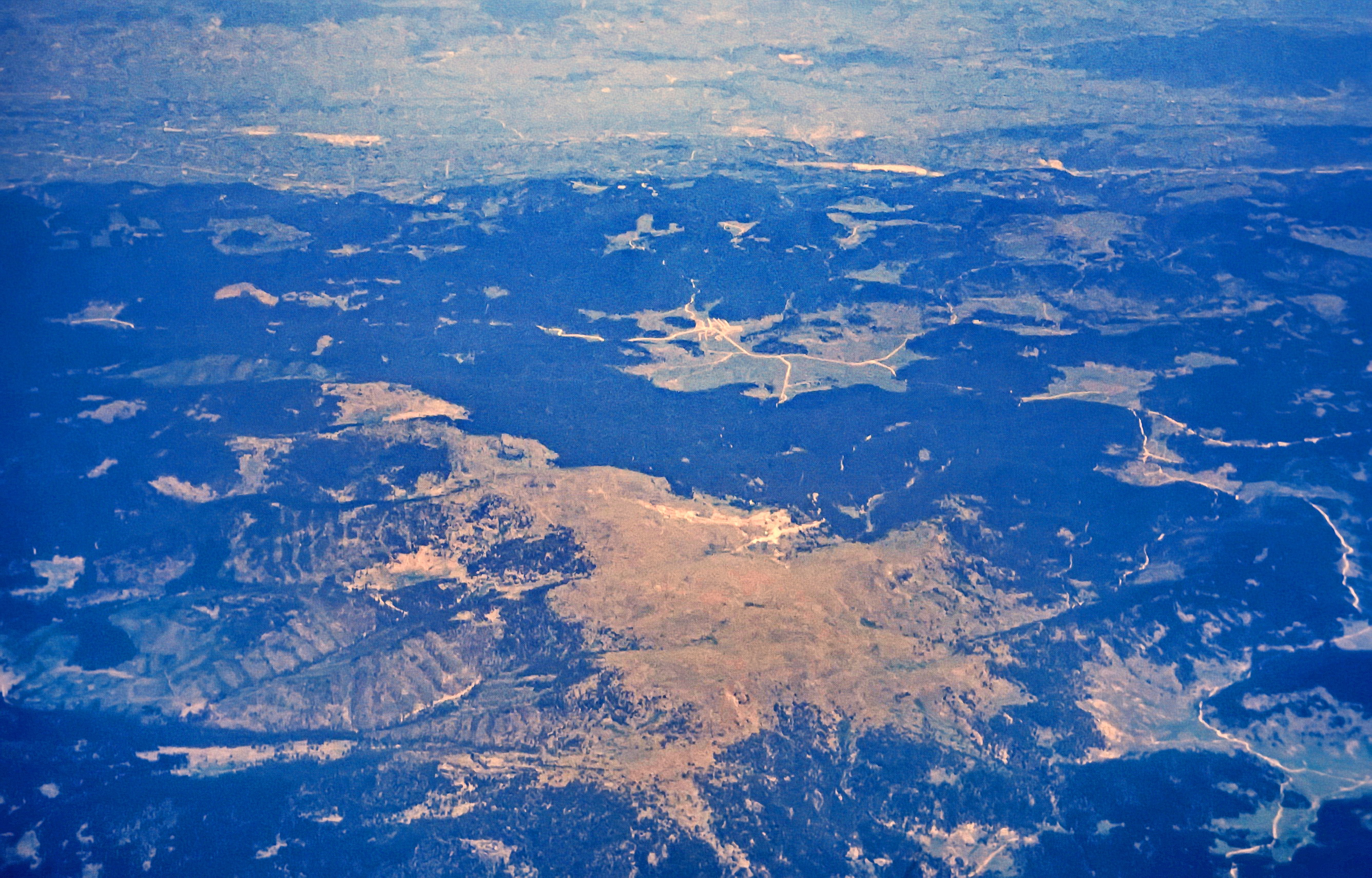
Aerial view

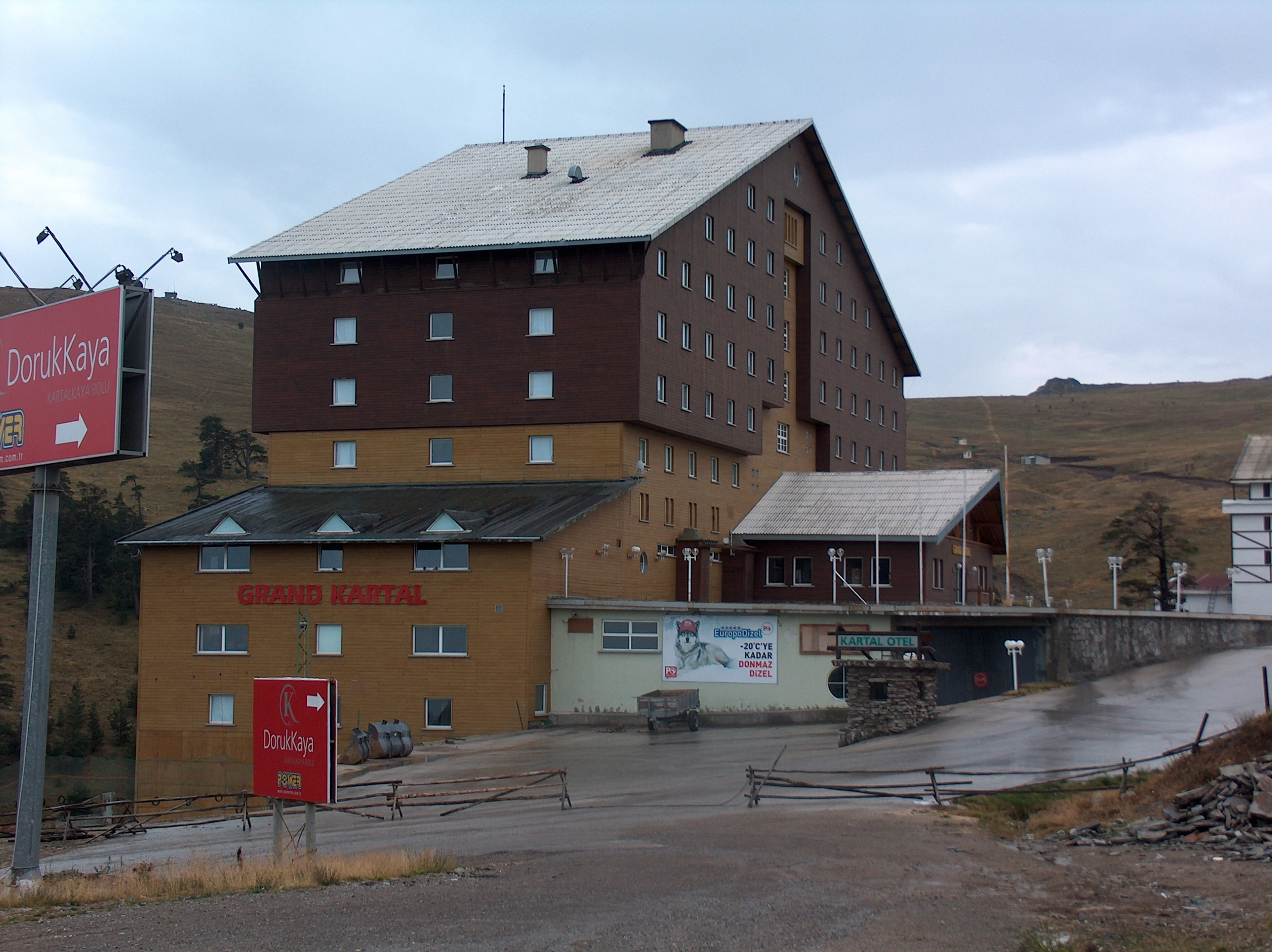
Grand Kartal Hotel 2007

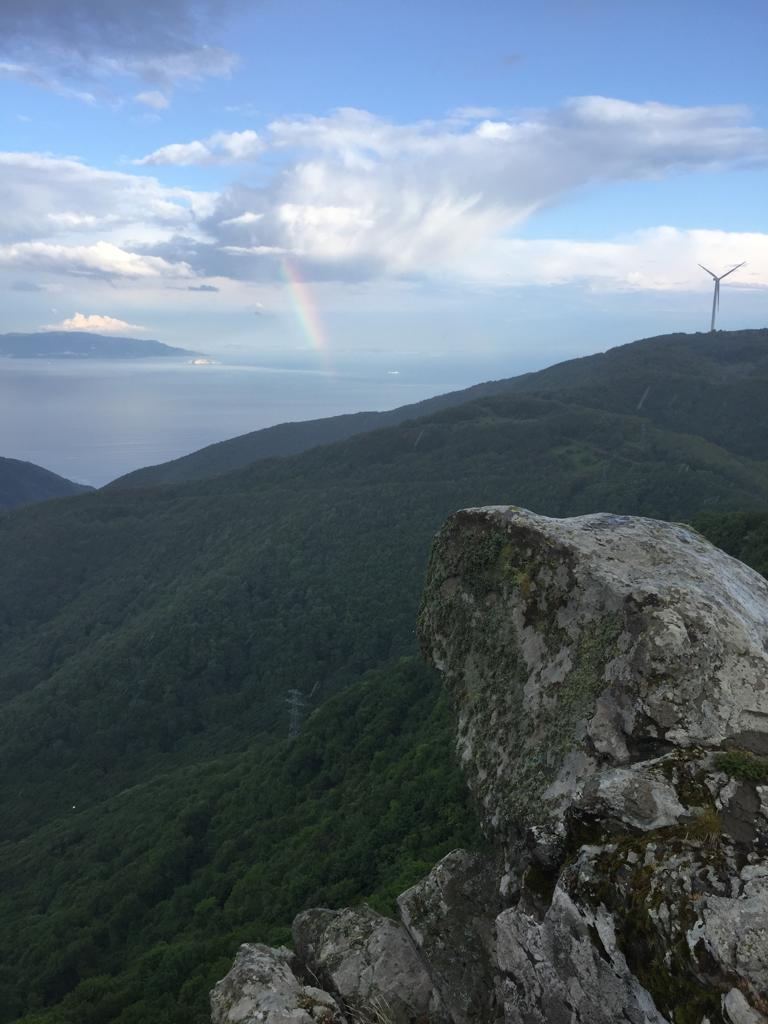
Kartalkaya wind power

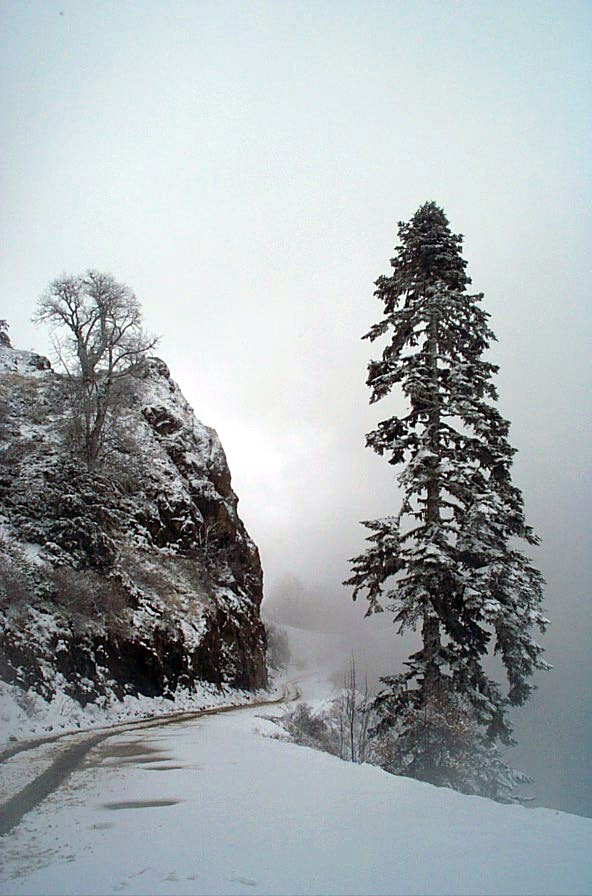
Kartalkaya in winter

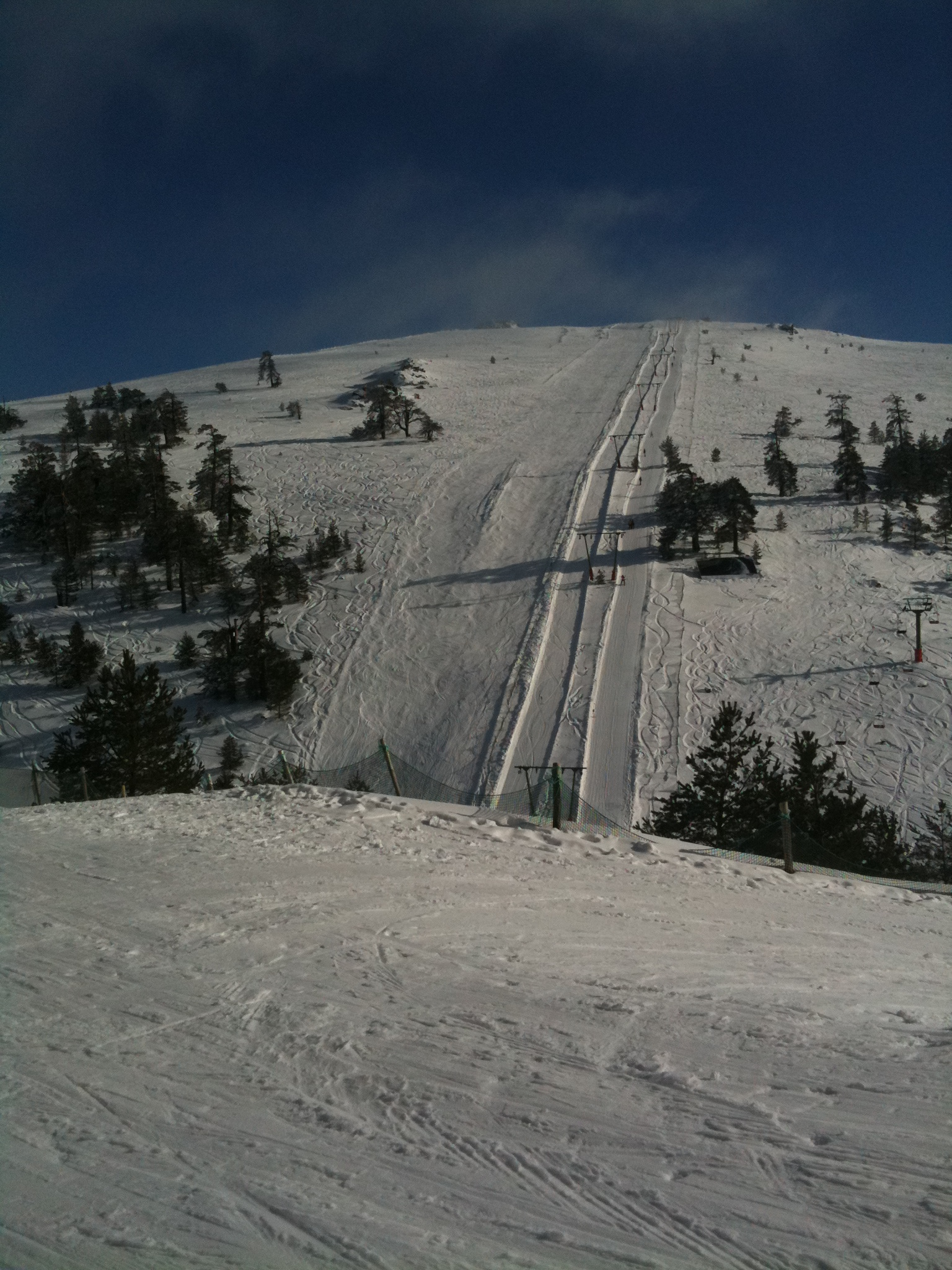
Kartalkaya ski slope

== See also ==
- Bolu District
- Dörtdivan District
- Gerede District
- Göynük District
- Kıbrıscık District
- Mengen District
- Mudurnu District
- Seben District
- Yeniçağa District
