= Bolu Province =

Province of Turkey

Bolu Province Bolu ili
- Province
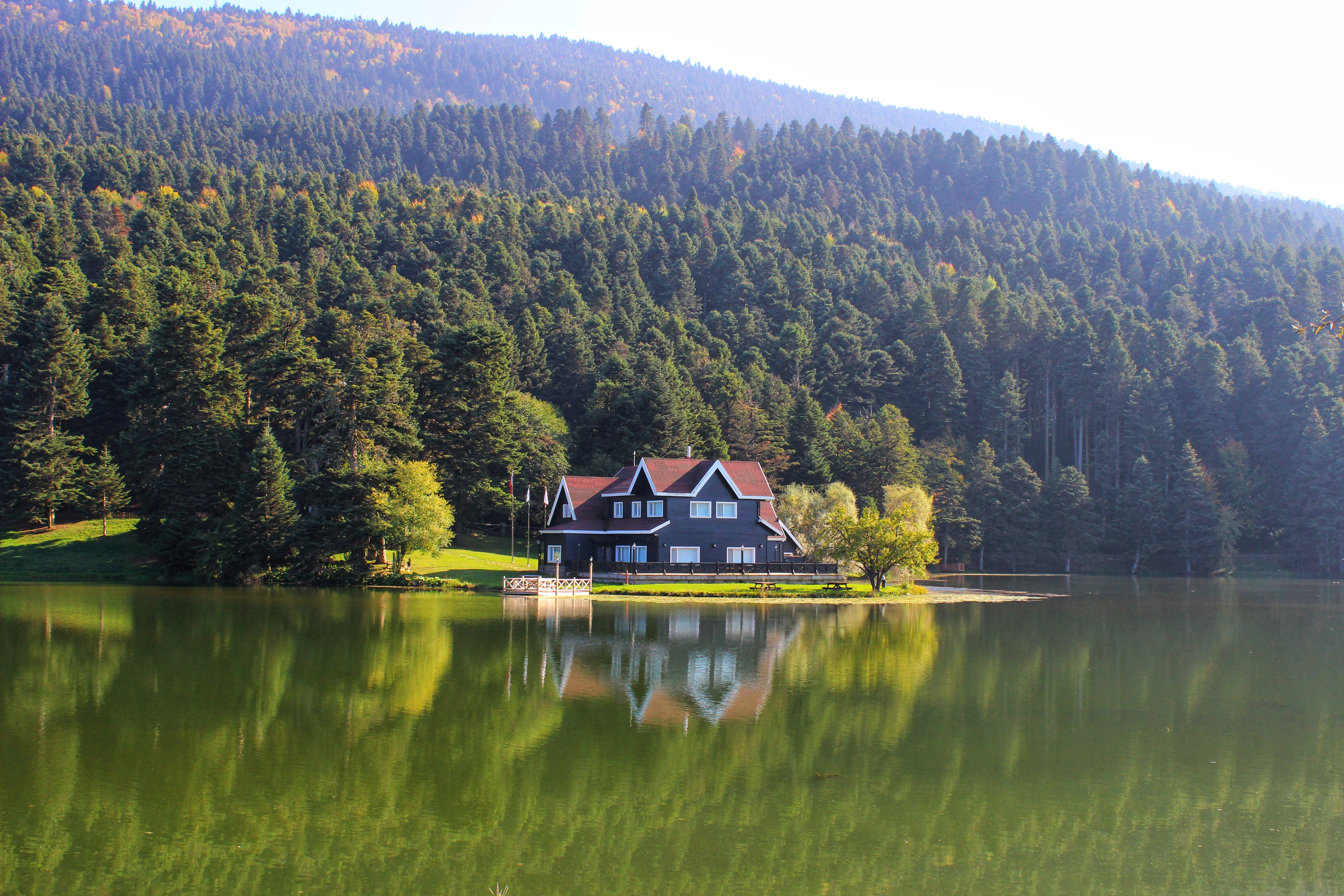
- Lake Gölcük

- Location of the province within Turkey
- Coordinates: 40°40′45″N 31°33′30″E
- Country: Turkey
- Seat: Bolu

Government
  - Governor: Abdulaziz Aydın
- Area: 8,313 km^{2} (3,210 sq mi)
- Population (2022): 320,824
  - Density: 38.59/km^{2} (99.96/sq mi)
- Time zone: UTC+3 (TRT)
- Area code: 0374
- ISO 3166 code: TR-14
- Website: www.bolu.gov.tr

Bolu Province (Turkish: Bolu ili) is a province in north-western Turkey, between the capital, Ankara, and the largest city in the country, Istanbul. Its area is 8,313 square kilometres (3,210 sq mi), and its population is 320,824 (2022). The capital city of the province is Bolu.

== Geography ==
The province is drained by the Bolu River (Boli Su) and the Koca River.

The forests, lakes, and mountains are home to wildlife, including three deer species. Parts of the province are vulnerable to earthquakes.

== Protected areas ==
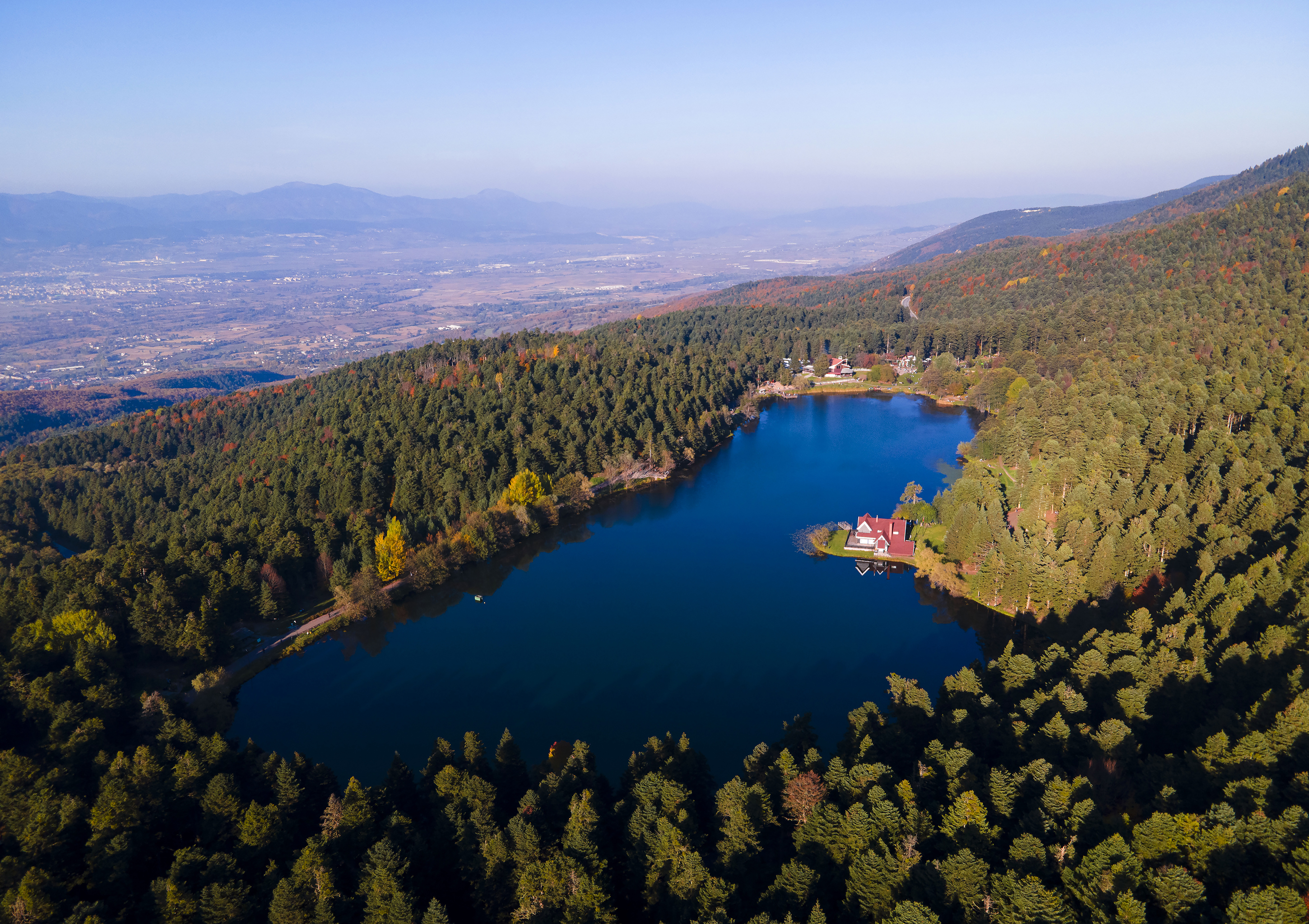
Bolu Gölcük Nature Park aerial view

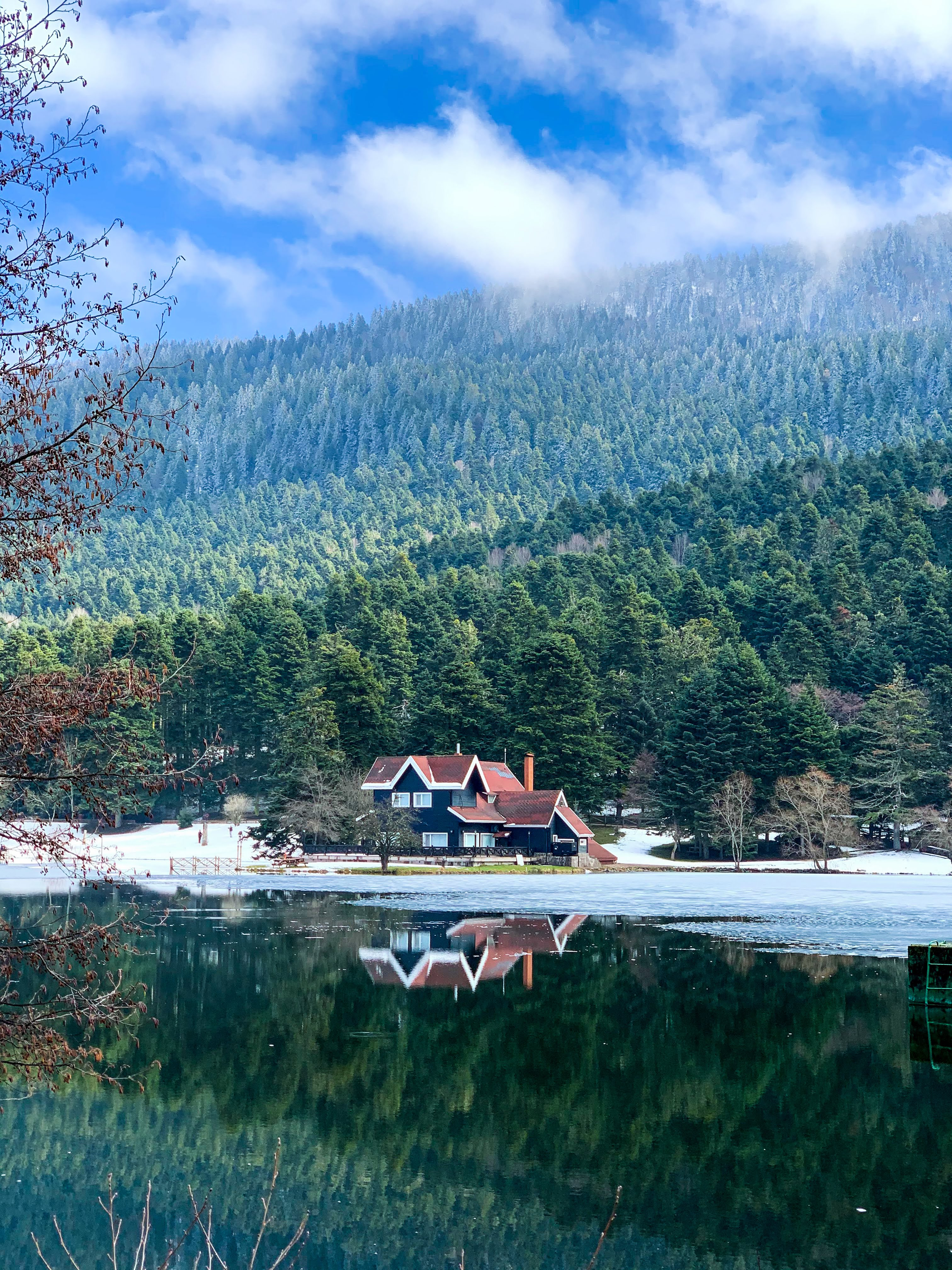
Bolu Gölcük Nature Park side view of the State Guesthouse

The province has the Yedigöller National Park.

There is also another area consisting of a lake and its surroundings that is under protection by the Ministry of Agriculture and Forestry as a 'nature park' that is called Gölcük. There is a structure on the shore of the lake named the State Guesthouse of the Ministry of Forestry. Near the nature park is an artificial lake; the lake is 13 kilometres (8 mi) to the south of the city of Bolu.

== History ==
It is not known when Bolu was first established. Some archaeological findings that date back about 100,000 years suggest the region was inhabited then.

The area now in Bolu Province was in eastern Bithynia and southwestern Paphlagonia. The town of Bithynium, from which the area takes its name, is the modern Bolu. The area was called Bithynia during the Hellenistic period. The Romans named it Claudiopolis, and it was called Bolu by the Turks. By approximately 375 BCE, Bithynia had gained its independence from Persia under Artaxerxes II, and King Bas subsequently defeated Alexander's attempt to take it. The Bithynian region, with parts of Paphlagonia remained its own kingdom until 88 BCE, when it briefly came under Mithridates VI and the Kingdom of Pontus. With Roman's help, the last Bithynian king, Nicomedes IV, regained his throne, but on his death bequeathed the kingdom to Rome. This led to the Third Mithridatic War and the fall of Pontus, after which the area was incorporated into the Roman Empire as a single province, merging Paphlagonia with Bithynia. Under the falling Byzantine Empire, the Bolu area was divided from western Bithynia at the Sakarya River, with western Bithynia keeping the name. The Sakarya River remains the southern and western boundary of the province.

After the victory of Malazgirt in 1071, the Turkmens spread to the west and settled in Bolu 3 years later. The Turkmens who settled in Bolu in 1074 easily integrated with the Bulgar, Pecheneg, Uz and Cuman Turks that the Byzantine Empire's had brought from the Balkans long before and later. Bolu and its villages were completely Turkified and took the names of the Turkic tribes. The Turks who came from the Balkans became Christians, but they did not forget the Turkic language, customs and traditions. They became Muslims in a short time.

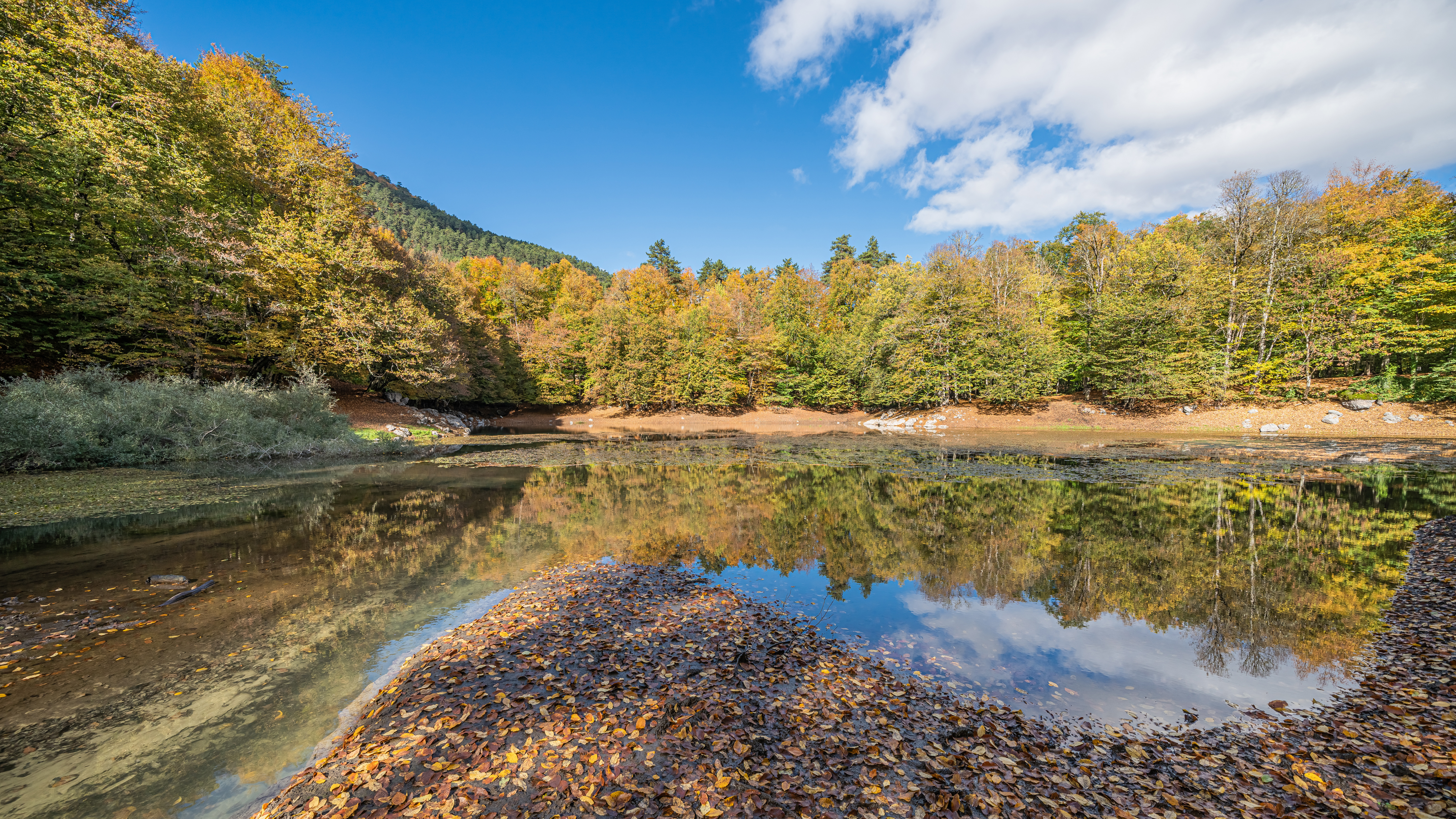
Yedigöller National Park

The Byzantine Empire briefly lost the Bolu area to the Seljuk Turks after the 1071 Battle of Manzikert but recovered it under Alexios I Komnenos. After the end of the Komnenos dynasty, the Turks gradually reclaimed the Bolu area back. In approximately 1240, the Seljuk Turks took the eastern part of the Bolu area (i.e., the Paphlagonian part) from the Byzantine Empire and incorporated it into the Sultanate of Rum. Due to their assistance in taking it and Sinop, the Chobanids were given that territory and adjacent areas to the north and east to govern. That eastern area fell to the Isfendiyarids in 1292 and was controlled by them until 1461, after which it was incorporated into the rest of the Ottoman Empire by Mehmed II.

By 1265, the western part of the Bolu area was again acquired by the Seljuk Turks, but it fell to Orhan and the Ottoman Empire in the early to mid-1300s. The two areas were reunited in 1461, under Mehmed II. In the 1864 Ottoman Empire administrative reorganization, Bolu was made into an independent sanjak, although it was geographically part of the Kastamonu Vilayet.

== Administrative divisions ==
Bolu province is divided into nine districts, four sub-districts, thirteen municipalities, and 491 villages.

=== Districts ===
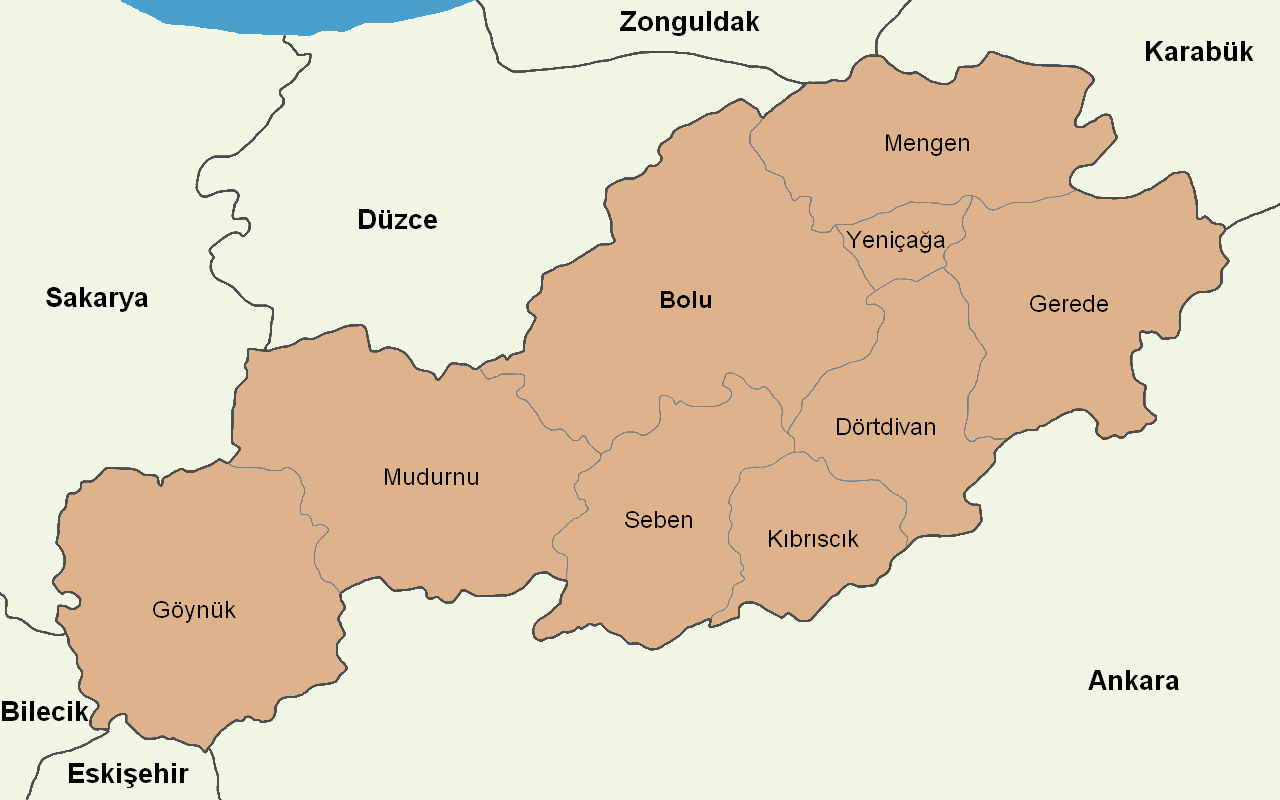
Districts of Bolu Province

- Bolu, the capital district
- Dörtdivan
- Gerede
- Göynük
- Kıbrıscık
- Mengen
- Mudurnu
- Seben
- Yeniçağa

== Main sites ==
- Lake Abant, a mountain lake resort and hot springs
- Yedigöller National Park. The name means "seven lakes" in Turkish, referring to the number of lakes in this forest park.
- The Köroğlu Mountains, said to be the scene of the folk Epic of Köroğlu
- Kartalkaya, ski resort
- Göynük Akshemseddin Mausoleum
- Sarıalan, a lake high in the mountains above Kartalkaya
- The Aladağ mountains, including the trail and picnic area of Gölcük

Towns include:

- Mengen
- Mudurnu (the ancient town of Modrenea)
- Gerede

== See also ==
- List of populated places in Bolu Province
