= Diyarbekir (Turkmenistan) =

Diyarbekir (Russian: Диярбекир; Turkmen: Diýärbekir) was a medieval settlement located in the Daşoguz region of modern-day Turkmenistan.

The ruins of a rectangular fortress — walled but interspersed with towers — are all that is left. To its southeast, ruins of, what was probably a caravenserai, can be spotted. To further south, lies the mausoleum of Ashyk Aydyn Pir; in local tradition, Pir spent a part of his life in the fortress.
