= Ashyk Aydyn Pir =

Ashyk Aydyn Pir is the patron saint of singers and bards, in Turkmen tradition.

== Mausoleum ==
Aydyn Pir's mausoleum (41.875454°N 58.635048°E) is located in the Daşoguz region of Turkmenistan, north of Diyarbekir. It is venerated by thousands of Turkmen, esp. those in pursuance of a career in music; they sleep on its steps, hoping to meet Pir in their dreams.
