= Dörtdivan District =

District of Bolu Province, Turkey

- District
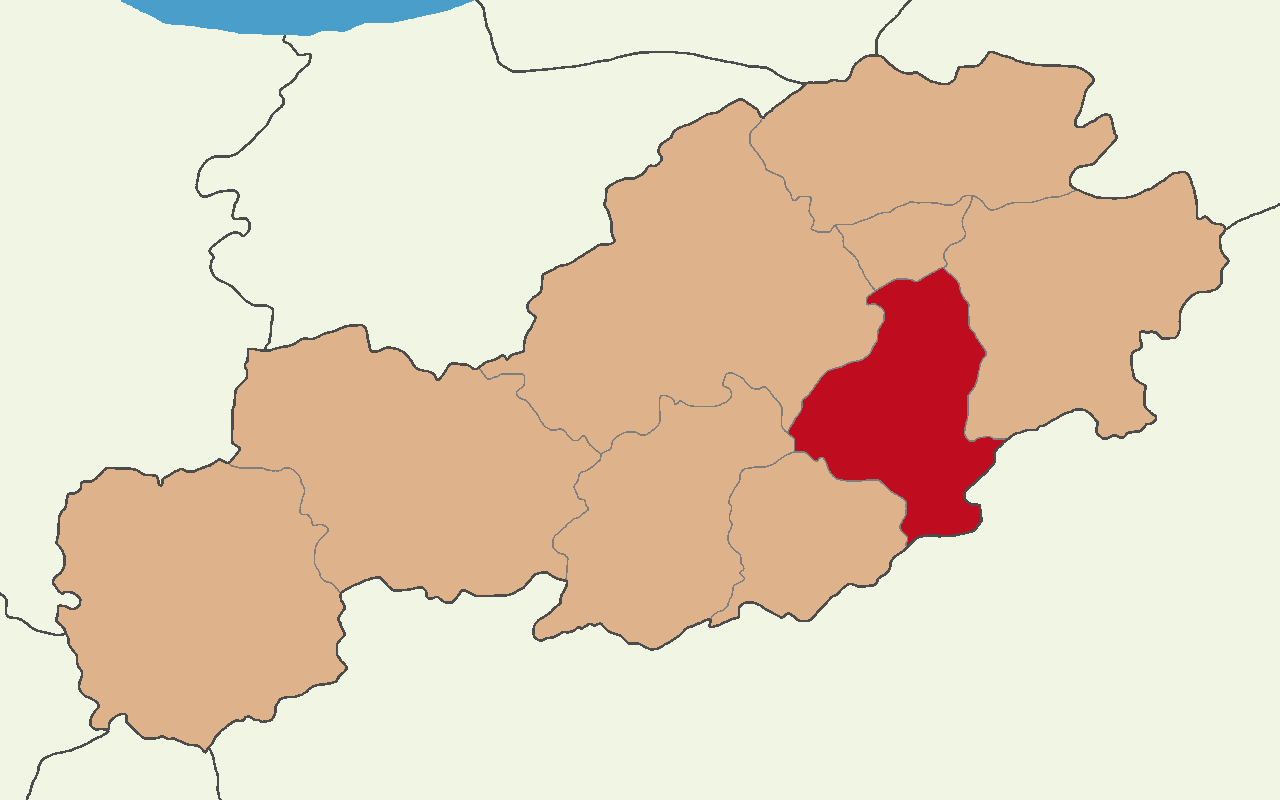
- Map showing Dörtdivan District in Bolu Province

- Location in Turkey
- Coordinates: 40°43′N 32°04′E
- Country: Turkey
- Province: Bolu
- Seat: Dörtdivan

Government
  - Kaymakam: Mustafa Batuhan Alpboğa
- Area: 634 km^{2} (245 sq mi)
- Population (2021): 6,540
  - Density: 10.3/km^{2} (26.7/sq mi)
- Time zone: UTC+3 (TRT)
- Website: www.dortdivan.gov.tr

Dörtdivan District is a district of the Bolu Province of Turkey. Its seat is the town of Dörtdivan. Its area is 634 km^{2}, and its population is 6,540 (2021).

== Composition ==
There is one municipality in Dörtdivan District:

- Dörtdivan

There are 24 villages in Dörtdivan District:

- Adaköy
- Aşağıdüğer
- Aşağısayık
- Bünüş
- Cemaller
- Çalköy
- Çardak
- Çetikören
- Doğancılar
- Dülger
- Göbüler
- Gücükler
- Kılıçlar
- Kuruca
- Ortaköy
- Ömerpaşalar
- Seyitaliler
- Sorkun
- Süleler
- Yağbaşlar
- Yalacık
- Yayalar
- Yukarıdüğer
- Yukarısayık
