= 2016 Adana student dormitory fire =

Dormitory fire in Adana, Turkey

- Date: 29 November 2016
- Time: 19:30 (GMT+3)
- Location: Adana, Turkey; 37.54817157°N 35.39388664°E
- Cause: Electrical fire, negligence
- Outcome: 12 dead, 24 injured, 4 arrested
- Deaths: 12
- Injuries: 24
- Inquiries: Kozan Chief Public Prosecutor
- Suspects: 7
- Charges: Gross negligence
- Verdict: Guilty
- Convictions: 4

The 2016 Adana student dormitory fire, or the Aladağ disaster, was a fire that took place in the Aladağ Assistance Association for Students of Education Age Secondary Education Girls' Dormitory (Turkish: Aladağ Tahsil Çağındaki Talebelere Yardım Derneği Orta Öğretim Kız Öğrenci Yurdu) in the Sinanpaşa neighborhood of Aladağ, Adana, Turkey.

== Incident ==
The dormitory (Turkey)

The incident took place around 19:30 in Adana's Aladağ district, in a mostly wooden student dormitory with 34 students. The incident killed 11 secondary school female students and 1 caregiver. It was reported that those who lost their lives in the fire disaster were taken to the Adana Forensic Medicine Institute for identification, and it was notified that DNA samples will be taken from the families to identify some of the bodies.

== Aftermath ==
The Deputy Prime Minister Veysi Kaynak, the Minister of National Education İsmet Yılmaz, the Minister of Family and Social Policies Fatma Betül Sayan Kaya and the Minister of Interior Süleyman Soylu set out to go to Adana upon the instructions of Prime Minister Binali Yıldırım. Immediately after the fire the Radio and Television Supreme Council (RTÜK) imposed a publication ban on the fire until the investigation was completed.

== Investigation ==
Within the scope of the investigation initiated, the Kozan Chief Public Prosecutor and 3 prosecutors went to the region to investigate the incident. In 2022, after a retrial, four organization officials including the dormitory manager were sentenced to between 4 and 15 years in prison.

During the investigation, dormitory officials blamed the fire department, stating "If there had been a fire truck with a basket, the children would have been saved".

== Documentary ==
A documentary titled "Bir Yürek Yangını" (lit. 'A Heart Fire') was announced to participate in the Adana Golden Boll Film Festival in 2022. The name of the documentary originates from a quote by Can Atalay, a lawyer who was involved in the trials relating to the fire.
