= Ermenek coal mine =

Coal mine in Ermenek, Turkey

Ermenek coal mine, owned by a company formerly called Has Sekerler now Özşeker, is a coal mine in the Turkish town of Ermenek.

On October 28, 2014, 18 miners were trapped underground. It was the second major accident at a Turkish mine in six months; the previous one was the Soma mine disaster in May 2014.

== Accident ==
It is believed 18 miners were trapped about 300 meters underground by flooding caused by a broken pipe. In addition to those trapped, 20 workers have either escaped the mine or were rescued from it. Rescue workers are currently working to pump water out from three sections of the mine. On October 30, Energy Minister Taner Yıldız stated that this operation was being hampered by mud and damage within the mine. An official from the mine, which is privately owned, said the chances of the trapped miners making it to safety were slim unless they had been able to reach a safety gallery. Two of the miners' bodies have been located. On November 9, Yıldız said that arrest warrants for eight people had been issued, including the owner of the mine.

== Reactions ==
- Tayyip Erdogan, the President of Turkey, cancelled planned Republic Day celebrations due to the accident, and also visited the mine on October 29.
