= Hatay (electoral district) =

Electoral district for the Grand National Assembly of Turkey

Coordinates: 37°50′N 34°45′E

- electoral district for the Grand National Assembly of Turkey
- Hatay shown within Turkey
- Province: Hatay
- Electorate: 934,254

Current electoral district
- Created: 1939
- Seats: 10
- MPs: List: Adem Yeşildal AK Party Hacı Bayram Türkoğlu AK Party Mehmet Öntürk AK Party Orhan Karasayar AK Party Sadullah Ergin AK Party Hasan Akgöl CHP Mehmet Ali Ediboğlu CHP Mevlüt Dudu CHP Refik Eryılmaz CHP Adnan Şefik Çirkin MHP
- Turnout at last election: 86.79%
- Representation
- AK Party: 5 / 10
- CHP: 4 / 10
- MHP: 1 / 10

Hatay is an electoral district of the Grand National Assembly of Turkey. It elects ten members of parliament (deputies) to represent the province of the same name for a four-year term by the D'Hondt method, a party-list proportional representation system.

== Members ==
Population reviews of each electoral district are conducted before each general election, which can lead to certain districts being granted a smaller or greater number of parliamentary seats.

Hatay became part of Turkey after a referendum in 1939. Since 1999, the province elects ten MPs to Parliament.

MPs for Hatay, 1999 onwards
| Election | 1999 (21st Parliament) | 2002 (22nd Parliament) | 2007 (23rd Parliament) | 2011 (24th Parliament) | June 2015 (25th Parliament) |
| MP | Hakkı Oğuz Aykut; ANAP | Mehmet Eraslan; AK Party | Abdülhadi Kahya; AK Party | Adem Yeşildal; AK Party | |
| MP | Levent Mıstıkoğlu; ANAP | Sadullah Ergin; AK Party | | | Mehmet Alğan; AK Party |
| MP | Namık Kemal Atahan; DSP | Fuat Geçen; AK Party | Orhan Karasayar; AK Party | Mehmet Öntürk; AK Party | |
| MP | Ali Günay; DSP | Mehmet Soydan; AK Party | Mustafa Öztürk; AK Party | Orhan Karasayar; AK Party | |
| MP | Mehmet Dönen; DYP | İsmail Soylu; AK Party | Fevzi Şanverdi; AK Party | Hacı Bayram Türkoğlu; AK Party | |
| MP | Mustafa Geçer; Virtue | Fuat Çay; CHP | | Hasan Akgöl; CHP | Hilmi Yarayıcı; CHP |
| MP | Süleyman Metin Kalkan; Virtue | Gökhan Durgun; CHP | | Mehmet Ali Ediboğlu; CHP | Birol Ertem; CHP |
| MP | Süleyman Turan Çirkin; MHP | Abdulaziz Yazar; CHP | | Mevlüt Dudu; CHP | |
| MP | Mehmet Nuri Tarhan; MHP | Inal Batu; CHP | Süleyman Turan Çirkin; MHP | Refik Eryılmaz; CHP | Serkan Topal; CHP |
| MP | Mehmet Şandır; MHP | Züheyir Amber; CHP | İzzettin Yılmaz; MHP | Adnan Şefik Çirkin; MHP | |

== General elections ==
=== 2011 ===
2011 general election: Hatay
| Party | Candidate | Votes | % | ±% |
|---|---|---|---|---|
| AK Party | 5 elected 0: 1. Sadullah Ergin ✓; 2. Orhan Karasayar ✓; 3. Mehmet Öntürk ✓; 4. Adem Yeşildal ✓; 5. Hacı Bayram Türkoğlu ✓; 6. Filiz Özçörekçi ✗; 7. Fevzi Şanverdi ✗; 8. Mehmet Saruhan ✗; 9. Abdülkerim Güven ✗; 10. Hür Emre Önal ✗ | 353,616 | 44.44 | ▲3.60 |
| CHP | 4 elected ▲1: 1. Mehmet Ali Ediboğlu ✓; 2. Mevlüt Dudu ✓; 3. Refik Eryılmaz ✓; 4. Hasan Akgöl ✓; 5. Nihad Matkap ✗; 6. Suzan Alhasoğlu ✗; 7. Uğur Bilkay ✗; 8. Ali Oğuz ✗; 9. Ali Aslan ✗; 10. Yılmaz Şahutoğlu ✗ | 306,498 | 38.52 | ▲7.37 |
| MHP | 1 elected ▼1: 1. Adnan Şefik Çirkin ✓; 2. Bilal Karaca ✗; 3. İsmail Hakkı Yücel ✗; 4. Selahaddin Gençer ✗; 5. Bülent Bahadırlı ✗; 6. Hüseyin Akgöl ✗; 7. Canan Gencer ✗; 8. Yaşar Gürakan ✗; 9. İrfan Oktay ✗; 10. Ömer Girgeç ✗ | 100,499 | 12.63 | ▼4.16 |
| Independent | None elected: Melih Sürmeli ✗ Mevlüt Uslu ✗ Nihat Taşkın ✗ Ali Başkar ✗ Hayrettin Arslan ✗ Mahmut Aksoy ✗ Mahmut Yardımcı ✗ | 11,808 | 1.48 | ▼0.69 |
| SAADET | None elected: 1. Necmettin Çalışkan ✗; 2. Mehmet Ayaz ✗; 3. Halil Geçer ✗; 4. Atila Erol ✗; 5. Ramazan Öksüz ✗; 6. Ahmet Nebih Yöney ✗; 7. Nihat Yazıcı ✗; 8. Necati Börklü ✗; 9. Selami Çekiç ✗; 10. Fahri Serdar Özal ✗ | 5,941 | 0.75 | ▼0.39 |
| DP | None elected: 1. Saadet Özmen ✗; 2. Fehmi Uçar ✗; 3. Ömer Aytekin ✗; 4. Recep Tekin ✗; 5. Ali Usta ✗; 6. Zerrin Yalçın ✗; 7. Şaban Erol Atılğanlar ✗; 8. İhsan Süs ✗; 9. Orhan Polat ✗; 10. Mehmet Küçük ✗ | 4,341 | 0.55 | ▼3.58 |
| Büyük Birlik | None elected: 1. Halil Akkaya ✗; 2. Ahmet Gündüzalp ✗; 3. Hüseyin Yunus ✗; 4. Metin Yeşilkaya ✗; 5. Nazmi Kalkar ✗; 6. Mevlüt Atabek ✗; 7. Halil Yazgeç ✗; 8. Yusuf Ziya Şanverdi ✗; 9. Fatih Özer ✗; 10. Ahmet Yıldızoğlu ✗ | 3,230 | 0.41 | ▲0.41 |
| HAS Party | None elected: 1. Nizam Gövce ✗; 2. Hüsamettin Aydın ✗; 3. Ayla Ayan ✗; 4. Songül Dağ ✗; 5. Veysal Karani Zortukoğlu ✗; 6. Cahit Ot ✗; 7. Muhammet Mücahit Filiz ✗; 8. Ahmet Yüksel ✗; 9. Uğur Ağırman ✗; 10. Mehmet Orhan ✗ | 2,960 | 0.37 | ▲0.37 |
| HEPAR | None elected: 1. Atila Duran ✗; 2. Beşir Çağan ✗; 3. İbrahim Hıdıroğlu ✗; 4. Mehmet Arslan ✗; 5. Fatma Eser ✗; 6. İzzet Melih Erozan ✗; 7. Medine Pınar Yörenç ✗; 8. Ebru Aydoğan ✗; 9. Bilal Arıcan ✗; 10. Orhan Korkut ✗ | 1,724 | 0.22 | ▲0.22 |
| Labour | None elected: 1. Mevlüt Bulgur ✗; 2. Şükran Ertaş ✗; 3. Mehmet Sarıkaş ✗; 4. Diren Zorlucan ✗; 5. Erdoğan Buyur ✗; 6. Servet Solmaz ✗; 7. Cavidan Nizamoğlu ✗; 8. Bahriye Kelleci ✗; 9. Cabir Güzel ✗; 10. Cemile Topaloğlu ✗ | 1,429 | 0.18 | ▲0.17 |
| DYP | None elected: 1. Maruf Kaymaz ✗; 2. Uğur Çalım ✗; 3. Yılmaz Geçer ✗; 4. Erdal Korkmaz ✗; 5. Bedrettin Tunç ✗; 6. Nurettin Yenen ✗; 7. Tekgül Aslıpek ✗; 8. Suna Hezer ✗; 9. İzzettin Tunçer ✗; 10. Ülger Göztepe ✗ | 1,085 | 0.14 | ▲0.14 |
| DSP | None elected: 1. Adnan Günal ✗; 2. Ali Bıkmaz ✗; 3. Cuma Yurttakul ✗; 4. Durmuş Arslan ✗; 5. Varol Gürbüz ✗; 6. Özer İşçi ✗; 7. Maşallah Erdoğan ✗; 8. Hüseyin Yenigün ✗; 9. Şerife Akkurt ✗; 10. Mehmet Gündüz ✗ | 875 | 0.11 | N/A |
| TKP | None elected: 1. Atıf Özbay ✗; 2. Nergiz Örs ✗; 3. Engin Kıra ✗; 4. Emsel Dede ✗; 5. Levent Paltacı ✗; 6. Sibel Çapar ✗; 7. Mehmet Ali Bağdatlı ✗; 8. İbrahim Doğan ✗; 9. Mustafa Toy ✗; 10. Necati Çapar ✗ | 690 | 0.09 | ▼0.13 |
| Nationalist Conservative | None elected: 1. Aysel Koç ✗; 2. Müslüm Gülistan ✗; 3. Hasan Elmas ✗; 4. Yahyahan Urfalıoğlu ✗; 5. Ayşe Şahin ✗; 6. Hasan Bayraktaroğlu ✗; 7. Şevket Solmaz ✗; 8. Mehmet Açıkgöz ✗; 9. Zeynep Boydaş ✗; 10. Gürbüz Ek ✗ | 571 | 0.07 | ▲0.07 |
| MP | None elected: 1. Mustafa Kundakçı ✗; 2. Harun Özeren ✗; 3. Ali İçin ✗; 4. Horik Yalçın ✗; 5. İsmail Bağdatlı ✗; 6. Medine Eraslan ✗; 7. Mehmet Nuri Aktar ✗; 8. Hülya Sıdan ✗; 9. Menekşe Nural Adıgüzel ✗; 10. Aysel Akarçay ✗ | 365 | 0.05 | ▲0.05 |
| Liberal Democrat | No candidates | 0 | 0.00 | 0.00 |
| Total votes | | 795,632 | 100.00 | |
| Rejected ballots | | 17,698 | 2.18 | ▲0.87 |
| Turnout | | 810,847 | 86.79 | ▲4.11 |
| AK Party hold Majority | | 47,118 | 5.81 | ▼3.88 |

=== June 2015 ===
| Abbr. | Party | Votes | % |
|---|---|---|---|
| AK Party | Justice and Development Party | 312,887 | 37.8% |
| CHP | Republican People's Party | 300,769 | 36.3% |
| MHP | Nationalist Movement Party | 116,062 | 14% |
| HDP | Peoples' Democratic Party | 54,456 | 6.6% |
| SP | Felicity Party | 13,430 | 1.6% |
| | Other | 30,322 | 3.7% |
| Total | | 827,926 | |
| Turnout | | 85.62 | |
source: YSK

=== November 2015 ===
| Abbr. | Party | Votes | % |
|---|---|---|---|
| AK Party | Justice and Development Party | 367,940 | 43.2% |
| CHP | Republican People's Party | 307,803 | 36.1% |
| MHP | Nationalist Movement Party | 104,885 | 12.3% |
| HDP | Peoples' Democratic Party | 57,533 | 6.8% |
| SP | Felicity Party | 3,807 | 0.4% |
| | Other | 10,161 | 1.2% |
| Total | | 852,129 | |
| Turnout | | 86.96 | |
source: YSK

=== 2018 ===
| Abbr. | Party | Votes | % |
|---|---|---|---|
| AK Party | Justice and Development Party | 320,185 | 35.1% |
| CHP | Republican People's Party | 281,145 | 30.9% |
| MHP | Nationalist Movement Party | 131,179 | 14.4% |
| HDP | Peoples' Democratic Party | 98,645 | 10.8% |
| IYI | Good Party | 59,911 | 6.6% |
| SP | Felicity Party | 8,189 | 0.9% |
| | Other | 12,026 | 1.3% |
| Total | | 911,280 | |
| Turnout | | 88.80 | |
source: YSK

== Presidential elections ==
=== 2014 ===
2014 presidential election: Hatay
| Party | Candidate | Votes | % |
|---|---|---|---|
| Independent | Ekmeleddin İhsanoğlu | 410,320 | 52.29 |
| AK Party | Recep Tayyip Erdoğan | 346,142 | 44.11 |
| HDP | Selahattin Demirtaş | 28,237 | 3.60 |
| Total votes | | 784,699 | 100.00 |
| Rejected ballots | | 10,472 | 1.32 |
| Turnout | | 795,171 | 82.15 |
| Ekmeleddin İhsanoğlu win | | | |
