= Bagshy =

Turkmen bard

A bagshy is a professional Turkmen bard who devotes his or her life to memorizing and reciting historical epics (dessan in Turkmen), typically accompanied by the traditional two-stringed instrument known as the dutar. Bagshys have enjoyed great respect in Turkmen society as guardians of the culture, and since independence in 1991, they have received greater support from the government.

In central Asia, the word bagshy (also spelt as baqshi or bakshi among other variants) refers to a bard or a shaman. The model Turkic bard is the legendary figure of Dede Korkut (or Qorqyt), who is also regarded as the saint and protector of all bagshy. Dede Korkut is the central figure in the epic The Book of Dede Korkut. He is also said to be the inventor of the two-stringed fiddle known as the qobyz, which is the preferred instrument of shamans.

The art of the bagshy is called the bagshychylyk in Turkmen and is handed down orally from one generation of bagshy to the next. The master (halypa) teaches the student (shagirt). Aspiring bagshys pay homage to patron figures such as Ashyk Aydyn Pir and Baba Gambar. The former's shrine is located in Dashoguz province in northern Turkmenistan. Traditionally the preserve of men, women are also now leading figures in the bagshy profession, among them Almagul Nazarowa, Soltanbagt Rejepowa and Bibinur Ashyrowa. The Smithsonian Institution notes that an apprentice bagshy must first perform a pilgrimage to a patron saint's mausoleum and must spend the night asking for the saint's blessing.
