= Yedigöller National Park =

National park in Bolu, Turkey

- Yedigöller Milli Parkı
- IUCN category II (national park)
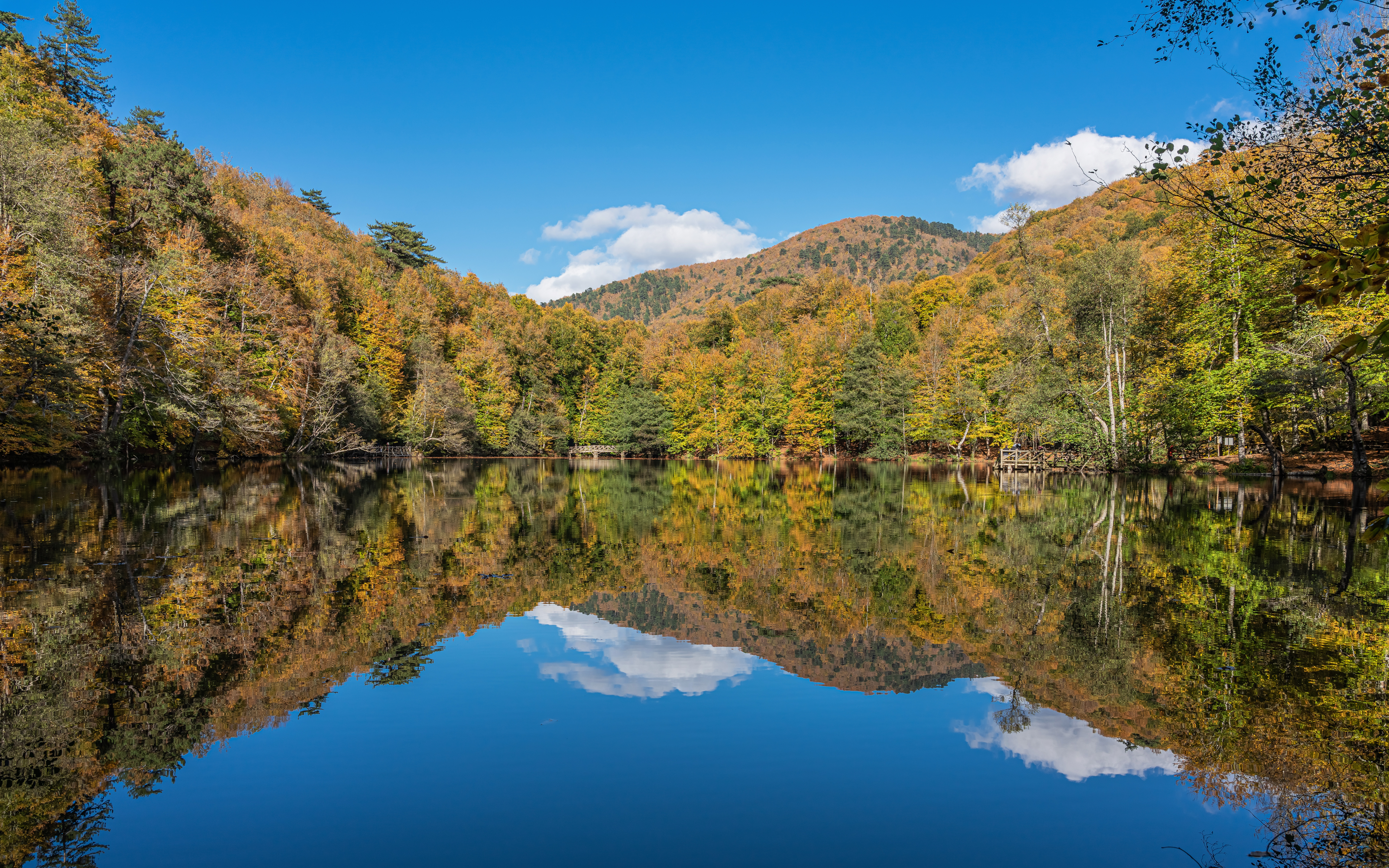
- Büyükgöl (Big Lake) in Yedigöller National Park

- Location within Turkey
- Location: Bolu Province, Turkey
- Nearest city: Bolu
- Coordinates: 40.943485°N 31.745502°E
- Area: 1,623 ha (6.27 sq mi)
- Established: 1965

The Yedigöller National Park (Turkish: Yedigöller, "seven lakes") also known as Seven Lakes National Park is located in the northern part of Bolu Province in Turkey. The park is categorized under IUCN II and was established in 1965. The park is best known for the seven lakes formed by landslides and for its profusion of plant life.

== Geography ==
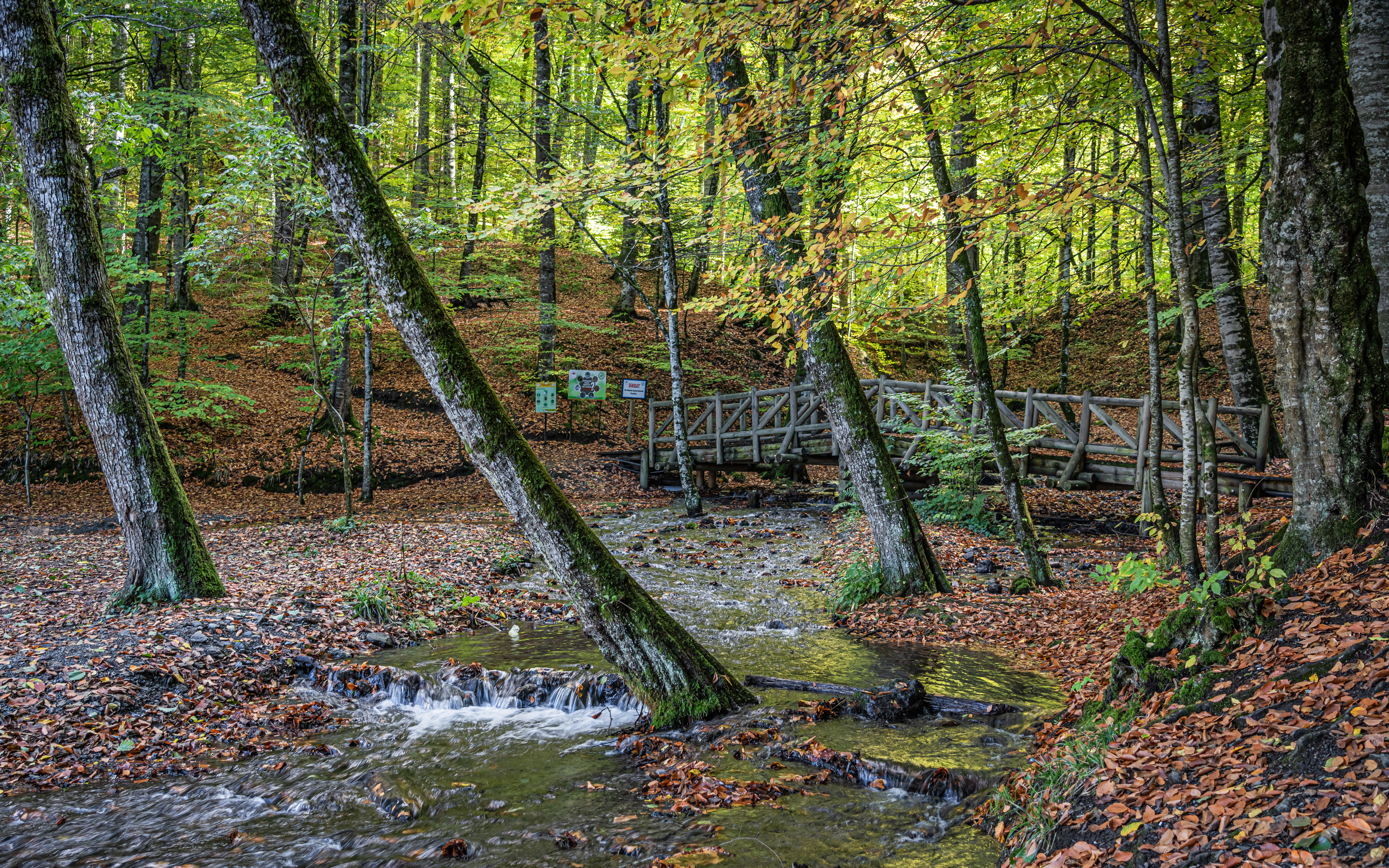
Stream at Deringöl

The park is located at an elevation of 900 metres (3,000 ft) in Mengen district in the north of Bolu Province and to the south of Zonguldak in the western Black Sea region. Established in 1965, it encompasses an area of 1,623 hectares (4,010 acres). There are seven lakes in the park which were formed due to landslides. The seven lakes are Büyükgöl, Deringöl, Seringöl, Nazlıgöl, Sazlıgöl, Incegöl and Küçükgöl. Several streams flow through the park some of which have handcrafted bridges across them and a small water fall.

The park is located between Istanbul and Ankara. Access is from the Yenicaga road, 152 kilometres (94 mi) from the Ankara – Istanbul highway. During the winter the alternate road is only from the Yenicaga – Mengen – Yazicik road. It is 42 kilometres (26 mi) to the north of Bolu. Kapankaya mountain peak is within the park and provides a vantage location to view the park's scenery. It is accessible all through the year.

The park also has trekking paths and camps to stay, in the form of tents, caravans, rest houses and bungalows. There are also hot springs in the park, and the ski centers here are well known in Turkey.

The specific studies related to Saprobic values of decayed organic matter of the park indicate a range between oligosaprobic and beta-mesosaprobic status. The water quality of the streams in the park is classified as Class I and II.

== Flora ==
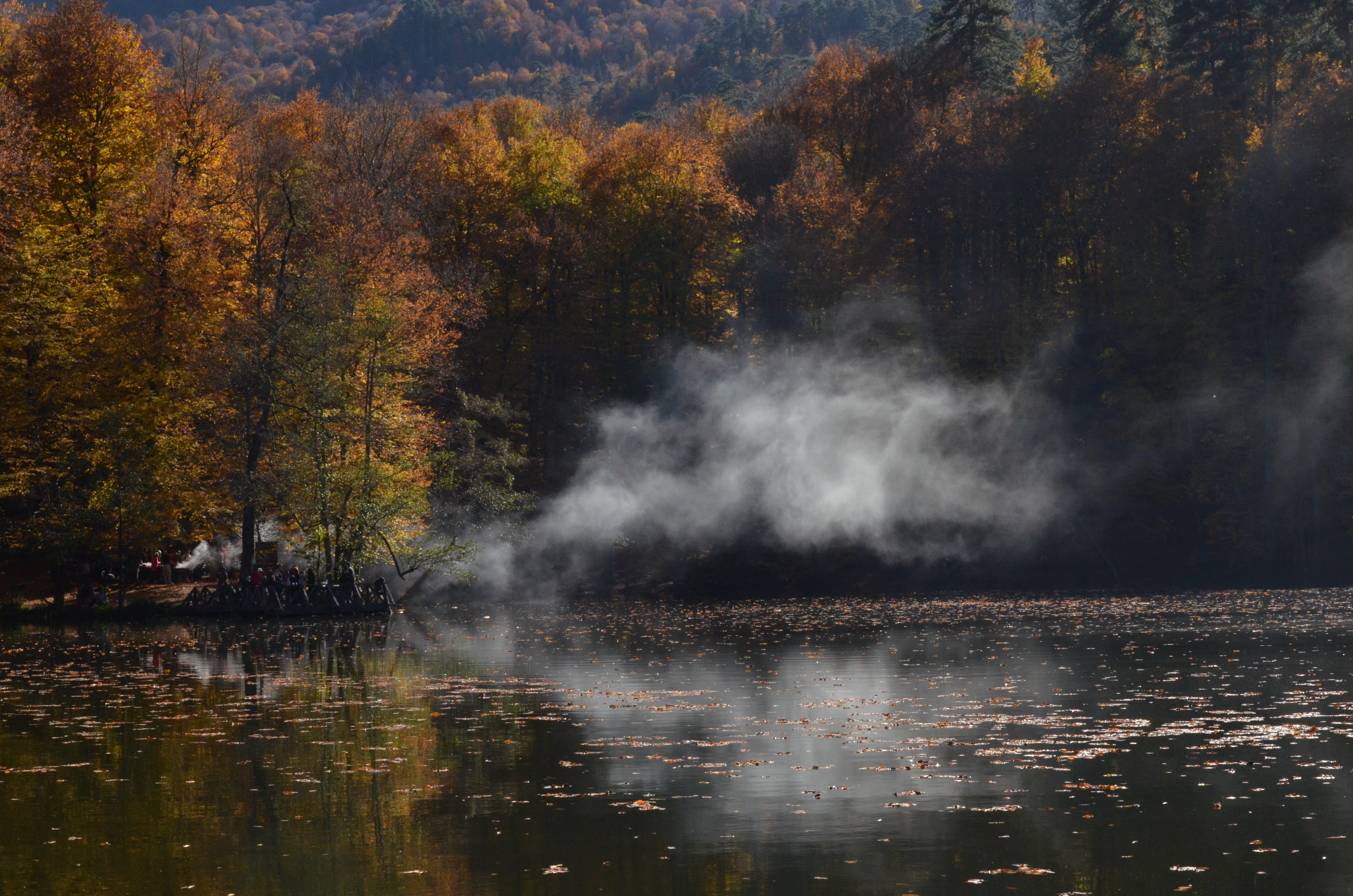
Colourful flora in the park

The vegetation consists of beech trees, oaks, hornbeams, firs, elms, hazel nuts, spruces, alders, lime trees, black pines and Scotch pines.

== Fauna ==
Wildlife within the park includes, but is not limited to, red deer, roe deer, wild boar, brown bears, wolves, red fox, lynx, jungle cats, otters and squirrels. As result of better protection conditions in the park the population of animals has increased. The park has an exclusive protected area for deer. A trout farm has also been established in the park. New insect species Ephemeroptera identified in the park are Ecdyonurus starmachi, Paraleptophlebia cincta, Caenis martae, and Baetis lapponicus.

== Gallery ==
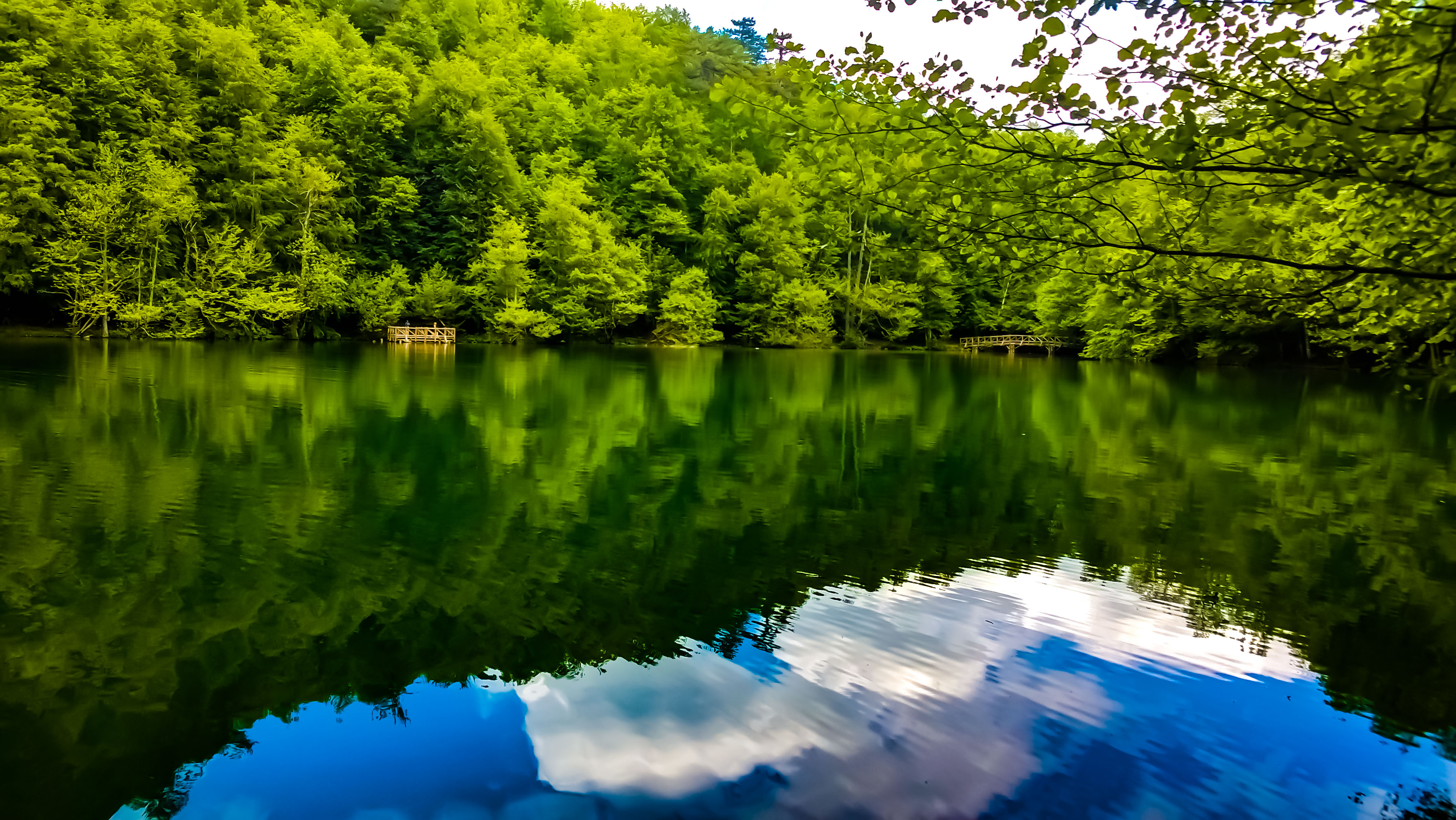
Yedigöller

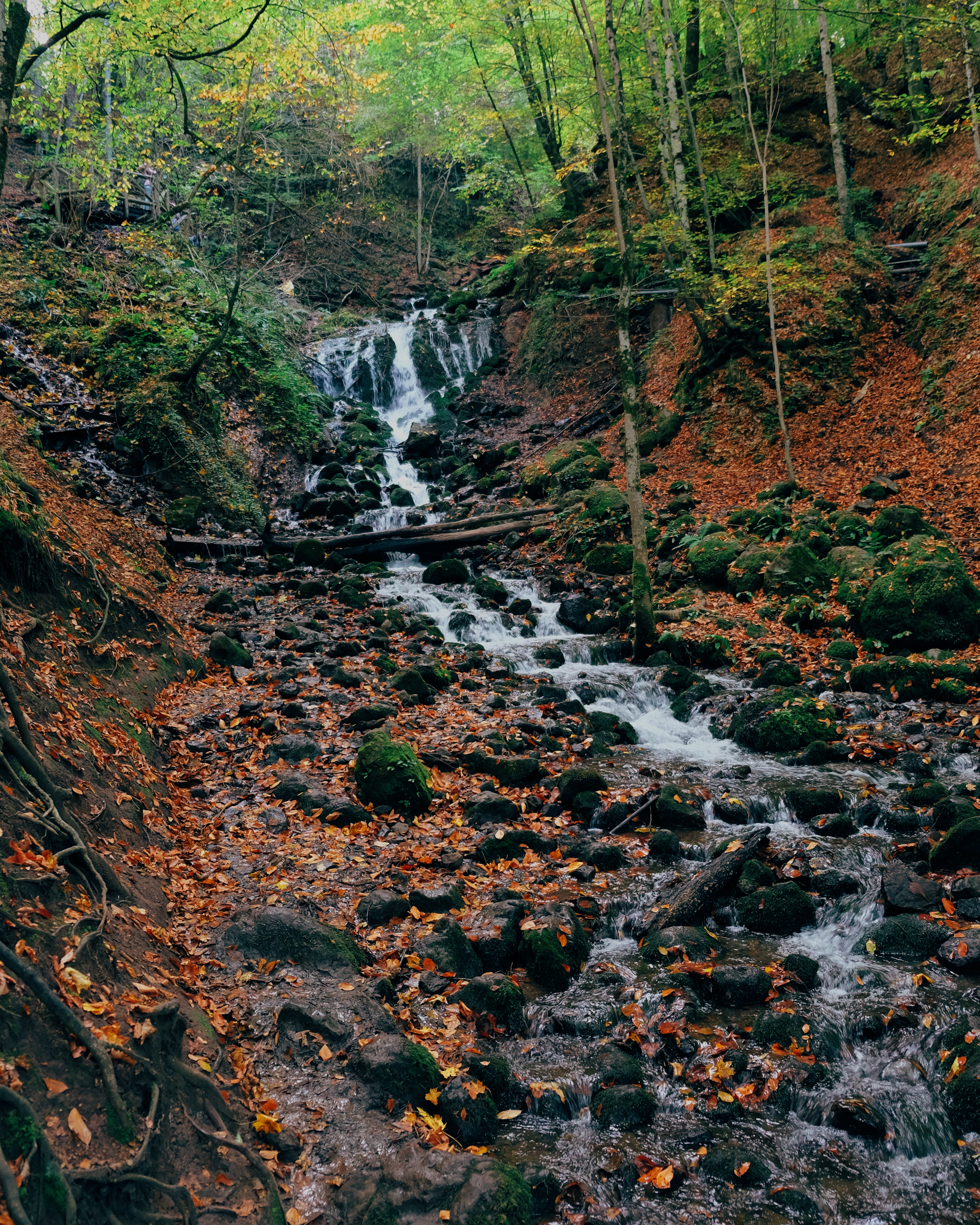
Yedigöller waterfall

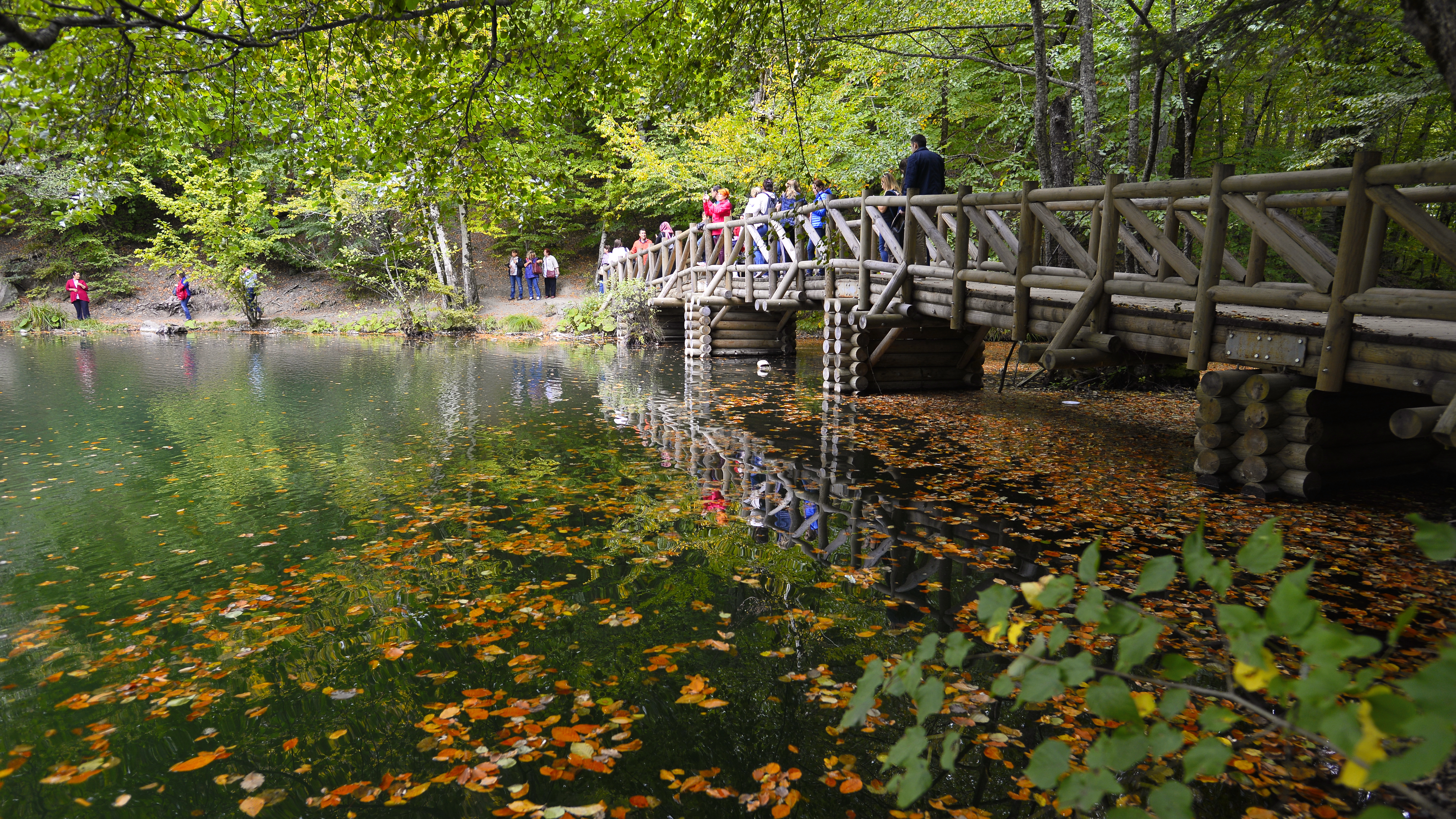
A view from Bolu Yedigöller National Park in the Autumn.

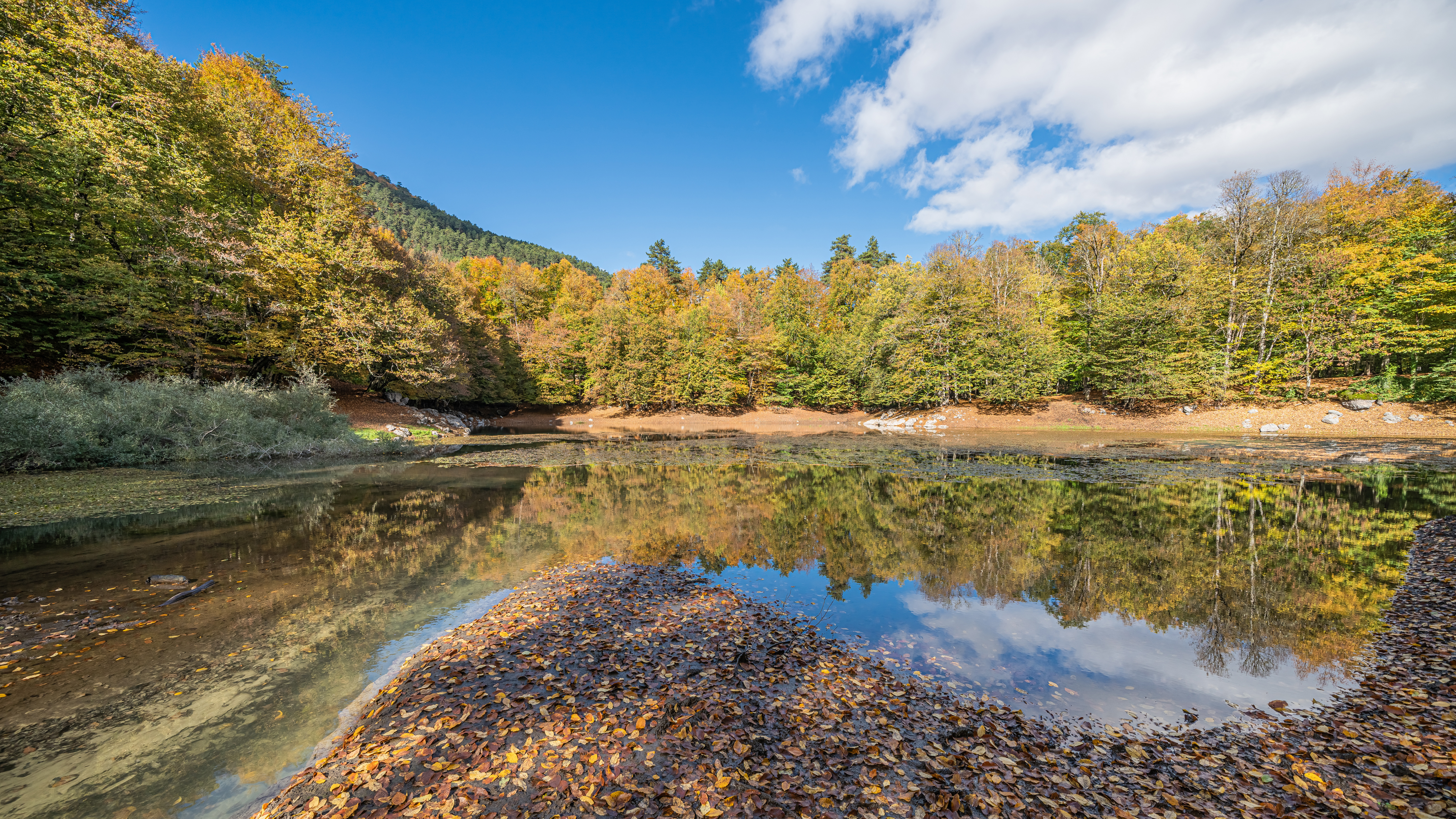
The Seven Lakes' valley of Yedigöller National Park, Turkey. Photo shows Nazlıgöl (Coy Lake).

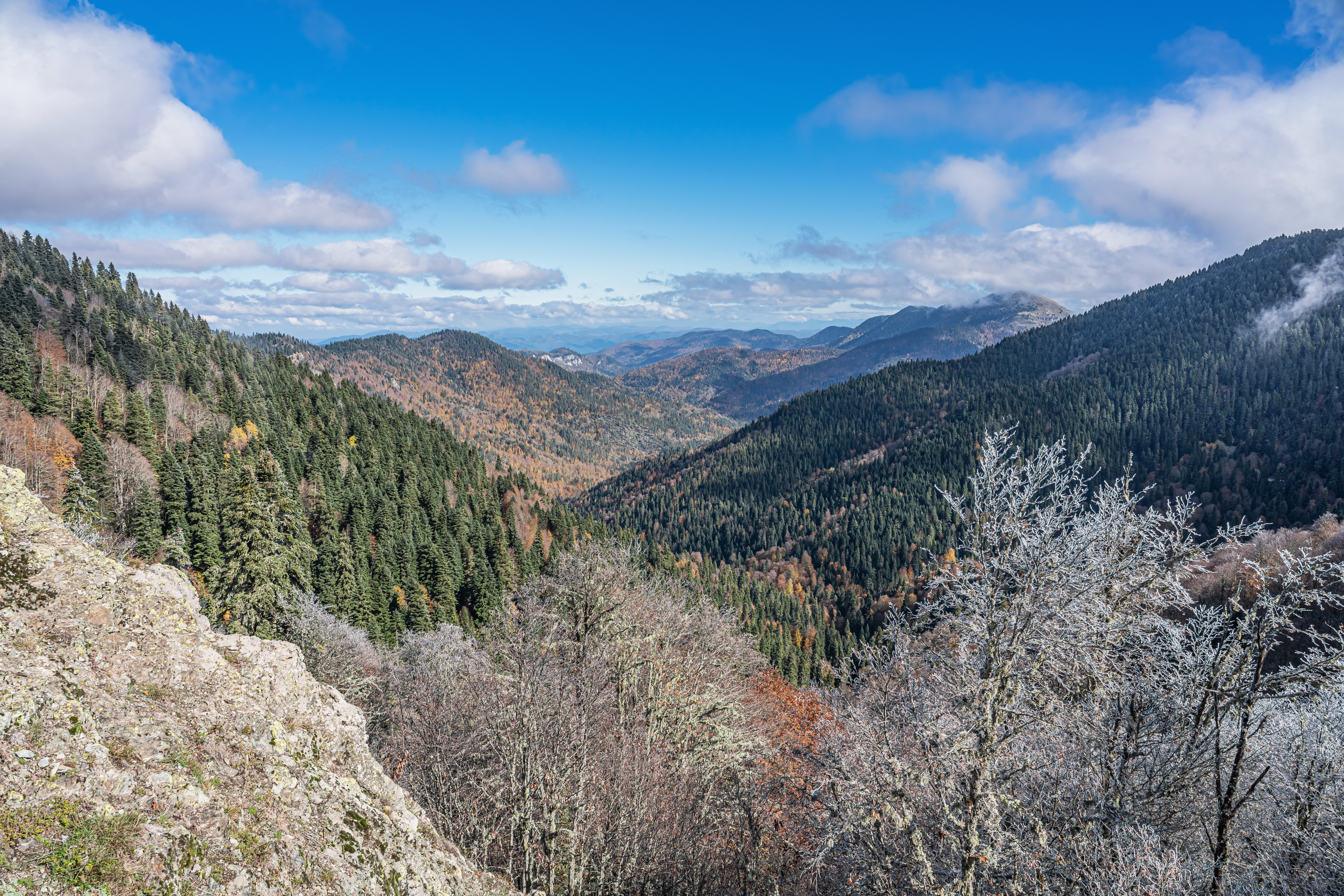
Yedigöller mountain range

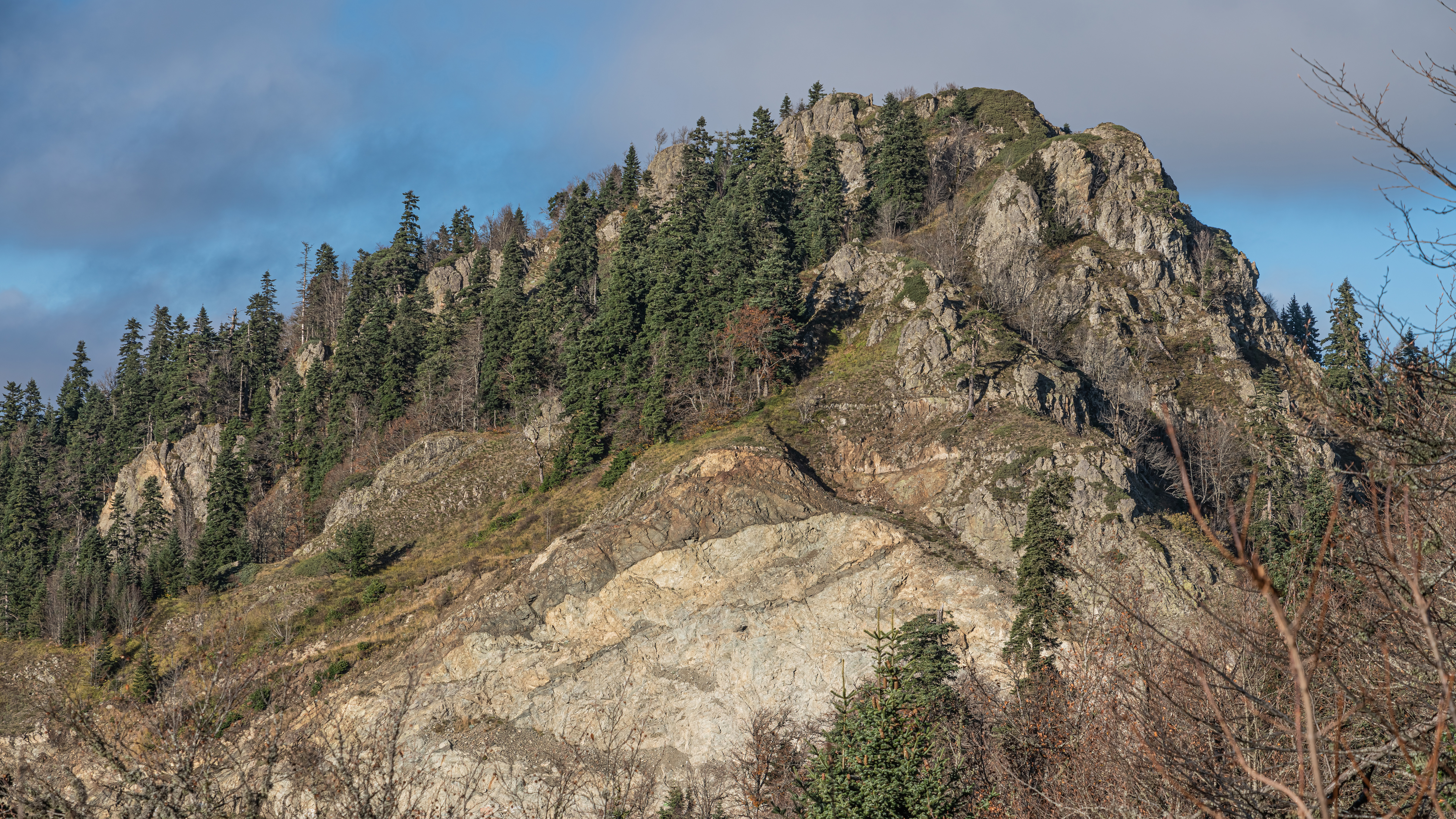
Landscape in the highland part of Yedigöller National Park, Turkey

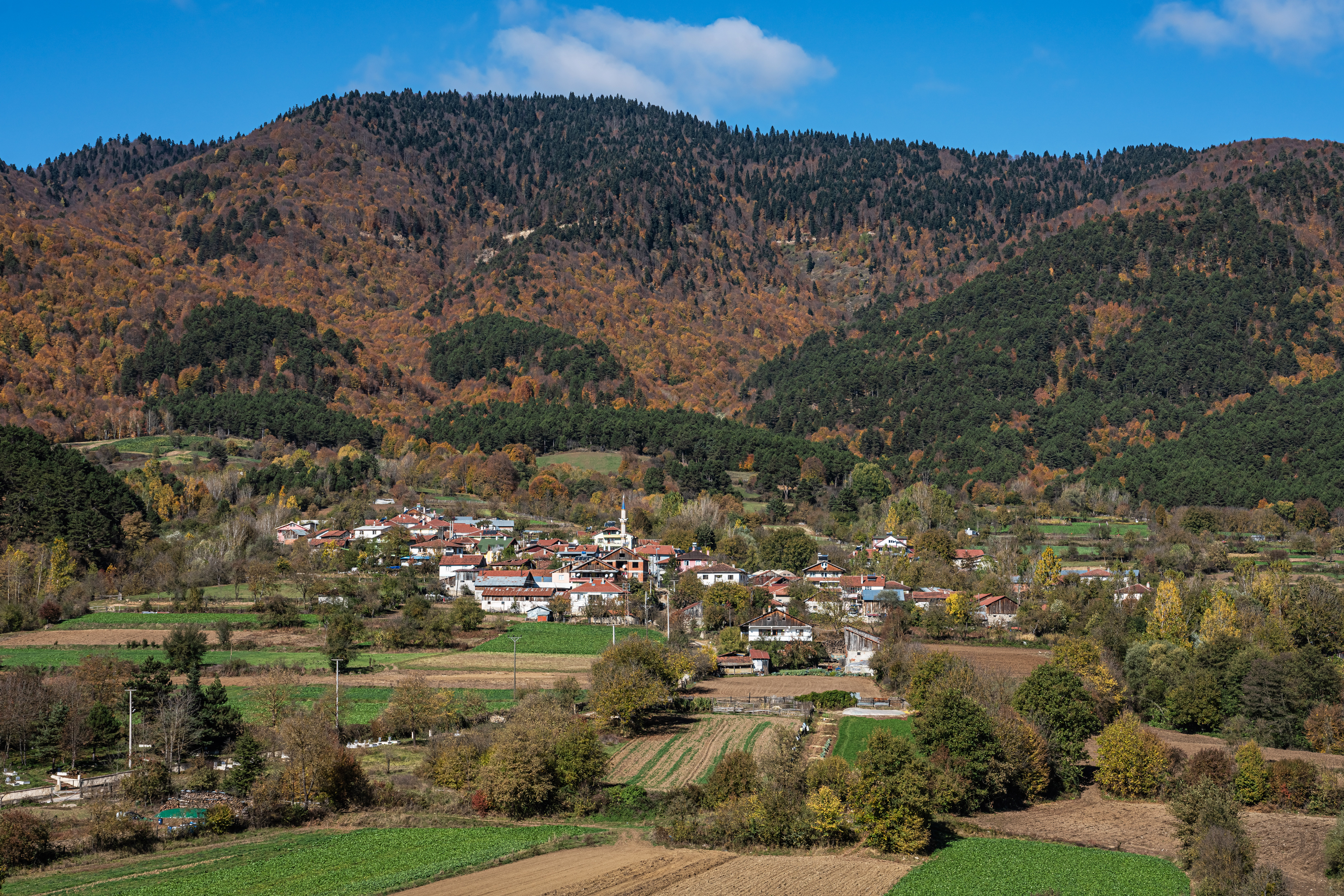
View of Çukurören village between Bolu and Yedigöller, Bolu Province.

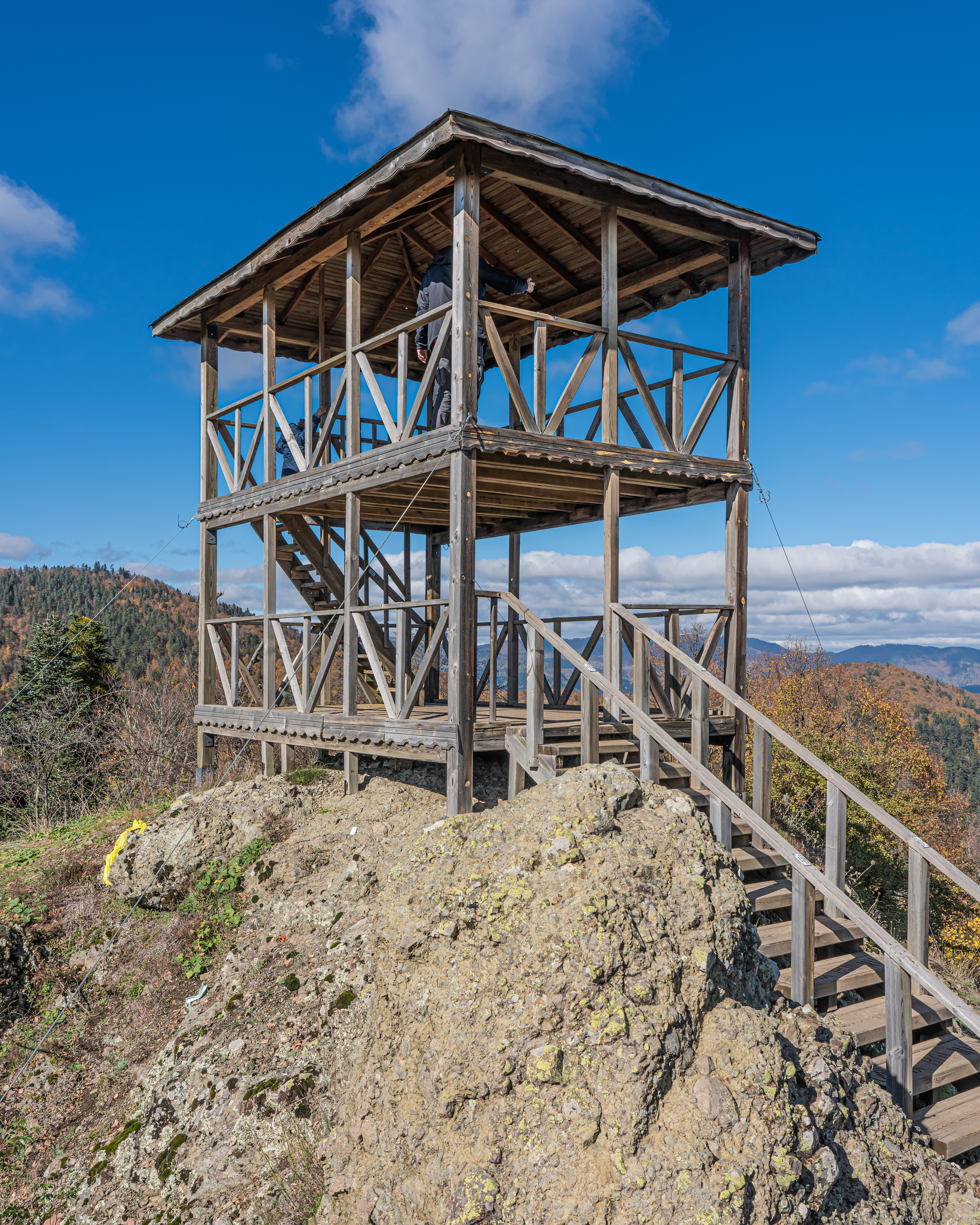
Scenic overlook terrace in the highland part of Yedigöller National Park

== Bibliography ==
- Centre, World Conservation Monitoring; Areas, IUCN Commission on National Parks and Protected (1 January 1990). 1990 United Nations List of National Parks and Protected Areas. IUCN. pp. ref. ISBN 978-2-8317-0032-8.
