= Akçakoca (disambiguation) =

Akçakoca is a town and district of Düzce Province, Turkey.

Akçakoca may also refer to:

- Akçakoca, Mengen, a village in the district of Mengen, Bolu Province, Turkey
- Akçakoca gas field, an offshore natural gas field on the Black Sea

== See also ==
- Akçakocalı, Tarsus, a small village in Tarsus district of Mersin Province, Turkey
