= Çukurca (disambiguation) =

Çukurca may refer to:

- Çukurca
- Çukurca, Gerede
- Çukurca, Kızılcahamam
- Çukurca, Korkuteli
- Çukurca, Kulp
- Çukurca, Kurşunlu
- Çukurca, Mengen
- Çukurca, Sandıklı
- Çukurca, Seyitgazi, a village in the Seyitgazi District of Eskişehir Province, Turkey
