= Gerede District =

District of Bolu Province, Turkey

- District
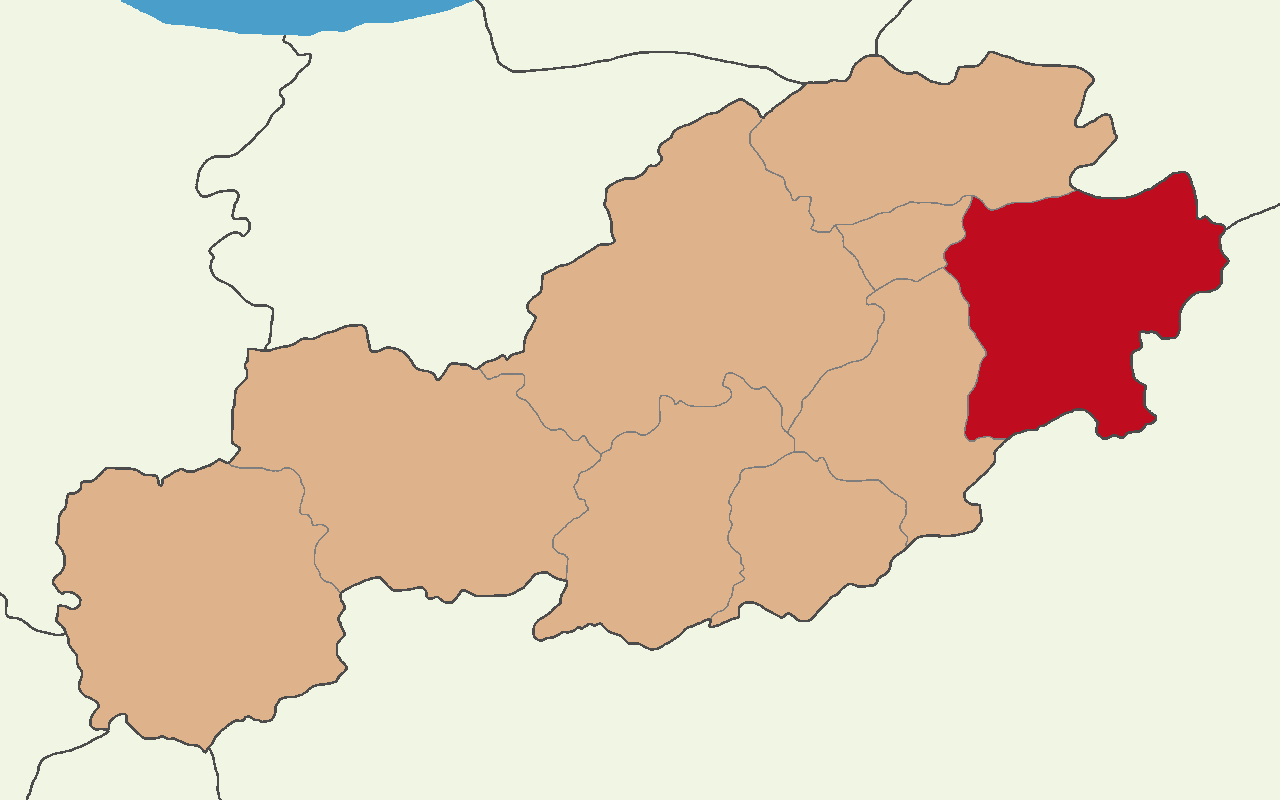
- Map showing Gerede District in Bolu Province

- Location in Turkey
- Coordinates: 40°48′N 32°12′E
- Country: Turkey
- Province: Bolu
- Seat: Gerede

Government
  - Kaymakam: Bilal Çelik
- Area: 1,060 km^{2} (410 sq mi)
- Population (2021): 33,833
  - Density: 31.9/km^{2} (82.7/sq mi)
- Time zone: UTC+3 (TRT)
- Website: www.gerede.gov.tr

Gerede District is a district of the Bolu Province of Turkey. Its seat is the town of Gerede. Its area is 1,060 km^{2}, and its population is 33,833 (2021). Gerede is a large area of hill country surrounded by pine-covered mountains, on a passage from central Anatolia to the Black Sea coast. The climate is notoriously cold and wet, enough to make it a centre for cross-country skiing, and traffic on the highway often has to negotiate fog, rain and ice around Gerede.

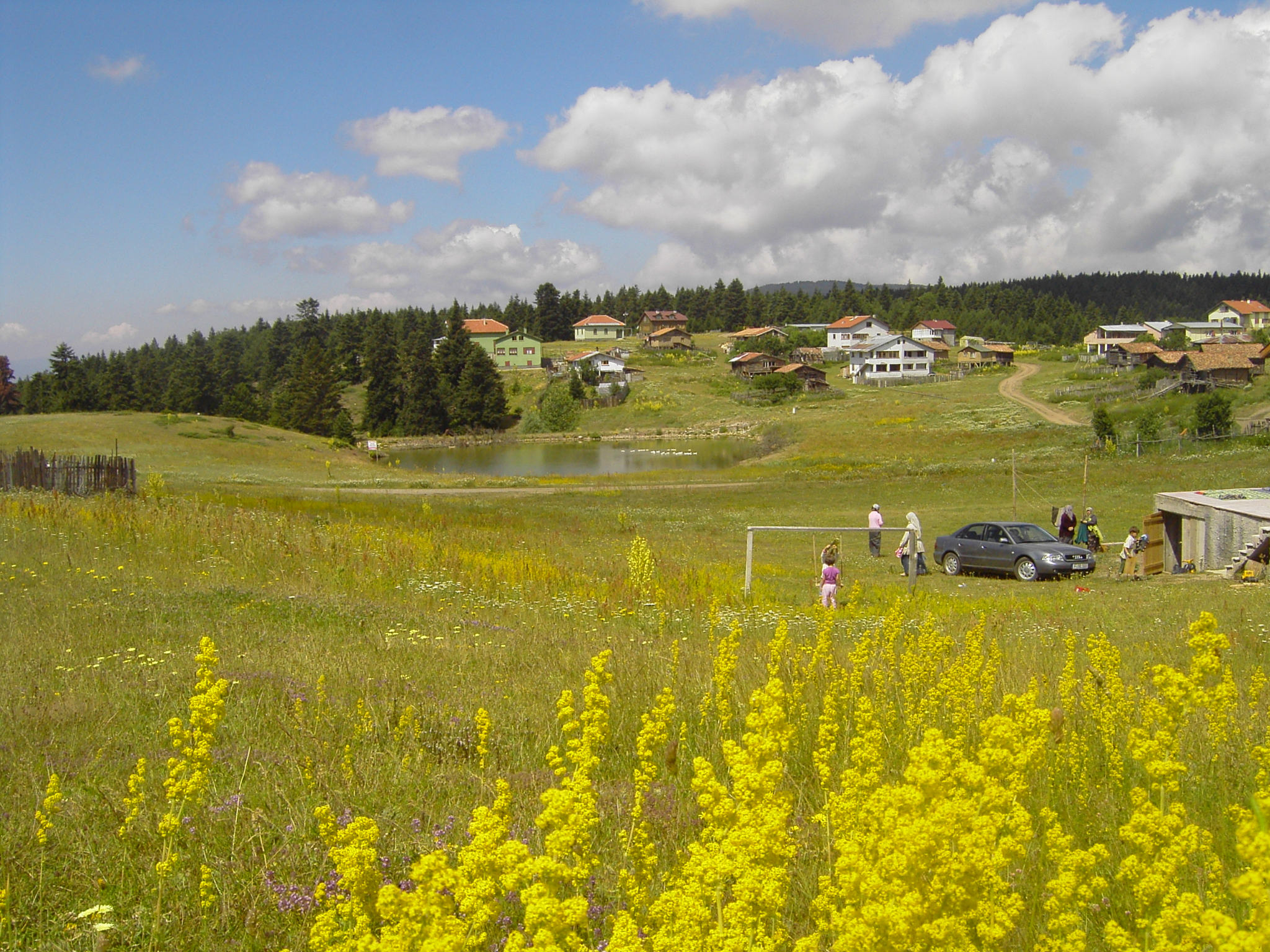
Afşartarakçı Summer Pasture

In 1928, the administrative centre of Gerede District, which was part of Bolu Province, was Gerede town. Gerede District consisted of the sub-districts (nahiye) of Merkez and Mengen. There were 106 villages in the Merkez sub-district and 32 villages in the Mengen sub-district. In the 1940 census, the Yeniçağa sub-district was added to the Gerede District. At that time, there were 121 villages in the Merkez subdistrict, 81 villages in the Mengen sub-district, and 17 villages in the Yeniçağa subdistrict. The total population of the District of Gerede was 56,161, comprising 24,094 men and 32,067 women. In the 1965 census, the population of the District of Gerede was determined to be 56,569, of which 17,638 were recorded as literate. At that time, Gerede District consisted of the sub-districts of Merkez, Dörtdivan and Yeniçağa. Mengen had been separated from this district and made into a district of its own.

== Composition ==
There is one municipality in Gerede District:

- Gerede

There are 92 villages in Gerede District:

- Afşartarakçı
- Ağızörengüney
- Ahmetler
- Akbaş
- Akçabey
- Akçaşehir
- Aktaş
- Aktaşkurtlar
- Aşağıörenbaşı
- Aşağıovacık
- Asmaca
- Aydınlar
- Bahçedere
- Balcılar
- Beşkonak
- Birinciafşar
- Bünüş
- Çağış
- Çalaman
- Çalışlar
- Çayören
- Çayörengüney
- Çoğullu
- Çukurca
- Dağkara
- Danişmentler
- Davutbeyli
- Demircisopran
- Demirler
- Dikmen
- Dursunfakı
- Elören
- Enseliler
- Ertuğrulköy
- Eymür
- Geçitler
- Göynükören
- Güneydemirciler
- Hacılar
- Halaçlar
- Hasanlar
- Havullu
- Ibrıcak
- İkinciafşar
- İmamlar
- İnköy
- Kalaç
- Kapaklı
- Karacadağ
- Karacadağdemirciler
- Karapazar
- Kavacık
- Kayıkiraz
- Kayısopran
- Kazanlar
- Koçumlar
- Kösreli
- Külef
- Kürkçüler
- Macarlar
- Mangallar
- Mircekiraz
- Mukamlar
- Muratfakılar
- Mürdükler
- Nuhören
- Örencik
- Ortaca
- Salur
- Samat
- Sapanlıurgancılar
- Sarıoğlu
- Sipahiler
- Sofular
- Süllertoklar
- Sungurlar
- Tatlar
- Ulaşlar
- Ümitköy
- Yağdaş
- Yakaboy
- Yakakaya
- Yazıkara
- Yazıköy
- Yelkenler
- Yenecik
- Yeniyapar
- Yeşilvadi
- Yukarıörenbaşı
- Yukarıovacık
- Yunuslar
- Zeyneller
