= Yukarıovacık =

Yukarıovacık (literally "upper little plains" in Turkish) may refer to the following places in Turkey:

- Yukarıovacık, Gerede, a village in the district of Gerede, Bolu Province
- Yukarıovacık, Hamamözü, a village in the district of Hamamözü, Amasya Province
- Yukarıovacık, Karakoçan
