= Pazarköy, Bolu =

Pazarköy
- Village
- Location within Turkey
- Coordinates: 40°56′N 32°11′E
- Country: Turkey
- Province: Bolu
- District: Mengen
- Elevation: 710 m (2,330 ft)
- Population (2021): 480
- Time zone: UTC+3 (TRT)
- Postal code: 14840
- Area code: 0374

Pazarköy (literally "market village" in Turkish), is a village in the Mengen District, Bolu Province, Turkey. Its population is 480 (2021). Before the 2013 reorganisation, it was a town (belde).

== Geography ==
Pazarköy is situated along the Mengen creek. The distance to District of Mengen is 10 kilometres (6.2 mi) and to Bolu 70 kilometres (43 mi). The town, being close to the North Anatolian fault, has been hit by earthquakes several times.

== History ==
The area around Pazarköy was a part of Bithynia in antiquity and the Byzantine Empire in the early Middle Ages. The area was annexed by Beyazıt I of the Ottoman Empire in 1395. After a brief Isfendiyarid occupation during Ottoman Interregnum between 1402 and 1413, it was recaptured by Murat II and continued as a part of Turkey thereafter. In 1992, it was declared a seat of township.

== Economy ==
Due to lack of adequate agricultural land, the population of the town is declining. Some citizens prefer to work in other Turkish cities as cooks (the trademark profession of the Mengen district). Others work in forestry and forest-based industry .
