= İnköy =

İnköy can refer to:

- İnköy, Gerede
- İnköy, Ilgaz
- İnköy, Tarsus
