= Akçaşehir =

Akçaşehir (literally "quite white city/town" in Turkish) may refer to the following places in Turkey:

- Akçaşehir, Karaman, a town in the district of Karaman, Karaman Province, Turkey
- Akçaşehir, Gerede, a village in the district of Gerede, Bolu Province, Turkey

== See also ==
- Akçakoca, formerly Akçaşehir
