= Sarıoğlu =

Sarıoğlu may refer to

== People ==
- Aylin Sarıoğlu (born 1995), Turkish female volleyball player
- Sabri Sarıoğlu (born 1984), Turkish football player

== Places ==
- Sarıoğlu, Gerede, a village at Gerede district of Bolu Province in Turkey
