= Gökçesu =

- Municipality
- Location in Turkey
- Coordinates: 40°54′N 31°57′E
- Country: Turkey
- Province: Bolu
- District: Mengen
- Elevation: 535 m (1,755 ft)
- Population (2021): 1,842
- Time zone: UTC+3 (TRT)
- Postal code: 14850
- Area code: 0374

Gökçesu is a town (belde) in the Mengen District, Bolu Province, Turkey. Its population is 1,842 (2021). It is situated in the forest between two mountain ranges. The distance to Mengen is 11 kilometres (6.8 mi) and to Bolu is 50 kilometres (31 mi). Up to 73 BC, the area around the town was a part of Bithynia Kingdom. Then it became a part of the Roman and the Byzantine Empires. In 1359 it was incorporated into the Ottoman Empire. In 1991 it was declared a seat of township.
