= Bölükören, Mengen =

Bölükören
- Village
- Location within Turkey
- Coordinates: 40.9593°N 32.0241°E
- Country: Turkey
- Province: Bolu
- District: Mengen
- Population (2021): 43
- Time zone: UTC+3 (TRT)

Bölükören is a village in the Mengen District, Bolu Province, Turkey. Its population is 43 (2021).
