= Çırdak, Mengen =

Çırdak
- Village
- Location within Turkey
- Coordinates: 40.9669°N 32.1917°E
- Country: Turkey
- Province: Bolu
- District: Mengen
- Population (2021): 78
- Time zone: UTC+3 (TRT)

Çırdak is a village in the Mengen District, Bolu Province, Turkey. Its population is 78 (2021).
