= Asmaca, Gerede =

Asmaca
- Village
- Location within Turkey
- Coordinates: 40.8288°N 32.5358°E
- Country: Turkey
- Province: Bolu
- District: Gerede
- Population (2021): 109
- Time zone: UTC+3 (TRT)

Asmaca is a village located in Gerede District, of Bolu Province, Turkey. As of 2021 its population is 109.
