= Danişmentler, Gerede =

Danişmentler
- Village
- Location within Turkey
- Coordinates: 40.7103°N 32.3050°E
- Country: Turkey
- Province: Bolu
- District: Gerede
- Population (2021): 57
- Time zone: UTC+3 (TRT)

Danişmentler is a village in the Gerede District, Bolu Province, Turkey. Its population is 57 (2021).
