= Kavacık, Mengen =

Kavacık
- Village
- Location within Turkey
- Coordinates: 40.9764°N 32.1525°E
- Country: Turkey
- Province: Bolu
- District: Mengen
- Population (2021): 123
- Time zone: UTC+3 (TRT)

Kavacık is a village in the Mengen District, Bolu Province, Turkey. Its population is 123 (2021).
