= Güneygökçesu =

- Village
- Location within Turkey
- Coordinates: 40°54′N 31°54′E
- Country: Turkey
- Province: Bolu
- District: Mengen
- Population (2021): 39
- Time zone: UTC+3 (TRT)

Güneygökçesu is a village in the Mengen District, Bolu Province, Turkey. Its population is 39 (2021).
