= Sapanlıurgancılar, Gerede =

Sapanlıurgancılar
- Village
- Location within Turkey
- Coordinates: 40°45′N 32°13′E
- Country: Turkey
- Province: Bolu
- District: Gerede
- Population (2021): 98
- Time zone: UTC+3 (TRT)

Sapanlıurgancılar is a village in the Gerede District, Bolu Province, Turkey. Its population is 98 (2021).
