= Macarlar, Gerede =

Macarlar
- Village
- Location within Turkey
- Country: Turkey
- Province: Bolu
- District: Gerede
- Population (2021): 66
- Time zone: UTC+3 (TRT)

Macarlar is a village in the Gerede District of Bolu Province, Turkey. Its population is 66 (2021).
