= Kösreli, Gerede =

Kösreli
- Village
- Location within Turkey
- Coordinates: 40.7602°N 32.3835°E
- Country: Turkey
- Province: Bolu
- District: Gerede
- Population (2021): 39
- Time zone: UTC+3 (TRT)

Kösreli is a village in the Gerede District, Bolu Province, Turkey. Its population is 39 (2021).
