= Aktepe, Mengen =

Aktepe
- Village
- Location within Turkey
- Coordinates: 40.8950°N 32.1441°E
- Country: Turkey
- Province: Bolu
- District: Mengen
- Population (2021): 65
- Time zone: UTC+3 (TRT)

Aktepe is a village in the Mengen District, Bolu Province, Turkey. Its population is 65 (2021).

== Geography ==
Aktepe is located 123 kilometers directly from Ankara, the capital of Turkey, and 266 kilometers from Istanbul, the country's largest city.
