= Teberikler, Mengen =

Teberikler
- Village
- Location within Turkey
- Coordinates: 40°57′N 32°08′E
- Country: Turkey
- Province: Bolu
- District: Mengen
- Population (2021): 65
- Time zone: UTC+3 (TRT)

Teberikler is a village in the Mengen District, Bolu Province, Turkey. Its population is 65 (2021).
