= Dursunfakı, Gerede =

Dursunfakı
- Village
- Location within Turkey
- Coordinates: 40°44′N 32°14′E
- Country: Turkey
- Province: Bolu
- District: Gerede
- Population (2021): 74
- Time zone: UTC+3 (TRT)

Dursunfakı is a village in the Gerede District, Bolu Province, Turkey. Its population is 74 (2021).
