= Yumrutaş, Mengen =

Yumrutaş
- Village
- Location within Turkey
- Coordinates: 40°52′10.58239″N 32°4′59.9664″E
- Country: Turkey
- Province: Bolu
- District: Mengen
- Population (2021): 89
- Time zone: UTC+3 (TRT)

Yumrutaş is a village in the Mengen District, Bolu Province, Turkey. Its population is 89 (2021).
