= Geçitler, Gerede =

Geçitler
- Village
- Location within Turkey
- Coordinates: 40°43′N 32°12′E
- Country: Turkey
- Province: Bolu
- District: Gerede
- Population (2021): 116
- Time zone: UTC+3 (TRT)

Geçitler is a village in the Gerede District, Bolu Province, Turkey. Its population is 116 (2021).
