= Hacıahmetler, Mengen =

Hacıahmetler
- Village
- Location within Turkey
- Coordinates: 40.9429°N 32.0533°E
- Country: Turkey
- Province: Bolu
- District: Mengen
- Population (2021): 153
- Time zone: UTC+3 (TRT)

Hacıahmetler is a village in the Mengen District, Bolu Province, Turkey. Its population is 153 (2021).
