= Sarıkadılar, Mengen =

Sarıkadılar
- Village
- Location within Turkey
- Coordinates: 40°57′N 32°16′E
- Country: Turkey
- Province: Bolu
- District: Mengen
- Population (2021): 96
- Time zone: UTC+3 (TRT)

Sarıkadılar is a village in the Mengen District, Bolu Province, Turkey. Its population is 96 (2021).
