= Sungurlar, Gerede =

Sungurlar
- Village
- Location within Turkey
- Coordinates: 40°47′N 32°16′E
- Country: Turkey
- Province: Bolu
- District: Gerede
- Population (2021): 67
- Time zone: UTC+3 (TRT)

Sungurlar is a village in the Gerede District, Bolu Province, Turkey. Its population is 67 (2021).
