= Kayışlar, Mengen =

Kayışlar
- Village
- Location within Turkey
- Coordinates: 40.8584°N 31.8878°E
- Country: Turkey
- Province: Bolu
- District: Mengen
- Population (2021): 128
- Time zone: UTC+3 (TRT)

Kayışlar is a village in the Mengen District, Bolu Province, Turkey. Its population is 128 (2021).
