= Turna, Mengen =

Turna
- Village
- Location within Turkey
- Coordinates: 40.9000°N 31.9230°E
- Country: Turkey
- Province: Bolu
- District: Mengen
- Population (2021): 73
- Time zone: UTC+3 (TRT)

Turna (also: Turnaköy) is a village in the Mengen District, Bolu Province, Turkey. Its population is 73 (2021).
