= Hacılar, Gerede =

Hacılar
- Village
- Location within Turkey
- Coordinates: 40.6892°N 32.2354°E
- Country: Turkey
- Province: Bolu
- District: Gerede
- Population (2021): 36
- Time zone: UTC+3 (TRT)

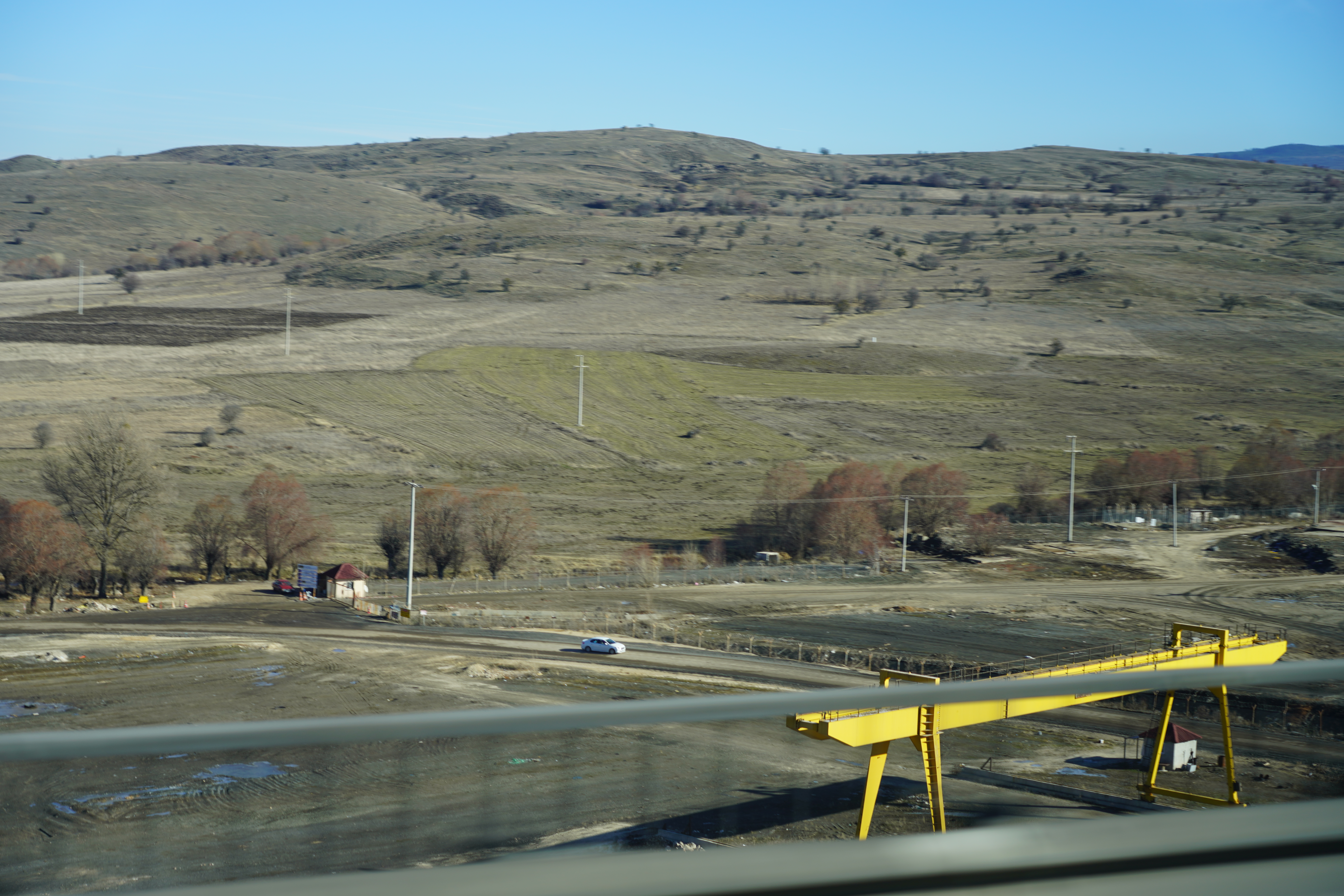

Hacılar is a village in the Gerede District, Bolu Province, Turkey. Its population is 36 (2021).
