= Nazırlar, Mengen =

Nazırlar
- Village
- Location within Turkey
- Coordinates: 40°55′N 32°08′E
- Country: Turkey
- Province: Bolu
- District: Mengen
- Population (2021): 95
- Time zone: UTC+3 (TRT)

Nazırlar is a village in the Mengen District, Bolu Province, Turkey. Its population is 95 (2021).
