= Kapaklı, Gerede =

Kapaklı
- Village
- Location within Turkey
- Coordinates: 40.8351°N 32.4259°E
- Country: Turkey
- Province: Bolu
- District: Gerede
- Population (2021): 135
- Time zone: UTC+3 (TRT)

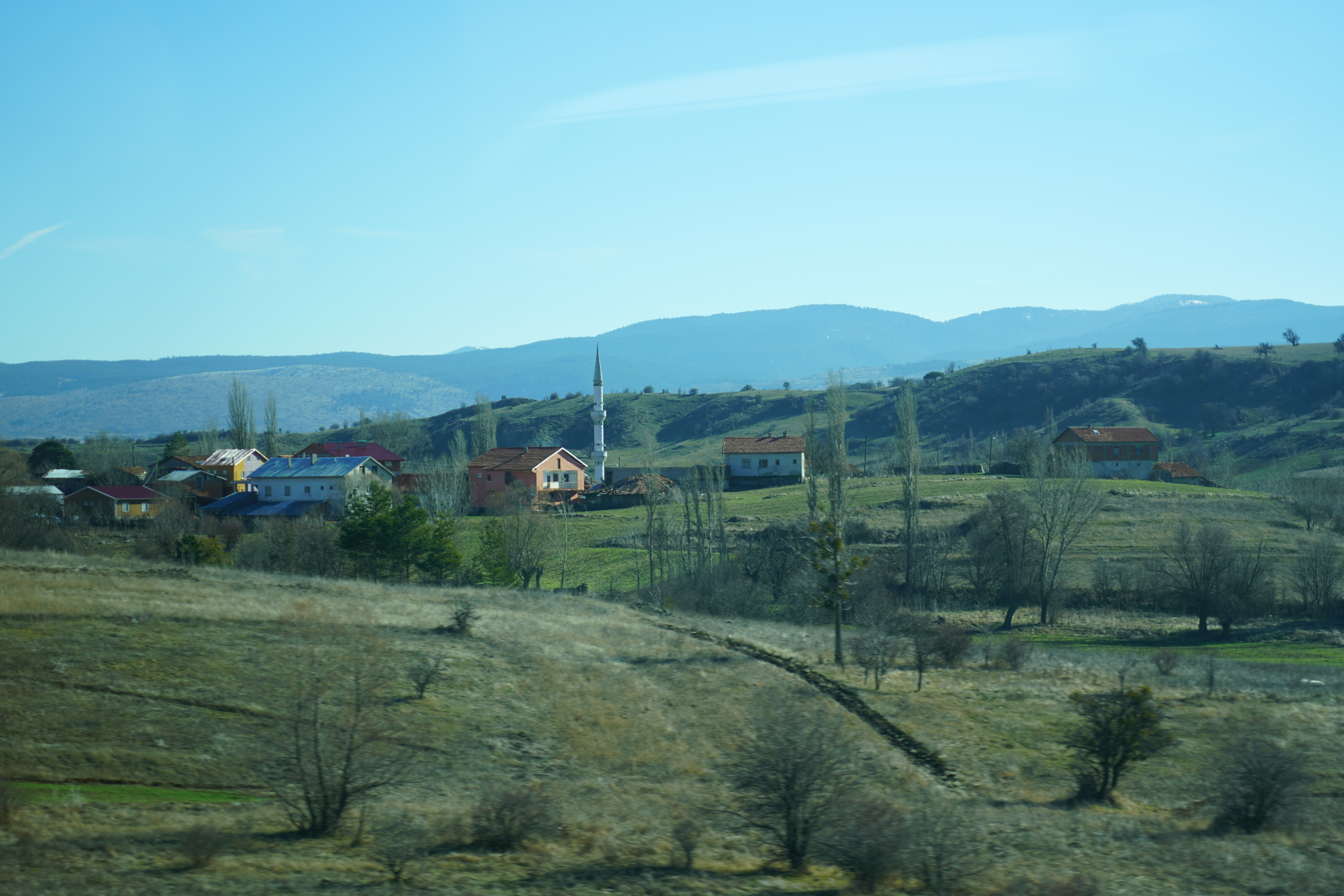
Village of Kapaklı

Kapaklı is a village in the Gerede District, Bolu Province, Turkey. Its population is 135 (2021).
