= Arak, Mengen =

Arak
- Village
- Location within Turkey
- Coordinates: 40.9442°N 32.2394°E
- Country: Turkey
- Province: Bolu
- District: Mengen
- Population (2021): 63
- Time zone: UTC+3 (TRT)

Arak is a village in the Mengen District, Bolu Province, Turkey. Its population is 63 (2021).
