= Konak, Mengen =

Konak
- Village
- Location within Turkey
- Coordinates: 40.9434°N 32.0868°E
- Country: Turkey
- Province: Bolu
- District: Mengen
- Population (2021): 139
- Time zone: UTC+3 (TRT)

Konak (also: Konakköy) is a village in the Mengen District, Bolu Province, Turkey. Its population is 139 (2021).
