= Kayıkiraz, Gerede =

Kayıkiraz
- Village
- Location within Turkey
- Coordinates: 40°44′N 32°17′E
- Country: Turkey
- Province: Bolu
- District: Gerede
- Population (2021): 68
- Time zone: UTC+3 (TRT)

Kayıkiraz is a village in the Gerede District, Bolu Province, Turkey. Its population is 68 (2021).
