= Alibeyler, Mengen =

Alibeyler
- Village
- Location within Turkey
- Coordinates: 40.9352°N 32.2242°E
- Country: Turkey
- Province: Bolu
- District: Mengen
- Population (2021): 86
- Time zone: UTC+3 (TRT)

Alibeyler is a village in the Mengen District, Bolu Province, Turkey. Its population is 86 (2021).
