= Kalaç, Gerede =

Kalaç
- Village
- Location within Turkey
- Coordinates: 40.7686°N 32.3580°E
- Country: Turkey
- Province: Bolu
- District: Gerede
- Population (2021): 79
- Time zone: UTC+3 (TRT)

Kalaç is a village in the Gerede District, Bolu Province, Turkey. Its population is 79 (2021).
