= Ibrıcak, Gerede =

Ibrıcak
- Village
- Location within Turkey
- Coordinates: 40.7919°N 32.1167°E
- Country: Turkey
- Province: Bolu
- District: Gerede
- Population (2021): 364
- Time zone: UTC+3 (TRT)

Ibrıcak is a village in the Gerede District, Bolu Province, Turkey. Its population is 364 (2021).
