= Afşartarakçı, Gerede =

Afşartarakçı
- Village
- Location within Turkey
- Coordinates: 40°49′N 32°19′E
- Country: Turkey
- Province: Bolu
- District: Gerede
- Population (2021): 53
- Time zone: UTC+3 (TRT)

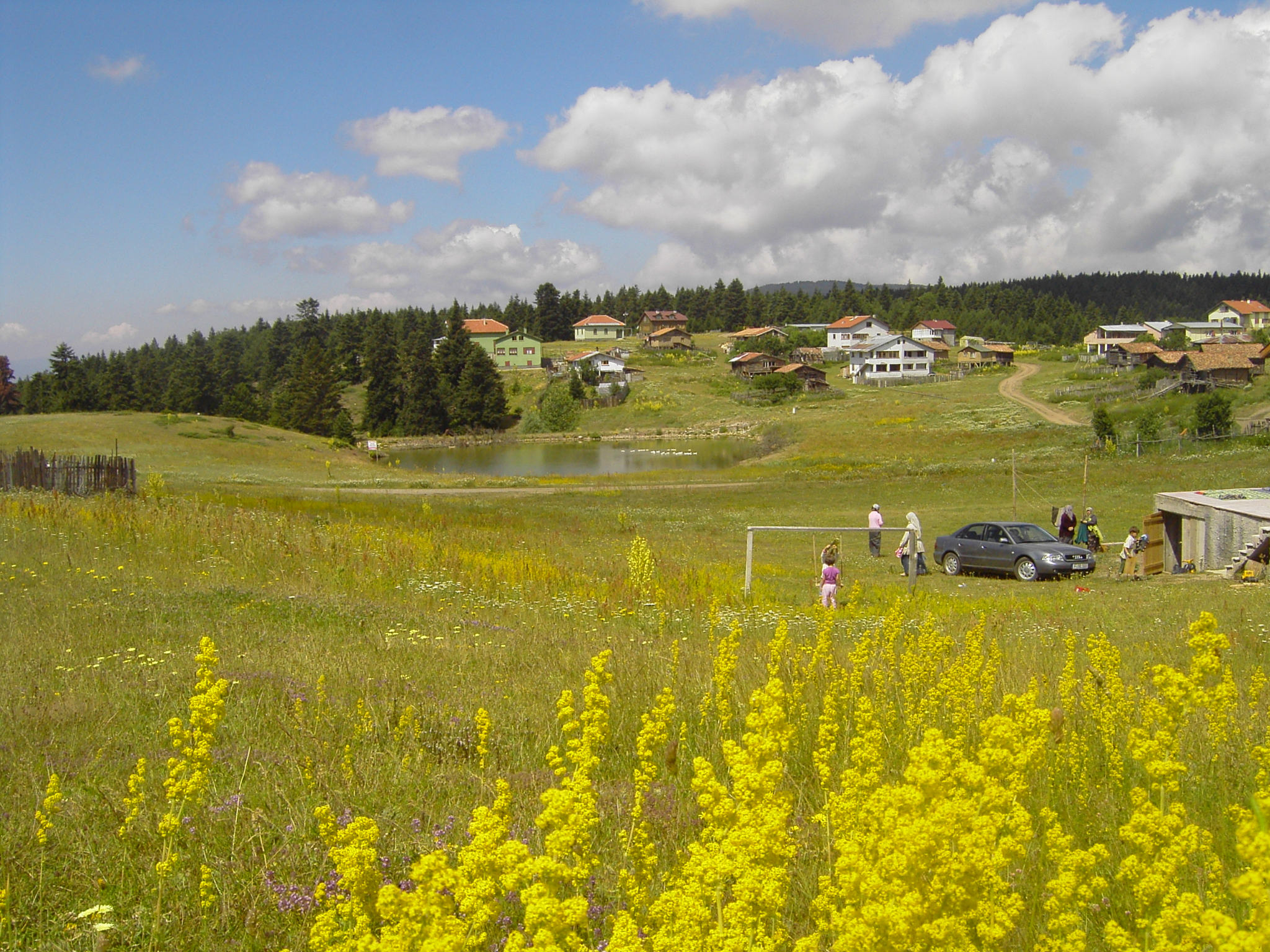
Afşartarakçı

Afşartarakçı is a village in the Gerede District, Bolu Province, Turkey. Its population is 53 (2021).
