= Çorakmıtırlar, Mengen =

Çorakmıtırlar
- Village
- Location within Turkey
- Coordinates: 40°52′N 31°57′E
- Country: Turkey
- Province: Bolu
- District: Mengen
- Population (2021): 91
- Time zone: UTC+3 (TRT)

Çorakmıtırlar is a village in the Mengen District, Bolu Province, Turkey. Its population is 91 (2021).
