= Çoğullu, Gerede =

Çoğullu
- Village
- Location within Turkey
- Coordinates: 40°44′N 32°12′E
- Country: Turkey
- Province: Bolu
- District: Gerede
- Population (2021): 147
- Time zone: UTC+3 (TRT)

Çoğullu is a village in the Gerede District, Bolu Province, Turkey. Its population is 147 (2021).
