= Kıyaslar, Mengen =

Kıyaslar
- Village
- Location within Turkey
- Coordinates: 40°58′N 32°04′E
- Country: Turkey
- Province: Bolu
- District: Mengen
- Population (2021): 160
- Time zone: UTC+3 (TRT)

Kıyaslar is a village in the Mengen District, Bolu Province, Turkey. Its population is 160 (2021).
