= Demircisopran, Gerede =

Demircisopran
- Village
- Location within Turkey
- Coordinates: 40°47′N 32°27′E
- Country: Turkey
- Province: Bolu
- District: Gerede
- Population (2021): 107
- Time zone: UTC+3 (TRT)

Demircisopran is a village in the Gerede District, Bolu Province, Turkey. Its population is 107 (2021).
