= Babahızır, Mengen =

Babahızır
- Village
- Location within Turkey
- Coordinates: 40°55′N 32°04′E
- Country: Turkey
- Province: Bolu
- District: Mengen
- Population (2021): 208
- Time zone: UTC+3 (TRT)

Babahızır is a village in the Mengen District, Bolu Province, Turkey. Its population is 208 (2021).
