= Sofular, Gerede =

Sofular
- Village
- Location within Turkey
- Coordinates: 40°45′40″N 32°11′37″E
- Country: Turkey
- Province: Bolu
- District: Gerede
- Population (2021): 175
- Time zone: UTC+3 (TRT)

Sofular is a village in the Gerede District, Bolu Province, Turkey. Its population is 175 (2021).
