= Başyellice, Mengen =

Başyellice
- Village
- Location within Turkey
- Coordinates: 41°00′N 31°59′E
- Country: Turkey
- Province: Bolu
- District: Mengen
- Population (2021): 162
- Time zone: UTC+3 (TRT)

Başyellice is a village in the Mengen District, Bolu Province, Turkey. Its population is 162 (2021).
