= Kayısopran, Gerede =

Kayısopran
- Village
- Location within Turkey
- Coordinates: 40°48′N 32°27′E
- Country: Turkey
- Province: Bolu
- District: Gerede
- Population (2021): 46
- Time zone: UTC+3 (TRT)

Kayısopran is a village in the Gerede District, Bolu Province, Turkey. Its population is 46 (2021).
