= Çağış, Gerede =

Çağış
- Village
- Location within Turkey
- Coordinates: 40.8125°N 32.4012°E
- Country: Turkey
- Province: Bolu
- District: Gerede
- Population (2021): 101
- Time zone: UTC+3 (TRT)

Çağış is a village in the Gerede District, Bolu Province, Turkey. Its population is 101 (2021).
