= Çorakkadirler, Mengen =

Çorakkadirler
- Village
- Location within Turkey
- Coordinates: 40°53′N 31°57′E
- Country: Turkey
- Province: Bolu
- District: Mengen
- Population (2021): 101
- Time zone: UTC+3 (TRT)

Çorakkadirler is a village in the Mengen District, Bolu Province, Turkey. Its population is 101 (2021).
