= Hayranlar, Mengen =

Hayranlar
- Village
- Location within Turkey
- Coordinates: 40.8852°N 31.8526°E
- Country: Turkey
- Province: Bolu
- District: Mengen
- Population (2021): 86
- Time zone: UTC+3 (TRT)

Hayranlar is a village in the Mengen District, Bolu Province, Turkey. Its population is 86 (2021).
