= Birinciafşar, Gerede =

Birinciafşar
- Village
- Location within Turkey
- Coordinates: 40.7425°N 32.2964°E
- Country: Turkey
- Province: Bolu
- District: Gerede
- Population (2021): 33
- Time zone: UTC+3 (TRT)

Birinciafşar is a village in the Gerede District, Bolu Province, Turkey. Its population is 33 (2021).
