= Ortaca, Gerede =

Ortaca
- Village
- Location within Turkey
- Coordinates: 40.7758°N 32.4321°E
- Country: Turkey
- Province: Bolu
- District: Gerede
- Population (2021): 159
- Time zone: UTC+3 (TRT)

Ortaca is a village in the Gerede District, Bolu Province, Turkey. Its population is 159 (2021).
