= Kazanlar, Gerede =

Kazanlar
- Village
- Location within Turkey
- Coordinates: 40°43′N 32°17′E
- Country: Turkey
- Province: Bolu
- District: Gerede
- Population (2021): 67
- Time zone: UTC+3 (TRT)

Kazanlar is a village in the Gerede District, Bolu Province, Turkey. Its population is 67 (2021).
