= Karaishak, Mengen =

Karaishak
- Village
- Location within Turkey
- Coordinates: 40°59′N 32°11′E
- Country: Turkey
- Province: Bolu
- District: Mengen
- Population (2021): 76
- Time zone: UTC+3 (TRT)

Karaishak is a village in the Mengen District, Bolu Province, Turkey. Its population is 76 (2021).
