= Mamatlar, Mengen =

Mamatlar
- Village
- Location within Turkey
- Coordinates: 40.8448°N 31.8765°E
- Country: Turkey
- Province: Bolu
- District: Mengen
- Population (2021): 118
- Time zone: UTC+3 (TRT)

Mamatlar is a village in the Mengen District, Bolu Province, Turkey. Its population is 118 (2021).
