= İkinciafşar, Gerede =

İkinciafşar
- Village
- Location within Turkey
- Country: Turkey
- Province: Bolu
- District: Gerede
- Population (2021): 56
- Time zone: UTC+3 (TRT)

İkinciafşar is a village in the Gerede District, Bolu Province, Turkey. Its population is 56 (2021).
