= Dağkara, Gerede =

Dağkara
- Village
- Location within Turkey
- Coordinates: 40°40′48″N 32°16′37″E
- Country: Turkey
- Province: Bolu
- District: Gerede
- Population (2021): 104
- Time zone: UTC+3 (TRT)

Dağkara is a village in the Gerede District, Bolu Province, Turkey. Its population is 104 (2021).
