= Karakaya, Mengen =

Karakaya
- Village
- Location within Turkey
- Coordinates: 40.9436°N 31.9610°E
- Country: Turkey
- Province: Bolu
- District: Mengen
- Population (2021): 51
- Time zone: UTC+3 (TRT)

Karakaya is a village in the Mengen District, Bolu Province, Turkey. Its population is 51 (2021).
