= Nuhören, Gerede =

Nuhören
- Village
- Location in Turkey
- Coordinates: 40.7675°N 32.1604°E
- Country: Turkey
- Province: Bolu
- District: Gerede
- Population (2021): 157
- Time zone: UTC+3 (TRT)

Nuhören is a village in the Gerede District, Bolu Province, Turkey. Its population is 157 (2021).
