= Yunuslar, Gerede =

Yunuslar
- Village
- Location within Turkey
- Coordinates: 40.811°N 32.332°E
- Country: Turkey
- Province: Bolu
- District: Gerede
- Population (2021): 138
- Time zone: UTC+3 (TRT)

Yunuslar is a village in the Gerede District, Bolu Province, Turkey. Its population is 138 (2021).
