= Kürkçüler, Gerede =

Kürkçüler
- Village
- Location within Turkey
- Coordinates: 40.7334°N 32.2133°E
- Country: Turkey
- Province: Bolu
- District: Gerede
- Population (2021): 146
- Time zone: UTC+3 (TRT)

Kürkçüler is a village in the Gerede District, Bolu Province, Turkey. Its population is 146 (2021).
