= Rüknettin, Mengen =

Rüknettin
- Village
- Location within Turkey
- Country: Turkey
- Province: Bolu
- District: Mengen
- Population (2021): 94
- Time zone: UTC+3 (TRT)

Rüknettin (also: Rüknettinköy) is a village in the Mengen District, Bolu Province, Turkey. Its population is 94 (2021).
