= Yazıköy, Gerede =

Yazıköy
- Village
- Location within Turkey
- Coordinates: 40.7618°N 32.2354°E
- Country: Turkey
- Province: Bolu
- District: Gerede
- Population (2021): 118
- Time zone: UTC+3 (TRT)

Yazıköy is a village in the Gerede District, Bolu Province, Turkey. Its population is 118 (2021).
