= Elemen, Mengen =

Elemen
- Village
- Location within Turkey
- Coordinates: 40.9024°N 31.9038°E
- Country: Turkey
- Province: Bolu
- District: Mengen
- Population (2021): 107
- Time zone: UTC+3 (TRT)

Elemen is a village in the Mengen District, Bolu Province, Turkey. Its population is 107 (2021).
