= Mukamlar, Gerede =

Mukamlar
- Village
- Location within Turkey
- Coordinates: 40°45′N 32°21′E
- Country: Turkey
- Province: Bolu
- District: Gerede
- Population (2021): 71
- Time zone: UTC+3 (TRT)

Mukamlar is a village in the Gerede District, Bolu Province, Turkey. Its population is 71 (2021).
