= Havullu, Gerede =

Havullu
- Village
- Location within Turkey
- Coordinates: 40°40′N 32°15′E
- Country: Turkey
- Province: Bolu
- District: Gerede
- Population (2021): 235
- Time zone: UTC+3 (TRT)

Havullu is a village in the Gerede District, Bolu Province, Turkey. Its population is 235 (2021).
