= Beşkonak, Gerede =

Beşkonak
- Village
- Location within Turkey
- Coordinates: 40.7723°N 32.3991°E
- Country: Turkey
- Province: Bolu
- District: Gerede
- Population (2021): 115
- Time zone: UTC+3 (TRT)

Beşkonak is a village in the Gerede District, Bolu Province, Turkey. Its population is 115 (2021).
