= Karacadağ, Gerede =

Karacadağ
- Village
- Location within Turkey
- Coordinates: 40.8264°N 32.4516°E
- Country: Turkey
- Province: Bolu
- District: Gerede
- Population (2021): 74
- Time zone: UTC+3 (TRT)

Karacadağ is a village in the Gerede District, Bolu Province, Turkey. Its population is 74 (2021).
