= Yellicedemirciler, Mengen =

Yellicedemirciler
- Village
- Location within Turkey
- Coordinates: 41°00′N 31°56′E
- Country: Turkey
- Province: Bolu
- District: Mengen
- Population (2021): 117
- Time zone: UTC+3 (TRT)

Yellicedemirciler is a village in the Mengen District, Bolu Province, Turkey. Its population is 117 (2021).
