= Halaçlar, Gerede =

Halaçlar
- Village
- Location within Turkey
- Coordinates: 40.7202°N 32.1472°E
- Country: Turkey
- Province: Bolu
- District: Gerede
- Population (2021): 115
- Time zone: UTC+3 (TRT)

Halaçlar is a village in the Gerede District, Bolu Province, Turkey. Its population is 115 (2021).
