= Mangallar, Gerede =

Mangallar
- Village
- Location within Turkey
- Coordinates: 40°46′N 32°15′E
- Country: Turkey
- Province: Bolu
- District: Gerede
- Population (2021): 125
- Time zone: UTC+3 (TRT)

Mangallar (also: Mankallar) is a village in the Gerede District, Bolu Province, Turkey. Its population is 125 (2021).
