= Tatlar, Gerede =

Tatlar
- Village
- Location within Turkey
- Coordinates: 40.6925°N 32.2567°E
- Country: Turkey
- Province: Bolu
- District: Gerede
- Population (2021): 78
- Time zone: UTC+3 (TRT)

Tatlar is a village in the Gerede District, Bolu Province, Turkey. Its population is 78 (2021).
