= Karapazar, Gerede =

Karapazar
- Village
- Location within Turkey
- Coordinates: 40.5884°N 32.2195°E
- Country: Turkey
- Province: Bolu
- District: Gerede
- Population (2021): 247
- Time zone: UTC+3 (TRT)

Karapazar is a village in the Gerede District, Bolu Province, Turkey. Its population is 247 (2021).
