= Süllertoklar, Gerede =

Süllertoklar
- Village
- Location within Turkey
- Coordinates: 40°45′N 32°14′E
- Country: Turkey
- Province: Bolu
- District: Gerede
- Population (2021): 90
- Time zone: UTC+3 (TRT)

Süllertoklar is a village in the Gerede District, Bolu Province, Turkey. Its population is 90 (2021).
