= Gözecik, Mengen =

Gözecik
- Village
- Location within Turkey
- Coordinates: 40.9220°N 32.2082°E
- Country: Turkey
- Province: Bolu
- District: Mengen
- Population (2022): 87
- Time zone: UTC+3 (TRT)

Gözecik is a village in the Mengen District, Bolu Province, Turkey. Its population is 87 (2022).

== History ==
The name of the village is mentioned as "Seyre" in the state records of 1928. Bolu Livası Yearbook covering the years 1227-1228 when examined, it is seen that Mengen district, to which Gözecik (Seyre) Village is connected today, was a township of Gerede District of Kastamonu Province at that time.

== Geography ==
It is 78 km from the city of Bolu and 18 km from the town of Mengen.

Gözecik village; The center consists of four neighborhoods, namely Ören, Esatlar and Bayrambeyler. The name Seyre was given from the word "Seyre" in the meaning of "watcher", influenced by its topography. It is located at an elevated position, plus the surrounding villages can be seen.

== Population ==
Historical population
Year	Pop.	±% p.a.
1985	122	—
1990	61	−12.94%
1997	56	−1.21%
2007	56	+0.00%
2012	65	+3.03%
2017	78	+3.71%
2022	87	+2.21%
Source: 1985 census, 1990 census, 1997 census and TÜIK (2007-2022)
