= Sipahiler, Gerede =

Sipahiler
- Village
- Location within Turkey
- Coordinates: 40.7354°N 32.2597°E
- Country: Turkey
- Province: Bolu
- District: Gerede
- Population (2021): 85
- Time zone: UTC+3 (TRT)

Sipahiler is a village in the Gerede District, Bolu Province, Turkey. Its population is 85 (2021).
