= Çayköy, Mengen =

Çayköy
- Village
- Country: Turkey
- Province: Bolu
- District: Mengen
- Population (2021): 144
- Time zone: UTC+3 (TRT)

Çayköy is a village in the Mengen District, Bolu Province, Turkey. Its population is 144 (2021).
