= Çayören, Gerede =

Çayören
- Village
- Location within Turkey
- Coordinates: 40.8065°N 32.2944°E
- Country: Turkey
- Province: Bolu
- District: Gerede
- Population (2021): 211
- Time zone: UTC+3 (TRT)

Çayören is a village in the Gerede District, Bolu Province, Turkey. Its population is 211 (2021).
