= Aktaşkurtlar, Gerede =

Aktaşkurtlar
- Village
- Location within Turkey
- Coordinates: 40°51′N 32°31′E
- Country: Turkey
- Province: Bolu
- District: Gerede
- Population (2021): 106
- Time zone: UTC+3 (TRT)

Aktaşkurtlar is a village in the Gerede District, Bolu Province, Turkey. Its population is 106 (2021).
