= Ulaşlar, Gerede =

Ulaşlar
- Village
- Location within Turkey
- Coordinates: 40.8123°N 32.3653°E
- Country: Turkey
- Province: Bolu
- District: Gerede
- Population (2021): 84
- Time zone: UTC+3 (TRT)

Ulaşlar is a village in the Gerede District, Bolu Province, Turkey. Its population is 84 (2021).
