= Mürdükler, Gerede =

Mürdükler
- Village
- Location within Turkey
- Coordinates: 40°43′0″N 32°16′35″E
- Country: Turkey
- Province: Bolu
- District: Gerede
- Population (2021): 52
- Time zone: UTC+3 (TRT)

Mürdükler is a village in the Gerede District, Bolu Province, Turkey. Its population is 52 (2021).
