= Dikmen, Gerede =

Dikmen
- Village
- Location within Turkey
- Coordinates: 40.7936°N 32.2742°E
- Country: Turkey
- Province: Bolu
- District: Gerede
- Population (2021): 90
- Time zone: UTC+3 (TRT)

Dikmen is a village in the Gerede District, Bolu Province, Turkey. Its population is 90 (2021).

== Geography ==
It is 55 km away from Bolu city center and 5 km away from Gerede district.
