= Ertuğrulköy, Gerede =

Ertuğrulköy
- Village
- Location within Turkey
- Coordinates: 40.7873°N 32.3841°E
- Country: Turkey
- Province: Bolu
- District: Gerede
- Population (2021): 101
- Time zone: UTC+3 (TRT)

Ertuğrulköy is a village in the Gerede District, Bolu Province, Turkey. Its population is 101 (2021).
