= Karacadağdemirciler =

- Village
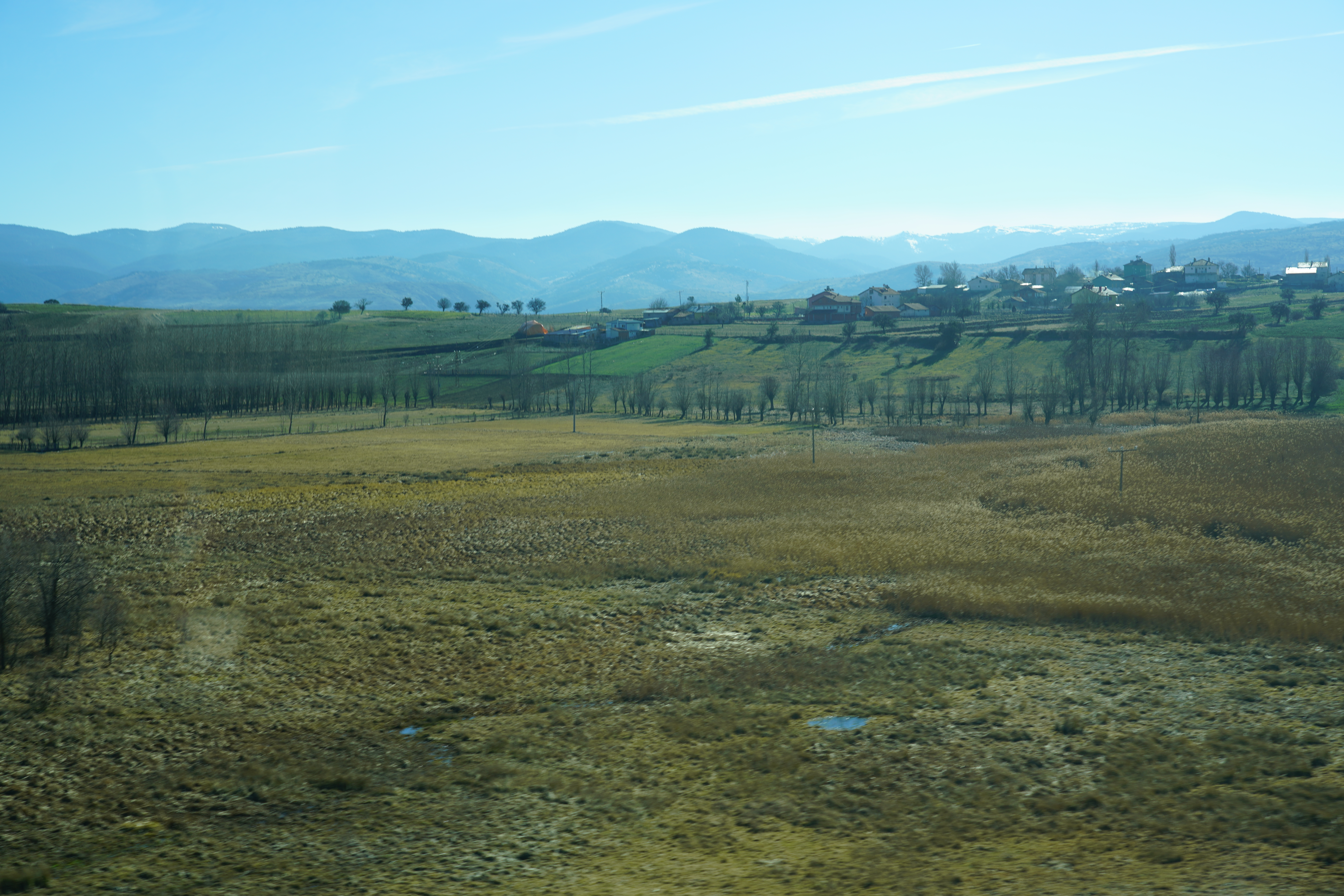

- Location within Turkey
- Coordinates: 40°50′N 32°27′E
- Country: Turkey
- Province: Bolu
- District: Gerede
- Population (2021): 113
- Time zone: UTC+3 (TRT)

Karacadağdemirciler is a village in the Gerede District, Bolu Province, Turkey. Its population is 113 (2021).
