= Salur, Gerede =

Salur
- Village
- Location within Turkey
- Coordinates: 40.6549°N 32.2271°E
- Country: Turkey
- Province: Bolu
- District: Gerede
- Population (2021): 281
- Time zone: UTC+3 (TRT)

Salur is a village in the Gerede District, Bolu Province, Turkey. Its population is 281 (2021).
