= Mengen District =

District of Bolu Province, Turkey

- District
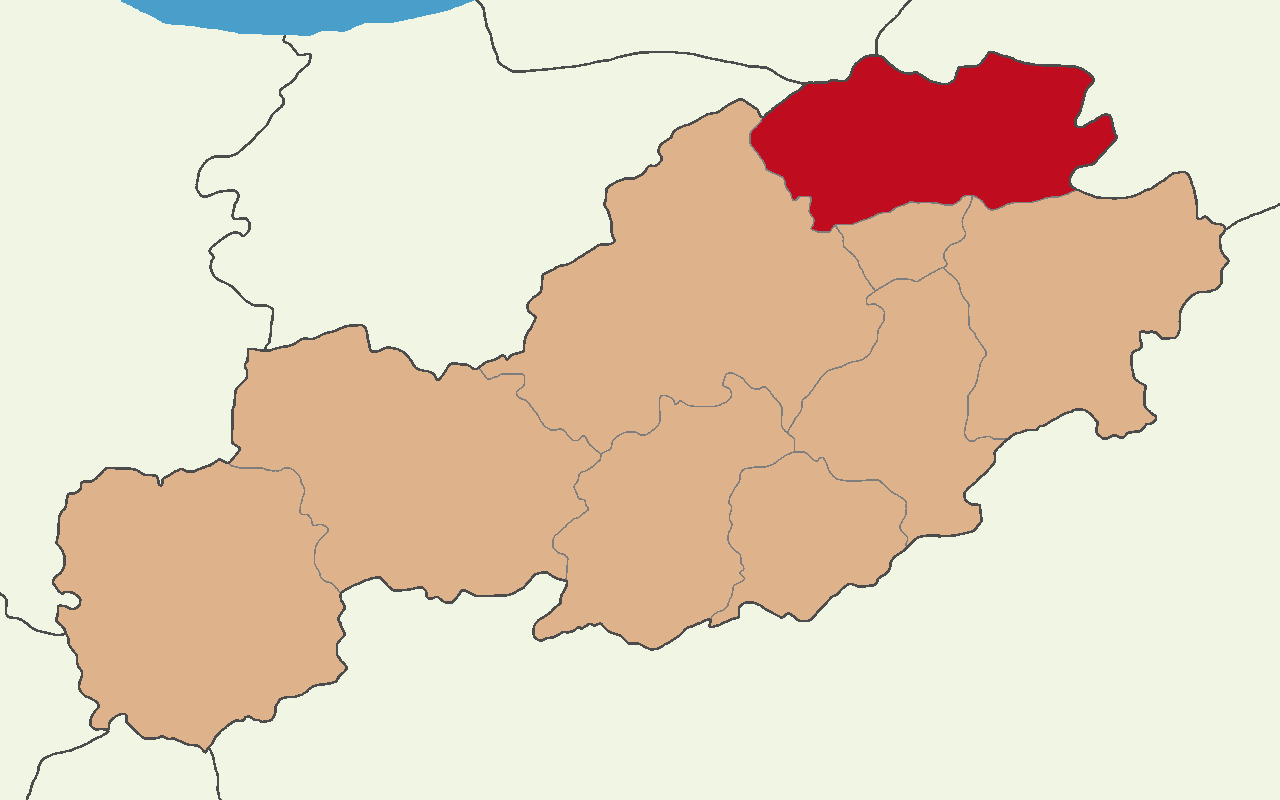
- Map showing Mengen District in Bolu Province

- Location in Turkey
- Coordinates: 40°56′N 32°04′E
- Country: Turkey
- Province: Bolu
- Seat: Mengen

Government
  - Kaymakam: Ekrem Ender Ergün
- Area: 874 km^{2} (337 sq mi)
- Population (2021): 13,679
  - Density: 15.7/km^{2} (40.5/sq mi)
- Time zone: UTC+3 (TRT)
- Website: www.mengen.gov.tr

Mengen District is a district of the Bolu Province of Turkey. Its seat is the town of Mengen. Its area is 874 km^{2}, and its population is 13,679 (2021).

== Composition ==
There are two municipalities in Mengen District:

- Gökçesu
- Mengen

There are 56 villages in Mengen District:

- Afşar
- Ağacalar
- Ağalar
- Akçakoca
- Akören
- Aktepe
- Alibeyler
- Arak
- Babahızır
- Banaz
- Başyellice
- Bölükören
- Bürnük
- Çayköy
- Çırdak
- Çorakkadirler
- Çorakmıtırlar
- Çubukköy
- Çukurca
- Demirciler
- Dereköy
- Düzağaç
- Düzköy
- Elemen
- Emirler
- Gözecik
- Güneygökçesu
- Hacıahmetler
- Hayranlar
- İlyaslar
- Kadılar
- Kadısusuz
- Karacalar
- Karaishak
- Karakaya
- Karaşeyhler
- Kavacık
- Kayabaşı
- Kayabükü
- Kayışlar
- Kıyaslar
- Konak
- Köprübaşı
- Küçükkuz
- Kuzgöl
- Mamatlar
- Nazırlar
- Pazarköy
- Rüknettin
- Şahbazlar
- Sarıkadılar
- Sazlar
- Teberikler
- Turna
- Yellicedemirciler
- Yumrutaş
