= Sazlar, Mengen =

Sazlar
- Village
- Location within Turkey
- Coordinates: 40.9370°N 32.1152°E
- Country: Turkey
- Province: Bolu
- District: Mengen
- Population (2021): 95
- Time zone: UTC+3 (TRT)

Sazlar is a village in the Mengen District, Bolu Province, Turkey. Its population is 95 (2021).
