= Karaşeyhler, Mengen =

Karaşeyhler
- Village
- Location within Turkey
- Coordinates: 40°56′N 32°17′E
- Country: Turkey
- Province: Bolu
- District: Mengen
- Population (2021): 165
- Time zone: UTC+3 (TRT)

Karaşeyhler is a village in the Mengen District, Bolu Province, Turkey. Its population is 165 (2021).
