= Zeyneller, Gerede =

Zeyneller
- Village
- Location within Turkey
- Coordinates: 40.744025°N 32.327725°E
- Country: Turkey
- Province: Bolu
- District: Gerede
- Population (2021): 62
- Time zone: UTC+3 (TRT)

Zeyneller is a village in the Gerede District, Bolu Province, Turkey. Its population is 62 (2021).
