= Elören, Gerede =

Elören
- Village
- Location within Turkey
- Coordinates: 40.8036°N 32.5245°E
- Country: Turkey
- Province: Bolu
- District: Gerede
- Population (2021): 56
- Time zone: UTC+3 (TRT)

Elören is a village in the Gerede District, Bolu Province, Turkey. Its population is 56 (2021).
