= Akören, Mengen =

Akören
- Village
- Location within Turkey
- Coordinates: 40.9719°N 32.0493°E
- Country: Turkey
- Province: Bolu
- District: Mengen
- Population (2021): 98
- Time zone: UTC+3 (TRT)

Akören is a village in the Mengen District, Bolu Province, Turkey. Its population is 98 (2021).
