= Koçumlar, Gerede =

Koçumlar
- Village
- Location within Turkey
- Coordinates: 40°49′N 32°15′E
- Country: Turkey
- Province: Bolu
- District: Gerede
- Population (2021): 200
- Time zone: UTC+3 (TRT)

Koçumlar is a village in the Gerede District, Bolu Province, Turkey. Its population is 200 (2021).
