= İmamlar, Gerede =

İmamlar
- Village
- Location within Turkey
- Coordinates: 40.8417°N 32.4828°E
- Country: Turkey
- Province: Bolu
- District: Gerede
- Population (2021): 67
- Time zone: UTC+3 (TRT)

İmamlar is a village in the Gerede District, Bolu Province, Turkey. Its population is 67 (2021).
