= Kadısusuz, Mengen =

Kadısusuz
- Village
- Location within Turkey
- Coordinates: 40°53′N 32°07′E
- Country: Turkey
- Province: Bolu
- District: Mengen
- Population (2021): 67
- Time zone: UTC+3 (TRT)

Kadısusuz is a village in the Mengen District, Bolu Province, Turkey. Its population is 67 (2021).
