= Çalışlar, Gerede =

Çalışlar
- Village
- Location within Turkey
- Coordinates: 40.7901°N 32.4060°E
- Country: Turkey
- Province: Bolu
- District: Gerede
- Population (2021): 78
- Time zone: UTC+3 (TRT)

Çalışlar is a village in the Gerede District, Bolu Province, Turkey. Its population is 78 (2021).
