= Bahçedere, Gerede =

Bahçedere
- Village
- Location within Turkey
- Coordinates: 40.7930°N 32.3188°E
- Country: Turkey
- Province: Bolu
- District: Gerede
- Population (2021): 94
- Time zone: UTC+3 (TRT)

Bahçedere is a village in the Gerede District, Bolu Province, Turkey. Its population is 94 (2021).
