= Kayabükü, Mengen =

Kayabükü
- Village
- Location within Turkey
- Coordinates: 40.9671°N 31.9149°E
- Country: Turkey
- Province: Bolu
- District: Mengen
- Population (2021): 31
- Time zone: UTC+3 (TRT)

Kayabükü is a village in the Mengen District, Bolu Province, Turkey. Its population is 31 (2021).
