= Aşağıovacık, Gerede =

Aşağıovacık
- Village
- Location in Turkey
- Coordinates: 40.5626°N 32.3831°E
- Country: Turkey
- Province: Bolu
- District: Gerede
- Population (2021): 73
- Time zone: UTC+3 (TRT)

Aşağıovacık is a village in the Gerede District, Bolu Province, Turkey. Its population is 73 (2021).
