= Örencik, Gerede =

Örencik
- Village
- Location within Turkey
- Coordinates: 40°48′24″N 32°23′17″E
- Country: Turkey
- Province: Bolu
- District: Gerede
- Population (2021): 83
- Time zone: UTC+3 (TRT)

Örencik is a village in the Gerede District, Bolu Province, Turkey. Its population is 83 (2021).
