= Çayörengüney, Gerede =

Çayörengüney
- Village
- Location within Turkey
- Coordinates: 40°48′N 32°16′E
- Country: Turkey
- Province: Bolu
- District: Gerede
- Population (2021): 129
- Time zone: UTC+3 (TRT)

Çayörengüney is a village in the Gerede District, Bolu Province, Turkey. Its population is 129 (2021).
