= Balcılar, Gerede =

Balcılar
- Village
- Location within Turkey
- Coordinates: 40.7317°N 32.2406°E
- Country: Turkey
- Province: Bolu
- District: Gerede
- Population (2021): 57
- Time zone: UTC+3 (TRT)

Balcılar is a village in the Gerede District, Bolu Province, Turkey. Its population is 57 (2021).
