= Aşağıörenbaşı, Gerede =

Aşağıörenbaşı
- Village
- Location in Turkey
- Coordinates: 40°48′30″N 32°28′55″E
- Country: Turkey
- Province: Bolu
- District: Gerede
- Population (2021): 58
- Time zone: UTC+3 (TRT)

Aşağıörenbaşı is a village in the Gerede District, Bolu Province, Turkey. Its population is 58 (2021).
