= Dereköy, Mengen =

Dereköy
- Village
- Location within Turkey
- Country: Turkey
- Province: Bolu
- District: Mengen
- Population (2021): 81
- Time zone: UTC+3 (TRT)

Dereköy is a village in the Mengen District, Bolu Province, Turkey. Its population is 81 (2021).
