= Köprübaşı, Mengen =

Köprübaşı
- Village
- Location within Turkey
- Coordinates: 40.9953°N 31.8938°E
- Country: Turkey
- Province: Bolu
- District: Mengen
- Population (2021): 227
- Time zone: UTC+3 (TRT)

Köprübaşı is a village in the Mengen District, Bolu Province, Turkey. Its population is 227 (2021).
