= Yakaboy, Gerede =

Yakaboy
- Village
- Location within Turkey
- Coordinates: 40.6816°N 32.2876°E
- Country: Turkey
- Province: Bolu
- District: Gerede
- Population (2021): 66
- Time zone: UTC+3 (TRT)

Yakaboy is a village in the Gerede District, Bolu Province, Turkey. Its population is 66 (2021).
