= Ağalar, Mengen =

Ağalar
- Village
- Location within Turkey
- Coordinates: 40.8987°N 32.0292°E
- Country: Turkey
- Province: Bolu
- District: Mengen
- Population (2021): 131
- Time zone: UTC+3 (TRT)

Ağalar is a village in the Mengen District, Bolu Province, Turkey. Its population is 131 (2021).
