= Aydınlar, Gerede =

Aydınlar
- Village
- Location within Turkey
- Coordinates: 40.7834°N 32.1537°E
- Country: Turkey
- Province: Bolu
- District: Gerede
- Population (2021): 87
- Time zone: UTC+3 (TRT)

Aydınlar is a village in the Gerede District, Bolu Province, Turkey. Its population is 87 (2021).
