= Ümitköy, Gerede =

Ümitköy
- Village
- Location within Turkey
- Country: Turkey
- Province: Bolu
- District: Gerede
- Population (2021): 88
- Time zone: UTC+3 (TRT)

Ümitköy (also: Ümit) is a village in the Gerede District, Bolu Province, Turkey. Its population is 88 (2021).
