= Yeşilvadi, Gerede =

Yeşilvadi
- Village
- Location within Turkey
- Coordinates: 40.7081°N 32.1480°E
- Country: Turkey
- Province: Bolu
- District: Gerede
- Population (2021): 162
- Time zone: UTC+3 (TRT)

Yeşilvadi is a village in the Gerede District, Bolu Province, Turkey. Its population is 162 (2021).
