= Düzağaç, Mengen =

Düzağaç
- Village
- Location within Turkey
- Coordinates: 40.9013°N 32.1868°E
- Country: Turkey
- Province: Bolu
- District: Mengen
- Population (2021): 185
- Time zone: UTC+3 (TRT)

Düzağaç is a village in the Mengen District, Bolu Province, Turkey. Its population is 185 (2021).
