= Düzköy, Mengen =

Düzköy
- Village
- Location within Turkey
- Coordinates: 40.9408°N 32.1503°E
- Country: Turkey
- Province: Bolu
- District: Mengen
- Population (2021): 64
- Time zone: UTC+3 (TRT)

Düzköy is a village in the Mengen District, Bolu Province, Turkey. Its population is 64 (2021).
