= Yağdaş, Gerede =

Yağdaş
- Village
- Location within Turkey
- Coordinates: 40°47′N 32°17′E
- Country: Turkey
- Province: Bolu
- District: Gerede
- Population (2021): 63
- Time zone: UTC+3 (TRT)

Yağdaş is a village in the Gerede District, Bolu Province, Turkey. Its population is 63 (2021).
