= Enseliler, Gerede =

Enseliler
- Village
- Location within Turkey
- Coordinates: 40°49′20″N 32°29′30″E
- Country: Turkey
- Province: Bolu
- District: Gerede
- Population (2021): 42
- Time zone: UTC+3 (TRT)

Enseliler is a village in the Gerede District, Bolu Province, Turkey. Its population is 42 (2021).
