= Yakakaya, Gerede =

Yakakaya
- Village
- Location within Turkey
- Coordinates: 40.7702°N 32.1149°E
- Country: Turkey
- Province: Bolu
- District: Gerede
- Population (2021): 125
- Time zone: UTC+3 (TRT)

Yakakaya is a village in the Gerede District, Bolu Province, Turkey. Its population is 125 (2021).
