= Davutbeyli, Gerede =

Davutbeyli
- Village
- Location within Turkey
- Coordinates: 40°49′N 32°30′E
- Country: Turkey
- Province: Bolu
- District: Gerede
- Population (2021): 49
- Time zone: UTC+3 (TRT)

Davutbeyli is a village in the Gerede District, Bolu Province, Turkey. Its population is 49 (2021).
