= Yenecik, Gerede =

Yenecik
- Village
- Location within Turkey
- Coordinates: 40.6978°N 32.2976°E
- Country: Turkey
- Province: Bolu
- District: Gerede
- Population (2021): 39
- Time zone: UTC+3 (TRT)

Yenecik is a village in the Gerede District, Bolu Province, Turkey. Its population is 39 (2021).
