= Demirciler, Mengen =

Demirciler
- Village
- Location within Turkey
- Country: Turkey
- Province: Bolu
- District: Mengen
- Population (2021): 145
- Time zone: UTC+3 (TRT)

Demirciler is a village in the Mengen District, Bolu Province, Turkey. Its population is 145 (2021).
