= Yelkenler, Gerede =

Yelkenler
- Village
- Location within Turkey
- Coordinates: 40°45′N 32°09′E
- Country: Turkey
- Province: Bolu
- District: Gerede
- Population (2021): 117
- Time zone: UTC+3 (TRT)

Yelkenler is a village in the Gerede District, Bolu Province, Turkey. Its population is 117 (2021).
