= Akçabey, Gerede =

Akçabey
- Village
- Location within Turkey
- Coordinates: 40.8181°N 32.3805°E
- Country: Turkey
- Province: Bolu
- District: Gerede
- Population (2021): 86
- Time zone: UTC+3 (TRT)

Akçabey is a village in the Gerede District, Bolu Province, Turkey. Its population is 86 (2021).
