= Afşar, Mengen =

Afşar
- Village
- Location within Turkey
- Coordinates: 40.8695°N 31.8361°E
- Country: Turkey
- Province: Bolu
- District: Mengen
- Population (2021): 142
- Time zone: UTC+3 (TRT)

Afşar is a village in the Mengen District, Bolu Province, Turkey. Its population is 142 (2021).
