= Akbaş, Gerede =

Akbaş
- Village
- Location within Turkey
- Coordinates: 40°45′42″N 32°19′44″E
- Country: Turkey
- Province: Bolu
- District: Gerede
- Population (2021): 80
- Time zone: UTC+3 (TRT)

Akbaş is a village in the Gerede District, Bolu Province, Turkey. Its population is 80 (2021).
