= Emirler, Mengen =

Emirler
- Village
- Location within Turkey
- Coordinates: 40.8640°N 31.9202°E
- Country: Turkey
- Province: Bolu
- District: Mengen
- Population (2021): 60
- Time zone: UTC+3 (TRT)

Emirler is a village in the Mengen District, Bolu Province, Turkey. Its population is 60 (2021).
