= Kadılar, Mengen =

Kadılar
- Village
- Location within Turkey
- Coordinates: 40.8636°N 31.8951°E
- Country: Turkey
- Province: Bolu
- District: Mengen
- Population (2021): 109
- Time zone: UTC+3 (TRT)

Kadılar is a village in the Mengen District, Bolu Province, Turkey. Its population is 109 (2021).
