= Çubukköy, Mengen =

Çubukköy
- Village
- Location within Turkey
- Coordinates: 40.9935°N 32.0807°E
- Country: Turkey
- Province: Bolu
- District: Mengen
- Population (2021): 202
- Time zone: UTC+3 (TRT)

Çubukköy (also: Çubuk) is a village in the Mengen District, Bolu Province, Turkey. Its population is 202 (2021).
