= Aktaş, Gerede =

Aktaş
- Village
- Location within Turkey
- Coordinates: 40.6822°N 32.3257°E
- Country: Turkey
- Province: Bolu
- District: Gerede
- Population (2021): 72
- Time zone: UTC+3 (TRT)

Aktaş is a village in the Gerede District, Bolu Province, Turkey. Its population is 72 (2021).
