= Ahmetler, Gerede =

Ahmetler
- Village
- Location within Turkey
- Coordinates: 40.7728°N 32.1412°E
- Country: Turkey
- Province: Bolu
- District: Gerede
- Population (2021): 164
- Time zone: UTC+3 (TRT)

Ahmetler is a village in the Gerede District, Bolu Province, Turkey. Its population is 164 (2021).
