= Kayabaşı, Mengen =

Kayabaşı
- Village
- Location within Turkey
- Coordinates: 40.8791°N 31.8643°E
- Country: Turkey
- Province: Bolu
- District: Mengen
- Population (2021): 79
- Time zone: UTC+3 (TRT)

Kayabaşı is a village in the Mengen District, Bolu Province, Turkey. Its population is 79 (2021).
