= Kavacık, Gerede =

Kavacık
- Village
- Location within Turkey
- Coordinates: 40.7220°N 32.4253°E
- Country: Turkey
- Province: Bolu
- District: Gerede
- Population (2021): 51
- Time zone: UTC+3 (TRT)

Kavacık is a village in the Gerede District, Bolu Province, Turkey. Its population is 51 (2021).
