= Yazıkara, Gerede =

Yazıkara
- Village
- Location within Turkey
- Coordinates: 40°45′N 32°12′E
- Country: Turkey
- Province: Bolu
- District: Gerede
- Population (2021): 174
- Time zone: UTC+3 (TRT)

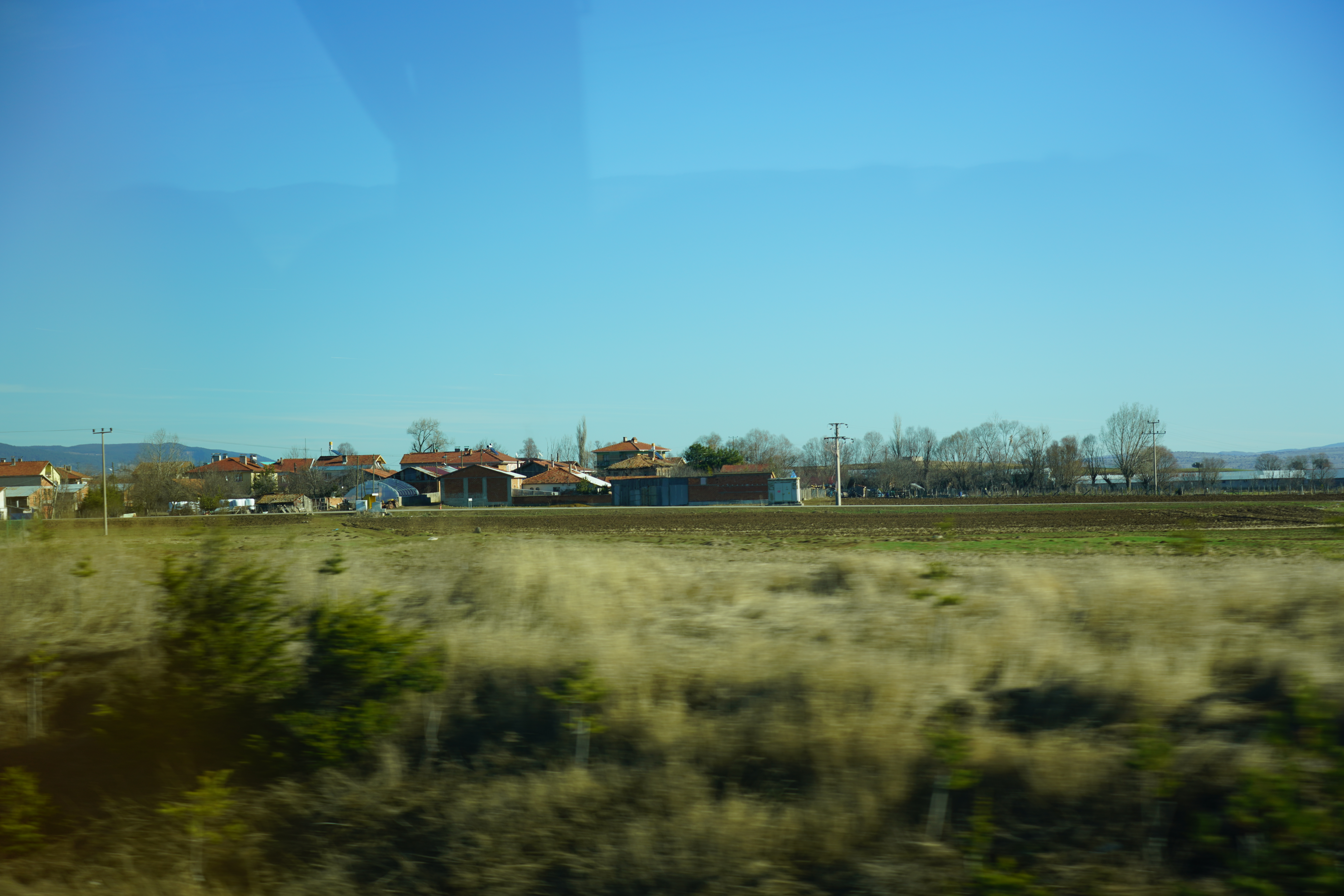

Yazıkara is a village in the Gerede District, Bolu Province, Turkey. Its population is 174 (2021).
