= Demirler, Gerede =

Demirler
- Village
- Location within Turkey
- Country: Turkey
- Province: Bolu
- District: Gerede
- Population (2021): 71
- Time zone: UTC+3 (TRT)

Demirler is a village in the Gerede District, Bolu Province, Turkey. Its population is 71 (2021).
