= Göynükören, Gerede =

Göynükören
- Village
- Location within Turkey
- Coordinates: 40.7502°N 32.1250°E
- Country: Turkey
- Province: Bolu
- District: Gerede
- Population (2021): 691
- Time zone: UTC+3 (TRT)

Göynükören is a village in the Gerede District, Bolu Province, Turkey. Its population is 691 (2021).
