= Ağacalar, Mengen =

Ağacalar
- Village
- Location within Turkey
- Coordinates: 40°54′N 32°02′E
- Country: Turkey
- Province: Bolu
- District: Mengen
- Population (2021): 66
- Time zone: UTC+3 (TRT)

Ağacalar is a village in the Mengen District, Bolu Province, Turkey. Its population is 66 (2021).
