= Mircekiraz, Gerede =

Mircekiraz
- Village
- Location within Turkey
- Coordinates: 40°42′N 32°14′E
- Country: Turkey
- Province: Bolu
- District: Gerede
- Population (2021): 93
- Time zone: UTC+3 (TRT)

Mircekiraz is a village in the Gerede District, Bolu Province, Turkey. Its population is 93 (2021). Mircekiraz is approximately 326 km from Istanbul.
