= Samat, Gerede =

Samat
- Village
- Location within Turkey
- Coordinates: 40.6888°N 32.2107°E
- Country: Turkey
- Province: Bolu
- District: Gerede
- Population (2021): 515
- Time zone: UTC+3 (TRT)

Samat is a village in the Gerede District, Bolu Province, Turkey. Its population is 515 (2021).
