= Sarıoğlu, Gerede =

Sarıoğlu
- Village
- Location within Turkey
- Coordinates: 40.8338°N 32.4892°E
- Country: Turkey
- Province: Bolu
- District: Gerede
- Population (2021): 47
- Time zone: UTC+3 (TRT)

Sarıoğlu is a village in the Gerede District, Bolu Province, Turkey. Its population is 47 (2021).
