= İnköy, Gerede =

İnköy
- Village
- Location within Turkey
- Coordinates: 40.7136°N 32.3157°E
- Country: Turkey
- Province: Bolu
- District: Gerede
- Population (2021): 82
- Time zone: UTC+3 (TRT)

İnköy is a village in the Gerede District, Bolu Province, Turkey. Its population is 82 (2021).
