= Oligosaprobe =

Water-borne organism

Oligosaprobes are organisms that inhabit clean water or water that is only slightly polluted by organic matter. Oxidation processes predominate in such waters owing to an excess of dissolved oxygen. Nitrates are among the nitrogen compounds present; there is little carbonic acid and no hydrogen sulfide. Oligosaprobic environments are aquatic environments rich in dissolved oxygen and (relatively) free from decayed organic matter.

== Overview ==
Oligosaprobes include some green and diatomaceous algae, flowering plants (for example, European white water lilies), some rotifers, Bryozoa, sponges, mollusks of the genus Dreissena, cladocerans (daphnids, bithotrephes), dragonfly and mayfly larvae, sterlets, trout, minnows, and newts.

Oligosaprobes also embrace a few saprophytes, including bacteria (scores and hundreds per 1 cu mm of water) and organisms that feed on bacteria. The term “oligosaprobe” is usually applied only to freshwater organisms.

== See also ==
- Oxygenation (environmental) – Low oxygen conditions or levels
