= Akçakoca, Mengen =

Akçakoca
- Village
- Location within Turkey
- Coordinates: 40.9232°N 32.2423°E
- Country: Turkey
- Province: Bolu
- District: Mengen
- Population (2021): 168
- Time zone: UTC+3 (TRT)

Akçakoca is a village in the Mengen District, Bolu Province, Turkey. Its population is 168 (2021).
