= Yukarıovacık, Gerede =

Yukarıovacık
- Village
- Location within Turkey
- Coordinates: 40.5771°N 32.4135°E
- Country: Turkey
- Province: Bolu
- District: Gerede
- Population (2021): 39
- Time zone: UTC+3 (TRT)

Yukarıovacık is a village in the Gerede District, Bolu Province, Turkey. Its population is 39 (2021).
