= Çukurca, Gerede =

Çukurca
- Village
- Location within Turkey
- Coordinates: 40.7666°N 32.3682°E
- Country: Turkey
- Province: Bolu
- District: Gerede
- Population (2021): 70
- Time zone: UTC+3 (TRT)

Çukurca is a village in the Gerede District, Bolu Province, Turkey. Its population is 70 (2021).
