= Akçaşehir, Gerede =

Akçaşehir
- Village
- Location within Turkey
- Coordinates: 40.8073°N 32.4234°E
- Country: Turkey
- Province: Bolu
- District: Gerede
- Population (2021): 66
- Time zone: UTC+3 (TRT)

Akçaşehir is a village in the Gerede District, Bolu Province, Turkey. Its population is 66 (2021).
