= Çukurca, Mengen =

Çukurca
- Village
- Location within Turkey
- Coordinates: 40.9170°N 32.0176°E
- Country: Turkey
- Province: Bolu
- District: Mengen
- Population (2021): 78
- Time zone: UTC+3 (TRT)

Çukurca is a village in the Mengen District, Bolu Province, Turkey. Its population is 78 (2021).
