= Akçakoca gas field =

Black Sea natural gas field

Akçakoca
- Country: Turkey
- Region: Black Sea
- Offshore/onshore: offshore
- Operator: Türkiye Petrolleri Anonim Ortaklığı, Petrol Ofisi, Tiway Oil, Stratic Oil

Field history
- Discovery: 2004
- Start of development: 2004
- Start of production: 2007

Production
- Current production of gas: 1.4×10^{6} m^{3}/d 50×10^{6} cu ft/d 0.5×10^{9} m^{3}/a (18×10^{9} cu ft/a)
- Estimated gas in place: 3.6×10^{9} m^{3} 127×10^{9} cu ft

The Akçakoca gas field is a natural gas field located on the continental shelf of the Black Sea. It was discovered in 2004 and developed by a consortium consisting of Türkiye Petrolleri Anonim Ortaklığı, Petrol Ofisi, Tiway Oil and Stratic Oil. It began production in 2007 and produces natural gas and condensates. The total proven reserves of the Akçakoca gas field are around 127 billion cubic feet (3.6 billion m^{3}), and production is slated to be around 50 million cubic feet/day (1.4 million m^{3}) in 2015.
