= Mengen, Bolu =

Mengen
- Municipality
- Location within Turkey
- Coordinates: 40°56′19″N 32°04′27″E
- Country: Turkey
- Province: Bolu
- District: Mengen

Government
  - Mayor: Turhan Bulut (CHP)
- Population (2021): 5,585
- Time zone: UTC+3 (TRT)
- Climate: Cfb
- Website: mengen.bel.tr

Mengen is a rural town in Bolu Province in the Black Sea region of western Turkey, 58 km (36 mi) from the provincial center city of Bolu. It is the seat of Mengen District. Its population is 5,585 (2021). The mayor is Turhan Bulut (CHP). Mengen is 180 km (110 mi) from Ankara.

== External links and references ==
- (in Turkish)
- (in Turkish)
