= List of populated places in Kastamonu Province =

List of places in Turkey

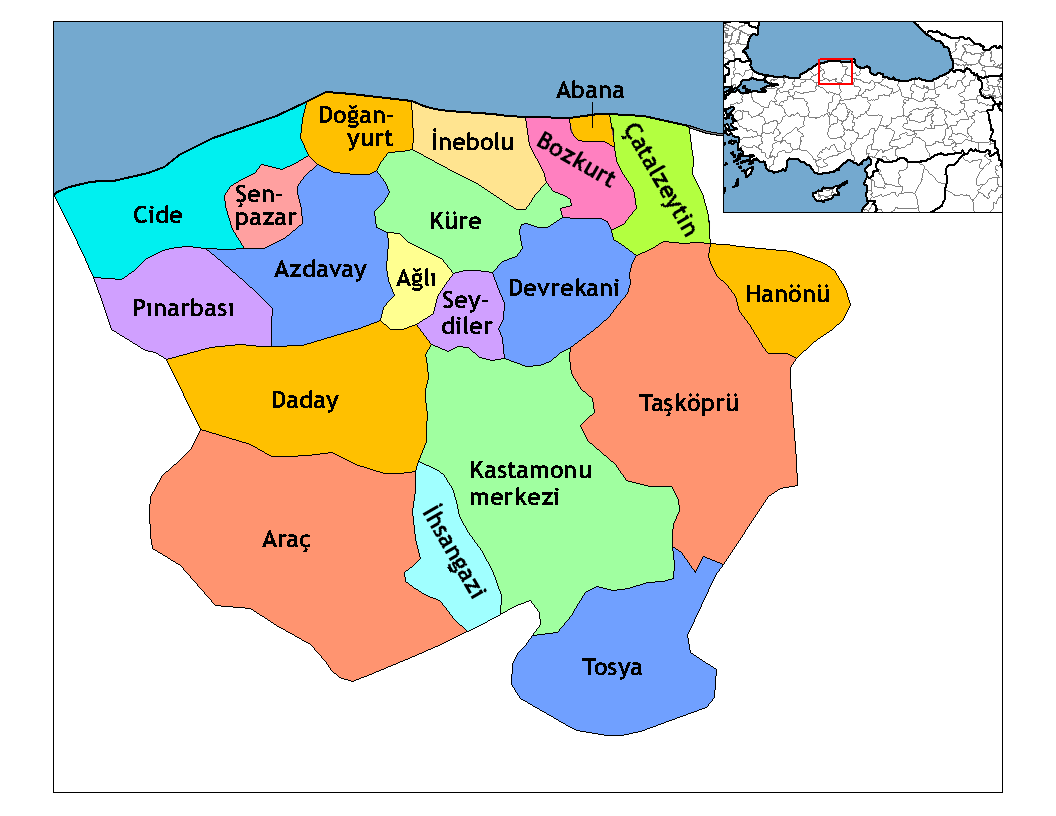
Kastamonu Province

Below is the list of populated places in Kastamonu Province, Turkey by the districts. In the following lists first place in each list is the administrative center of the district.

== Kastamonu ==
- Kastamonu
- Ahlat, Kastamonu
- Ahlatçık, Kastamonu
- Ahmetbey, Kastamonu
- Akçakese, Kastamonu
- Akçataş, Kastamonu
- Akdoğan, Kastamonu
- Aksinir, Kastamonu
- Alçucular, Kastamonu
- Alpağut, Kastamonu
- Alparslan, Kastamonu
- Alpı, Kastamonu
- Arız, Kastamonu
- Aşağıakça, Kastamonu
- Aşağıbatak, Kastamonu
- Aşağıelyakut, Kastamonu
- Aşağıyuva, Kastamonu
- Ayvalar, Kastamonu
- Bahadır, Kastamonu
- Ballık, Kastamonu
- Baltacı, Kastamonu
- Baltacıkuyucağı, Kastamonu
- Başköy, Kastamonu
- Başören, Kastamonu
- Bayındır, Kastamonu
- Bostan, Kastamonu
- Bozoğlak, Kastamonu
- Budamış, Kastamonu
- Bulacık, Kastamonu
- Burhanlı, Kastamonu
- Bük, Kastamonu
- Bürme, Kastamonu
- Canbaz, Kastamonu
- Çavundur, Kastamonu
- Çavundur-Kuzkaya, Kastamonu
- Cebeci, Kastamonu
- Civciler, Kastamonu
- Çakıllı, Kastamonu
- Çatalçam, Kastamonu
- Çatören, Kastamonu
- Çerçi, Kastamonu
- Çevreli, Kastamonu
- Çıban, Kastamonu
- Çiğil, Kastamonu
- Çorumlu, Kastamonu
- Damlaçay, Kastamonu
- Darıbükü, Kastamonu
- Dayılar, Kastamonu
- Demirci, Kastamonu
- Dere, Kastamonu
- Dereberçin, Kastamonu
- Dokuzkat, Kastamonu
- Dursunlar, Kastamonu
- Duruçay, Kastamonu
- Eceoğlu, Kastamonu
- Elmayakası, Kastamonu
- Emir, Kastamonu
- Emirler, Kastamonu
- Emirle-Kuzkaya, Kastamonu
- Emirli, Kastamonu
- Esenler, Kastamonu
- Esenli, Kastamonu
- Eşen, Kastamonu
- Etyemez, Kastamonu
- Evciler, Kastamonu
- Eymir, Kastamonu
- Gelinören, Kastamonu
- Geyikli, Kastamonu
- Girdallı, Kastamonu
- Göcen, Kastamonu
- Gödel, Kastamonu
- Gökçekent, Kastamonu
- Gökçukur, Kastamonu
- Gölköy, Kastamonu
- Gömeç, Kastamonu
- Gömmece, Kastamonu
- Gülef, Kastamonu
- Hacı, Kastamonu
- Hacıbey, Kastamonu
- Hacıilyas, Kastamonu
- Hacımuharrem, Kastamonu
- Hacışaban, Kastamonu
- Hacıyusuf, Kastamonu
- Halaçlı, Kastamonu
- Halife, Kastamonu
- Halifekuyucağı, Kastamonu
- Hamit, Kastamonu
- Has, Kastamonu
- Hatıp, Kastamonu
- Hatipli, Kastamonu
- Hatipoğlu, Kastamonu
- Haydarlar, Kastamonu
- Hoca, Kastamonu
- Hüseyinli, Kastamonu
- İbişler, Kastamonu
- İbrahimli, Kastamonu
- İmamköy, Kastamonu
- İnceboğaz, Kastamonu
- İslam, Kastamonu
- İsmailli-Akkaya, Kastamonu
- İsmailli-Kuzkaya, Kastamonu
- Kadıoğlu, Kastamonu
- Karaçomak, Kastamonu
- Karaevli, Kastamonu
- Karakuz, Kastamonu
- Karamukmolla, Kastamonu
- Karaş, Kastamonu
- Kasaba, Kastamonu
- Kasabaörencik, Kastamonu
- Kaşçılar, Kastamonu
- Kavak, Kastamonu
- Kavalca, Kastamonu
- Kayalı, Kastamonu
- Kayı, Kastamonu
- Kemerler, Kastamonu
- Keremli, Kastamonu
- Kırcalar, Kastamonu
- Kırık, Kastamonu
- Kırışoğlu, Kastamonu
- Kızılkese, Kastamonu
- Kirenli, Kastamonu
- Konukça, Kastamonu
- Koru, Kastamonu
- Köklü, Kastamonu
- Köseoğlu, Kastamonu
- Kurtgömeç, Kastamonu
- Kurtkayı, Kastamonu
- Kurucaören, Kastamonu
- Kurusaray, Kastamonu
- Kuşkara, Kastamonu
- Kuzyaka, Kastamonu
- Kıyık (Kuzkaya), Kastamonu
- Küçüksu, Kastamonu
- Kıyık, Kastamonu
- Kıyık-Kuzkaya, Kastamonu
- Mescit, Kastamonu
- Molla, Kastamonu
- Musallar, Kastamonu
- Nalcıkuyucağı, Kastamonu
- Numanlar, Kastamonu
- Obruk, Kastamonu
- Oğul, Kastamonu
- Omcular, Kastamonu
- Orta, Kastamonu
- Ortaboğaz, Kastamonu
- Ömerli, Kastamonu
- Örencik, Kastamonu
- Örenyeri, Kastamonu
- Pehlivan, Kastamonu
- Sada, Kastamonu
- Sahip, Kastamonu
- Sapaca, Kastamonu
- Saraycık, Kastamonu
- Sarıca, Kastamonu
- Sarıömer, Kastamonu
- Seremittin, Kastamonu
- Sırasöğütler, Kastamonu
- Sipahi, Kastamonu
- Subaşı, Kastamonu
- Sulusökü, Kastamonu
- Şeyh, Kastamonu
- Talipler, Kastamonu
- Tarlatepe, Kastamonu
- Taşlık, Kastamonu
- Tekke, Kastamonu
- Tepeharman, Kastamonu
- Terzi, Kastamonu
- Uzunoluk, Kastamonu
- Ümit, Kastamonu
- Üyücek, Kastamonu
- Yaka, Kastamonu
- Yarören, Kastamonu
- Yenikavak, Kastamonu
- Yılancı, Kastamonu
- Yolkonak, Kastamonu
- Yukarıbatak, Kastamonu
- Yukarıelyakut, Kastamonu
- Yukarıkuyucak, Kastamonu
- Yunus, Kastamonu
- Yürekveren, Kastamonu

== Abana ==
- Abana
- Akçam, Abana
- Altıkulaç, Abana
- Çampınar, Abana
- Denizbükü, Abana
- Elmaçukuru, Abana
- Göynükler, Abana
- Kadıyusuf, Abana
- Yakabaşı, Abana
- Yemeni, Abana
- Yeşilyuva, Abana

== Ağlı ==
- Ağlı
- Adalar, Ağlı
- Akçakese, Ağlı
- Akdivan, Ağlı
- Bereketli, Ağlı
- Fırıncık, Ağlı
- Gölcüğez, Ağlı
- Kabacı, Ağlı
- Müsellimler, Ağlı
- Oluközü, Ağlı
- Selmanlı, Ağlı
- Tunuslar, Ağlı
- Turnacık, Ağlı
- Yeşilpınar, Ağlı

== Araç ==
- Araç
- Ahatlar, Araç
- Akgeçit, Araç
- Akıncılar, Araç
- Aksu, Araç
- Aktaş, Araç
- Alakaya, Araç
- Alınören, Araç
- Aşağıçobanözü, Araç
- Aşağıılıpınar, Araç
- Aşağıikizören, Araç
- Aşağıoba, Araç
- Aşağıyazı, Araç
- Avlacık, Araç
- Avlağıçayırı, Araç
- Bahçecik, Araç
- Balçıkhisar, Araç
- Başköy, Araç
- Bektüre, Araç
- Belen, Araç
- Belkavak, Araç
- Buğdam, Araç
- Celepler, Araç
- Cevizlik, Araç
- Çalköy, Araç
- Çamaltı, Araç
- Çavuşköy, Araç
- Çaykaşı, Araç
- Çerçiler, Araç
- Çubukludere, Araç
- Çukurpelit, Araç
- Damla, Araç
- Değirmençay, Araç
- Dereçatı, Araç
- Deretepe, Araç
- Doğanca, Araç
- Doğanpınar, Araç
- Doruk, Araç
- Ekinözü, Araç
- Erekli, Araç
- Eskiiğdir, Araç
- Fındıklı, Araç
- Gemi, Araç
- Gergen, Araç
- Gökçeçat, Araç
- Gökçesu, Araç
- Gölcük, Araç
- Gülükler, Araç
- Güzelce, Araç
- Güzlük, Araç
- Haliloba, Araç
- Hanözü, Araç
- Hatip, Araç
- Huruçören, Araç
- İğdir, Araç
- İğdirkışla, Araç
- İhsanlı, Araç
- Karacık, Araç
- Karaçalar, Araç
- Karakaya, Araç
- Karcılar, Araç
- Kavacık, Araç
- Kavak, Araç
- Kayabaşı, Araç
- Kayaboğazı, Araç
- Kayaören, Araç
- Kemerler, Araç
- Kışlaköy, Araç
- Kıyan, Araç
- Kıyıdibi, Araç
- Kızılören, Araç
- Kızılsaray, Araç
- Kirazlı, Araç
- Kovanlı, Araç
- Köklüdere, Araç
- Köklüyurt, Araç
- Köse, Araç
- Muratlı, Araç
- Müslimler, Araç
- Okçular, Araç
- Okluk, Araç
- Oycalı, Araç
- Ömersin, Araç
- Özbel, Araç
- Palazlar, Araç
- Pelitören, Araç
- Pınarören, Araç
- Recepbey, Araç
- Saltuklu, Araç
- Samatlar, Araç
- Sarıhacı, Araç
- Sarpun, Araç
- Serdar, Araç
- Sıragömü, Araç
- Sofcular, Araç
- Susuz, Araç
- Sümenler, Araç
- Şehrimanlar, Araç
- Şenyurt, Araç
- Şiringüney, Araç
- Taşpınar, Araç
- Tatlıca, Araç
- Tavşanlı, Araç
- Tellikoz, Araç
- Terke, Araç
- Tokatlı, Araç
- Toygaören, Araç
- Tuzaklı, Araç
- Uğur, Araç
- Ulucak, Araç
- Üçpınar, Araç
- Yenice, Araç
- Yeşilova, Araç
- Yukarıçobanözü, Araç
- Yukarıgüney, Araç
- Yukarıılıpınar, Araç
- Yukarıikizören, Araç
- Yukarıoba, Araç
- Yukarıyazı, Araç
- Yurttepe, Araç

== Azdavay ==
- Azdavay
- Ahat, Azdavay
- Akcaçam, Azdavay
- Alacık, Azdavay
- Aliköy, Azdavay
- Arslanca, Azdavay
- Bakırcı, Azdavay
- Başakçay, Azdavay
- Başören, Azdavay
- Çakıroğlu, Azdavay
- Çamlıbük, Azdavay
- Çoçukören, Azdavay
- Çömlektepe, Azdavay
- Derelitekke, Azdavay
- Dereyücek, Azdavay
- Evlek, Azdavay
- Gecen, Azdavay
- Göktaş, Azdavay
- Gültepe, Azdavay
- Gümürtler, Azdavay
- Hıdırlar, Azdavay
- Hocaköy, Azdavay
- Kanlıdağ, Azdavay
- Karahalılılar, Azdavay
- Karakuşlu, Azdavay
- Kayabaşı, Azdavay
- Kayaoğlu, Azdavay
- Kerpiçlik, Azdavay
- Kırcalar, Azdavay
- Kırmacı, Azdavay
- Kolca, Azdavay
- Kozluören, Azdavay
- Kurtçular, Azdavay
- Maden, Azdavay
- Maksutköy, Azdavay
- Mehmetçelebi, Azdavay
- Sabuncular, Azdavay
- Sada, Azdavay
- Samancı, Azdavay
- Sarayköy, Azdavay
- Sarnıçköy, Azdavay
- Sıraköy, Azdavay
- Söğütpınar, Azdavay
- Tasköy, Azdavay
- Tomrukköy, Azdavay
- Topuk, Azdavay
- Üyük, Azdavay
- Yeşilköy, Azdavay
- Yumacık, Azdavay
- Zümrüt, Azdavay

== Bozkurt ==
- Bozkurt
- Alantepe, Bozkurt
- Ambarcılar, Bozkurt
- Bayramgazi, Bozkurt
- Beldeğirmen, Bozkurt
- Çiçekyayla, Bozkurt
- Darsu, Bozkurt
- Dursun, Bozkurt
- Görentaş, Bozkurt
- Güngören, Bozkurt
- Günvaktı, Bozkurt
- Işığan, Bozkurt
- İbrahim, Bozkurt
- İlişi, Bozkurt
- İnceyazı, Bozkurt
- Kayalar, Bozkurt
- Kestanesökü, Bozkurt
- Keşlik, Bozkurt
- Kızılcaelma, Bozkurt
- Kirazsökü, Bozkurt
- Kocaçam, Bozkurt
- Koşmapınar, Bozkurt
- Köseali, Bozkurt
- Kutluca, Bozkurt
- Mamatlar, Bozkurt
- Ortasökü, Bozkurt
- Sakızcılar, Bozkurt
- Sarıçiçek, Bozkurt
- Şeyhoğlu, Bozkurt
- Tezcan, Bozkurt
- Ulu, Bozkurt
- Yaşarlı, Bozkurt
- Yaylatepe, Bozkurt

== Cide ==
- Cide
- Abdulkadir, Cide
- Ağaçbükü, Cide
- Akbayır, Cide
- Akça, Cide
- Alayazı, Cide
- Alayüz, Cide
- Aydıncık, Cide
- Baltacı, Cide
- Başköy, Cide
- Beltepe, Cide
- Beşevler, Cide
- Çakırlı, Cide
- Çamaltı, Cide
- Çamdibi, Cide
- Çataloluk, Cide
- Çayüstü, Cide
- Çayyaka, Cide
- Çilekçe, Cide
- Çukurçal, Cide
- Denizkonak, Cide
- Derebağ, Cide
- Derebucağı, Cide
- Doğankaya, Cide
- Döngelce, Cide
- Düzköy, Cide
- Emirler, Cide
- Gebeş, Cide
- Gökçeler, Cide
- Gökçeören, Cide
- Gündoğan, Cide
- Günebakan, Cide
- Güzelyayla, Cide
- Hacıahmet, Cide
- Hamitli, Cide
- Himmetbeşe, Cide
- İlyasbey, Cide
- Irmakköy, Cide
- İsaköy, Cide
- İshakça, Cide
- Kalafat, Cide
- Kapısuyu, Cide
- Karakadı, Cide
- Kasımköy, Cide
- Kayaardı, Cide
- Kazanlı, Cide
- Kethüda, Cide
- Kezağzı, Cide
- Kıranlıkoz, Cide
- Koçlar, Cide
- Konuklar, Cide
- Kovanören, Cide
- Köseli, Cide
- Kumköy, Cide
- Kuşçu, Cide
- Kuşkayası, Cide
- Mencekli, Cide
- Menük, Cide
- Musaköy, Cide
- Nanepınarı, Cide
- Okçular, Cide
- Olucak, Cide
- Ortaca, Cide
- Ovacık, Cide
- Öveçler, Cide
- Pehlivanlı, Cide
- Sakallı, Cide
- Sırakaya, Cide
- Sipahi, Cide
- Sofular, Cide
- Soğucak, Cide
- Şenköy, Cide
- Tarakçı, Cide
- Toygarlı, Cide
- Uğurlu, Cide
- Üçağıl, Cide
- Velioğlu, Cide
- Yalçınköy, Cide
- Yaylaköy, Cide
- Yenice, Cide
- Yeniköy, Cide
- Yıldızalan, Cide
- Yurtbaşı, Cide

== Çatalzeytin ==
- Çatalzeytin
- Arıca, Çatalzeytin
- Aşağısökü, Çatalzeytin
- Canlar, Çatalzeytin
- Celallar, Çatalzeytin
- Çağlar, Çatalzeytin
- Çatak, Çatalzeytin
- Çepni, Çatalzeytin
- Çubuklu, Çatalzeytin
- Dağköy, Çatalzeytin
- Doğan, Çatalzeytin
- Duran, Çatalzeytin
- Epçeler, Çatalzeytin
- Fındıklı, Çatalzeytin
- Güneşler, Çatalzeytin
- Hacıreis, Çatalzeytin
- Hacıreissökü, Çatalzeytin
- Hamidiye, Çatalzeytin
- İsmail, Çatalzeytin
- Karacakaya, Çatalzeytin
- Kaşlıca, Çatalzeytin
- Kavaklı, Çatalzeytin
- Kavakören, Çatalzeytin
- Kayadibi, Çatalzeytin
- Kaymazlar, Çatalzeytin
- Kızılcakaya, Çatalzeytin
- Kirazlı, Çatalzeytin
- Konaklı, Çatalzeytin
- Köklüce, Çatalzeytin
- Kuğu, Çatalzeytin
- Kulfallar, Çatalzeytin
- Kuzsökü, Çatalzeytin
- Paşalı, Çatalzeytin
- Piri, Çatalzeytin
- Samancı, Çatalzeytin
- Saraçlar, Çatalzeytin
- Sırakonak, Çatalzeytin
- Sökü, Çatalzeytin
- Yemişli, Çatalzeytin
- Yenibeyler, Çatalzeytin
- Yukarısökü, Çatalzeytin
- Yunuslar, Çatalzeytin

== Daday ==
- Daday
- Akılçalman, Daday
- Akpınar, Daday
- Aktaştekke, Daday
- Alipaşa, Daday
- Arabacılar, Daday
- Bağışlar, Daday
- Bastak, Daday
- Bayırköy, Daday
- Bayramlı, Daday
- Beykoz, Daday
- Bezirgan, Daday
- Bolatlar, Daday
- Boyalıca, Daday
- Boyalılar, Daday
- Budaklı, Daday
- Çamkonak, Daday
- Çamlıbel, Daday
- Çavuşlu, Daday
- Çayırlı, Daday
- Çayözü, Daday
- Çölmekçiler, Daday
- Davutköy, Daday
- Değirmencik, Daday
- Değirmenözü, Daday
- Demirce, Daday
- Dereköy, Daday
- Dereözü, Daday
- Elmayazı, Daday
- Ertaş, Daday
- Fasıllar, Daday
- Gökören, Daday
- Görük, Daday
- Hasanağa, Daday
- Hasanşeyh, Daday
- İnciğez, Daday
- Kapaklı, Daday
- Karaağaç, Daday
- Karacaağaç, Daday
- Karacaören, Daday
- Karamık, Daday
- Kavakyayla, Daday
- Kayabağı, Daday
- Kayı, Daday
- Kızılörencik, Daday
- Kızsini, Daday
- Koççuğaz, Daday
- Köşeler, Daday
- Küten, Daday
- Okluk, Daday
- Örencik, Daday
- Sarıçam, Daday
- Sarpun, Daday
- Selalmaz, Daday
- Siyahlar, Daday
- Sorkun, Daday
- Sorkuncuk, Daday
- Tüfekçi, Daday
- Uzbanlar, Daday
- Üyükören, Daday
- Yazıcameydan, Daday

== Devrekani ==
- Devrekani
- Ahlatçık, Devrekani
- Akçapınar, Devrekani
- Akdoğan, Devrekani
- Akmescit, Devrekani
- Alaçay, Devrekani
- Alçılar, Devrekani
- Alınören, Devrekani
- Arslanbey, Devrekani
- Asarcık, Devrekani
- Balabanlar, Devrekani
- Baltacak, Devrekani
- Başakpınar, Devrekani
- Başakpınartepe, Devrekani
- Belovacık, Devrekani
- Bıngıldayık, Devrekani
- Bozarmut, Devrekani
- Bozkoca, Devrekani
- Bozkocatepe, Devrekani
- Çatak, Devrekani
- Çavuşlu, Devrekani
- Çontay, Devrekani
- Çorbacı, Devrekani
- Çörekçi, Devrekani
- Doğuörcünler, Devrekani
- Elmalıtekke, Devrekani
- Erenler, Devrekani
- Fakılar, Devrekani
- Göynükören, Devrekani
- Habeşli, Devrekani
- Hasırlı, Devrekani
- İnciğez, Devrekani
- Kadıoğlu, Devrekani
- Kanlıabat, Devrekani
- Karaçam, Devrekani
- Karayazıcılar, Devrekani
- Kasaplar, Devrekani
- Kınık, Devrekani
- Kızacık, Devrekani
- Kurtköy, Devrekani
- Kuzköy, Devrekani
- Laçin, Devrekani
- Örenbaşı, Devrekani
- Pınarözü, Devrekani
- Saraydurak, Devrekani
- Sarıyonca, Devrekani
- Sarpunalınca, Devrekani
- Selahattinköy, Devrekani
- Sinantekke, Devrekani
- Şenlik, Devrekani
- Şeyhbali, Devrekani
- Tekkekızıllar, Devrekani
- Ulamış, Devrekani
- Yazıbelen, Devrekani
- Yazıhisar, Devrekani

== Doğanyurt ==
- Doğanyurt
- Akçabel, Doğanyurt
- Aşağımescit, Doğanyurt
- Baldıran, Doğanyurt
- Başköy, Doğanyurt
- Belyaka, Doğanyurt
- Boğazcık, Doğanyurt
- Çakırlı, Doğanyurt
- Danışman, Doğanyurt
- Demirci, Doğanyurt
- Denizbükü, Doğanyurt
- Denizgörülen, Doğanyurt
- Düz, Doğanyurt
- Düzağaç, Doğanyurt
- Gökçe, Doğanyurt
- Gözalan, Doğanyurt
- Gürmüdü, Doğanyurt
- Haskavak, Doğanyurt
- Kayran, Doğanyurt
- Köfünanbarı, Doğanyurt
- Küçüktepe, Doğanyurt
- Şirin, Doğanyurt
- Taşlıpınar, Doğanyurt
- Yassıkışla, Doğanyurt
- Yukarımescit, Doğanyurt

== Hanönü ==
- Hanönü
- Akçasu, Hanönü
- Bağdere, Hanönü
- Bölükyazı, Hanönü
- Çakırçay, Hanönü
- Çaybaşı, Hanönü
- Demircimüezzin, Hanönü
- Gökbelen, Hanönü
- Gökçeağaç, Hanönü
- Halkabük, Hanönü
- Hocavakıf, Hanönü
- Kavak, Hanönü
- Kayabaşı, Hanönü
- Küreçayı, Hanönü
- Sarıalan, Hanönü
- Sirke, Hanönü
- Yeniboyundurcak, Hanönü
- Yenice, Hanönü
- Yeniköy, Hanönü
- Yılanlı, Hanönü
- Yukarıçakırçay, Hanönü

== İhsangazi ==
- İhsangazi
- Akkaya, İhsangazi
- Akkirpi, İhsangazi
- Bedirgeriş, İhsangazi
- Belençal, İhsangazi
- Bozarmut, İhsangazi
- Çatalyazı, İhsangazi
- Çiçekpınar, İhsangazi
- Dağyolu, İhsangazi
- Enbiya, İhsangazi
- Görpe, İhsangazi
- Haydarlar, İhsangazi
- Hocahacip, İhsangazi
- İnciğez, İhsangazi
- Kapaklı, İhsangazi
- Kayapınar, İhsangazi
- Kızıleller, İhsangazi
- Koçcuğaz, İhsangazi
- Obruk, İhsangazi
- Örencik, İhsangazi
- Sarıpınar, İhsangazi
- Sepetçioğlu, İhsangazi
- Sünlük, İhsangazi
- Yarışlar, İhsangazi

== İnebolu ==
- İnebolu
- Akçay
- Akgüney
- Akkonak
- Aktaş
- Alaca
- Aşağıçaylı
- Atabeyli
- Ayvaköy
- Ayvat
- Başköy
- Bayıralan
- Belen
- Belence
- Belören
- Beyler
- Çamdalı
- Çamlıca
- Çaydüzü
- Çaykıyı
- Çiçekyazı
- Çubuk
- Deliktaş
- Deresökü
- Dibek
- Dikili
- Doğanören
- Durupınar
- Erenyolu
- Erkekarpa
- Esenyurt
- Gemiciler
- Göçkün
- Gökbel
- Gökçevre
- Güde
- Güneşli
- Hacıibrahim
- Hacımehmet
- Hamitköy
- Hayrioğlu
- Hörmetli
- İkiyaka
- İkizler
- Kabalar
- Kabalarsökü
- Karabey
- Karşıyaka
- Kayaelması
- Keloğlu
- Korupınar
- Köroğlu
- Köseköy
- Kuzluk
- Musaköy
- Örtülü
- Özbaşı
- Özlüce
- Sakalar
- Salıcıoğlu
- Soğukpınar
- Sökü
- Şamalı
- Şamaoğlu
- Şeyhömer
- Taşburun
- Taşoluk
- Toklukaya
- Uğrak
- Uluköy
- Uluyol
- Üçevler
- Üçlüce
- Yakaboyu
- Yamaç
- Yaztepe
- Yeşilöz
- Yolüstü
- Yukarıçaylı
- Yukarıköy
- Yunusköy
- Yuvacık

== Küre ==
- Küre
- Afşargüney, Küre
- Afşarimam, Küre
- Ahmetbeşe, Küre
- Alacık, Küre
- Avcıpınarı, Küre
- Belören, Küre
- Beşören, Küre
- Beyalan, Küre
- Bürüm, Küre
- Camili, Küre
- Canbaz, Küre
- Çat, Küre
- Çatak, Küre
- Çaybükü, Küre
- Ersizler, Küre
- Ersizlerdere, Küre
- Güllüce, Küre
- Güney, Küre
- İğdir, Küre
- İkizçiler, Küre
- İmralı, Küre
- Karadonu, Küre
- Karaman, Küre
- Kayadibi, Küre
- Kesepınar, Küre
- Koyunkırtık, Küre
- Kozköy, Küre
- Kösreli, Küre
- Köstekçiler, Küre
- Sarpun, Küre
- Sipahiler, Küre
- Taşpınar, Küre
- Topçu, Küre
- Uzunöz, Küre

== Pınarbaşı ==
- Pınarbaşı
- Aşağıaktaş, Pınarbaşı
- Başköy, Pınarbaşı
- Boğazkaya, Pınarbaşı
- Çavuşköy, Pınarbaşı
- Çengel, Pınarbaşı
- Demirtaş, Pınarbaşı
- Dizdarlı, Pınarbaşı
- Esentepe, Pınarbaşı
- Günberi, Pınarbaşı
- Hocalar, Pınarbaşı
- Ilıca, Pınarbaşı
- Kalaycı, Pınarbaşı
- Kapancı, Pınarbaşı
- Karacaören, Pınarbaşı
- Karafasıl, Pınarbaşı
- Kayabükü, Pınarbaşı
- Kerte, Pınarbaşı
- Kurtlugelik, Pınarbaşı
- Mirahor, Pınarbaşı
- Muratbaşı, Pınarbaşı
- Savaş, Pınarbaşı
- Sümenler, Pınarbaşı
- Urva, Pınarbaşı
- Uzla, Pınarbaşı
- Üyükören, Pınarbaşı
- Yamanlar, Pınarbaşı
- Yukarıaktaş, Pınarbaşı

== Seydiler ==
- Seydiler
- Çerçiler, Sediler
- Çırdak, Sediler
- Çiğilerik, Sediler
- Emreler, Sediler
- Ercek, Sediler
- İmrenler, Sediler
- İncesu, Sediler
- Karaçavuş, Sediler
- Kepez, Sediler
- Mancılık, Sediler
- Odabaşı, Sediler
- Sabuncular, Sediler
- Şalgam, Sediler
- Üyük, Sediler
- Yolyaka, Sediler

== Şenpazar ==
- Şenpazar
- Alancık, Şenpazar
- Aşıklı, Şenpazar
- Aybasan, Şenpazar
- Az.Kalaycı, Şenpazar
- Başçavuş, Şenpazar
- Büyükmutlu, Şenpazar
- Celallı, Şenpazar
- Dağlı, Şenpazar
- Demirkaya, Şenpazar
- Dereköy, Şenpazar
- Dördül, Şenpazar
- Edeler, Şenpazar
- Furuncuk, Şenpazar
- Gürleyik, Şenpazar
- Gürpelit, Şenpazar
- Harmangeriş, Şenpazar
- Himmet, Şenpazar
- Küçükmutlu, Şenpazar
- Salman, Şenpazar
- Sefer, Şenpazar
- Tepecik, Şenpazar
- Uzunyol, Şenpazar
- Yarımca, Şenpazar

== Taşköprü ==
- Taşköprü
- Abay, Taşköprü
- Abdalhasan, Taşköprü
- Afşar, Taşköprü
- Akçakese, Taşköprü
- Akdeğirmen, Taşköprü
- Akdoğan, Taşköprü
- Akdoğantekke, Taşköprü
- Akseki, Taşköprü
- Alamabatak, Taşköprü
- Alamakayış, Taşköprü
- Alamaşişli, Taşköprü
- Alasökü, Taşköprü
- Alatarla, Taşköprü
- Alipaşa, Taşköprü
- Alisaray, Taşköprü
- Armutlu, Taşköprü
- Arslanlı, Taşköprü
- Aşağıçayırcık, Taşköprü
- Aşağıçit, Taşköprü
- Aşağıemerce, Taşköprü
- Aşağışehirören, Taşköprü
- Ayvalı, Taşköprü
- Badembekdemir, Taşköprü
- Bademci, Taşköprü
- Bekdemirekşi, Taşköprü
- Bekirli, Taşköprü
- Beyköy, Taşköprü
- Boyundurcak, Taşköprü
- Bozarmut, Taşköprü
- Böcü, Taşköprü
- Bük, Taşköprü
- Celep, Taşköprü
- Çambaşı, Taşköprü
- Çaycevher, Taşköprü
- Çaykirpi, Taşköprü
- Çaylaklar, Taşköprü
- Çekiç, Taşköprü
- Çetmi, Taşköprü
- Çevik, Taşköprü
- Çiftkıran, Taşköprü
- Çiftlik, Taşköprü
- Çit, Taşköprü
- Çoroğlu, Taşköprü
- Çördük, Taşköprü
- Dağbelören, Taşköprü
- Dere, Taşköprü
- Derebeysibey, Taşköprü
- Derekaraağaç, Taşköprü
- Dilek, Taşköprü
- Donalar, Taşköprü
- Doymuş, Taşköprü
- Duruca, Taşköprü
- Erik, Taşköprü
- Ersil, Taşköprü
- Esenlik, Taşköprü
- Eskiatça, Taşköprü
- Eskioğlu, Taşköprü
- Garipşah, Taşköprü
- Gündoğdu, Taşköprü
- Güneykalınkese, Taşköprü
- Hacıali, Taşköprü
- Hamzaoğlu, Taşköprü
- Hasanlı, Taşköprü
- Hocaköy, Taşköprü
- İmamoğlu, Taşköprü
- İncesu, Taşköprü
- Kabalar, Taşköprü
- Kadıköy, Taşköprü
- Kapaklı, Taşköprü
- Karacakaya, Taşköprü
- Karacaoğlu, Taşköprü
- Karadedeoğlu, Taşköprü
- Karapürçek, Taşköprü
- Karnıaçık, Taşköprü
- Karşı, Taşköprü
- Kayadibi, Taşköprü
- Kayapınar, Taşköprü
- Kaygınca, Taşköprü
- Kese, Taşköprü
- Kılıçlı, Taşköprü
- Kıran, Taşköprü
- Kırha, Taşköprü
- Kızılcaören, Taşköprü
- Kızılcaörhen, Taşköprü
- Kızılkese, Taşköprü
- Kirazcık, Taşköprü
- Koçanlı, Taşköprü
- Kornapa, Taşköprü
- Köçekli, Taşköprü
- Kuyluş, Taşköprü
- Kuzkalınkese, Taşköprü
- Küçüksüq, Taşköprü
- Masatlar, Taşköprü
- Obrucak, Taşköprü
- Olukbaşı, Taşköprü
- Ortaköy, Taşköprü
- Ortaöz, Taşköprü
- Oymaağaçseki, Taşköprü
- Ömerli, Taşköprü
- Örhen, Taşköprü
- Örhenli, Taşköprü
- Paşaköy, Taşköprü
- Pirahmetli, Taşköprü
- Samanlıören, Taşköprü
- Sarıkavak, Taşköprü
- Sarıseki, Taşköprü
- Sarpun, Taşköprü
- Şahinçatı, Taşköprü
- Şehirören, Taşköprü
- Taşçılar, Taşköprü
- Tavukçuoğlu, Taşköprü
- Tekeoğlu, Taşköprü
- Tepedelik, Taşköprü
- Tokaş, Taşköprü
- Urgancı, Taşköprü
- Uzunkavak, Taşköprü
- Vakıfbelören, Taşköprü
- Yavuç, Taşköprü
- Yavuçkuyucağı, Taşköprü
- Yazıhamit, Taşköprü
- Yeniler, Taşköprü
- Yeşilyurt, Taşköprü
- Yoğunoluk, Taşköprü
- Yukarıçayırcık, Taşköprü
- Yukarıemerce, Taşköprü
- Yukarışehirören, Taşköprü

== Tosya ==
- Tosya
- Ahmetoğlu, Tosya
- Akbük, Tosya
- Akseki, Tosya
- Aşağıberçin, Tosya
- Aşağıdikmen, Tosya
- Aşağıkayı, Tosya
- Bayat, Tosya
- Bürnük, Tosya
- Çakırlar, Tosya
- Çaybaşı, Tosya
- Çaykapı, Tosya
- Çeltikçi, Tosya
- Çepni, Tosya
- Çevlik, Tosya
- Çifter, Tosya
- Çukurköy, Tosya
- Dağardı, Tosya
- Dağçatağı, Tosya
- Dedem, Tosya
- Ekincik, Tosya
- Ermelik, Tosya
- Gökçeöz, Tosya
- Gökomuz, Tosya
- Gövrecik, Tosya
- İncebel, Tosya
- Karabey, Tosya
- Karaköy, Tosya
- Karasapaça, Tosya
- Kargın, Tosya
- Kayaönü, Tosya
- Keçeli, Tosya
- Kınık, Tosya
- Kızılca, Tosya
- Kilkuyu, Tosya
- Kösen, Tosya
- Kuşçular, Tosya
- Küçükkızılca, Tosya
- Küçüksekiler, Tosya
- Mısmılağaç, Tosya
- Musaköy, Tosya
- Ortalıca, Tosya
- Özboyu, Tosya
- Sapaca, Tosya
- Sekiler, Tosya
- Sevinçören, Tosya
- Sofular, Tosya
- Suluca, Tosya
- Şarakman, Tosya
- Yağcılar, Tosya
- Yenidoğan, Tosya
- Yukarıberçin, Tosya
- Yukarıdikmen, Tosya
- Yukarıkayı, Tosya
- Zincirlikuyu, Tosya
