= Zephyrium (disambiguation) =

Zephyrium or Zephyrion was an ancient name of Mersin, a city in Turkey and a titular see of the Roman Catholic Church.

Zephyrium or Zephyrion (Ancient Greek: Ζεφύριον) may also refer to:

- Zephyrium (Crimea), an ancient town located in Crimea
- Zephyrium (Paphlagonia), a town of ancient Paphlagonia, now in Turkey
- Zephyrium (Pontus), a town of ancient Pontus, now in Turkey
- Zephyrium on the Calycadnus, a town of ancient Cilicia, now in Turkey
