= Hocaköy =

Hocaköy can refer to the following villages in Turkey:

- Hocaköy, Akseki
- Hocaköy, Azdavay
- Hocaköy, İnegöl
- Hocaköy, İznik
- Hocaköy, Kastamonu
- Hocaköy, Taşköprü
- Hocaköy, Ulus
- Hocaköy, Yığılca
