= Gömmece =

Gömmece may refer to:

- Gömmece, Kastamonu, village in Kastamonu Province, Turkey
- Gömmece, Tarsus, village in Mersin Province, Turkey
