= Akçakese =

Akçakese (literally "quite white shortcut") is a Turkish place name that may refer to the following places in Turkey:

- Akçakese, Ağlı, a village in Ağlı
- Akçakese, Güdül, a village in the district of Güdül, Ankara Province
- Akçakese, Kastamonu, a village in the district of Kastamonu, Kastamonu Province
- Akçakese, Taşköprü, a village
