= Ahlatçık =

Ahlatçık can refer to:

- Ahlatçık, Devrekani, village in Turkey
- Ahlatcık, İskilip
- Ahlatçık, Kastamonu, village in Turkey
