= İsmayıllı (disambiguation) =

İsmayıllı is the capital city of Ismailli District, Azerbaijan.

İsmayıllı may also refer to:

- Ismayilli District, a rayon of Azerbaijan
- İsmayıllı, Kurdamir, a village and municipality in Kurdamir Rayon, Azerbaijan

== See also ==
- Ismilli, a village in Neftchala Rayon, Azerbaijan
- İsmailli (disambiguation)
