= Umit =

Umit or UMIT may refer to

- Ümit, a Turkish name
- Ümit, Kastamonu, a village in Turkey
- Umit oil field in Turkey
- UMIT - Private University for Health Sciences, Medical Informatics and Technology in Tirol, Austria
- UMIT, a user interface for Nmap
