= İsmailli =

İsmailli may refer to the following places in Turkey:

- İsmailli, Akkaya, a village in Kastamonu Province
- İsmailli, Alaca, a village in Çorum Province
- İsmailli, Kuzyaka or Aşağıismailli, a village in Kastamonu Province
- İsmailli, Mazgirt, a village in Tunceli Province

== See also ==
- Ismailli State Reserve, a protected area in Azerbaijan
- Ismayilli (disambiguation)
