= Koruköy =

Koruköy can refer to:

- Koruköy, Adıyaman
- Koruköy, Dicle
- Koruköy, Elâzığ
- Koruköy, Gelibolu
- Koruköy, Kastamonu
- Koruköy, Yenice
