= Akmescit =

Akmescit may refer to:

- Akmescit, Devrekani, a village in Turkey
- Akmescit, Koçarlı, a village in western Turkey
- Akmescit, Crimea, the name referring to Simferopol by the local Crimean Tatars
