= Yunusköy =

Yunusköy can refer to:

- Yunusköy, İspir
- Yunusköy, Kastamonu
