= Hatipoğlu =

Hatipoğlu can refer to:

- Hatipoğlu, Kastamonu
- Hatipoğlu, Kayapınar
