= Çorumlu =

Çorumlu is a toponym and a Turkish surname. It may refer to:

- Çorumlu, Kastamonu, village in the District of Kastamonu, Kastamonu Province, Turkey

== People with the surname ==
- Çağlar Çorumlu (born 1977), Turkish actor
