= Çiğil =

Çiğil can refer to:

- Çiğil, Kastamonu
- Çiğil, Silvan
