= Obruk =

Obruk may refer to the following places in Turkey:

- Obruk, Bor
- Obruk, Kastamonu
- Obruk Dam
