= Hacıköy =

Hacıköy may refer to:

- Hacıköy, Bayramiç
- Hacıköy, Biga
- Hacıköy, Gölpazarı
- Hacıköy, Kalecik
- Hacıköy, Kastamonu
- Hacıköy, Kurucaşile
- Hacıköy, Refahiye
- Gümüşhacıköy, Amasya
