= Tekkeköy (disambiguation) =

Tekkeköy is a place name in Turkish and it may refer to

- Tekkeköy - a district of Samsun Province
- Tekkeköy, Ayaş - a village in Ayaş district of Ankara Province
- Tekkeköy, Çivril
- Tekkeköy, Elmadağ -a village in Elmadağ district of Ankara Province
- Tekkeköy, İnegöl
- Tekkeköy, Nallıhan - a village in Nallıhan district of Ankara province
- Tekkeköy, Elmalı - a village in Elmalı district of Antalya Province
- Tekkeköy, Serik - a village in Serik district of Antalya Province
- Tekkeköy, Kastamonu - a village in the central district of Kastamonu Province
- Tekkeköy, Tavas

== See also ==
- Tekkeköyü, Şuhut - a village in Şuhut district of Afyonkarahisar Province
