= Hatipköy =

Hatipköy can refer to:

- Hatipköy, Edirne
- Hatipköy, Kastamonu
