= Yukarıkuyucak =

Yukarıkuyucak can refer to:

- Yukarıkuyucak, Kastamonu
- Yukarıkuyucak, Ortaköy
