= İslamköy =

İslamköy may refer to:

- İslamköy, a former name of Banaz, a town in Uşak Province, Turkey
- İslamköy, Kastamonu, a village in Kastamonu Province, Turkey
- İslamköy, Devrek, a village in Devrek District, Zonguldak Province, Turkey
- İslamköy, İliç
- İslamköy, Kahta, a village in the District of Kahta, Adıyaman Province
- İslamköy, Kulp
