= Bükköy =

Bükköy can refer to:

- Bükköy, Devrek
- Bükköy, Kastamonu
- Bükköy, Mustafakemalpaşa
