= Köseoğlu =

Köseoğlu is a Turkishword. It may refer to:

== People ==
- Hakan Köseoğlu (born 1981), Turkish former professional basketball player
- Hayal Köseoğlu (born 1992), Turkish television, theater actress and musician
- Leyla Yeniay Köseoğlu (1926–2002), Turkish female politician
- Selâhattin Köseoğlu (1882–1949), Turkish military officer and politician
- Selin Köseoğlu (born 1991), Turkish actress

== Places ==
- Köseoğlu, Kastamonu, a village in Kastamony Province, Turkey
