= Solyma =

Prehistoric town in Turkey

Coordinates: 36°31′29″N 30°27′15″E

Solyma was a town in south-west Anatolia (modern Turkey) during prehistory, located in a country named Solymia (which was known later as Milyas and Lycia).

The name Solyma is not directly attested but has been inferred from inscriptions and other evidence. Its site is believed to have been near modern Fırıncık, in Ağlı district, Kastamonu Province.
