= Yolkonak =

Yolkonak (literally "road mansion" or "road inn" in Turkish) may refer to the following places in Turkey:

- Yolkonak, Beşiri, a village in the district of Beşiri, Batman Province
- Yolkonak, Kastamonu, a village in the district of Kastamonu, Kastamonu Province
- Yolkonak, Sandıklı, a village in the district of Sandıklı, Afyonkarahisar Province
