= Ahmetbey =

Ahmetbey can refer to:

- Ahmetbey, Kastamonu
- Ahmetbey, Osmangazi
