= Tarlatepe =

Tarlatepe can refer to:

- Tarlatepe, Kastamonu
- Tarlatepe, Sivrice
