= Şeyhköy =

Şeyhköy can refer to:

- Şeyhköy, İskilip
- Şeyhköy, Kastamonu
