= Kurtköy =

Kurtköy can refer to the following villages in Turkey:

- Kurtköy, Bilecik
- Kurtköy, Devrekani
- Kurtköy, Pendik
- Kurtköy, Zonguldak

== See also ==
- Kurtköy High School
