= Mollaköy =

Mollaköy can refer to:

- Mollaköy, Erzincan
- Mollaköy, Kastamonu
