= Çıbanköy, Kastamonu =

Çıbanköy
- Village
- Location within Turkey
- Coordinates: 41°12′N 34°02′E
- Country: Turkey
- Province: Kastamonu
- District: Kastamonu
- Population (2021): 94
- Time zone: UTC+3 (TRT)

Çıbanköy is a village in the Kastamonu District, Kastamonu Province, Turkey. Its population is 94 (2021).
