= Bereketli, Ağlı =

Village in Turkey

Bereketli
- Village
- Location in Turkey
- Coordinates: 41°41′49″N 33°29′44″E
- Country: Turkey
- Province: Kastamonu
- District: Ağlı
- Population (2021): 105
- Time zone: UTC+3 (TRT)

Bereketli is a village in the Ağlı District of Kastamonu Province in Turkey. Its population is 105 (2021).
