= Oğulköy, Kastamonu =

Oğulköy
- Village
- Location within Turkey
- Coordinates: 41°28′N 33°54′E
- Country: Turkey
- Province: Kastamonu
- District: Kastamonu
- Population (2021): 192
- Time zone: UTC+3 (TRT)

Oğulköy is a village in the Kastamonu District, Kastamonu Province, Turkey. Its population is 192 (2021).
