= Dereköy, Kastamonu =

Dereköy
- Village
- Location within Turkey
- Coordinates: 41°25′36″N 33°48′52″E
- Country: Turkey
- Province: Kastamonu
- District: Kastamonu
- Population (2021): 202
- Time zone: UTC+3 (TRT)

Dereköy is a village in the Kastamonu District, Kastamonu Province, Turkey. Its population is 202 (2021).
