= Ahlatköy, Kastamonu =

Ahlatköy
- Village
- Location in Turkey
- Coordinates: 41°11′25″N 33°53′38″E
- Country: Turkey
- Province: Kastamonu
- District: Kastamonu
- Population (2021): 149
- Time zone: UTC+3 (TRT)

Ahlatköy is a village in the Kastamonu District, Kastamonu Province, Turkey. Its population was 149 in 2021.
