= Bostanköy, Kastamonu =

Bostanköy
- Village
- Location within Turkey
- Coordinates: 41°06′N 33°46′E
- Country: Turkey
- Province: Kastamonu
- District: Kastamonu
- Population (2021): 322
- Time zone: UTC+3 (TRT)

Bostanköy (also: Bostan) is a village in the Kastamonu District, Kastamonu Province, Turkey. Its population is 322 (2021).
