= Emirler, Kuzyaka =

Emirler
- Village
- Location within Turkey
- Coordinates: 41°14′43″N 33°45′11″E
- Country: Turkey
- Province: Kastamonu
- District: Kastamonu
- Population (2021): 142
- Time zone: UTC+3 (TRT)

Emirler is a village in the Kastamonu District, Kastamonu Province, Turkey. Its population is 142 (2021).
