= Kavakköy, Kastamonu =

Kavakköy
- Village
- Location within Turkey
- Coordinates: 41°22′41″N 33°38′11″E
- Country: Turkey
- Province: Kastamonu
- District: Kastamonu
- Population (2021): 144
- Time zone: UTC+3 (TRT)

Kavakköy is a village in the Kastamonu District, Kastamonu Province, Turkey. Its population is 144 (2021).
