= Devrekani District =

District of Kastamonu Province, Turkey

- District
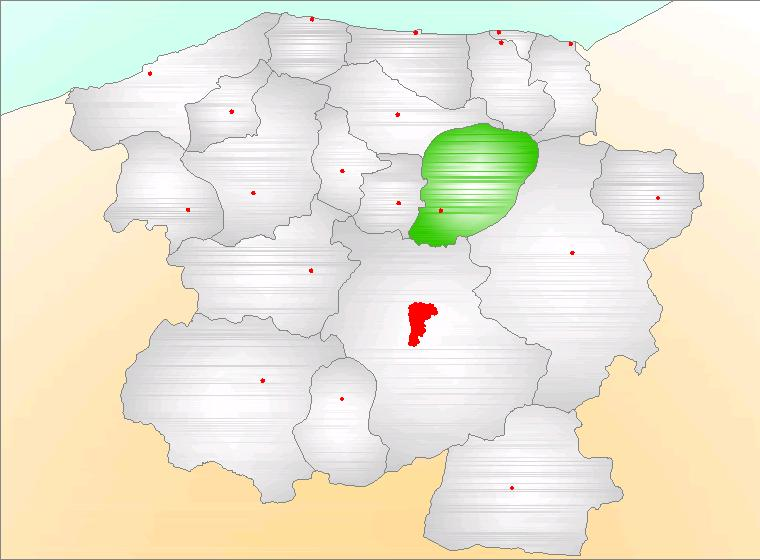
- Map showing Devrekani District (green) in Kastamonu Province

- Location in Turkey
- Coordinates: 41°36′N 33°50′E
- Country: Turkey
- Province: Kastamonu
- Seat: Devrekani

Government
  - Kaymakam: Ahmet Coşkun
- Area: 715 km^{2} (276 sq mi)
- Population (2021): 12,132
  - Density: 17/km^{2} (44/sq mi)
- Time zone: UTC+3 (TRT)
- Website: www.devrekani.gov.tr

Devrekani District is a district of the Kastamonu Province of Turkey. Its seat is the town of Devrekani. Its area is 715 km^{2}, and its population is 12,132 (2021).

== Composition ==
There is one municipality in Devrekani District:

- Devrekani

There are 54 villages in Devrekani District:

- Ahlatçık
- Akçapınar
- Akdoğan
- Akmescit
- Alaçay
- Alçılar
- Alınören
- Arslanbey
- Asarcık
- Balabanlar
- Baltıcak
- Başakpınar
- Başakpınartepe
- Belovacık
- Bınkıldayık
- Bozarmut
- Bozkoca
- Bozkocatepe
- Çatak
- Çavuşlu
- Çontay
- Çorbacı
- Çörekçi
- Doğuörcünler
- Elmalıtekke
- Erenler
- Fakılar
- Göynükören
- Habeşli
- Hasırlı
- İnciğez
- Kadıoğlu
- Kanlıabat
- Karaçam
- Karayazıcılar
- Kasaplar
- Kınık
- Kızacık
- Kurtköy
- Kuzköy
- Laçin
- Örenbaşı
- Pınarözü
- Saraydurak
- Sarıyonca
- Sarpınalınca
- Selahattinköy
- Sinantekke
- Şenlik
- Şeyhbali
- Tekkekızıllar
- Ulamış
- Yazıbelen
- Yazıhisar
