= Kuzyaka, Kastamonu =

Kuzyaka
- Village
- Location within Turkey
- Coordinates: 41°13′58″N 33°43′18″E
- Country: Turkey
- Province: Kastamonu
- District: Kastamonu
- Population (2021): 136
- Time zone: UTC+3 (TRT)

Kuzyaka is a village in the Kastamonu District, Kastamonu Province, Turkey. Its population is 136 (2021).
