= Cambaz, Kastamonu =

Cambaz
- Village
- Location within Turkey
- Coordinates: 41.1855°N 33.6558°E
- Country: Turkey
- Province: Kastamonu
- District: Kastamonu
- Population (2021): 64
- Time zone: UTC+3 (TRT)

Cambaz is a village in the Kastamonu District, Kastamonu Province, Turkey. Its population is 64 (2021).
