= Kasaplar, Devrekani =

Kasaplar
- Village
- Location in Turkey
- Coordinates: 41.623°N 33.860°E
- Country: Turkey
- Province: Kastamonu
- District: Devrekani
- Population (2022): 142
- Time zone: UTC+3 (TRT)

Kasaplar is a village of Devrekani District in Kastamonu Province, Turkey. Its population is 142 (2022). It is 33 km from Kastamonu and 3 km from Devrekani.

== Population ==
Historical population
Year	Pop.	±% p.a.
1997	183	—
2007	133	−3.14%
2012	151	+2.57%
2017	151	+0.00%
2022	142	−1.22%
Source: 1997 census and TÜIK (2007-2022)
