= Halime Çavuş =

Turkish militia member (1898–1976)

Halime Kocabıyık
- Born: 1898; Duruçay, Kastamonu Province
- Died: 1976 (aged 77–78); Duruçay, Kastamonu Province
- Military career
- Allegiance: Turkey
- Service years: 1919–1923
- Rank: Sergeant
- Nickname: Halime Çavuş
- Commands: Militia
- Conflicts: Turkish War of Independence
- Awards: Medal of Independence

Halime Çavuş (1898–1976) (literally "Sergeant Halime", later Halime Kocabıyık) was a Turkish woman who disguised herself as a man in order to serve in a militia during the Turkish War of Independence.

== Life ==
She was born in Duruçay village of Kastamonu Province in 1898. Although her father and mother were reluctant, she wanted to take part in the Turkish War of Independence (1919–1923) and so joined the nationalist forces in disguise as a man. She was known by her colleagues under the name Halim. She served in the logistics of the army. The main supply road of the nationalists was between İnebolu port on the Black Sea and Ankara, the declared capital of the nationalists. Halime used to carry weapon and ammunition on the road on oxen carts.

On 9 June 1921 the Greek cruiser Georgios Averof and Greek battleship Kilkis bombarded İnebolu and Halime was badly wounded in the leg. Due to permanent disability, she had to abandon her activity. At the end of the war, she was invited to Ankara to meet Mustafa Kemal Pasha (later Atatürk), the founder of Turkish Republic, and his wife Latife. She was promoted to the rank of a sergeant and was decorated with the Medal of Independence. She was also put on a special retirement salary.

After the enactment of the Surname Law in 1934, she took the family name "Kocabıyık". She adopted her brother's son Sadık. Halime Kocabıyık died on 20 February 1976.

== Legacy ==
There are two schools named after Halime Çavuş; Söğütu kindergarten in Sakarya Province and Primary school for the deaf in Kastamonu.
