= Emirler, Kastamonu =

Emirler
- Village
- Location within Turkey
- Coordinates: 41°27′31″N 33°45′35″E
- Country: Turkey
- Province: Kastamonu
- District: Kastamonu
- Population (2021): 270
- Time zone: UTC+3 (TRT)

Emirler is a village in the Kastamonu District, Kastamonu Province, Turkey. Its population is 270 (2021).
