= Doğanyurt District =

District of Kastamonu Province, Turkey

- District
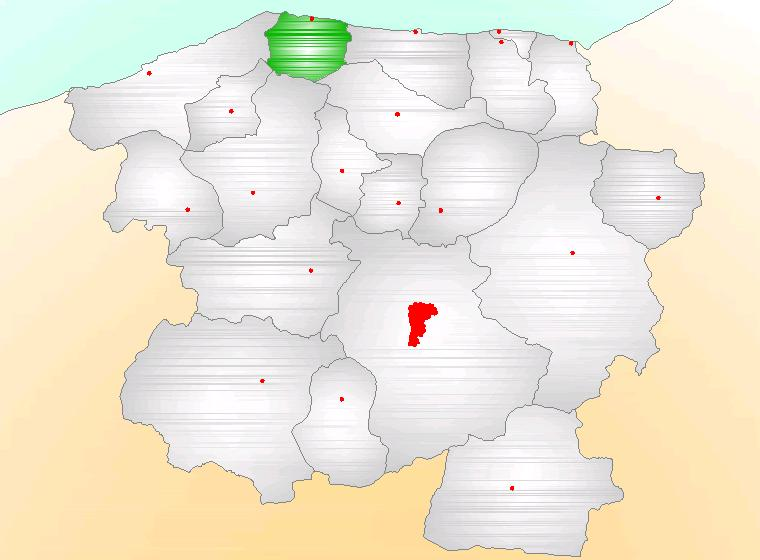
- Map showing Doğanyurt District (green) in Kastamonu Province

- Location in Turkey
- Coordinates: 42°00′N 33°27′E
- Country: Turkey
- Province: Kastamonu
- Seat: Doğanyurt

Government
  - Kaymakam: Muhammed Cezmi Kandemir
- Area: 193 km^{2} (75 sq mi)
- Population (2021): 5,428
  - Density: 28/km^{2} (73/sq mi)
- Time zone: UTC+3 (TRT)
- Website: www.doganyurt.gov.tr

Doğanyurt District is a district of the Kastamonu Province of Turkey. Its seat is the town of Doğanyurt. Its area is 193 km^{2}, and its population is 5,428 (2021).

== Composition ==
There is one municipality in Doğanyurt District:

- Doğanyurt

There are 25 villages in Doğanyurt District:

- Akçabel
- Aşağımescit
- Baldıran
- Başköy
- Belyaka
- Boğazcık
- Çakırlı
- Danışman
- Demirci
- Denizbükü
- Denizgörülen
- Düz
- Düzağaç
- Gökçe
- Gözalan
- Gürmüdü
- Haskavak
- Kayran
- Köfünambarı
- Küçüktepe
- Ortaburun
- Şirin
- Taşlıpınar
- Yassıkışla
- Yukarımescit
