= Ortaköy, Kastamonu =

Ortaköy
- Village
- Location within Turkey
- Country: Turkey
- Province: Kastamonu
- District: Kastamonu
- Population (2021): 137
- Time zone: UTC+3 (TRT)

Ortaköy is a village in the Kastamonu District, Kastamonu Province, Turkey. Its population is 137 (2021).
