= Hamitköy, Kastamonu =

Hamitköy
- Village
- Location within Turkey
- Coordinates: 41.211°N 33.734°E
- Country: Turkey
- Province: Kastamonu
- District: Kastamonu
- Population (2021): 68
- Time zone: UTC+3 (TRT)

Hamitköy is a village in the Kastamonu District, Kastamonu Province, Turkey. Its population is 68 (2021).
