= Hanönü District =

District of Kastamonu Province, Turkey

- District
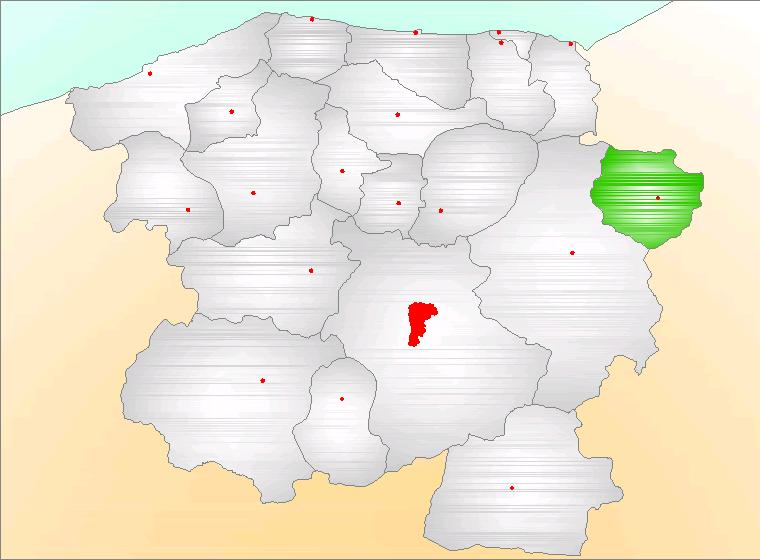
- Map showing Hanönü District (green) in Kastamonu Province

- Location in Turkey
- Coordinates: 41°38′N 34°28′E
- Country: Turkey
- Province: Kastamonu
- Seat: Hanönü

Government
  - Kaymakam: Tolga Değirmenci
- Area: 417 km^{2} (161 sq mi)
- Population (2021): 4,134
  - Density: 9.9/km^{2} (26/sq mi)
- Time zone: UTC+3 (TRT)
- Website: www.hanonu.gov.tr

Hanönü District is a district of the Kastamonu Province of Turkey. Its seat is the town of Hanönü. Its area is 417 km^{2}, and its population is 4,134 (2021).

== Composition ==
There is one municipality in Hanönü District:

- Hanönü

There are 20 villages in Hanönü District:

- Akçasu
- Bağdere
- Bölükyazı
- Çakırçay
- Çaybaşı
- Demircimüezzin
- Gökbelen
- Gökçeağaç
- Halkabük
- Hocavakıf
- Kavakköy
- Kayabaşı
- Küreçayı
- Sarıalan
- Sirkeköy
- Yeniboyundurcak
- Yenice
- Yeniköy
- Yılanlı
- Yukarıçakırçayı
