= Alçıcılar, Kastamonu =

Alçıcılar
- Village
- Location within Turkey
- Coordinates: 41°30′N 33°54′E
- Country: Turkey
- Province: Kastamonu
- District: Kastamonu
- Population (2021): 270
- Time zone: UTC+3 (TRT)

Alçıcılar (also: Alçucular) is a village in the Kastamonu District, Kastamonu Province, Turkey. Its population is 270 (2021).
