= Zephyrium (Paphlagonia) =

Ancient site in Paphlagonia

Coordinates: 42°00′46″N 33°26′53″E

Zephyrium or Zephyrion (Ancient Greek: Ζεφύριον) was a town of ancient Paphlagonia, located 60 stadia to the west of Cape Carambis, mentioned by several ancient authors.

Its site is located near Doğanyurt in Asiatic Turkey.
