= Ağlı District =

District of Kastamonu Province, Turkey

- District
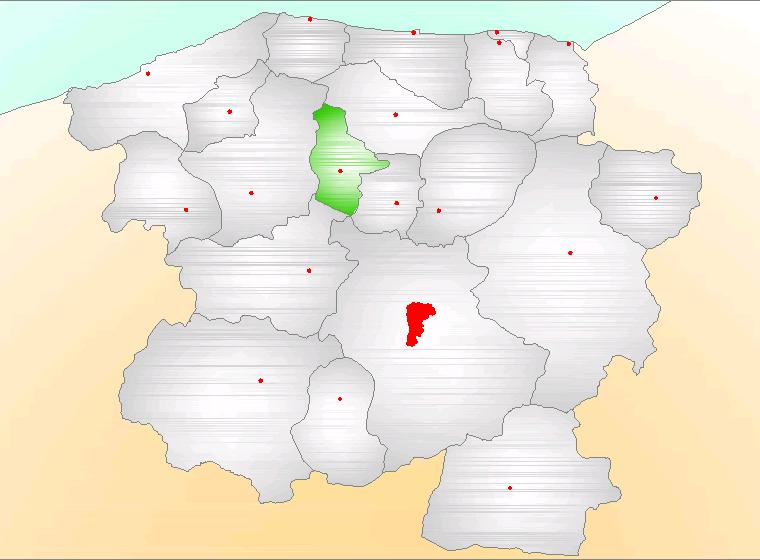
- Map showing Ağlı District (green) in Kastamonu Province

- Location in Turkey
- Coordinates: 41°43′N 33°33′E
- Country: Turkey
- Province: Kastamonu
- Seat: Ağlı

Government
  - Kaymakam: Salih AĞAR
- Area: 225 km^{2} (87 sq mi)
- Population (2021): 3,006
  - Density: 13.4/km^{2} (34.6/sq mi)
- Time zone: UTC+3 (TRT)
- Website: www.agli.gov.tr

Ağlı District is a district of the Kastamonu Province of Turkey. Its seat is the town of Ağlı. Its area is 225 km^{2}, and its population is 3,006 (2021). According to the Law No. 3644, which entered into force on 20 May 1990, it became a district.

== Composition ==
There is one municipality in Ağlı District:

- Ağlı

There are 14 villages in Ağlı District:

- Adalar
- Akçakese
- Akdivan
- Bereketli
- Fırıncık
- Geccüğez
- Gölcüğez
- Kabacı
- Müsellimler
- Oluközü
- Selmanlı
- Tunuslar
- Turnacık
- Yeşilpınar
