= Budamış, Kastamonu =

Budamış
- Neighbourhood
- Location in Turkey
- Coordinates: 41.3396°N 33.7621°E
- Country: Turkey
- Province: Kastamonu
- District: Kastamonu
- Municipality: Kastamonu
- Population (2021): 1,454
- Time zone: UTC+3 (TRT)

Budamış is a neighbourhood of the city Kastamonu, Kastamonu District, Kastamonu Province, Turkey. Its population is 1,454 (2021).
