= Balabanlar, Devrekani =

Village in Turkey

Balabanlar
- Village
- Location in Turkey
- Coordinates: 41°36′02″N 33°47′08″E
- Country: Turkey
- Province: Kastamonu
- District: Devrekani
- Population (2021): 153
- Time zone: UTC+3 (TRT)

Balabanlar is a village in the Devrekani District of Kastamonu Province in Turkey. Its population is 153 (2021).
