= Bahadır, Kastamonu =

Bahadır
- Village
- Location within Turkey
- Coordinates: 41.2748°N 33.7604°E
- Country: Turkey
- Province: Kastamonu
- District: Kastamonu
- Population (2021): 140
- Time zone: UTC+3 (TRT)

Bahadır is a village in the Kastamonu District, Kastamonu Province, Turkey. Its population is 140 (2021).
