= Fakılar, Devrekani =

Village in Turkey

Fakılar
- Village
- Location in Turkey
- Coordinates: 41°40′36″N 33°48′11″E
- Country: Turkey
- Province: Kastamonu
- District: Devrekani
- Population (2021): 80
- Time zone: UTC+3 (TRT)

Fakılar is a village in the Devrekani District of Kastamonu Province in Turkey. Its population is 80 (2021).
