= Geyikli, Kastamonu =

Geyikli
- Village
- Location within Turkey
- Country: Turkey
- Province: Kastamonu
- District: Kastamonu
- Population (2021): 93
- Time zone: UTC+3 (TRT)

Geyikli is a village in the Kastamonu District, Kastamonu Province, Turkey. Its population is 93 (2021).
