= Belyaka, Doğanyurt =

Village in Turkey

Belyaka
- Village
- Location in Turkey
- Coordinates: 42°00′43″N 33°23′19″E
- Country: Turkey
- Province: Kastamonu
- District: Doğanyurt
- Population (2021): 143
- Time zone: UTC+3 (TRT)

Belyaka is a village in the Doğanyurt District of Kastamonu Province in Turkey. Its population is 143 (2021).
