= Zephyrium (Pontus) =

Zephyrium or Zephyrion (Ancient Greek: Ζεφύριον) was a town of ancient Pontus in the territory of the Mosynoeci, located on a promontory of the same name, 90 stadia to the west of Tripolis, mentioned by several ancient authors.

The promontory is identified as Çam Burnu (formerly Zefre Burnu) in Asiatic Turkey, but the town is unlocated.
