= Kurucaören, Kastamonu =

Kurucaören
- Village
- Location within Turkey
- Coordinates: 41°19′N 33°35′E
- Country: Turkey
- Province: Kastamonu
- District: Kastamonu
- Population (2021): 43
- Time zone: UTC+3 (TRT)

Kurucaören is a village in the Kastamonu District, Kastamonu Province, Turkey. Its population is 43 (2021).
