= Tekkekızıllar, Devrekani =

Village in Turkey

Tekkekızıllar
- Village
- Location in Turkey
- Coordinates: 41°40′34″N 33°51′21″E
- Country: Turkey
- Province: Kastamonu
- District: Devrekani
- Population (2021): 155
- Time zone: UTC+3 (TRT)

Tekkekızıllar is a village in the Devrekani District of Kastamonu Province in Turkey. Its population is 155 (2021).
