= Sapaca, Kastamonu =

Sapaca
- Village
- Location within Turkey
- Country: Turkey
- Province: Kastamonu
- District: Kastamonu
- Population (2021): 86
- Time zone: UTC+3 (TRT)

Sapaca is a village in the Kastamonu District, Kastamonu Province, Turkey. Its population is 86 (2021).
