= Hanönü =

Town in Kastamonu Province, Turkey

- Municipality
- Location within Turkey
- Coordinates: 41°37′31″N 34°27′48″E
- Country: Turkey
- Province: Kastamonu
- District: Hanönü

Government
  - Mayor: Serkan Uçar (AKP)
- Elevation: 508 m (1,667 ft)
- Population (2021): 2,111
- Time zone: UTC+3 (TRT)
- Area code: 0366
- Climate: Cfb
- Website: www.hanonu.bel.tr

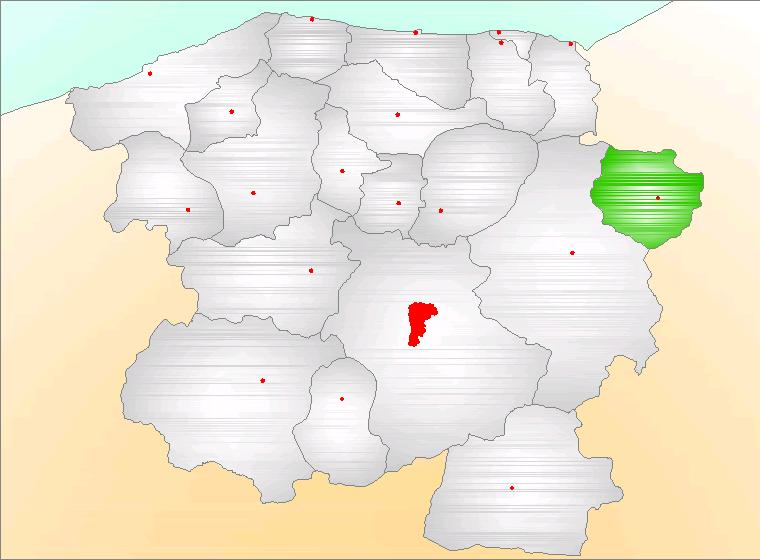

Hanönü, also Gökçeağaç, is a town in the Kastamonu Province in the Black Sea region of Turkey. It is the seat of Hanönü District. Its population is 2,111 (2021). The town lies at an elevation of 508 m (1,667 ft).
