= Koruköy, Kastamonu =

Koruköy
- Village
- Location within Turkey
- Coordinates: 41°26′17″N 33°48′42″E
- Country: Turkey
- Province: Kastamonu
- District: Kastamonu
- Population (2021): 135
- Time zone: UTC+3 (TRT)

Koruköy is a village in the Kastamonu District, Kastamonu Province, Turkey. Its population is 135 (2021).
