= Burhanlı, Kastamonu =

Burhanlı
- Village
- Location within Turkey
- Coordinates: 41.1904°N 33.9420°E
- Country: Turkey
- Province: Kastamonu
- District: Kastamonu
- Population (2021): 120
- Time zone: UTC+3 (TRT)

Burhanlı is a village in the Kastamonu District, Kastamonu Province, Turkey. Its population is 120 (2021).
