= Halifekuyucağı, Kastamonu =

Halifekuyucağı
- Village
- Location within Turkey
- Coordinates: 41°29′N 33°45′E
- Country: Turkey
- Province: Kastamonu
- District: Kastamonu
- Population (2021): 121
- Time zone: UTC+3 (TRT)

Halifekuyucağı is a village in the district of Kastamonu, Kastamonu Province, Turkey. Its population is 121 (2021).
