= Bükköy, Kastamonu =

Bükköy
- Village
- Location within Turkey
- Coordinates: 41.4834°N 33.9109°E
- Country: Turkey
- Province: Kastamonu
- District: Kastamonu
- Population (2021): 394
- Time zone: UTC+3 (TRT)

Bükköy (also: Bük) is a village in the Kastamonu District, Kastamonu Province, Turkey. Its population is 394 (2021).
