= Aşağıakça, Kastamonu =

Aşağıakça
- Village
- Location within Turkey
- Coordinates: 41°11′N 33°44′E
- Country: Turkey
- Province: Kastamonu
- District: Kastamonu
- Population (2021): 78
- Time zone: UTC+3 (TRT)

Aşağıakça is a village in the Kastamonu District, Kastamonu Province, Turkey. Its population is 78 (2021).
