= Akçataş, Kastamonu =

Akçataş
- Village
- Location within Turkey
- Coordinates: 41.1933°N 34.0146°E
- Country: Turkey
- Province: Kastamonu
- District: Kastamonu
- Population (2021): 173
- Time zone: UTC+3 (TRT)

Akçataş is a village in the Kastamonu District, Kastamonu Province, Turkey. Its population is 173 (2021).
