= Şeyhköy, Kastamonu =

Şeyhköy
- Village
- Country: Turkey
- Province: Kastamonu
- District: Kastamonu
- Population (2021): 122
- Time zone: UTC+3 (TRT)

Şeyhköy is a village in the Kastamonu District, Kastamonu Province, Turkey. Its population is 122 (2021).
