= Girdallı, Kastamonu =

Girdallı
- Village
- Location within Turkey
- Coordinates: 41°14′N 34°01′E
- Country: Turkey
- Province: Kastamonu
- District: Kastamonu
- Population (2021): 73
- Time zone: UTC+3 (TRT)

Girdallı is a village in the Kastamonu District, Kastamonu Province, Turkey. Its population is 73 (2021).
