= İmamköy, Kastamonu =

İmamköy
- Village
- Location within Turkey
- Country: Turkey
- Province: Kastamonu
- District: Kastamonu
- Population (2021): 109
- Time zone: UTC+3 (TRT)

İmamköy is a village in the Kastamonu District, Kastamonu Province, Turkey. Its population is 109 (2021).
