= Aksinir, Kastamonu =

Aksinir
- Village
- Location within Turkey
- Coordinates: 41°30′N 33°46′E
- Country: Turkey
- Province: Kastamonu
- District: Kastamonu
- Population (2021): 112
- Time zone: UTC+3 (TRT)

Aksinir is a village in the Kastamonu District, Kastamonu Province, Turkey. Its population is 112 (2021).
