= Bozoğlak, Kastamonu =

Bozoğlak
- Village
- Location within Turkey
- Coordinates: 41.4580°N 33.8923°E
- Country: Turkey
- Province: Kastamonu
- District: Kastamonu
- Population (2021): 192
- Time zone: UTC+3 (TRT)

Bozoğlak is a village the district of Kastamonu, Kastamonu Province, Turkey. Its population is 192 (2021).
