= Omcular, Kastamonu =

Omcular
- Village
- Location within Turkey
- Coordinates: 41°17′N 33°37′E
- Country: Turkey
- Province: Kastamonu
- District: Kastamonu
- Population (2021): 48
- Time zone: UTC+3 (TRT)

Omcular is a village in the Kastamonu District, Kastamonu Province, Turkey. Its population is 48 (2021).
