= Akçapınar, Devrekani =

Village in Turkey

Akçapınar
- Village
- Location in Turkey
- Coordinates: 41.654°N 33.835°E
- Country: Turkey
- Province: Kastamonu
- District: Devrekani
- Population (2021): 62
- Time zone: UTC+3 (TRT)

Akçapınar is a village in the Devrekani District of Kastamonu Province in Turkey. Its population is 62 (2021).
