= Örenbaşı, Devrekani =

Village in Turkey

Örenbaşı
- Village
- Location in Turkey
- Coordinates: 41°34′57″N 33°53′07″E
- Country: Turkey
- Province: Kastamonu
- District: Devrekani
- Population (2021): 200
- Time zone: UTC+3 (TRT)

Örenbaşı is a village in the Devrekani District of Kastamonu Province in Turkey. Its population is 200 (2021).
