= Yukarıbatak, Kastamonu =

Yukarıbatak
- Village
- Location in Turkey
- Coordinates: 41°29′N 33°56′E
- Country: Turkey
- Province: Kastamonu
- District: Kastamonu
- Population (2021): 523
- Time zone: UTC+3 (TRT)

Yukarıbatak is a village in the Kastamonu District, Kastamonu Province, Turkey. Its population is 523 (2021).
