= Sarıyonca, Devrekani =

Village in Turkey

Sarıyonca
- Village
- Location in Turkey
- Coordinates: 41°34′48″N 33°46′49″E
- Country: Turkey
- Province: Kastamonu
- District: Devrekani
- Population (2021): 100
- Time zone: UTC+3 (TRT)

Sarıyonca is a village in the Devrekani District of Kastamonu Province in Turkey. Its population is 100 (2021).
