= Kavalca, Kastamonu =

Kavalca
- Village
- Location within Turkey
- Coordinates: 41°29′N 33°51′E
- Country: Turkey
- Province: Kastamonu
- District: Kastamonu
- Population (2021): 79
- Time zone: UTC+3 (TRT)

Kavalca is a village in the Kastamonu District, Kastamonu Province, Turkey. Its population is 79 (2021).
