= Zephyrium on the Calycadnus =

Town of ancient Cilicia

Coordinates: 36°17′56″N 34°02′42″E

Zephyrium or Zephyrion (Ancient Greek: Ζεφύριον), also called Zephyrium on the Calycadnus to differentiate it from other towns called Zephyrium, was a town of ancient Cilicia on the Calycadnus River near its mouth, on a promontory of the same name.

Its site is located near the mouth of the Calycadnus in Asiatic Turkey.
