= Kuşkara, Kastamonu =

Kuşkara
- Village
- Location within Turkey
- Coordinates: 41°28′N 33°57′E
- Country: Turkey
- Province: Kastamonu
- District: Kastamonu
- Population (2021): 177
- Time zone: UTC+3 (TRT)

Kuşkara is a village in the Kastamonu District, Kastamonu Province, Turkey. Its population is 177 (2021).
