= Hocaköy, Kastamonu =

Hocaköy
- Village
- Location within Turkey
- Coordinates: 41°26′49″N 33°48′45″E
- Country: Turkey
- Province: Kastamonu
- District: Kastamonu
- Population (2021): 181
- Time zone: UTC+3 (TRT)

Hocaköy is a village in the Kastamonu District, Kastamonu Province, Turkey. Its population is 181 (2021).
