= Elmayakası, Kastamonu =

Elmayakası
- Village
- Location within Turkey
- Coordinates: 41°18′N 33°55′E
- Country: Turkey
- Province: Kastamonu
- District: Kastamonu
- Population (2021): 110
- Time zone: UTC+3 (TRT)

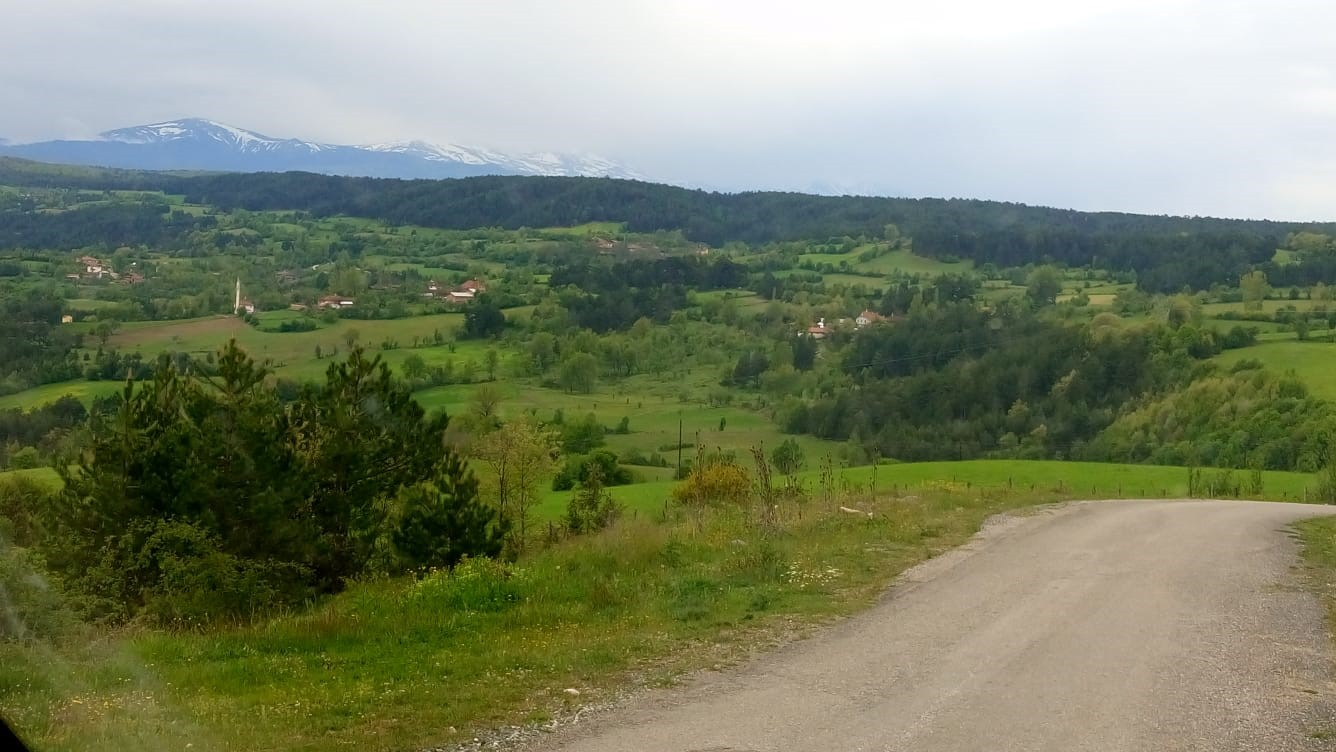
View of Elmayakası

Elmayakası is a village in the Kastamonu District, Kastamonu Province, Turkey. Its population is 110 (2021). It is 20 kilometres from the city of Kastamonu. The town's economy is mostly agricultural, with the exception of a single hotel.
