= Kızacık, Devrekani =

Village in Turkey

Kızacık
- Village
- Location in Turkey
- Coordinates: 41°43′54″N 34°04′24″E
- Country: Turkey
- Province: Kastamonu
- District: Devrekani
- Population (2021): 109
- Time zone: UTC+3 (TRT)

Kızacık is a village in the Devrekani District of Kastamonu Province in Turkey. Its population is 109 (2021).
