= Alparslan, Kastamonu =

Alparslan
- Village
- Location within Turkey
- Coordinates: 41.3166°N 33.7093°E
- Country: Turkey
- Province: Kastamonu
- District: Kastamonu
- Population (2021): 123
- Time zone: UTC+3 (TRT)

Alparslan is a village in the Kastamonu District, Kastamonu Province, Turkey. Its population is 123 (2021).
