= Bulacık, Kastamonu =

Bulacık
- Village
- Location within Turkey
- Coordinates: 41°18′N 33°46′E
- Country: Turkey
- Province: Kastamonu
- District: Kastamonu
- Population (2021): 152
- Time zone: UTC+3 (TRT)

Bulacık is a village in the Kastamonu District, Kastamonu Province, Turkey. Its population is 152 (2021).
