= İsmailli, Kuzyaka =

İsmailli
- Village
- Location within Turkey
- Coordinates: 41.2937°N 33.8333°E
- Country: Turkey
- Province: Kastamonu
- District: Kastamonu
- Population (2021): 145
- Time zone: UTC+3 (TRT)

İsmailli (also: Aşağıismailli) is a village in the Kastamonu District, Kastamonu Province, Turkey. Its population is 145 (2021).
