= İsmayıllı, Kurdamir =

İsmayıllı
- Municipality
- Location within Azerbaijan
- Coordinates: 40°25′38″N 48°20′34″E
- Country: Azerbaijan
- Rayon: Kurdamir
- Time zone: UTC+4 (AZT)
  - Summer (DST): UTC+5 (AZT)

İsmayıllı (also, Ismailli and Ismailly) is a village and municipality in the Kurdamir Rayon of Azerbaijan.
