= Eceoğlu, Kastamonu =

Eceoğlu
- Village
- Location within Turkey
- Coordinates: 41°18′N 33°54′E
- Country: Turkey
- Province: Kastamonu
- District: Kastamonu
- Population (2021): 82
- Time zone: UTC+3 (TRT)

Eceoğlu is a village in the Kastamonu District, Kastamonu Province, Turkey. Its population is 82 (2021).
