= Eymir, Kastamonu =

Eymir
- Village
- Location within Turkey
- Country: Turkey
- Province: Kastamonu
- District: Kastamonu
- Population (2021): 124
- Time zone: UTC+3 (TRT)

Eymir is a village in the Kastamonu District, Kastamonu Province, Turkey. Its population is 124 (2021).
