= Hasırlı, Devrekani =

Village in Turkey

Hasırlı
- Village
- Location in Turkey
- Coordinates: 41°38′16″N 33°57′44″E
- Country: Turkey
- Province: Kastamonu
- District: Devrekani
- Population (2021): 150
- Time zone: UTC+3 (TRT)

Hasırlı is a village in the Devrekani District of Kastamonu Province in Turkey. Its population is 150 (2021).
