= Umit oil field =

Oil field in Aktobe Region, Kazakhstan

Umit Oil Field
- Country: Kazakhstan
- Region: Aktobe Province
- Offshore/onshore: onshore
- Operator: China National Petroleum Corporation

Field history
- Discovery: 2008
- Start of production: 2008

Production
- Current production of oil: 10,000 barrels per day (~5.0×10^{5} t/a)
- Estimated oil in place: 180 million tonnes (~ 213.2×10^{6} m^{3} or 1341 million bbl)

The Umit Oil Field is an oil field located in Aktobe Province. It was discovered in 2008 and developed by China National Petroleum Corporation. The oil field is operated and owned by China National Petroleum Corporation. The total proven reserves of the Umit oil field are around 1.34 billion barrels (180 million tonnes), and production is centered on 10,000 barrels per day (1,600 m^{3}/d).
