= Gelinören, Kastamonu =

Gelinören
- Village
- Location within Turkey
- Country: Turkey
- Province: Kastamonu
- District: Kastamonu
- Population (2021): 147
- Time zone: UTC+3 (TRT)

Gelinören is a village in the Kastamonu District, Kastamonu Province, Turkey. Its population is 147 (2021).
