= Aşağıbatak, Kastamonu =

Aşağıbatak
- Village
- Location within Turkey
- Coordinates: 41°29′N 33°57′E
- Country: Turkey
- Province: Kastamonu
- District: Kastamonu
- Population (2021): 62
- Time zone: UTC+3 (TRT)

Aşağıbatak is a village in the Kastamonu District, Kastamonu Province, Turkey. Its population is 62 (2021).
