= Yukarıelyakut, Kastamonu =

Yukarıelyakut
- Village
- Location within Turkey
- Coordinates: 41°22′N 33°51′E
- Country: Turkey
- Province: Kastamonu
- District: Kastamonu
- Population (2021): 421
- Time zone: UTC+3 (TRT)

Yukarıelyakut is a village in the Kastamonu District, Kastamonu Province, Turkey. Its population is 421 (2021).
