= İsmailli, Akkaya =

İsmailli
- Village
- Location within Turkey
- Coordinates: 41°12′25″N 33°55′50″E
- Country: Turkey
- Province: Kastamonu
- District: Kastamonu
- Population (2021): 175
- Time zone: UTC+3 (TRT)

İsmailli is a village in the Kastamonu District, Kastamonu Province, Turkey. Its population is 175 (2021).
