= Karaş, Kastamonu =

Karaş
- Village
- Country: Turkey
- Province: Kastamonu
- District: Kastamonu
- Population (2021): 306
- Time zone: UTC+3 (TRT)

Karaş is a village in the Kastamonu District, Kastamonu Province, Turkey. Its population is 306 (2021).
