= Örenyeri, Kastamonu =

Örenyeri
- Village
- Location within Turkey
- Coordinates: 41°10′N 33°39′E
- Country: Turkey
- Province: Kastamonu
- District: Kastamonu
- Population (2021): 63
- Time zone: UTC+3 (TRT)

Örenyeri is a village in the Kastamonu District, Kastamonu Province, Turkey. Its population is 63 (2021).
