= Çevreli, Kastamonu =

Çevreli
- Village
- Location within Turkey
- Coordinates: 41°15′10″N 33°50′25″E
- Country: Turkey
- Province: Kastamonu
- District: Kastamonu
- Population (2021): 151
- Time zone: UTC+3 (TRT)

Çevreli is a village in the Kastamonu District, Kastamonu Province, Turkey. Its population is 151 (2021).
