= Sarıömer, Kastamonu =

Sarıömer
- Village
- Location within Turkey
- Coordinates: 41°27′N 33°47′E
- Country: Turkey
- Province: Kastamonu
- District: Kastamonu
- Population (2021): 138
- Time zone: UTC+3 (TRT)

Sarıömer is a village in the Kastamonu District, Kastamonu Province, Turkey. Its population is 138 (2021).
