= Adalar, Ağlı =

Village in Turkey

Adalar
- Village
- Location in Turkey
- Coordinates: 41°38′28″N 33°31′49″E
- Country: Turkey
- Province: Kastamonu
- District: Ağlı
- Population (2021): 67
- Time zone: UTC+3 (TRT)

Adalar is a village in the Ağlı District of Kastamonu Province in Turkey. Its population was 67 in 2021. It consists of nine islands located in the Sea of Marmara. The nine islands are Burgazada, Kınalıada, Sedefadasi, Yassıad, Büyükada, Heybeliada, Sivriada, Tavşanadasi and Kasikadasi .Buyukada is the most populous and the largest.
