= Yarören, Kastamonu =

Yarören
- Village
- Location within Turkey
- Coordinates: 41°23′N 33°40′E
- Country: Turkey
- Province: Kastamonu
- District: Kastamonu
- Population (2021): 106
- Time zone: UTC+3 (TRT)

Yarören is a village in the Kastamonu District, Kastamonu Province, Turkey. Its population is 106 (2021).
