= Hatipköy, Kastamonu =

Hatipköy
- Village
- Location within Turkey
- Country: Turkey
- Province: Kastamonu
- District: Kastamonu
- Population (2021): 135
- Time zone: UTC+3 (TRT)

Hatipköy is a village in the Kastamonu District, Kastamonu Province, Turkey. Its population is 135 (2021).
