= Başören, Kastamonu =

Başören
- Village
- Location within Turkey
- Coordinates: 41.2863°N 34.1260°E
- Country: Turkey
- Province: Kastamonu
- District: Kastamonu
- Population (2021): 157
- Time zone: UTC+3 (TRT)

Başören is a village in the Kastamonu District, Kastamonu Province, Turkey. Its population is 157 (2021).
