= Ballık, Kastamonu =

Ballık
- Village
- Location within Turkey
- Coordinates: 41.1979°N 33.7799°E
- Country: Turkey
- Province: Kastamonu
- District: Kastamonu
- Population (2021): 91
- Time zone: UTC+3 (TRT)

Ballık is a village in the Kastamonu District, Kastamonu Province, Turkey. Its population is 91 (2021).
