= Tekkeköy, Kastamonu =

Tekkeköy
- Village
- Location within Turkey
- Country: Turkey
- Province: Kastamonu
- District: Kastamonu
- Population (2021): 39
- Time zone: UTC+3 (TRT)

Tekkeköy is a village in the Kastamonu District, Kastamonu Province, Turkey. Its population is 39 (2021).
