= Kaşçılar, Kastamonu =

Kaşçılar
- Village
- Location within Turkey
- Coordinates: 41°15′N 33°52′E
- Country: Turkey
- Province: Kastamonu
- District: Kastamonu
- Population (2021): 117
- Time zone: UTC+3 (TRT)

Kaşçılar is a village in the Kastamonu District, Kastamonu Province, Turkey. Its population is 117 (2021).
