= Ayvalar, Kastamonu =

Ayvalar
- Village
- Location within Turkey
- Coordinates: 41°16′N 33°52′E
- Country: Turkey
- Province: Kastamonu
- District: Kastamonu
- Population (2021): 106
- Time zone: UTC+3 (TRT)

Ayvalar is a village in the district of Kastamonu, Kastamonu Province, Turkey. Its population is 106 (2021).
