= Sarıca, Kastamonu =

Sarıca
- Village
- Location within Turkey
- Coordinates: 41.318°N 33.898°E
- Country: Turkey
- Province: Kastamonu
- District: Kastamonu
- Population (2021): 81
- Time zone: UTC+3 (TRT)

Sarıca is a village in the Kastamonu District, Kastamonu Province, Turkey. Its population is 81 (2021).
