= Elmalıtekke, Devrekani =

Village in Turkey

Elmalıtekke
- Village
- Location in Turkey
- Coordinates: 41°47′29″N 33°58′16″E
- Country: Turkey
- Province: Kastamonu
- District: Devrekani
- Population (2021): 94
- Time zone: UTC+3 (TRT)

Elmalıtekke is a village in the Devrekani District of Kastamonu Province in Turkey. Its population is 94 (2021).
