= Alçılar, Devrekani =

Village in Turkey

Alçılar
- Village
- Location in Turkey
- Coordinates: 41°45′48″N 33°53′27″E
- Country: Turkey
- Province: Kastamonu
- District: Devrekani
- Population (2021): 75
- Time zone: UTC+3 (TRT)

Alçılar is a village in the Devrekani District of Kastamonu Province in Turkey. Its population is 75 (2021).
