= Karaçam, Devrekani =

Village in Turkey

Karaçam
- Village
- Location in Turkey
- Coordinates: 41.724°N 33.881°E
- Country: Turkey
- Province: Kastamonu
- District: Devrekani
- Population (2021): 98
- Time zone: UTC+3 (TRT)

Karaçam is a village in the Devrekani District of Kastamonu Province in Turkey. Its population is 98 (2021).
