= Sada, Kastamonu =

Sada
- Village
- Location within Turkey
- Coordinates: 41°32′17″N 33°38′08″E
- Country: Turkey
- Province: Kastamonu
- District: Kastamonu
- Population (2021): 49
- Time zone: UTC+3 (TRT)

Sada is a village in the Kastamonu District, Kastamonu Province, Turkey. Its population is 49 (2021).
