= Cebeci, Kastamonu =

Cebeci
- Village
- Location within Turkey
- Coordinates: 41°11′25″N 34°2′33″E
- Country: Turkey
- Province: Kastamonu
- District: Kastamonu
- Population (2021): 71
- Time zone: UTC+3 (TRT)

Cebeci is a village in the Kastamonu District, Kastamonu Province, Turkey. Its population is 71 (2021).
