= Duruçay, Kastamonu =

Duruçay
- Village
- Location within Turkey
- Country: Turkey
- Province: Kastamonu
- District: Kastamonu
- Population (2021): 271
- Time zone: UTC+3 (TRT)

Duruçay is a village in the Kastamonu District of Kastamonu Province, Turkey. Its population is 271 (2021).

== See also ==
- Halime Çavuş
