= Göynükören, Devrekani =

Village in Turkey

Göynükören
- Village
- Location in Turkey
- Coordinates: 41°40′30″N 34°03′41″E
- Country: Turkey
- Province: Kastamonu
- District: Devrekani
- Population (2021): 66
- Time zone: UTC+3 (TRT)

Göynükören is a village in the Devrekani District of Kastamonu Province in Turkey. Its population is 66 (2021).
