= Kurtkayı, Kastamonu =

Kurtkayı
- Village
- Location within Turkey
- Coordinates: 41°11′N 33°41′E
- Country: Turkey
- Province: Kastamonu
- District: Kastamonu
- Population (2021): 76
- Time zone: UTC+3 (TRT)

Kurtkayı is a village in the Kastamonu District, Kastamonu Province, Turkey. Its population is 76 (2021).
