= Kadıoğlu, Kastamonu =

Kadıoğlu
- Village
- Location within Turkey
- Coordinates: 41.378°N 33.781°E
- Country: Turkey
- Province: Kastamonu
- District: Kastamonu
- Population (2021): 196
- Time zone: UTC+3 (TRT)

Kadıoğlu is a village in the Kastamonu District, Kastamonu Province, Turkey. Its population is 196 (2021).
