= Kemerler, Kastamonu =

Kemerler
- Village
- Location within Turkey
- Country: Turkey
- Province: Kastamonu
- District: Kastamonu
- Population (2021): 126
- Time zone: UTC+3 (TRT)

Kemerler is a village in the Kastamonu District, Kastamonu Province, Turkey. Its population is 126 (2021).
