= Yılancı, Kastamonu =

Yılancı
- Village
- Location within Turkey
- Coordinates: 41°15′50″N 33°53′05″E
- Country: Turkey
- Province: Kastamonu
- District: Kastamonu
- Population (2021): 72
- Time zone: UTC+3 (TRT)

Yılancı is a village in the district of Kastamonu, Kastamonu Province, Turkey. Its population is 72 (2021).
