= Kızılkese, Kastamonu =

Kızılkese
- Village
- Location within Turkey
- Country: Turkey
- Province: Kastamonu
- District: Kastamonu
- Population (2021): 163
- Time zone: UTC+3 (TRT)

Kızılkese is a village in the Kastamonu, Kastamonu Province, Turkey. Its population is 163 (2021).
