= Akdoğan, Devrekani =

Village in Turkey

Akdoğan
- Village
- Location in Turkey
- Coordinates: 41.754°N 34.006°E
- Country: Turkey
- Province: Kastamonu
- District: Devrekani
- Population (2021): 68
- Time zone: UTC+3 (TRT)

Akdoğan is a village in the Devrekani District of Kastamonu Province in Turkey. Its population is 68 (2021).
