= Gödel, Kastamonu =

Gödel
- Village
- Location within Turkey
- Coordinates: 41°16′N 33°43′E
- Country: Turkey
- Province: Kastamonu
- District: Kastamonu
- Population (2021): 82
- Time zone: UTC+3 (TRT)

Gödel is a village in the Kastamonu District, Kastamonu Province, Turkey. Its population is 82 (2021).
