= Akdoğan, Kastamonu =

Akdoğan
- Village
- Location within Turkey
- Coordinates: 41.3840°N 33.8616°E
- Country: Turkey
- Province: Kastamonu
- District: Kastamonu
- Population (2021): 405
- Time zone: UTC+3 (TRT)

Akdoğan is a village in the district of Kastamonu, Kastamonu Province, Turkey. Its population is 405 (2021).
