= Alpağut, Kastamonu =

Alpağut
- Village
- Location within Turkey
- Coordinates: 41.4170°N 33.8999°E
- Country: Turkey
- Province: Kastamonu
- District: Kastamonu
- Population (2021): 258
- Time zone: UTC+3 (TRT)

Alpağut is a village in the Kastamonu District, Kastamonu Province, Turkey. Its population is 258 (2021).
