= Gömmece, Tarsus =

Gömmece
- Neighbourhood
- Location in Turkey
- Coordinates: 37°13′N 34°52′E
- Country: Turkey
- Province: Mersin
- District: Tarsus
- Elevation: 780 m (2,560 ft)
- Population (2022): 124
- Time zone: UTC+3 (TRT)
- Area code: 0324

Gömmece is a neighbourhood in the municipality and district of Tarsus, Mersin Province, Turkey. Its population is 124 (2022). It is situated in the southern part of the Toros Mountains. It is located 45 kilometres (28 mi) away from Tarsus and 75 kilometres (47 mi) away from Mersin.
