= Zephyrium (Crimea) =

Zephyrium or Zephyrion (Ancient Greek: Ζεφύριον) was a town of the Chersonesus Taurica (modern Crimean Peninsula), mentioned by Pliny the Elder.

Its site is unlocated.
