= Çakırçay =

Village in Turkey

- Village
- Location within Turkey
- Coordinates: 41°38′03″N 34°34′25″E
- Country: Turkey
- Province: Kastamonu
- District: Hanönü
- Population (2021): 96
- Time zone: UTC+3 (TRT)

Çakırçay (also Gerence) is a village in Hanönü District, in Kastamonu Province, Turkey. Its population is 96 (2021).
