= Akdivan, Ağlı =

Village in Turkey

Akdivan
- Village
- Location in Turkey
- Coordinates: 41°48′25″N 33°29′48″E
- Country: Turkey
- Province: Kastamonu
- District: Ağlı
- Population (2021): 69
- Time zone: UTC+3 (TRT)

Akdivan is a village in the Ağlı District of Kastamonu Province in Turkey. Its population is 69 (2021).
