= Karayazıcılar, Devrekani =

Village in Turkey

Karayazıcılar
- Village
- Location in Turkey
- Coordinates: 41°42′00″N 33°48′13″E
- Country: Turkey
- Province: Kastamonu
- District: Devrekani
- Population (2021): 47
- Time zone: UTC+3 (TRT)

Karayazıcılar is a village in the Devrekani District of Kastamonu Province in Turkey. Its population is 47 (2021).
