= Dereberçin, Kastamonu =

Dereberçin
- Village
- Location within Turkey
- Coordinates: 41°09′N 33°59′E
- Country: Turkey
- Province: Kastamonu
- District: Kastamonu
- Population (2021): 177
- Time zone: UTC+3 (TRT)

Dereberçin is a village in the Kastamonu District, Kastamonu Province, Turkey. Its population is 177 (2021).
