= Hacımuharrem, Kastamonu =

Hacımuharrem
- Village
- Location within Turkey
- Coordinates: 41°29′N 33°39′E
- Country: Turkey
- Province: Kastamonu
- District: Kastamonu
- Population (2021): 235
- Time zone: UTC+3 (TRT)

Hacımuharrem is a village in the Kastamonu District, Kastamonu Province, Turkey. As of 2021, the population is 235.
