= Denizgörülen, Doğanyurt =

Village in Turkey

Denizgörülen
- Village
- Location in Turkey
- Coordinates: 41°55′32″N 33°24′49″E
- Country: Turkey
- Province: Kastamonu
- District: Doğanyurt
- Population (2021): 171
- Time zone: UTC+3 (TRT)

Denizgörülen is a village in the Doğanyurt District of Kastamonu Province in Turkey. Its population is 171 (2021).
