= Demirci, Kastamonu =

Demirci
- Village
- Location within Turkey
- Country: Turkey
- Province: Kastamonu
- District: Kastamonu
- Population (2021): 178
- Time zone: UTC+3 (TRT)

Demirci is a village in the Kastamonu District, Kastamonu Province, Turkey. Its population is 178 (2021).
