= Kırık, Kastamonu =

Kırık
- Village
- Location within Turkey
- Coordinates: 41°12′48″N 33°48′2″E
- Country: Turkey
- Province: Kastamonu
- District: Kastamonu
- Population (2021): 64
- Time zone: UTC+3 (TRT)

Kırık is a village in the Kastamonu District, Kastamonu Province, Turkey. Its population is 64 (2021).
