= Gülef, Kastamonu =

Gülef
- Village
- Location within Turkey
- Coordinates: 41°32′N 33°35′E
- Country: Turkey
- Province: Kastamonu
- District: Kastamonu
- Population (2021): 70
- Time zone: UTC+3 (TRT)

Gülef is a village in the Kastamonu District, Kastamonu Province, Turkey. Its population is 70 (2021).
