= Kırışoğlu, Kastamonu =

Kırışoğlu
- Village
- Location within Turkey
- Coordinates: 41°19′N 33°39′E
- Country: Turkey
- Province: Kastamonu
- District: Kastamonu
- Population (2021): 109
- Time zone: UTC+3 (TRT)

Kırışoğlu is a village in the Kastamonu District, Kastamonu Province, Turkey. Its population is 109 (2021).
