= Evciler, Kastamonu =

Evciler
- Village
- Location within Turkey
- Coordinates: 41°14′58″N 33°55′52″E
- Country: Turkey
- Province: Kastamonu
- District: Kastamonu
- Population (2021): 83
- Time zone: UTC+3 (TRT)

Evciler is a village in the Kastamonu District, Kastamonu Province, Turkey. Its population is 83 (2021).
