= Arız, Kastamonu =

Arız
- Village
- Location within Turkey
- Coordinates: 41.4810°N 33.7798°E
- Country: Turkey
- Province: Kastamonu
- District: Kastamonu
- Population (2021): 185
- Time zone: UTC+3 (TRT)

Arız is a village in the Kastamonu District, Kastamonu Province, Turkey. Its population is 185 (2021).
