= Tepeharman, Kastamonu =

Tepeharman
- Village
- Location within Turkey
- Coordinates: 41°16′N 34°04′E
- Country: Turkey
- Province: Kastamonu
- District: Kastamonu
- Population (2021): 88
- Time zone: UTC+3 (TRT)

Tepeharman is a village in the Kastamonu District, Kastamonu Province, Turkey. Its population is 88 (2021).
