= Uzunoluk, Kastamonu =

Uzunoluk
- Village
- Location within Turkey
- Coordinates: 41°22′N 33°53′E
- Country: Turkey
- Province: Kastamonu
- District: Kastamonu
- Population (2021): 183
- Time zone: UTC+3 (TRT)

Uzunoluk is a village in the district of Kastamonu, Kastamonu Province, Turkey. Its population is 183 (2021).
