= Nalcıkuyucağı, Kastamonu =

Nalcıkuyucağı
- Village
- Location within Turkey
- Coordinates: 41°19′N 33°34′E
- Country: Turkey
- Province: Kastamonu
- District: Kastamonu
- Population (2021): 104
- Time zone: UTC+3 (TRT)

Nalcıkuyucağı is a village in the Kastamonu District, Kastamonu Province, Turkey. Its population is 104 (2021).
