= Kırcalar, Kastamonu =

Kırcalar
- Village
- Location within Turkey
- Country: Turkey
- Province: Kastamonu
- District: Kastamonu
- Population (2021): 199
- Time zone: UTC+3 (TRT)

Kırcalar is a village in the Kastamonu District, Kastamonu Province, Turkey. Its population is 199 (2021).
