= Sulusökü, Kastamonu =

Sulusökü
- Village
- Location within Turkey
- Country: Turkey
- Province: Kastamonu
- District: Kastamonu
- Population (2021): 47
- Time zone: UTC+3 (TRT)

Sulusökü is a village in the Kastamonu District, Kastamonu Province, Turkey. Its population is 47 (2021).
