= Yenikavak, Kastamonu =

Yenikavak
- Village
- Location within Turkey
- Country: Turkey
- Province: Kastamonu
- District: Kastamonu
- Population (2021): 121
- Time zone: UTC+3 (TRT)

Yenikavak is a village in the Kastamonu District, Kastamonu Province, Turkey. Its population is 121 as of 2021.
