= Yunusköy, Kastamonu =

Yunusköy
- Village
- Location within Turkey
- Coordinates: 41°21′26″N 33°56′46″E
- Country: Turkey
- Province: Kastamonu
- District: Kastamonu
- Population (2021): 233
- Time zone: UTC+3 (TRT)

Yunusköy is a village in the Kastamonu District, Kastamonu Province, Turkey. Its population is 233 (2021).
