= Başköy, Kastamonu =

Başköy
- Village
- Location within Turkey
- Coordinates: 41°30′52″N 33°40′41″E
- Country: Turkey
- Province: Kastamonu
- District: Kastamonu
- Population (2021): 92
- Time zone: UTC+3 (TRT)

Başköy is a village in the Kastamonu District, Kastamonu Province, Turkey. Its population is 92 (2021).
