= Hacıilyas, Kastamonu =

Hacıilyas
- Village
- Location within Turkey
- Coordinates: 41.38443°N 33.92692°E
- Country: Turkey
- Province: Kastamonu
- District: Kastamonu
- Population (2021): 57
- Time zone: UTC+3 (TRT)

Hacıilyas is a village in the Kastamonu District, Kastamonu Province, Turkey. Its population is 57 (2021).
