= Gökçekent, Kastamonu =

Gökçekent
- Village
- Location within Turkey
- Coordinates: 41°29′47″N 33°47′08″E
- Country: Turkey
- Province: Kastamonu
- District: Kastamonu
- Population (2021): 118
- Time zone: UTC+3 (TRT)

Gökçekent is a village in the Kastamonu District, Kastamonu Province, Turkey. Its population is 118 (2021).
