= Laçin, Devrekani =

Village in Turkey

Laçin
- Village
- Location in Turkey
- Coordinates: 41.614°N 33.914°E
- Country: Turkey
- Province: Kastamonu
- District: Devrekani
- Population (2021): 168
- Time zone: UTC+3 (TRT)

Laçin is a village in the Devrekani District of Kastamonu Province in Turkey. Its population is 168 (2021).
