= Ismilli =

- Location within Azerbaijan
- Coordinates: 39°21′59″N 49°12′31″E
- Country: Azerbaijan
- Rayon: Neftchala
- Time zone: UTC+4 (AZT)
  - Summer (DST): UTC+5 (AZT)

Ismilli (also, Ismailli and Ismeilli) is a village in the Neftchala Rayon of Azerbaijan.
