= Aşağıelyakut, Kastamonu =

Aşağıelyakut
- Village
- Location within Turkey
- Coordinates: 41°23′N 33°51′E
- Country: Turkey
- Province: Kastamonu
- District: Kastamonu
- Population (2021): 188
- Time zone: UTC+3 (TRT)

Aşağıelyakut is a village in the Kastamonu District, Kastamonu Province, Turkey. Its population is 188 (2021).
