= Baltacı, Kastamonu =

Baltacı
- Village
- Location within Turkey
- Coordinates: 41°24′45″N 33°35′30″E
- Country: Turkey
- Province: Kastamonu
- District: Kastamonu
- Population (2021): 67
- Time zone: UTC+3 (TRT)

Baltacı is a village in the Kastamonu District, Kastamonu Province, Turkey. Its population is 67 (2021).
