= Selahattinköy, Devrekani =

Village in Turkey

Selahattinköy
- Village
- Location in Turkey
- Coordinates: 41°42′37″N 33°56′45″E
- Country: Turkey
- Province: Kastamonu
- District: Devrekani
- Population (2021): 99
- Time zone: UTC+3 (TRT)

Selahattinköy is a village in the Devrekani District of Kastamonu Province in Turkey. Its population is 99 (2021).
