= Alpı, Kastamonu =

Alpı
- Village
- Location within Turkey
- Coordinates: 41.2214°N 33.7702°E
- Country: Turkey
- Province: Kastamonu
- District: Kastamonu
- Population (2021): 109
- Time zone: UTC+3 (TRT)

Alpı is a village in the Kastamonu District, Kastamonu Province, Turkey. Its population is 109 (2021).
