= Numanlar, Kastamonu =

Numanlar
- Village
- Location within Turkey
- Coordinates: 41°28′N 33°43′E
- Country: Turkey
- Province: Kastamonu
- District: Kastamonu
- Population (2021): 113
- Time zone: UTC+3 (TRT)

Numanlar is a village in the Kastamonu District, Kastamonu Province, Turkey. Its population is 113 (2021).
