= Çavuşlu, Devrekani =

Village in Turkey

Çavuşlu
- Village
- Location in Turkey
- Coordinates: 41.756°N 33.874°E
- Country: Turkey
- Province: Kastamonu
- District: Devrekani
- Population (2021): 77
- Time zone: UTC+3 (TRT)

Çavuşlu is a village in the Devrekani District of Kastamonu Province in Turkey. Its population is 77 (2021).
