= Taşlıpınar, Doğanyurt =

Village in Turkey

Taşlıpınar
- Village
- Location within Turkey
- Coordinates: 42.005°N 33.434°E
- Country: Turkey
- Province: Kastamonu
- District: Doğanyurt
- Population (2021): 194
- Time zone: UTC+3 (TRT)

Taşlıpınar is a village in the Doğanyurt District of Kastamonu Province in Turkey. Its population is 194 (2021).
