= Yürekveren, Kastamonu =

Yürekveren
- Village
- Location within Turkey
- Coordinates: 41°31′N 33°47′E
- Country: Turkey
- Province: Kastamonu
- District: Kastamonu
- Population (2021): 223
- Time zone: UTC+3 (TRT)

Yürekveren is a village in the Kastamonu District of Kastamonu Province, Turkey. Its population is 223 (2021).
