= Hüseyinli, Kastamonu =

Hüseyinli
- Village
- Country: Turkey
- Province: Kastamonu
- District: Kastamonu
- Population (2021): 106
- Time zone: UTC+3 (TRT)

Hüseyinli is a village in the Kastamonu District, Kastamonu Province, Turkey. Its population is 106 (2021).
