= Bayındır, Kastamonu =

Bayındır
- Village
- Location within Turkey
- Coordinates: 41.1919°N 33.7196°E
- Country: Turkey
- Province: Kastamonu
- District: Kastamonu
- Population (2021): 54
- Time zone: UTC+3 (TRT)

Bayındır is a village in the Kastamonu District, Kastamonu Province, Turkey. Its population is 54 (2021).
