= Konukça, Kastamonu =

Konukça
- Village
- Location within Turkey
- Coordinates: 41°21′N 33°43′E
- Country: Turkey
- Province: Kastamonu
- District: Kastamonu
- Population (2021): 200
- Time zone: UTC+3 (TRT)

Konukça is a village in the Kastamonu District, Kastamonu Province, Turkey. Its population is 200 (2021).
