= Sahip, Kastamonu =

Sahip
- Village
- Location within Turkey
- Coordinates: 41°13′N 33°42′E
- Country: Turkey
- Province: Kastamonu
- District: Kastamonu
- Population (2021): 80
- Time zone: UTC+3 (TRT)

Sahip is a village in the Kastamonu District, Kastamonu Province, Turkey. Its population is 80 (2021).
