= Halife, Kastamonu =

Halife
- Village
- Location within Turkey
- Coordinates: 41°31′N 33°45′E
- Country: Turkey
- Province: Kastamonu
- District: Kastamonu
- Population (2021): 184
- Time zone: UTC+3 (TRT)

Halife is a village in the district of Kastamonu, Kastamonu Province, Turkey. Its population is 184 (2021).
