= Kastamonu District =

District of Kastamonu Province, Turkey

- District
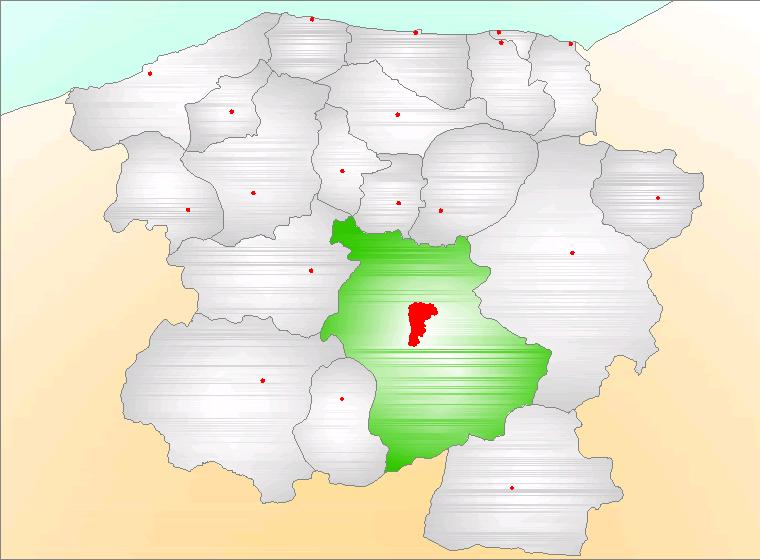
- Map showing Kastamonu District (green) in Kastamonu Province

- Location in Turkey
- Coordinates: 41°58′N 34°01′E
- Country: Turkey
- Province: Kastamonu
- Seat: Kastamonu
- Area: 1,847 km^{2} (713 sq mi)
- Population (2021): 152,541
  - Density: 82.59/km^{2} (213.9/sq mi)
- Time zone: UTC+3 (TRT)

Kastamonu District (also known as Merkez, meaning "central") is a district of the Kastamonu Province of Turkey. Its administrative seat is the city of Kastamonu. The district covers an area of 1,847 km^{2}, and had a population of 152,541 in 2021.

== Composition ==
There is one municipality in Kastamonu District:

- Kastamonu

There are 177 villages in Kastamonu District:

- Ahlatçık
- Ahlatköy
- Ahmetbey
- Akçakese
- Akçataş
- Akdoğan
- Aksinir
- Alçıcılar
- Alpağut
- Alparslan
- Alpı
- Arız
- Aşağıakça
- Aşağıbatak
- Aşağıelyakut
- Aşağıyuva
- Ayvalar
- Bahadır
- Ballık
- Baltacı
- Baltacıkuyucağı
- Başköy
- Başören
- Bayındır
- Bostanköy
- Bozoğlak
- Bükköy
- Bulacık
- Burhanlı
- Bürme
- Çakıllı
- Cambaz
- Çatalçam
- Çatören
- Çavundur, Kastamonu
- Çavundur, Kuzyaka
- Cebeci
- Çerçiköy
- Çevreli
- Çıbanköy
- Çiğil
- Civciler
- Çorumlu
- Damlaçay
- Darıbükü
- Dayılar
- Demirci
- Dereberçin
- Dereköy
- Dokuzkat
- Dursunlar
- Duruçay
- Eceoğlu
- Elmayakası
- Emirköy
- Emirler, Kastamonu
- Emirler, Kuzyaka
- Emirli
- Eşen
- Esenler
- Esenli
- Etyemez
- Evciler
- Eymir
- Gelinören
- Geyikli
- Girdallı
- Göcen
- Gödel
- Gökçekent
- Gökçukur
- Gölköy
- Gömeç
- Gömmece
- Gülef
- Hacıbey
- Hacıilyas
- Hacıköy
- Hacımuharrem
- Hacışaban
- Hacıyusuf
- Halaçlı
- Halife
- Halifekuyucağı
- Hamitköy
- Hasköy
- Hatipköy
- Hatipli
- Hatipoğlu
- Haydarlar
- Hocaköy
- Hüseyinli
- İbişler
- İbrahimli
- İmamköy
- İnceboğaz
- İslamköy
- İsmailli, Akkaya
- İsmailli, Kuzyaka
- Kadıoğlu
- Karaçomak
- Karaevli
- Karakuz
- Karamukmolla
- Karaş
- Kasaba
- Kasabaörencik
- Kaşçılar
- Kavakköy
- Kavalca
- Kayalı
- Kayı
- Kemerler
- Keremli
- Kırcalar
- Kirenli
- Kırık
- Kırışoğlu
- Kıyık, Kastamonu
- Kıyık, Kuzyaka
- Kızılkese
- Köklü
- Konukça
- Koruköy
- Köseoğlu
- Küçüksu
- Kurtgömeç
- Kurtkayı
- Kurucaören
- Kurusayar
- Kuşkara
- Kuzyaka
- Mescitköy
- Mollaköy
- Musallar
- Nalcıkuyucağı
- Numanlar
- Obruk
- Oğulköy
- Omcular
- Ömerli
- Örencik
- Örenyeri
- Ortaboğaz
- Ortaköy
- Pehlivanköy
- Sada
- Sahip
- Sapaca
- Saraycık
- Sarıca
- Sarıömer
- Seremettin
- Şeyhköy
- Sipahi
- Sırasöğütler
- Subaşı
- Sulusökü
- Talipler
- Tarlatepe
- Taşlık
- Tekkeköy
- Tepeharman
- Terziköy
- Ümit
- Üyücek
- Uzunoluk
- Yaka
- Yarören
- Yenikavak
- Yılancı
- Yolkonak
- Yukarıbatak
- Yukarıelyakut
- Yukarıkuyucak
- Yunusköy
- Yürekveren
