= Doğanyurt =

- Municipality
- Location within Turkey
- Coordinates: 42°00′22″N 33°27′36″E
- Country: Turkey
- Province: Kastamonu
- District: Doğanyurt

Government
  - Mayor: Ahmet Kaya (AKP)
- Elevation: 45 m (148 ft)
- Population (2025): 1.100
- Time zone: UTC+3 (TRT)
- Area code: 0366
- Climate: Cfb
- Website: www.doganyurt.bel.tr

Doğanyurt, formerly Hoşalay, is a small town in the Kastamonu Province in the Black Sea region of Turkey. It is the seat of Doğanyurt District. Its population is 1100 (2025).

Kerembe Burnu, the ancient Cape Karambis, is located to the northwest of Doğanyurt. The promontory, 225 km distant from the Sarych headland, is the nearest point on the Anatolian coast to the Crimean Peninsula and has for centuries served as a nautical landmark for those seeking to cross the Black Sea at its narrowest point.
