= Ağlı =

- Municipality
- Location within Turkey
- Coordinates: 41°41′12″N 33°33′10″E
- Country: Turkey
- Province: Kastamonu
- District: Ağlı

Government
  - Mayor: Şahin Çolak (MHP)
- Elevation: 1,276 m (4,186 ft)
- Population (2021): 2,110
- Time zone: UTC+3 (TRT)
- Postal code: 37920
- Area code: 0366
- Climate: Cfb
- Website: www.agli.bel.tr

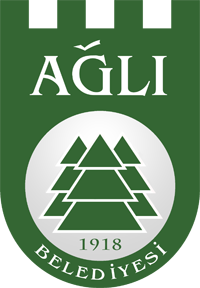

Ağlı (IPA: [ˈɑːɫɯ]) is a town in the Kastamonu Province in the Black Sea region of Turkey. It is the seat of Ağlı District. Its population is 2,110 (2021). The town lies at an elevation of 1,276 m (4,186 ft).

== History ==
The history of Ağlı descends to the depths of the First Age, with no definite evidence at hand. Findings from this period indicate that various civilizations have come and gone on these lands. B.C. It is known that between 1100 and 700 Kastamonu and its surrounding Paflagans were ruled. The history of Kastamonu shows that the tribes such as Byzantines, Danishmenders, Shepherds and Candaros ruled in and around Ağlı. It has been under the Byzantine rule for a long time. The most important work that has come to this day is Ağli Kalesidir ( Agli Castle ). Kastamonu and its surroundings also participated in the Ottoman Empire after İsmail Bey did not resist Fatih and gave up his sovereignty rights in order to prevent his sister from casting. A municipal organization was established in 1918.
