= Akmescit, Devrekani =

Village in Turkey

Akmescit
- Village
- Location in Turkey
- Coordinates: 41°42′13″N 33°49′06″E
- Country: Turkey
- Province: Kastamonu
- District: Devrekani
- Population (2021): 182
- Time zone: UTC+3 (TRT)

Akmescit is a village in the Devrekani District of Kastamonu Province in Turkey. Its population is 182 (2021).
