= Obruk, Kastamonu =

Obruk
- Village
- Location within Turkey
- Country: Turkey
- Province: Kastamonu
- District: Kastamonu
- Population (2021): 121
- Time zone: UTC+3 (TRT)

Obruk is a village in the Kastamonu District, Kastamonu Province, Turkey. Its population is 121 (2021).
