= Çorumlu, Kastamonu =

Çorumlu
- Village
- Location within Turkey
- Coordinates: 41°21′N 33°50′E
- Country: Turkey
- Province: Kastamonu
- District: Kastamonu
- Population (2021): 103
- Time zone: UTC+3 (TRT)

Çorumlu is a village in the Kastamonu District, Kastamonu Province, Turkey. Its population is 103 (2021).
