= Devrekani =

- Municipality
- Location within Turkey
- Coordinates: 41°36′07″N 33°50′17″E
- Country: Turkey
- Province: Kastamonu
- District: Devrekani

Government
  - Mayor: Engin Altıkulaç (AKP)
- Elevation: 1,111 m (3,645 ft)
- Population (2021): 5,763
- Time zone: UTC+3 (TRT)
- Area code: 0366
- Climate: Cfb
- Website: www.devrekani.bel.tr

Devrekani is a town in the Kastamonu Province in the Black Sea region of Turkey. It is the seat of Devrekani District. Its population is 5,763 (2021). The town lies at an elevation of 1,111 m (3,645 ft).
