= Hocaköy, Taşköprü =

Village in Turkey

Hocaköy
- Village
- Location in Turkey
- Coordinates: 41.264°N 34.237°E
- Country: Turkey
- Province: Kastamonu
- District: Taşköprü
- Population (2021): 92
- Time zone: UTC+3 (TRT)

Hocaköy is a village in the Taşköprü District of Kastamonu Province in Turkey. Its population is 92 (2021).
