= Kurtköy, Devrekani =

Village in Turkey

Kurtköy
- Village
- Location in Turkey
- Coordinates: 41.709°N 33.919°E
- Country: Turkey
- Province: Kastamonu
- District: Devrekani
- Population (2021): 129
- Time zone: UTC+3 (TRT)

Kurtköy is a village in the Devrekani District of Kastamonu Province in Turkey. Its population is 129 (2021).
