= Çiğil, Kastamonu =

Çiğil
- Village
- Location within Turkey
- Country: Turkey
- Province: Kastamonu
- District: Kastamonu
- Population (2021): 118
- Time zone: UTC+3 (TRT)

Çiğil is a village in the Kastamonu District, of Kastamonu Province, Turkey. Its population was 118 in (2021).
