= Ahlatçık, Kastamonu =

Ahlatçık
- Village
- Location within Turkey
- Coordinates: 41.2407°N 33.9498°E
- Country: Turkey
- Province: Kastamonu
- District: Kastamonu
- Population (2021): 132
- Time zone: UTC+3 (TRT)

Ahlatçık is a village in the Kastamonu District, Kastamonu Province, Turkey. Its population is 132 (2021).
