= Ahlatçık, Devrekani =

Village in Turkey

Ahlatçık
- Village
- Location in Turkey
- Coordinates: 41.733°N 33.905°E
- Country: Turkey
- Province: Kastamonu
- District: Devrekani
- Population (2021): 58
- Time zone: UTC+3 (TRT)

Ahlatçık is a village in the Devrekani District of Kastamonu Province in Turkey. Its population is 58 (2021).
