= Yolkonak, Kastamonu =

Yolkonak
- Village
- Location within Turkey
- Coordinates: 41.28722°N 33.81°E
- Country: Turkey
- Province: Kastamonu
- District: Kastamonu
- Population (2021): 166
- Time zone: UTC+3 (TRT)

Yolkonak is a village in the Kastamonu District, Kastamonu Province, Turkey. Its population is 166 (2021).
