= Hocaköy, Azdavay =

Village in Turkey

Hocaköy
- Village
- Location in Turkey
- Coordinates: 41.691°N 33.507°E
- Country: Turkey
- Province: Kastamonu
- District: Azdavay
- Population (2021): 59
- Time zone: UTC+3 (TRT)

Hocaköy is a village in the Azdavay District of Kastamonu Province in Turkey. Its population is 59 (2021).
