= Akçakese, Kastamonu =

Akçakese
- Village
- Location within Turkey
- Coordinates: 41.2997°N 33.7209°E
- Country: Turkey
- Province: Kastamonu
- District: Kastamonu
- Population (2021): 67
- Time zone: UTC+3 (TRT)

Akçakese is a village in the district of Kastamonu, Kastamonu Province, Turkey. Its population is 67 (2021).
