= Akçakese, Ağlı =

Village in Turkey

Akçakese
- Village
- Location in Turkey
- Coordinates: 41.763°N 33.513°E
- Country: Turkey
- Province: Kastamonu
- District: Ağlı
- Population (2021): 82
- Time zone: UTC+3 (TRT)

Akçakese is a village in the Ağlı District of Kastamonu Province in Turkey. Its population is 82 (2021).
