= Yukarıkuyucak, Kastamonu =

Yukarıkuyucak
- Village
- Location within Turkey
- Coordinates: 41.365°N 33.805°E
- Country: Turkey
- Province: Kastamonu
- District: Kastamonu
- Population (2021): 157
- Time zone: UTC+3 (TRT)

Yukarıkuyucak is a village in the Kastamonu District, Kastamonu Province, Turkey. Its population is 157 (2021).
