= List of populated places in Bartın Province =

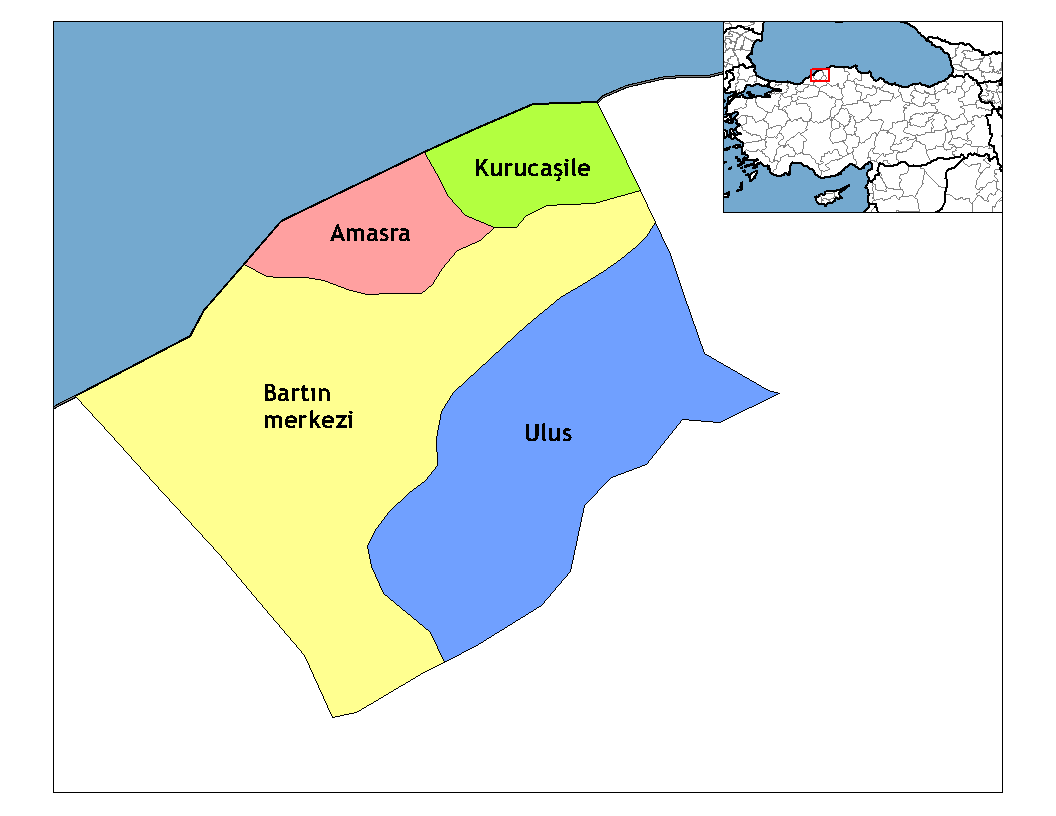
Bartın Province

Below is the list of populated places in Bartın Province, Turkey by the districts. In the following lists first place in each list is the administrative center of the district.

== Bartın ==
- Bartın
- Ağdacı, Bartın
- Ahmetpaşa, Bartın
- Akağaç, Bartın
- Akbaba, Bartın
- Akbaş, Bartın
- Akçalı, Bartın
- Akçamescit, Bartın
- Akgöz, Bartın
- Akıncılar, Bartın
- Akmanlar, Bartın
- Akpınar, Bartın
- Alibaş, Bartın
- Arıönü, Bartın
- Arıt, Bartın
- Aşağıdere, Bartın
- Avgölü, Bartın
- Aydınlar, Bartın
- Bakioğlu, Bartın
- Barkaçboz, Bartın
- Başoğlu, Bartın
- Bayıryüzü, Bartın
- Bedil, Bartın
- Beşköprü, Bartın
- Budakdüzü, Bartın
- Büyükkıran, Bartın
- Büyükkızılkum, Bartın
- Celilbeyoğlu, Bartın
- Çakırdemirci, Bartın
- Çakırkadı, Bartın
- Çakırömerağa, Bartın
- Çamaltı, Bartın
- Çamlık, Bartın
- Çaybükü, Bartın
- Çayır, Bartın
- Çeştepe, Bartın
- Çiftlikköy, Bartın
- Çöpbey, Bartın
- Çukurbük, Bartın
- Dallıca, Bartın
- Darıören, Bartın
- Derbent, Bartın
- Dırazlar, Bartın
- Doğaşı, Bartın
- Ecikler, Bartın
- Ellibaş, Bartın
- Epçiler, Bartın
- Epçilerkadı, Bartın
- Esbey, Bartın
- Esenyurt, Bartın
- Eskiemirler, Bartın
- Eskihamidiye, Bartın
- Eyüpoğlu, Bartın
- Fırınlı, Bartın
- Gecen, Bartın
- Gençali, Bartın
- Geriş, Bartın
- Gerişkatırcı, Bartın
- Gökçekıran, Bartın
- Gözpınar, Bartın
- Gürgenpınarı, Bartın
- Gürpınar, Bartın
- Güzelcehisar, Bartın
- Hacıhatipoğlu, Bartın
- Hacıosmanoğlu, Bartın
- Hanyeri, Bartın
- Hasanefendi, Bartın
- Hasankadı, Bartın
- Hasanlar, Bartın
- Hatipler, Bartın
- Hıdırlar, Bartın
- Hocaoğlu, Bartın
- İmamlar, Bartın
- Kabagöz, Bartın
- Kaman, Bartın
- Karacaoğlu, Bartın
- Karahüseyinli, Bartın
- Karainler, Bartın
- Karaköyşeyhler, Bartın
- Karamazak, Bartın
- Karasu, Bartın
- Karayakup, Bartın
- Karşıyaka, Bartın
- Kaşbaşı, Bartın
- Kayacılar, Bartın
- Kayadibi, Bartın
- Kayadibiçavuş, Bartın
- Kayadibikavlak, Bartın
- Kışlaköy, Bartın
- Kızılelma, Bartın
- Kocareis, Bartın
- Kozcağız, Bartın
- Köyyeri, Bartın
- Kumaçorak, Bartın
- Kurt, Bartın
- Kutlubeydemirci
- Kutlubeytabaklar
- Kutlubeyyazıcılar
- Küçükkızılkum
- Kümesler, Bartın
- Mamak, Bartın
- Mekeçler, Bartın
- Muratbey, Bartın
- Okçular, Bartın
- Ören, Bartın
- Özbaşı, Bartın
- Saraylı, Bartın
- Serdar, Bartın
- Sipahiler, Bartın
- Sofular, Bartın
- Söğütlü, Bartın
- Sülek, Bartın
- Sütlüce, Bartın
- Şabankadı, Bartın
- Şahin, Bartın
- Şahne, Bartın
- Şarköy, Bartın
- Şiremirçavuş, Bartın
- Şiremirtabaklar, Bartın
- Şirinköy, Bartın
- Tabanözü, Bartın
- Tasmacı, Bartın
- Terkehaliller, Bartın
- Terkehatipler, Bartın
- Topluca, Bartın
- Tuzcular, Bartın
- Uğurlar, Bartın
- Ulugeçitambarcı, Bartın
- Ulugeçitkadı, Bartın
- Uluköy, Bartın
- Ustaoğlu, Bartın
- Uzunöz, Bartın
- Yanaz, Bartın
- Yeğenli, Bartın
- Yenihamidiye, Bartın
- Yeniköy, Bartın
- Yeşilkaya, Bartın
- Yeşilyurt, Bartın
- Yıldız, Bartın
- Yukarışeyhler, Bartın

== Amasra ==
- Amasra
- Acarlar, Amasra
- Ahatlar, Amasra
- Akkonak, Amasra
- Aliobası, Amasra
- Bostanlar, Amasra
- Cumayanı, Amasra
- Çakrazboz, Amasra
- Çakrazova, Amasra
- Çakrazşeyhler, Amasra
- Çanakçılar, Amasra
- Esenler, Amasra
- Göçkün, Amasra
- Göçkündemirci, Amasra
- Gömü, Amasra
- Hatipler, Amasra
- İnciğez, Amasra
- İnpiri, Amasra
- Kalaycı, Amasra
- Karakaçak, Amasra
- Kazpınarı, Amasra
- Kocaköy, Amasra
- Makaracı, Amasra
- Saraydüzü, Amasra
- Şenyurt, Amasra
- Şükürler, Amasra
- Tarlaağzı, Amasra
- Topallar, Amasra
- Topderesi, Amasra
- Yahyayazıcılar, Amasra
- Yukarısal, Amasra

== Kurucaşile ==
- Kurucaşile
- Alapınar, Kurucaşile
- Aydoğmuş, Kurucaşile
- Başköy, Kurucaşile
- Curunlu, Kurucaşile
- Çayaltı, Kurucaşile
- Danişment, Kurucaşile
- Demirci, Kurucaşile
- Dizlermezeci, Kurucaşile
- Elvanlar, Kurucaşile
- Hacıköy, Kurucaşile
- Hisarköy, Kurucaşile
- İlyasgeçidi, Kurucaşile
- Kaleköy, Kurucaşile
- Kanatlı, Kurucaşile
- Kapısuyu, Kurucaşile
- Karaman, Kurucaşile
- Kavaklı, Kurucaşile
- Kirlikmüslimhoca, Kurucaşile
- Kömeç, Kurucaşile
- Meydan, Kurucaşile
- Ovatekkeönü, Kurucaşile
- Ömerler, Kurucaşile
- Paşalılar, Kurucaşile
- Sarıderesi, Kurucaşile
- Şeyhler, Kurucaşile
- Uğurlu, Kurucaşile
- Yeniköy, Kurucaşile
- Ziyaretköy, Kurucaşile

== Ulus ==
- Ulus
- Abdipaşa, Ulus
- Abdurrahman, Ulus
- Ağaköy, Ulus
- Akörensöküler, Ulus
- Aktaş, Ulus
- Alıçlı, Ulus
- Alpı, Ulus
- Arpacık, Ulus
- Aşağıçamlı, Ulus
- Aşağıçerçi, Ulus
- Aşağıdere, Ulus
- Aşağıemirce, Ulus
- Aşağıköy, Ulus
- Bağdatlı, Ulus
- Bahçecik, Ulus
- Balıcak, Ulus
- Buğurlar, Ulus
- Ceyüpler, Ulus
- Çavuşköy, Ulus
- Çerde, Ulus
- Çubukbeli, Ulus
- Çubuklu, Ulus
- Dereli, Ulus
- Dibektaş, Ulus
- Dodurga, Ulus
- Doğanköy, Ulus
- Dorucaşahinci, Ulus
- Döngeller, Ulus
- Dörekler, Ulus
- Düzköy, Ulus
- Eldeş, Ulus
- Elmacık, Ulus
- Eseler, Ulus
- Gökpınar, Ulus
- Güneyören, Ulus
- Hasanören, Ulus
- Hisarköy, Ulus
- Hocaköy, Ulus
- Isırganlı, Ulus
- İbrahimderesi, Ulus
- İğneciler, Ulus
- İnceçam, Ulus
- Kadıköy, Ulus
- Kalecik, Ulus
- Karadiken, Ulus
- Karahasan, Ulus
- Karakışla, Ulus
- Kayabaşı, Ulus
- Keçideresi, Ulus
- Kıyıklar, Ulus
- Kızıllar, Ulus
- Kirazcık, Ulus
- Kirsinler, Ulus
- Konak, Ulus
- Konuklu, Ulus
- Kozanlı, Ulus
- Köklü, Ulus
- Kumluca, Ulus
- Küllü, Ulus
- Öncüler, Ulus
- Sarıfasıl, Ulus
- Sarnıç, Ulus
- Şirinler, Ulus
- Ulukaya, Ulus
- Uluköy, Ulus
- Üçsaray, Ulus
- Yenikışla, Ulus
- Yeniköy, Ulus
- Yılanlar, Ulus
- Yukarıdere, Ulus
- Zafer, Ulus
