= List of municipalities in Bartın Province =

This is the List of municipalities in Bartın Province, Turkey as of January 2023.

District	Municipality
Amasra	Amasra
Bartın	Bartın
Bartın	Hasankadı
Bartın	Kozcağız
Kurucaşile	Kurucaşile
Ulus	Abdipaşa
Ulus	Kumluca
Ulus	Ulus
