= Bartın University =

Public university in Bartın, Turkey

Coordinates: 41.600361°N 32.346084°E

- Bartın Üniversitesi
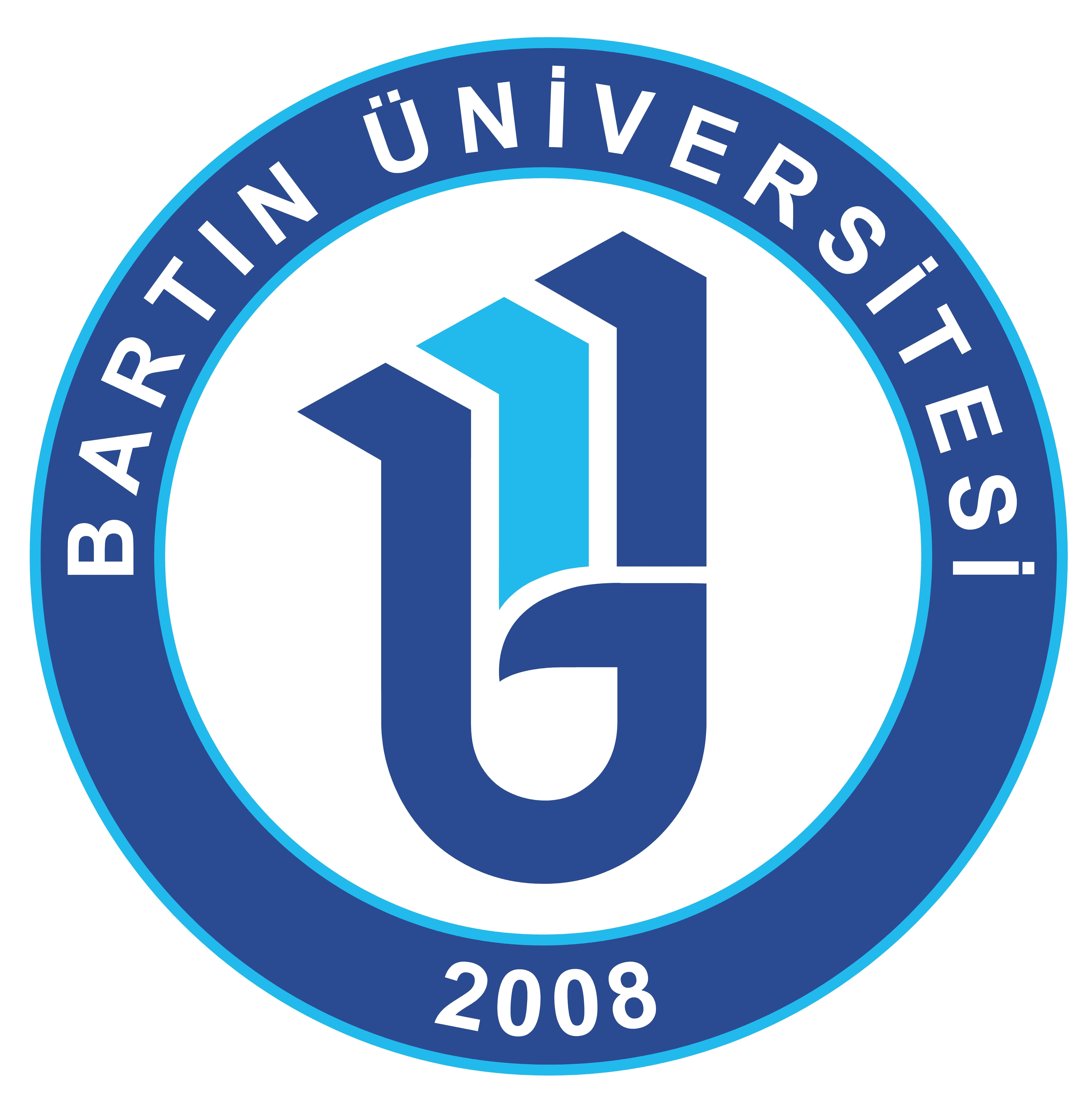
- Type: Public
- Established: 2008
- Faculty: 540
- Administrative staff: 244
- Students: 15,563
- Location: Bartın, Turkey
- Website: bartin.edu.tr

Bartın University (Turkish: Bartın Üniversitesi) is a public university located in Bartın, Turkey. It was established in 2008.

== Campus ==
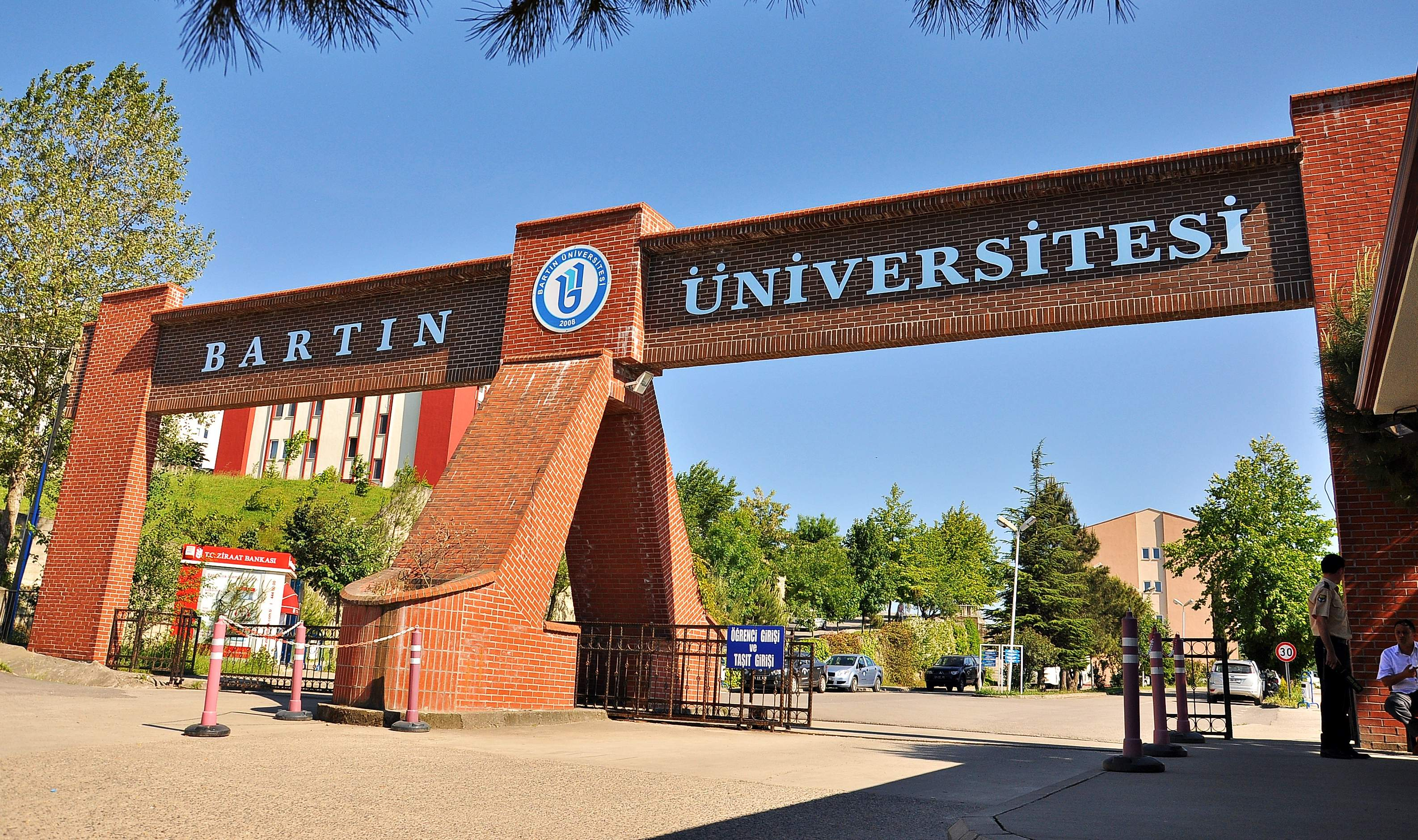
Entrance to the Ağdacı Campus

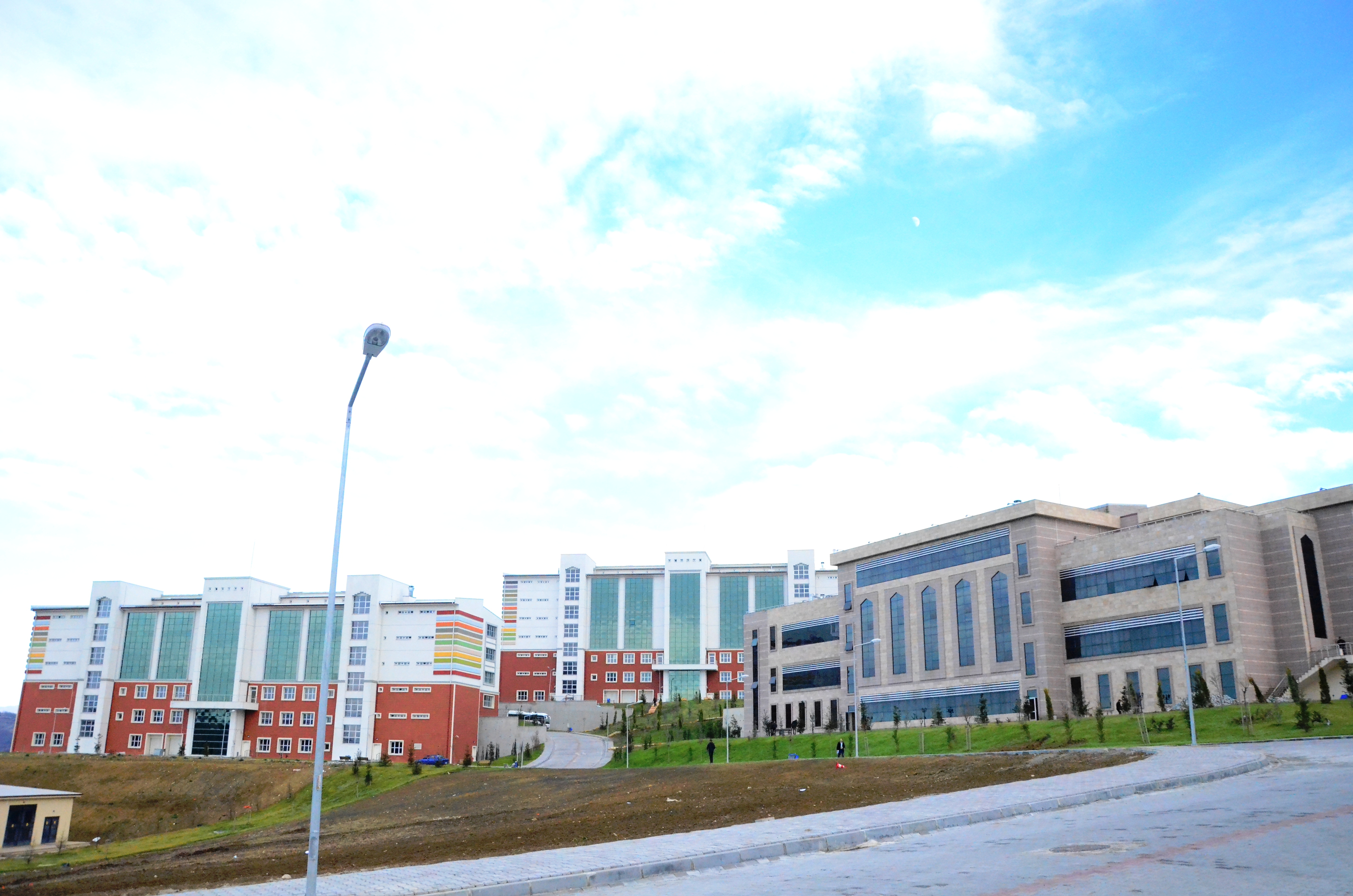
Kutlubeyyazicilar Campus

The university has two campuses: one in Ağdacı and the other in Kutlubeyyazıcılar, both of which are villages in the Bartın district.

== Academics ==
=== Faculties ===
- Faculty of Literature
- Faculty of Education
- Faculty of Economics and Administrative Sciences
- Faculty of Engineering
- Faculty of Forestry
- Faculty of Sciences
- Faculty of Islamic Sciences

=== Institutes ===
- Institute of Educational Sciences
- Graduate School of Natural Applied Sciences
- Institute of Social Sciences

=== Schools and Vocational Schools ===
- School of Physical Education and Sports
- Vocational School
- Vocational School of Health

=== Departments Under the Rectorate ===
- Furniture Workshop
- Department of Foreign Languages
- Department of Atatürk's Principles and History
- Department of Turkish Language
- Department of Informatics
- Department of Physical Education and Sports
- Department of Fine Arts
- Project and Technology Office
