= Karayakup =

Karayakup can refer to:

- Karayakup, Bartın
- Karayakup, Erdemli
- Karayakup, Göynücek
- Karayakup, Kayapınar
