= Aşağıdere =

Aşağıdere (literally "lower brook" or "below is a brook") is a Turkish place name that may refer to the following places in Turkey:

- Aşağıdere, Bartın, a village in the district of Bartın, Bartın Province
- Aşağıdere, Ilgaz
- Aşağıdere, Ulus, a village in the district of Ulus, Bartın Province
