= Sulek =

Sulek may refer to:

- Sulek (surname)
- Sülek, Bartın, a village in Bartın Province, Turkey
- Sülek, Manavgat, a village in Antalya Province, Turkey
