= Karacaoğlu =

Karacaoğlu can refer to the following villages in Turkey:

- Karacaoğlu, Bartın
- Karacaoğlu, Taşköprü
