= Dallıca =

Dallıca can refer to:

- Dallıca, Bartın
- Dallıca, Elâzığ
- Dallıca, Kemaliye
- Dallıca, Lice
- Dallıca, Nazilli
- Dallıca, Tercan
