= Tabanözü =

Tabanözü can refer to:

- Tabanözü, Bartın
- Tabanözü, Bitlis
- Tabanözü, Kovancılar
