= Özbaşı =

Özbaşı may refer to the following settlements in Turkey:

- Özbaşı, Bartın, a village in Bartın Province
- Özbaşı, Kozan, a neighbourhood in Adana Province
- Özbaşı, Posof, a village in Ardahan Province
- Özbaşı, Söke, a neighbourhood in Aydın Province
