= Akbaba =

Akbaba may refer to:

== Places ==
- Akbaba, Bartın, village in Bartın Province, Turkey
- Akbaba, Istanbul, neighborhood in Beykoz district of Istanbul Province, Turkey
- Akbaba, Sultandağı, village in Afyonkarahisar Province, Turkey

== People with the surname ==
- Çağlar Şahin Akbaba (born 1995), Turkish footballer
- Emre Akbaba (born 1992), Turkish footballer
- Kemal Akbaba (born 1988), Turkish footballer
- Ozan Akbaba (born 1982), Turkish actor

== Other ==
- Akbaba (periodical) humor and satire magazine published in Turkey.
