= Yanaz, Bartın =

Yanaz
- Village
- Location in Turkey
- Coordinates: 41°34′32″N 32°25′30″E
- Country: Turkey
- Province: Bartın
- District: Bartın
- Population (2021): 725
- Time zone: UTC+3 (TRT)

Yanaz is a village in the Bartın District, Bartın Province, Turkey. Its population is 725 (2021).

== Geography ==
Village distance is 15 km (9.3 mi) from the centre of Bartın. The economy of the village is generally based on agriculture and cattle-breeding.

== Population ==
Historical population
Year	Pop.	±% p.a.
1997	725	—
2007	816	+1.19%
2012	768	−1.21%
2017	749	−0.50%
2021	725	−0.81%
Source: 1997 census and TÜIK (2007-2021)
