= Şirinköy =

Şirinköy can refer to:

- Şirinköy, Bartın
- Şirinköy, Biga
- Şirinköy, Gökçeada
- Şirinköy, Zonguldak
