= Ahmetpaşa =

Ahmetpaşa may refer to the following places in Turkey:

- Ahmetpaşa, Bartın, a village in the district of Bartın, Bartın Province
- Ahmetpaşa, Sinanpaşa, a village in the district of Sinanpaşa, Afyonkarahisar Province
