= Hıdırlar =

Hıdırlar can refer to:

- Hıdırlar, Bartın
- Hıdırlar, Hamamözü
- Hıdırlar, Kızılcahamam
- Hıdırlar, Nallıhan
- Hıdırlar, Yenice
