= Yeğenli =

Yeğenli may refer to the following places in Turkey:

- Yeğenli, Bartın, a village in the district of Bartın, Bartın Province
- Yeğenli, Silifke, a village in the district of Silifke, Mersin Province
