= İmamlar =

İmamlar can refer to:

- İmamlar, Bartın
- İmamlar, Çameli
- İmamlar, Gerede
