= Çaybükü =

Çaybükü can refer to:

- Çaybükü, Bartın
- Çaybükü, Gümüşova
