= Terkehatipler, Bartın =

Terkehatipler
- Village
- Location within Turkey
- Coordinates: 41°33′N 32°21′E
- Country: Turkey
- Province: Bartın
- District: Bartın
- Population (2021): 940
- Time zone: UTC+3 (TRT)

Terkehatipler is a village in the Bartın District, Bartın Province, Turkey. Its population is 940 (2021).
