= Ağdacı =

- Neighbourhood
- Location in Turkey
- Coordinates: 41°37′N 32°21′E
- Country: Turkey
- Province: Bartın
- District: Bartın
- Municipality: Bartın
- Elevation: 100 m (300 ft)
- Population (2021): 1,851
- Time zone: UTC+3 (TRT)
- Postal code: 74110
- Area code: 0378

Ağdacı is a neighbourhood of the city of Bartın, Bartın District, Bartın Province, Turkey. Its population is 1,851 (2021). It is very close to Bartın and 13 kilometres (8.1 mi) from the Black Sea coast.
