= Hocaoğlu, Bartın =

Hocaoğlu
- Village
- Location within Turkey
- Coordinates: 41°26′41″N 32°18′42″E
- Country: Turkey
- Province: Bartın
- District: Bartın
- Population (2021): 383
- Time zone: UTC+3 (TRT)

Hocaoğlu is a village in the Bartın District, Bartın Province, Turkey. Its population is 383 (2021).
