= Bayıryüzü, Bartın =

Bayıryüzü
- Village
- Location within Turkey
- Coordinates: 41.527°N 32.451°E
- Country: Turkey
- Province: Bartın
- District: Bartın
- Population (2021): 648
- Time zone: UTC+3 (TRT)

Bayıryüzü is a village in the Bartın District, Bartın Province, Turkey. Its population is 648 (2021).
