= Çamaltı, Bartın =

Çamaltı
- Village
- Location within Turkey
- Coordinates: 41.6483°N 32.3839°E
- Country: Turkey
- Province: Bartın
- District: Bartın
- Population (2021): 325
- Time zone: UTC+3 (TRT)

Çamaltı is a village in the Bartın District, Bartın Province, Turkey. In 2021, its population is 325.
