= Akpınar, Bartın =

Akpınar
- Village
- Location within Turkey
- Coordinates: 41.6583°N 32.3985°E
- Country: Turkey
- Province: Bartın
- District: Bartın
- Population (2021): 575
- Time zone: UTC+3 (TRT)

Akpınar is a village in the Bartın District, Bartın Province, Turkey. Its population is 575 (2021).
