= Kızılelma, Bartın =

Kızılelma
- Village
- Location within Turkey
- Coordinates: 41.574722°N 32.181667°E
- Country: Turkey
- Province: Bartın
- District: Bartın
- Population (2021): 463
- Time zone: UTC+3 (TRT)

Kızılelma is a village in the Bartın District, Bartın Province, Turkey. Its population is 463 (2021).
