= Başoğlu, Bartın =

Başoğlu
- Village
- Location within Turkey
- Coordinates: 41°30′N 32°15′E
- Country: Turkey
- Province: Bartın
- District: Bartın
- Population (2021): 207
- Time zone: UTC+3 (TRT)

Başoğlu is a village in the Bartın District, Bartın Province, Turkey. Its population is 207 (2021).
