= Gençali, Bartın =

Gençali
- Village
- Location within Turkey
- Country: Turkey
- Province: Bartın
- District: Bartın
- Population (2021): 368
- Time zone: UTC+3 (TRT)

Gençali is a village in the Bartın District, Bartın Province, Turkey. Its population is 368 (2021).
