= Hasanlar, Bartın =

Hasanlar
- Village
- Location within Turkey
- Coordinates: 41°36′24″N 32°27′32″E
- Country: Turkey
- Province: Bartın
- District: Bartın
- Population (2021): 315
- Time zone: UTC+3 (TRT)

Hasanlar is a village in the Bartın District, Bartın Province, Turkey. Its population is 315 (2021).
