= Çayır, Bartın =

Çayır
- Village
- Location within Turkey
- Country: Turkey
- Province: Bartın
- District: Bartın
- Population (2021): 321
- Time zone: UTC+3 (TRT)

Çayır is a village in the Bartın District, Bartın Province, Turkey. Its population is 321 (2021).
