= Karahüseyinli, Bartın =

Karahüseyinli
- Village
- Location within Turkey
- Country: Turkey
- Province: Bartın
- District: Bartın
- Population (2021): 550
- Time zone: UTC+3 (TRT)

Karahüseyinli is a village in the Bartın District, Bartın Province, Turkey. Its population is 550 (2021).
