= Çakırdemirci, Bartın =

Çakırdemirci
- Village
- Location within Turkey
- Coordinates: 41°36′N 32°15′E
- Country: Turkey
- Province: Bartın
- District: Bartın
- Population (2021): 452
- Time zone: UTC+3 (TRT)

Çakırdemirci is a village in the Bartın District, Bartın Province, Turkey. Its population is 452 (2021).
