= Celilbeyoğlu, Bartın =

Celilbeyoğlu
- Village
- Location within Turkey
- Coordinates: 41°24′25″N 32°17′25″E
- Country: Turkey
- Province: Bartın
- District: Bartın
- Population (2021): 308
- Time zone: UTC+3 (TRT)

Celilbeyoğlu is a village in the Bartın District, Bartın Province, Turkey. Its population is 308 (2021).
