= Küçükkızılkum =

- Village
- Location within Turkey
- Coordinates: 41°34′N 32°09′E
- Country: Turkey
- Province: Bartın
- District: Bartın
- Population (2021): 369
- Time zone: UTC+3 (TRT)

Küçükkızılkum is a village in the Bartın District, Bartın Province, Turkey. Its population is 369 (2021).
