= Mamak, Bartın =

Mamak
- Village
- Location within Turkey
- Country: Turkey
- Province: Bartın
- District: Bartın
- Population (2021): 560
- Time zone: UTC+3 (TRT)

Mamak is a village in the Bartın District, Bartın Province, Turkey. Its population is 560 (2021).
