= Eskihamidiye, Bartın =

Eskihamidiye
- Village
- Location within Turkey
- Coordinates: 41°29′10″N 32°20′42″E
- Country: Turkey
- Province: Bartın
- District: Bartın
- Population (2021): 757
- Time zone: UTC+3 (TRT)

Eskihamidiye is a village in the Bartın District, Bartın Province, Turkey. Its population is 757 (2021).
