= Serdar, Bartın =

Serdar
- Village
- Location within Turkey
- Coordinates: 41°37′N 32°26′E
- Country: Turkey
- Province: Bartın
- District: Bartın
- Population (2021): 511
- Time zone: UTC+3 (TRT)

Serdar is a village in the Bartın District, Bartın Province, Turkey. Its population is 511 (2021).
