= Şiremirtabaklar, Bartın =

Şiremirtabaklar
- Village
- Location within Turkey
- Coordinates: 41°36′N 32°18′E
- Country: Turkey
- Province: Bartın
- District: Bartın
- Population (2021): 194
- Time zone: UTC+3 (TRT)

Şiremirtabaklar is a village in the Bartın District, Bartın Province, Turkey. Its population is 194 (2021).
