= Tuzcular, Bartın =

Tuzcular
- Village
- Location within Turkey
- Coordinates: 41°34′7″N 32°18′55″E
- Country: Turkey
- Province: Bartın
- District: Bartın
- Population (2021): 3,185
- Time zone: UTC+3 (TRT)

Tuzcular is a village in the Bartın District, Bartın Province, Turkey. Its population is 3,185 (2021).
