= Kutlubeytabaklar =

- Village
- Location within Turkey
- Coordinates: 41°34′N 32°18′E
- Country: Turkey
- Province: Bartın
- District: Bartın
- Population (2021): 389
- Time zone: UTC+3 (TRT)

Kutlubeytabaklar is a village in the Bartın District, Bartın Province, Turkey. Its population is 389 (2021).
