= Kumluca, Bartın =

Kumluca
- Municipality
- Location in Turkey
- Coordinates: 41°27′N 32°28′E
- Country: Turkey
- Province: Bartın
- District: Ulus
- Elevation: 200 m (700 ft)
- Population (2021): 2,064
- Time zone: UTC+3 (TRT)
- Postal code: 74410
- Area code: 0378

Kumluca (formerly: Kocanos) is a town (belde) and municipality in the Ulus District, Bartın Province, Turkey. Its population is 2,064 (2021). It is situated along the Kocanaz River. The distance to Ulus is 29 kilometres (18 mi) and to Bartın 38 kilometres (24 mi).
