= Ellibaş, Bartın =

Ellibaş
- Village
- Location within Turkey
- Coordinates: 41°27′N 32°16′E
- Country: Turkey
- Province: Bartın
- District: Bartın
- Population (2021): 752
- Time zone: UTC+3 (TRT)

Ellibaş is a village in the Bartın District, Bartın Province, Turkey. Its population is 752 (2021).
