= Akmanlar, Bartın =

Akmanlar
- Village
- Location within Turkey
- Coordinates: 41°32′44″N 32°13′40″E
- Country: Turkey
- Province: Bartın
- District: Bartın
- Population (2021): 716
- Time zone: UTC+3 (TRT)

Akmanlar is a village in the Bartın District, Bartın Province, Turkey. Its population is 716 (2021).
