= Ören, Bartın =

Ören
- Village
- Location within Turkey
- Country: Turkey
- Province: Bartın
- District: Bartın
- Population (2021): 243
- Time zone: UTC+3 (TRT)

Ören is a village in the Bartın District, Bartın Province, Turkey. Its population is 243 (2021).
