= Söğütlü, Bartın =

Söğütlü
- Village
- Location within Turkey
- Country: Turkey
- Province: Bartın
- District: Bartın
- Population (2021): 126
- Time zone: UTC+3 (TRT)

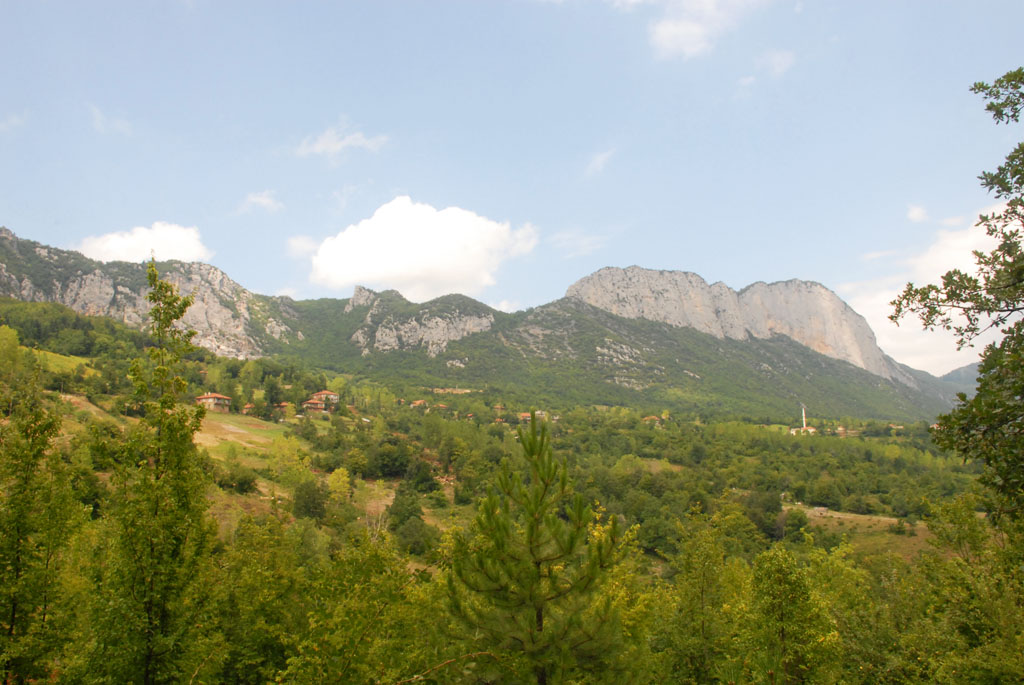
Image of Sogutlu Koyu

Söğütlü is a village in the Bartın District, Bartın Province, Turkey. Its population is 126 (2021).
