= Akbaş, Bartın =

Akbaş
- Village
- Location within Turkey
- Coordinates: 41.3685°N 32.3247°E
- Country: Turkey
- Province: Bartın
- District: Bartın
- Population (2021): 748
- Time zone: UTC+3 (TRT)

Akbaş is a village in the Bartın District, Bartın Province, Turkey. Its population is 748 (2021).
