= Saraylı, Bartın =

Sarayli
- Village
- Location within Turkey
- Country: Turkey
- Province: Bartın
- District: Bartın
- Population (2021): 411
- Time zone: UTC+3 (TRT)

Sarayli is a village in the Bartın District, Bartın Province, Turkey. Its population is 411 (2021).
