= Beşköprü, Bartın =

Beşköprü
- Village
- Location within Turkey
- Coordinates: 41.5841°N 32.1739°E
- Country: Turkey
- Province: Bartın
- District: Bartın
- Population (2021): 247
- Time zone: UTC+3 (TRT)

Beşköprü is a village in the Bartın District, Bartın Province, Turkey. Its population is 247 (2021).
