= Epçiler =

- Village
- Location within Turkey
- Coordinates: 41°35′50″N 32°26′40″E
- Country: Turkey
- Province: Bartın
- District: Bartın
- Elevation: 75 m (246 ft)
- Population (2021): 1,157
- Time zone: UTC+3 (TRT)
- Postal code: 74110
- Area code: 0378

Epçiler is a village the Bartın District, Bartın Province, Turkey. Its population is 1,157 (2021). It is situated in a low valley between two chain mountains running parallel to Black Sea coast. Distance to Bartın is 13 kilometres (8.1 mi). The name of the village may be a corrupt form of the word ipçiler meaning "ropemaker"s Turkish: ipçi of the past.
