= Hatipler, Bartın =

Hatipler
- Village
- Location within Turkey
- Coordinates: 41.5877°N 32.1408°E
- Country: Turkey
- Province: Bartın
- District: Bartın
- Population (2021): 322
- Time zone: UTC+3 (TRT)

Hatipler is a village in the Bartın District, Bartın Province, Turkey. Its population is 322 (2021).
