= Ustaoğlu, Bartın =

Ustaoğlu
- Village
- Location within Turkey
- Coordinates: 41°24′N 32°17′E
- Country: Turkey
- Province: Bartın
- District: Bartın
- Population (2021): 380
- Time zone: UTC+3 (TRT)

Ustaoğlu is a village in the Bartın District, Bartın Province, Turkey. Its population is 380 (2021).
