= Kumaçorak, Bartın =

Kumaçorak
- Village
- Location within Turkey
- Coordinates: 41°41′35″N 32°41′45″E
- Country: Turkey
- Province: Bartın
- District: Bartın
- Population (2021): 247
- Time zone: UTC+3 (TRT)

Kumaçorak is a village in the Bartın District, Bartın Province, Turkey. Its population is 247 (2021).
