= Doğaşı, Bartın =

Doğaşı
- Village
- Location within Turkey
- Country: Turkey
- Province: Bartın
- District: Bartın
- Population (2021): 596
- Time zone: UTC+3 (TRT)

Doğaşı is a village in the Bartın District, Bartın Province, Turkey. Its population is 596 (2021).
