= Yeşilyurt, Bartın =

Yeşilyurt
- Village
- Location within Turkey
- Country: Turkey
- Province: Bartın
- District: Bartın
- Population (2021): 444
- Time zone: UTC+3 (TRT)

Yeşilyurt is a village in the Bartın District, Bartın Province, Turkey. Its population is 444 (2021).
