= Kaşbaşı, Bartın =

Kaşbaşı
- Village
- Location within Turkey
- Country: Turkey
- Province: Bartın
- District: Bartın
- Population (2021): 292
- Time zone: UTC+3 (TRT)

Kaşbaşı is a village in the Bartın District, Bartın Province, Turkey. Its population is 292 (2021).
