= Kabagöz, Bartın =

Kabagöz
- Village
- Location within Turkey
- Coordinates: 41.615556°N 32.3875°E
- Country: Turkey
- Province: Bartın
- District: Bartın
- Population (2021): 671
- Time zone: UTC+3 (TRT)

Kabagöz is a village in the Bartın District, Bartın Province, Turkey. Its population is 671 (2021).

The village has had the same name since 1928. The village is 9 km away from the Bartın city center.
