= Geriş, Bartın =

Geriş
- Village
- Location within Turkey
- Coordinates: 41°34′12″N 32°26′11″E
- Country: Turkey
- Province: Bartın
- District: Bartın
- Population (2021): 1,159
- Time zone: UTC+3 (TRT)

Geriş is a village in the Bartın District, Bartın Province, Turkey. Its population is 1,159 (2021).
