= Arıt, Bartın =

Arıt
- Village
- Location within Turkey
- Coordinates: 41°41′N 32°37′E
- Country: Turkey
- Province: Bartın
- District: Bartın
- Elevation: 345 m (1,132 ft)
- Population (2021): 310
- Time zone: UTC+3 (TRT)
- Postal code: 74020
- Area code: 0378

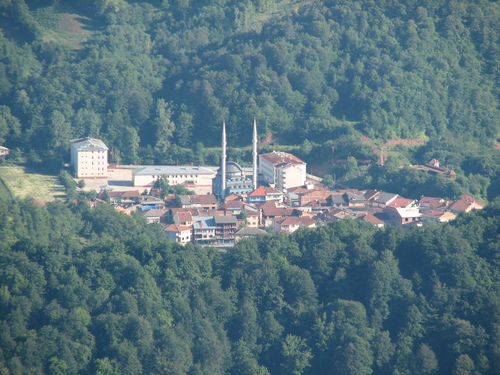

Arıt is a village in the Bartın District, Bartın Province, Turkey. Its population is 310 (2021). Before the 2013 reorganisation, it was a town (belde).

It is in a narrow valley. The village is situated in the dense forests and a National Park has been established around the village. The distance to Bartın is 30 kilometres (19 mi) and the bird’s flight distance Black Sea coast is about 15 kilometres (9.3 mi). In the vicinity of the town there are ruins of Roman Empire era. But the deep history of the town is not known. The name of the town may either stem from the Turkish word Arıtılmış (“purified”) or from ancient Paphlagonian word Erythinoi . According to first opinion the town was founded by Turks who escaped from the never ending civil wars of the Central Anatolia in the 13th century. According to second opinion, the name of the town may refer to red soil around the town. The first written reference to the town was in 1747 when Uluslu İbrahim Hamdi referred to the town as its present name.
