= Köyyeri, Bartın =

Köyyeri
- Village
- Location within Turkey
- Country: Turkey
- Province: Bartın
- District: Bartın
- Population (2021): 383
- Time zone: UTC+3 (TRT)

Köyyeri is a village in the Bartın District, Bartın Province, Turkey. As of 2021, its population is 383.
