= Akgöz, Bartın =

Akgöz
- Village
- Location within Turkey
- Coordinates: 41°39′40″N 32°18′27″E
- Country: Turkey
- Province: Bartın
- District: Bartın
- Population (2021): 405
- Time zone: UTC+3 (TRT)

Akgöz is a village in the Bartın District, Bartın Province, Turkey. Its population is 405 (2021).
