= Arıönü, Bartın =

Arıönü
- Village
- Location within Turkey
- Coordinates: 41°37′N 32°11′E
- Country: Turkey
- Province: Bartın
- District: Bartın
- Population (2021): 721
- Time zone: UTC+3 (TRT)

Arıönü is a village in the Bartın District, Bartın Province, Turkey. Its population is 721 (2021).
