= Aydınlar, Bartın =

Aydınlar
- Village
- Location within Turkey
- Coordinates: 41.7054°N 32.6859°E
- Country: Turkey
- Province: Bartın
- District: Bartın
- Population (2021): 398
- Time zone: UTC+3 (TRT)

Aydınlar is a village in the Bartın District, Bartın Province, Turkey. Its population is 398 (2021).
