= Çakırömerağa, Bartın =

Çakırömerağa
- Village
- Location within Turkey
- Coordinates: 41°35′N 32°18′E
- Country: Turkey
- Province: Bartın
- District: Bartın
- Population (2021): 234
- Time zone: UTC+3 (TRT)

Çakırömerağa is a village in the Bartın District, Bartın Province, Turkey. Its population is 234 (2021).
