= Çiftlikköy, Bartın =

Çiftlikköy
- Village
- Location within Turkey
- Coordinates: 41.523488°N 32.182035°E
- Country: Turkey
- Province: Bartın
- District: Bartın
- Population (2021): 387
- Time zone: UTC+3 (TRT)

Çiftlikköy is a village in the Bartın District, Bartın Province, Turkey. Its population is 387 (2021).
