= Karamazak, Bartın =

Karamazak
- Village
- Location within Turkey
- Coordinates: 41°34′N 32°13′E
- Country: Turkey
- Province: Bartın
- District: Bartın
- Population (2021): 640
- Time zone: UTC+3 (TRT)

Karamazak is a village in the Bartın District, Bartın Province, Turkey. Its population is 640 (2021).
