= Güzelcehisar, Bartın =

Güzelcehisar
- Village
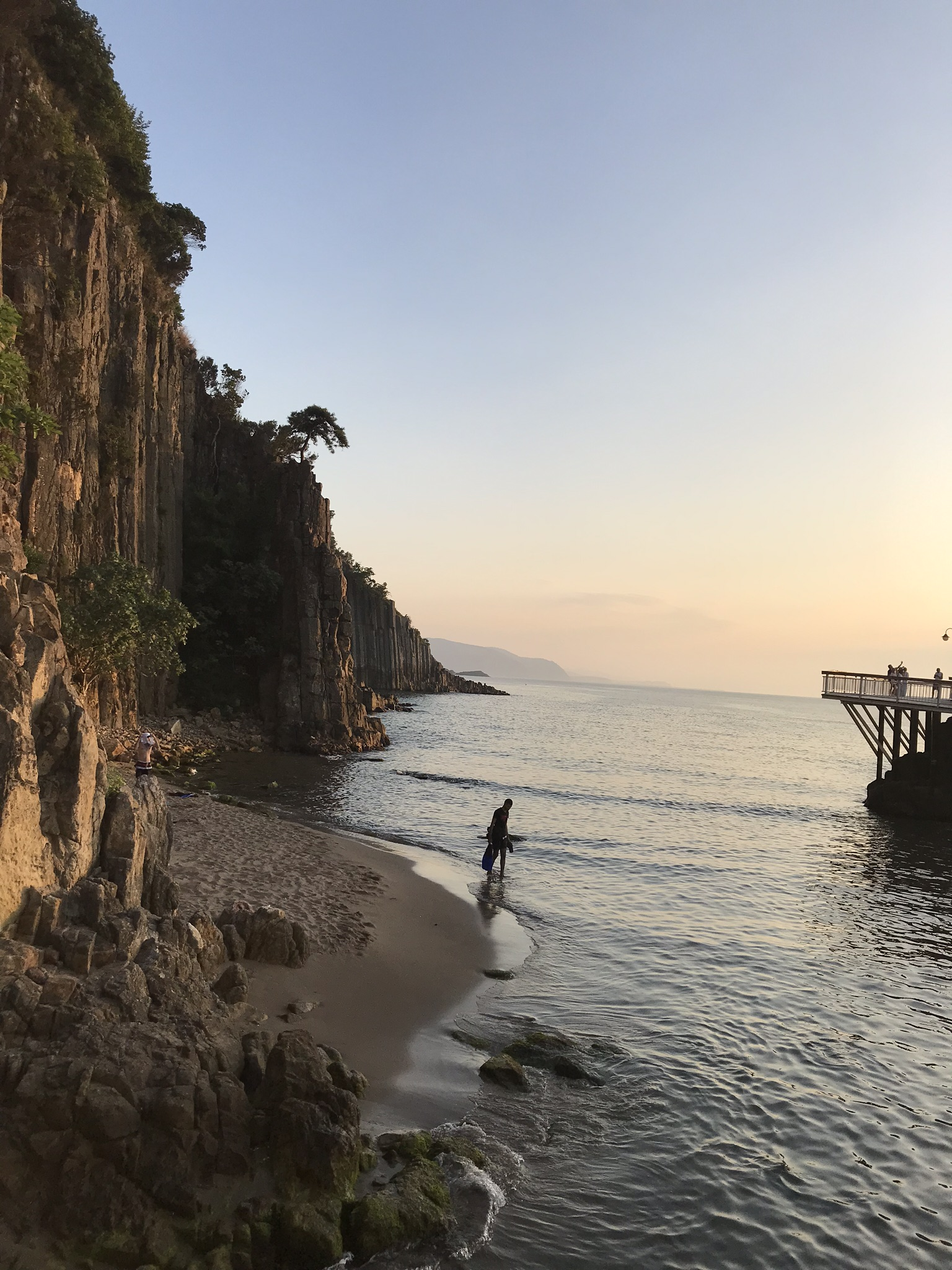

- Location within Turkey
- Coordinates: 41°39′N 32°13′E
- Country: Turkey
- Province: Bartın
- District: Bartın
- Population (2021): 760
- Time zone: UTC+3 (TRT)

Güzelcehisar is a village in the Bartın District, Bartın Province, Turkey. Its population is 760 (2021).
