= Kümesler, Bartın =

Kümesler
- Village
- Location within Turkey
- Coordinates: 41°34′N 32°22′E
- Country: Turkey
- Province: Bartın
- District: Bartın
- Population (2021): 382
- Time zone: UTC+3 (TRT)

Kümesler is a village in the Bartın District, Bartın Province, Turkey. Its population is 382 (2021).
