= Budakdüzü, Bartın =

Budakdüzü
- Village
- Location within Turkey
- Coordinates: 41°34′N 32°21′E
- Country: Turkey
- Province: Bartın
- District: Bartın
- Population (2021): 530
- Time zone: UTC+3 (TRT)

Budakdüzü is a village in the Bartın District, Bartın Province, Turkey. Its population is 530 (2021).
