= Esbey, Bartın =

Esbey
- Village
- Location within Turkey
- Coordinates: 41°42′N 32°42′E
- Country: Turkey
- Province: Bartın
- District: Bartın
- Population (2021): 132
- Time zone: UTC+3 (TRT)

Esbey is a village in the Bartın District, Bartın Province, Turkey. Its population is 132 (2021).
