= Büyükkızılkum, Bartın =

Büyükkızılkum
- Village
- Location within Turkey
- Coordinates: 41°34′N 32°07′E
- Country: Turkey
- Province: Bartın
- District: Bartın
- Population (2021): 324
- Time zone: UTC+3 (TRT)

Büyükkızılkum is a village in the Bartın District, Bartın Province, Turkey. Its population is 324 (2021).
