= Epçilerkadı, Bartın =

Epçilerkadı
- Village
- Location within Turkey
- Coordinates: 41°36′0″N 32°25′15″E
- Country: Turkey
- Province: Bartın
- District: Bartın
- Population (2021): 266
- Time zone: UTC+3 (TRT)

Epçilerkadı is a village in the Bartın District, Bartın Province, Turkey. Its population is 266 (2021).
