= Dırazlar, Bartın =

Dırazlar
- Village
- Location within Turkey
- Coordinates: 41°29′N 32°18′E
- Country: Turkey
- Province: Bartın
- District: Bartın
- Population (2021): 656
- Time zone: UTC+3 (TRT)

Dırazlar is a village in the Bartın District, Bartın Province, Turkey. Its population is 656 (2021).
