= Alibaş, Bartın =

Alibaş
- Village
- Location within Turkey
- Coordinates: 41.6131°N 32.4611°E
- Country: Turkey
- Province: Bartın
- District: Bartın
- Population (2021): 353
- Time zone: UTC+3 (TRT)

Alibaş is a village in the Bartın District, Bartın Province, Turkey. Its population is 353 (2021).
