= Esenyurt, Bartın =

Esenyurt
- Village
- Location within Turkey
- Coordinates: 41°32′59″N 32°14′49″E
- Country: Turkey
- Province: Bartın
- District: Bartın
- Population (2021): 872
- Time zone: UTC+3 (TRT)

Esenyurt is a village in the Bartın District, Bartın Province, Turkey. Its population is 872 (2021).
