= Ecikler, Bartın =

Ecikler
- Village
- Location within Turkey
- Coordinates: 41°26′N 32°18′E
- Country: Turkey
- Province: Bartın
- District: Bartın
- Population (2021): 862
- Time zone: UTC+3 (TRT)

Ecikler is a village in the Bartın District, Bartın Province, Turkey. Its population is 862 (2021).
