= Şabankadı, Bartın =

Şabankadı
- Village
- Location within Turkey
- Coordinates: 41°29′N 32°16′E
- Country: Turkey
- Province: Bartın
- District: Bartın
- Population (2021): 438
- Time zone: UTC+3 (TRT)

Şabankadı is a village in the Bartın District, Bartın Province, Turkey. Its population is 438 (2021).
