= Kocareis, Bartın =

Kocareis
- Village
- Location within Turkey
- Coordinates: 41°39′N 32°18′E
- Country: Turkey
- Province: Bartın
- District: Bartın
- Population (2021): 553
- Time zone: UTC+3 (TRT)

Kocareis is a village in the Bartın District, Bartın Province, Turkey. Its population is 553 (2021).
