= Şarköy, Bartın =

Şarköy
- Village
- Location within Turkey
- Coordinates: 41.4797°N 32.3592°E
- Country: Turkey
- Province: Bartın
- District: Bartın
- Population (2021): 379
- Time zone: UTC+3 (TRT)

Şarköy is a village in the Bartın District, Bartın Province, Turkey. Its population is 379 (2021).
