= Ulugeçitkadı, Bartın =

Ulugeçitkadı
- Village
- Location within Turkey
- Coordinates: 41°36′N 32°14′E
- Country: Turkey
- Province: Bartın
- District: Bartın
- Population (2021): 482
- Time zone: UTC+3 (TRT)

Ulugeçitkadı is a village in the Bartın District, Bartın Province, Turkey. Its population is 482 (2021).
