= Akçalı, Bartın =

Akçalı
- Village
- Location within Turkey
- Coordinates: 41.6029°N 32.3935°E
- Country: Turkey
- Province: Bartın
- District: Bartın
- Population (2021): 846
- Time zone: UTC+3 (TRT)

Akçalı is a village in the Bartın District, Bartın Province, Turkey. Its population is 846 (2021).
