= Karadiken, Ulus =

Karadiken
- Neighbourhood
- Location in Turkey
- Coordinates: 41.5282°N 32.5750°E
- Country: Turkey
- Province: Bartın
- District: Ulus
- Municipality: Abdipaşa
- Population (2021): 57
- Time zone: UTC+3 (TRT)

Karadiken is a neighbourhood of the town Abdipaşa, Ulus District, Bartın Province, Turkey. Its population is 57 (2021).
