= Çukurbük, Bartın =

Çukurbük
- Village
- Location within Turkey
- Coordinates: 41.62442°N 32.45237°E
- Country: Turkey
- Province: Bartın
- District: Bartın
- Population (2021): 364
- Time zone: UTC+3 (TRT)

Çukurbük is a village in the Bartın District, Bartın Province, Turkey. Its population is 364 (2021).
