= Çakırkadı, Bartın =

Çakırkadı
- Village
- Location within Turkey
- Coordinates: 41°35′N 32°17′E
- Country: Turkey
- Province: Bartın
- District: Bartın
- Population (2021): 680
- Time zone: UTC+3 (TRT)

Çakırkadı is a village in the Bartın District, Bartın Province, Turkey. Its population is 680 (2021).
