= Eyüpoğlu, Bartın =

Eyüpoğlu
- Village
- Location within Turkey
- Coordinates: 41°22′50″N 32°23′37″E
- Country: Turkey
- Province: Bartın
- District: Bartın
- Population (2021): 144
- Time zone: UTC+3 (TRT)

View of Eyüpoğlu from the air

Eyüpoğlu is a village in the Bartın District, Bartın Province, Turkey. Its population is 144 (2021).
