= Bakioğlu, Bartın =

Bakioğlu
- Village
- Location in Turkey
- Coordinates: 41°26′N 32°21′E
- Country: Turkey
- Province: Bartın
- District: Bartın
- Population (2021): 784
- Time zone: UTC+3 (TRT)

Bakioğlu is a village in the Bartın District, Bartın Province, Turkey. Its population in 2021 was 784.
