= Çöpbey, Bartın =

Çöpbey
- Village
- Location within Turkey
- Coordinates: 41°42′N 32°35′E
- Country: Turkey
- Province: Bartın
- District: Bartın
- Population (2021): 232
- Time zone: UTC+3 (TRT)

Çöpbey is a village in the Bartın District, Bartın Province, Turkey. Its population is 232 (2021).
