= Büyükkıran, Bartın =

Büyükkıran
- Village
- Location within Turkey
- Coordinates: 41°33′N 32°24′E
- Country: Turkey
- Province: Bartın
- District: Bartın
- Population (2021): 555
- Time zone: UTC+3 (TRT)

Büyükkıran is a village in the Bartın District, Bartın Province, Turkey. Its population is 555 (2021).
