= Karaköyşeyhler, Bartın =

Karaköyşeyhler
- Village
- Location within Turkey
- Coordinates: 41°38′N 32°34′E
- Country: Turkey
- Province: Bartın
- District: Bartın
- Population (2021): 299
- Time zone: UTC+3 (TRT)

Karaköyşeyhler is a village in the Bartın District, Bartın Province, Turkey. Its population is 299 (2021).
