= Çamlık, Bartın =

Çamlık
- Village
- Location within Turkey
- Coordinates: 41.5456°N 32.4558°E
- Country: Turkey
- Province: Bartın
- District: Bartın
- Population (2021): 123
- Time zone: UTC+3 (TRT)

Çamlık is a village in the Bartın District, Bartın Province, Turkey. Its population is 123 (2021).
