= Barkaçboz, Bartın =

Barkaçboz
- Village
- Location within Turkey
- Coordinates: 41°27′N 32°21′E
- Country: Turkey
- Province: Bartın
- District: Bartın
- Population (2021): 710
- Time zone: UTC+3 (TRT)

Barkaçboz is a village in Bartın District, Bartın Province, Turkey.

Its population is 710 (2021).
