= Gökçekıran, Bartın =

Gökçekıran
- Village
- Location in Turkey
- Coordinates: 41°32′N 32°26′E
- Country: Turkey
- Province: Bartın
- District: Bartın
- Population (2021): 661
- Time zone: UTC+3 (TRT)

Gökçekıran is a village in the Bartın District, Bartın Province, Turkey. Its population is 661 (2021).
