= Kayadibikavlak, Bartın =

Kayadibikavlak
- Village
- Location within Turkey
- Coordinates: 41°39′N 32°29′E
- Country: Turkey
- Province: Bartın
- District: Bartın
- Population (2021): 526
- Time zone: UTC+3 (TRT)

Kayadibikavlak is a village in the Bartın District, Bartın Province, Turkey. Its population is 526 (2021).
