= Bedil, Bartın =

Bedil
- Village
- Location within Turkey
- Coordinates: 41.4863°N 32.2891°E
- Country: Turkey
- Province: Bartın
- District: Bartın
- Population (2021): 519
- Time zone: UTC+3 (TRT)

Bedil is a village in the Bartın District, Bartın Province, Turkey. Its population is 519 (2021).
