= Karainler, Bartın =

Karainler
- Village
- Location in Turkey
- Coordinates: 41°40′N 32°27′E
- Country: Turkey
- Province: Bartın
- District: Bartın
- Population (2021): 983
- Time zone: UTC+3 (TRT)

Karainler is a village in the Bartın District, Bartın Province, Turkey. Its population is 983 (2021).
