= Derbent, Bartın =

Derbent
- Village
- Location within Turkey
- Coordinates: 41.539722°N 32.472222°E
- Country: Turkey
- Province: Bartın
- District: Bartın
- Population (2021): 283
- Time zone: UTC+3 (TRT)

Derbent is a village in the Bartın District, Bartın Province, Turkey. Its population is 283 (2021).
