= Eskiemirler, Bartın =

Eskiemirler
- Village
- Location within Turkey
- Coordinates: 41°22′N 32°24′E
- Country: Turkey
- Province: Bartın
- District: Bartın
- Population (2021): 317
- Time zone: UTC+3 (TRT)

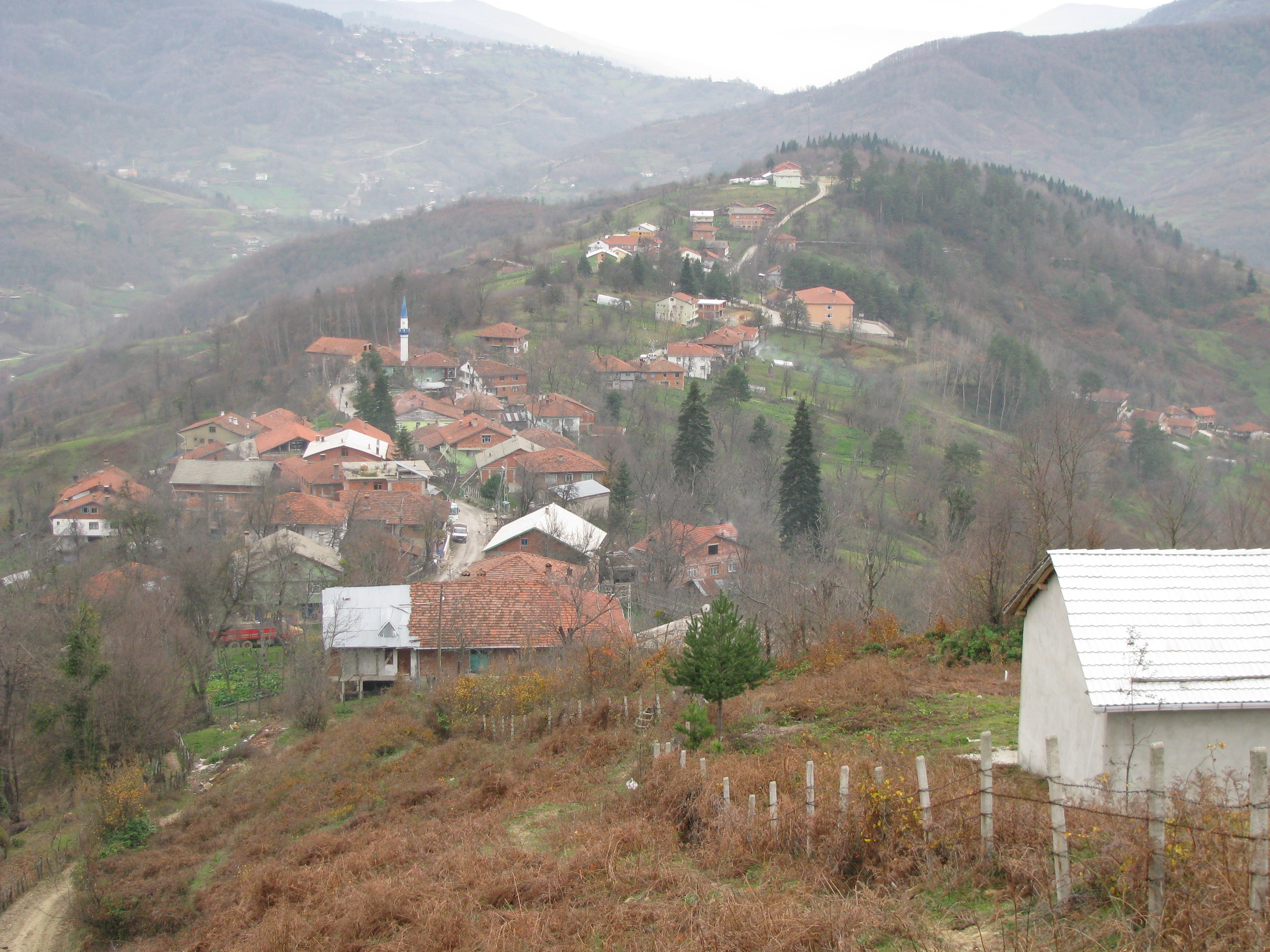
Eskiemirler in 2008

Eskiemirler is a village in the Bartın District, Bartın Province, Turkey. Its population is 317 (2021).
