= Avgölü, Bartın =

Avgölü
- Village
- Location within Turkey
- Coordinates: 41°27′N 32°22′E
- Country: Turkey
- Province: Bartın
- District: Bartın
- Population (2021): 165
- Time zone: UTC+3 (TRT)

Avgölü is a village in the Bartın District, Bartın Province, Turkey.

== 2021 population ==
Its population is 165 (2021).
