= Tasmacı, Bartın =

Tasmacı
- Village
- Location within Turkey
- Country: Turkey
- Province: Bartın
- District: Bartın
- Population (2021): 228
- Time zone: UTC+3 (TRT)

Tasmacı is a village in the Bartın District, Bartın Province, Turkey. Its population is 228 (2021).
