= Kışlaköy, Bartın =

Kışlaköy
- Village
- Location within Turkey
- Country: Turkey
- Province: Bartın
- District: Bartın
- Population (2021): 518
- Time zone: UTC+3 (TRT)

Kışlaköy (also: Kışla) is a village in the Bartın District, Bartın Province, Turkey. Its population is 518 (2021).
