= Akağaç, Bartın =

Akağaç
- Village
- Location within Turkey
- Coordinates: 41.51436°N 32.4187°E
- Country: Turkey
- Province: Bartın
- District: Bartın
- Population (2021): 1,056
- Time zone: UTC+3 (TRT)

Akağaç is a village in the Bartın District, Bartın Province, Turkey. Its population is 1,056 (2021).
