= Gerişkatırcı, Bartın =

Gerişkatırcı
- Village
- Location within Turkey
- Coordinates: 41°33′N 32°26′E
- Country: Turkey
- Province: Bartın
- District: Bartın
- Population (2021): 621
- Time zone: UTC+3 (TRT)

Gerişkatırcı is a village in the Bartın District, Bartın Province, Turkey. Its population is 621 (2021).
