= Gürpınar, Bartın =

Gürpınar
- Village
- Location within Turkey
- Coordinates: 41.625556°N 32.409444°E
- Country: Turkey
- Province: Bartın
- District: Bartın
- Population (2021): 332
- Time zone: UTC+3 (TRT)

Gürpınar is a village in the Bartın District, Bartın Province, Turkey. Its population is 332 (2021).
