= Sinap, Erdemli =

Sinap
- Neighbourhood
- Location in Turkey
- Coordinates: 36°48′N 34°20′E
- Country: Turkey
- Province: Mersin
- District: Erdemli
- Elevation: 860 m (2,820 ft)
- Population (2022): 179
- Time zone: UTC+3 (TRT)
- Postal code: 33730
- Area code: 0324

Sinap is a neighbourhood in the municipality and district of Erdemli, Mersin Province, Turkey. Its population is 179 (2022). The village is situated in the peneplane area to the north of Çukurova (Cilicia) plains. The distance to Erdemli is 28 kilometres (17 mi) and the distance to Mersin is 44 kilometres (27 mi). The name of the village probably means "underwater". The castle ruin Sinap Kalesi proves that the area around Sinap was inhabited during ancient and early medieval times. The later history of the village is more or less intermingled with that of Karayakup village. Up to 1989 Sinap was a part of Karayakup. The main economic activity is farming. Figs and other fruits are the main crops. Goat and cattle breeding are other activities.
