= Şahin, Bartın =

Şahin
- Village
- Location within Turkey
- Country: Turkey
- Province: Bartın
- District: Bartın
- Population (2021): 307
- Time zone: UTC+3 (TRT)

Şahin is a village in the Bartın District, Bartın Province, Turkey. Its population is 307 (2021).
