= Mekeçler, Bartın =

Mekeçler
- Village
- Location within Turkey
- Coordinates: 41°32′N 32°23′E
- Country: Turkey
- Province: Bartın
- District: Bartın
- Population (2021): 441
- Time zone: UTC+3 (TRT)

Mekeçler is a village in the Bartın District, Bartın Province, Turkey. Its population is 441 (2021).
