= Terkehaliller, Bartın =

Terkehaliller
- Village
- Location within Turkey
- Coordinates: 41°34′N 32°23′E
- Country: Turkey
- Province: Bartın
- District: Bartın
- Population (2021): 989
- Time zone: UTC+3 (TRT)

Terkehaliller is a village in the Bartın District, Bartın Province, Turkey. Its population is 989 (2021).
