= Akıncılar, Bartın Province =

Akıncılar
- Village
- Location within Turkey
- Coordinates: 41.5159°N 32.3064°E
- Country: Turkey
- Province: Bartın
- District: Bartın
- Population (2021): 671
- Time zone: UTC+3 (TRT)

Akıncılar is a village in the Bartın District, Bartın Province, Turkey. Its population is 671 (2021).
