= Topluca, Bartın =

Topluca
- Village
- Location in Turkey
- Coordinates: 41°39′13″N 32°17′46″E
- Country: Turkey
- Province: Bartın
- District: Bartın
- Population (2022): 561
- Time zone: UTC+3 (TRT)

Topluca is a village in the Bartın District, Bartın Province, Turkey. Its population is 561 (2022). The village is 5 km (3.1 mi) from Bartın city center.

== History ==
The name of the village is mentioned as "Durnuk" in records from 1928.

== Population ==
Historical population
Year	Pop.	±% p.a.
1990	833	—
1997	743	−1.62%
2007	689	−0.75%
2012	635	−1.62%
2017	722	+2.60%
2022	561	−4.92%
Source: 1990 census, 1997 census and TÜIK (2007-2022)
