= Aşağıdere, Ulus =

Aşağıdere
- Village
- Location within Turkey
- Coordinates: 41.5894°N 32.5784°E
- Country: Turkey
- Province: Bartın
- District: Ulus
- Population (2021): 208
- Time zone: UTC+3 (TRT)

Aşağıdere is a village in the Ulus District, Bartın Province, Turkey. Its population is 208 (2021).
