= Ahmetpaşa, Bartın =

Ahmetpaşa
- Village
- Location within Turkey
- Coordinates: 41.5648°N 32.2640°E
- Country: Turkey
- Province: Bartın
- District: Bartın
- Population (2021): 343
- Time zone: UTC+3 (TRT)

Ahmetpaşa is a village in the Bartın District, Bartın Province, Turkey. Its population is 343 (2021).
