= Akbaba, Bartın =

Akbaba
- Village
- Location within Turkey
- Coordinates: 41.5647°N 32.1711°E
- Country: Turkey
- Province: Bartın
- District: Bartın
- Population (2021): 458
- Time zone: UTC+3 (TRT)

Akbaba is a village in the Bartın District, Bartın Province, Turkey. Its population is 458 (2021).
