= Yeğenli, Bartın =

Village in Turkey

Yeğenli
- Village
- Location within Turkey
- Coordinates: 41°31′14″N 32°22′25″E
- Country: Turkey
- Province: Bartın
- District: Bartın
- Population (2021): 700
- Time zone: UTC+3 (TRT)

Yeğenli is a village in the Bartın District, Bartın Province, Turkey. Its population is 700 (2021).
