= Karayakup, Erdemli =

Karayakup
- Neighbourhood
- Location within Turkey
- Coordinates: 36°46′N 34°22′E
- Country: Turkey
- Province: Mersin
- District: Erdemli
- Elevation: 500 m (1,600 ft)
- Population (2022): 616
- Time zone: UTC+3 (TRT)
- Postal code: 33730
- Area code: 0324

Karayakup is a neighbourhood in the municipality and district of Erdemli, Mersin Province, Turkey. Its population is 616 (2022). The village is situated in the peneplane area to the north of Çukurova (Cilicia) plains. The distance to Erdemli is 23 kilometres (14 mi) and the distance to Mersin is 60 kilometres (37 mi).

== History ==
The area around the village was inhabited during the ancient and medieval ages. There are two castle ruins to the south of the village, Gökçam and Fanazlık. The village itself was founded four centuries ago by a Turkmen clan from Karaman. The village was named after the leader of the clan. During the Turkish War of Independence in 1920s, almost all village men were enlisted and a woman named Elif was appointed as the muhtar (village head) of the village making her the first female muhtar around. In 1989 a neighbourhood of the village named Sinap was issued from Karayakup.

== Economy ==
The main economic activity is farming. Various vegetables and fruits are produced. Tomato, cucumber, olive and grapes are among the main crops. Sheep breeding and beekeeping are other activities.
