= Şirinköy, Bartın =

Şirinköy
- Village
- Location within Turkey
- Country: Turkey
- Province: Bartın
- District: Bartın
- Population (2021): 148
- Time zone: UTC+3 (TRT)

Şirinköy is a village in the Bartın District, Bartın Province, Turkey. Its population is 148 (2021).
