= Bartın District =

District of Bartın Province, Turkey

- District
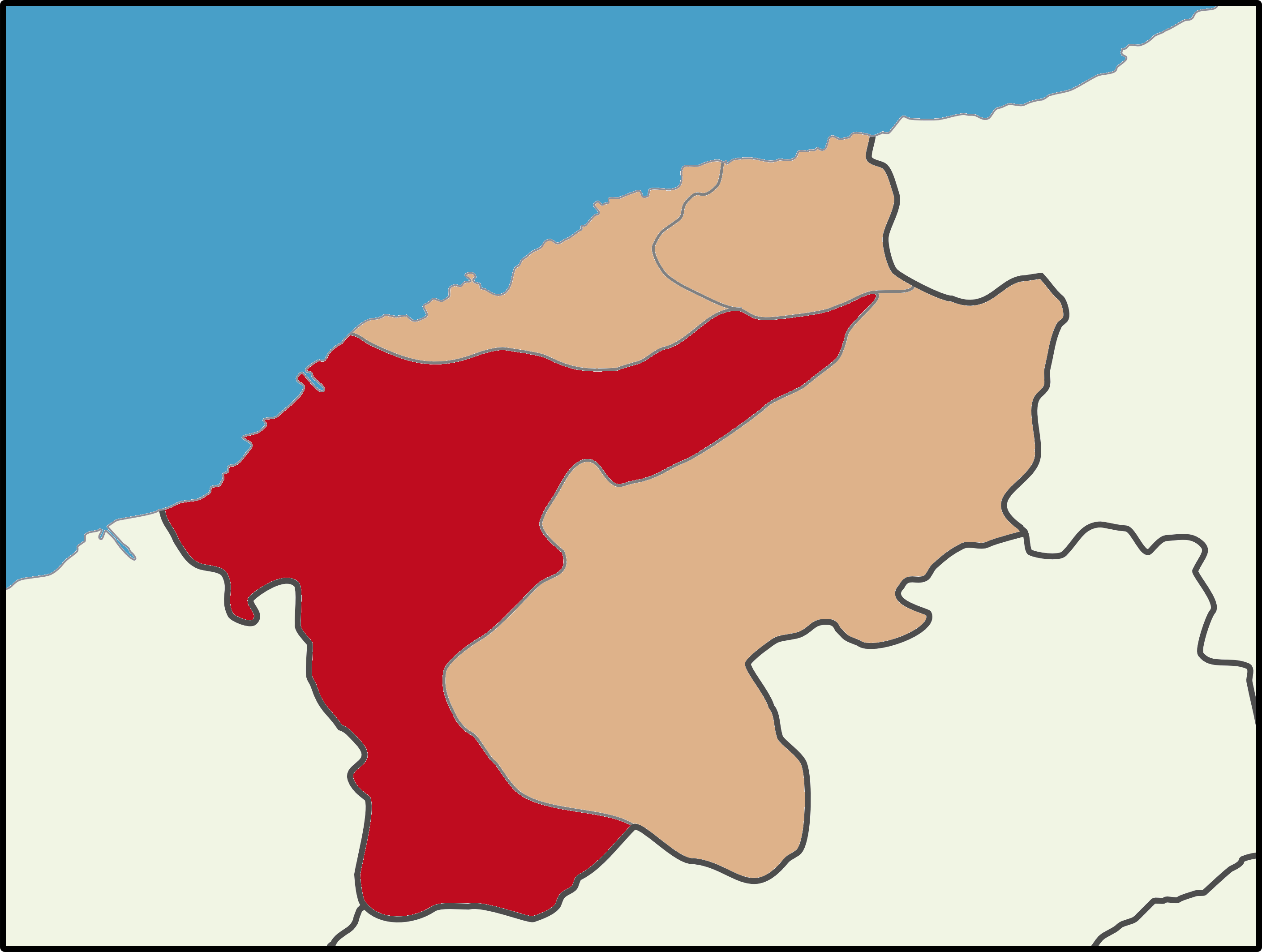
- Map showing Bartın District in Bartın Province

- Location in Turkey
- Coordinates: 41°38′N 32°20′E
- Country: Turkey
- Province: Bartın
- Seat: Bartın
- Area: 1,091 km^{2} (421 sq mi)
- Population (2024): 206.715
  - Density: 0.19/km^{2} (0.49/sq mi)
- Time zone: UTC+3 (TRT)

Bartın District (also: Merkez, meaning "central") is a district of the Bartın Province of Turkey. Its seat is the city Bartın. Its area is 1,091 km^{2}, and its population is 159,811 (2021).

== Composition ==
There are three municipalities in Bartın District:

- Bartın
- Hasankadı
- Kozcağız

There are 134 villages in Bartın District:

- Ahmetpaşa
- Akağaç
- Akbaba
- Akbaş
- Akçalı
- Akçamescit
- Akgöz
- Akıncılar
- Akmanlar
- Akpınar
- Alibaş
- Arıönü
- Arıt
- Aşağıdere
- Avgölü
- Aydınlar
- Bakioğlu
- Balat
- Barkaçboz
- Başoğlu
- Bayıryüzü
- Bedil
- Beşköprü
- Budakdüzü
- Büyükkıran
- Büyükkızılkum
- Çakırdemirci
- Çakırkadı
- Çakırömerağa
- Çamaltı
- Çamlık
- Çaybükü
- Çayır
- Celilbeyoğlu
- Çeştepe
- Çiftlikköy
- Cöcü
- Çöpbey
- Çukurbük
- Dallıca
- Darıören
- Derbent
- Dırazlar
- Doğaşı
- Ecikler
- Ellibaş
- Epçiler
- Epçilerkadı
- Esbey
- Esenyurt
- Eskiemirler
- Eskihamidiye
- Eyüpoğlu
- Fırınlı
- Gençali
- Geriş
- Gerişkatırcı
- Gökçekıran
- Gözpınar
- Gürpınar
- Güzelcehisar
- Hacıhatipoğlu
- Hacıosmanoğlu
- Hanyeri
- Hasanefendi
- Hasanlar
- Hatipler
- Hıdırlar
- Hocaoğlu
- İmamlar
- Kabagöz
- Kaman
- Karacaoğlu
- Karahüseyinli
- Karainler
- Karaköyşeyhler
- Karamazak
- Karasu
- Karayakup
- Karşıyaka
- Kaşbaşı
- Kayacılar
- Kayadibi
- Kayadibiçavuş
- Kayadibikavlak
- Kışlaköy
- Kızılelma
- Kocareis
- Köyyeri
- Küçükkızılkum
- Kumaçorak
- Kümesler
- Kurt
- Kutlubeydemirci
- Kutlubeytabaklar
- Kutlubeyyazıcılar
- Mamak
- Mekeçler
- Muratbey
- Okçular
- Ören
- Özbaşı
- Şabankadı
- Şahin
- Şahne
- Saraylı
- Şarköy
- Serdar
- Sipahiler
- Şiremirtabaklar
- Şirinköy
- Sofular
- Söğütlü
- Sülek
- Sütlüce
- Tabanözü
- Tasmacı
- Terkehaliller
- Terkehatipler
- Topluca
- Turanlar
- Tuzcular
- Uğurlar
- Ulugeçitambarcı
- Ulugeçitkadı
- Uluköy
- Ustaoğlu
- Yanaz
- Yeğenli
- Yenihamidiye
- Yeniköy
- Yeşilkaya
- Yeşilyurt
- Yukarışeyhler
