= Sülek, Bartın =

Sülek
- Village
- Location within Turkey
- Coordinates: 41.46806°N 32.24722°E
- Country: Turkey
- Province: Bartın
- District: Bartın
- Population (2021): 673
- Time zone: UTC+3 (TRT)

Sülek is a village in the Bartın District, Bartın Province, Turkey. Its population is 673 (2021).
