= Dallıca, Bartın =

Dallıca
- Village
- Location within Turkey
- Coordinates: 41.660278°N 32.325833°E
- Country: Turkey
- Province: Bartın
- District: Bartın
- Population (2021): 516
- Time zone: UTC+3 (TRT)

Dallıca is a village in the Bartın District, Bartın Province, Turkey. Its population is 516 (2021).
