= Hıdırlar, Bartın =

Hıdırlar
- Village
- Location within Turkey
- Country: Turkey
- Province: Bartın
- District: Bartın
- Population (2021): 727
- Time zone: UTC+3 (TRT)

Hıdırlar is a village in the Bartın District, Bartın Province, Turkey. Its population is 727 (2021).
