= Aşağıdere, Bartın =

Aşağıdere
- Village
- Location within Turkey
- Coordinates: 41.4045°N 32.3924°E
- Country: Turkey
- Province: Bartın
- District: Bartın
- Population (2021): 245
- Time zone: UTC+3 (TRT)

Aşağıdere is a village in the Bartın District, Bartın Province, Turkey. Its population is 245 (2021).
