= Hasankadı =

- Municipality
- Location in Turkey
- Coordinates: 41°20′N 32°23′E
- Country: Turkey
- Province: Bartın
- District: Bartın
- Elevation: 405 m (1,329 ft)
- Population (2021): 2,081
- Time zone: UTC+3 (TRT)
- Postal code: 74400
- Area code: 0378

Hasankadı is a town (belde) and municipality in the Bartın District, Bartın Province, Turkey. Its population is 2,081 (2021). It is situated in the forests along the Günye creek. The distance to Bartın is about 40 kilometres (25 mi). According to town page, the town was founded by people from Zonguldak, coastal region who were forced to work in coal mines by foreign companies during the Ottoman Empire era. The settlement was named as Hasankadı referring to a kadı ("judge") working in the settlement.
