= Abdipaşa, Ulus =

Abdipaşa
- Municipality
- Location in Turkey
- Coordinates: 41°31′N 32°34′E
- Country: Turkey
- Province: Bartın
- District: Ulus
- Population (2021): 2,678
- Time zone: UTC+3 (TRT)

Abdipaşa is a town (belde) and municipality in the Ulus District, Bartın Province, Turkey. Its population is 2,678 (2021). The town consists of the quarters Kadıoğlu, Ulupınar, Yeşilpazar, Derecik and Karadiken.
