= Kozcağız =

- Municipality
- Location in Turkey
- Coordinates: 41°29′N 32°20′E
- Country: Turkey
- Province: Bartın
- District: Bartın
- Elevation: 70 m (230 ft)
- Population (2021): 7,248
- Time zone: UTC+3 (TRT)
- Postal code: 74400
- Area code: 0378

Kozcağız is a town (belde) and municipality in the Bartın District, Bartın Province, Turkey. Its population is 7,248 (2021). It is on the west bank of Kocanaz creek. The distance to Bartın is 20 kilometres (12 mi).
