= Sulek (surname) =

Sulek, Šulek or Sułek are surnames. Notable people with the surname include:

== Šulek ==
- Bogoslav Šulek (1816–1895), Croatian philologist
- Martin Šulek (born 1998), Slovak footballer
- Miroslav Šulek (born 1993), Slovak cross-country skier
- Peter Šulek (born 1988), Slovak footballer
- Stjepan Šulek (1914–1986), Croatian musician

== Sułek ==
- Adrianna Sułek (born 1999), Polish athlete
- Leszek Sułek (born 1954), Polish politician
