= Bartın =

City in northern Turkey

- Municipality
- Location within Turkey
- Coordinates: 41°38′04″N 32°20′15″E
- Country: Turkey
- Province: Bartın
- District: Bartın

Government
  - Mayor: Muhammet Rıza Yalçınkaya (CHP)
- Elevation: 27 m (89 ft)
- Population (2021): 81,692
- Time zone: UTC+3 (TRT)
- Postal code: 74100
- Area code: 0378
- Climate: Cfa
- Website: www.bartin.bel.tr

Bartın is a city in northern Turkey, near the Black Sea. It is the seat of Bartın Province and Bartın District. Its population is 81,692 (2021).

Formerly a district of Zonguldak Province, Bartın was made into a province seat in 1991. The city is situated 14 kilometres (8.7 mi) inland on the Bartın River (Bartın Çayı) that is navigable for vessels between the city and the Black Sea coast. Bartın River is the only navigable river for vessels in Turkey.

== History ==
The history of the antique Parthenios city (Παρθένιος in Greek), or Parthenia, dates back to 1200 BC, when its area was inhabited by the Kaskian tribe. In the following centuries, the region had entered under the dominance of Hittites, Phrygians, Cimmerians, Lydians, Greeks, and Persians. Later, it was part of the Roman Empire and then of the Byzantine Empire, until it fell to the Seljuk Turks and the Candaroğulları State between the 11th and the 13th centuries AD. Bartın was conquered by the Ottoman sultan Mehmet II in 1460. In the late 19th and early 20th century, Bartın was part of the Kastamonu Vilayet of the Ottoman Empire.

== Main sights ==
Bartın is a member of the Norwich-based European Association of Historic Towns and Regions (EAHTR).

The wooden Bartın houses display the architectural characteristics of the art movements after the Tanzimat Fermanı (Reforms Decree).

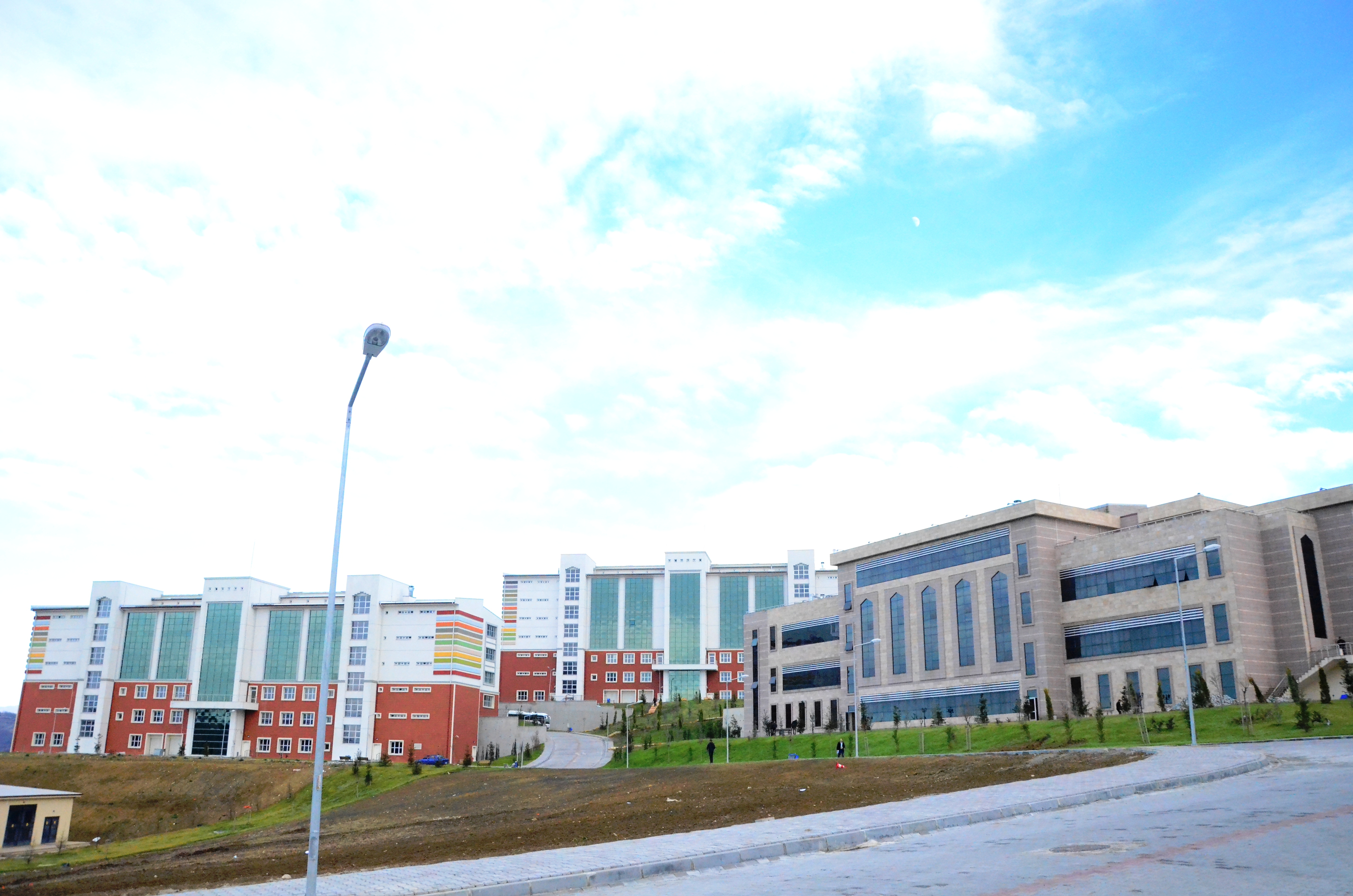
Bartın University Campus

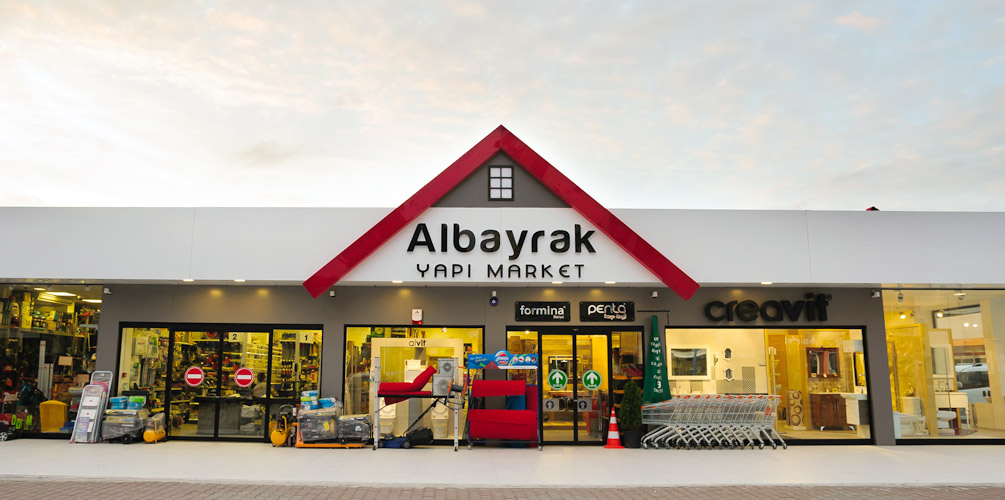
A market in Bartın

== Geography ==
The city of Bartın consists of 22 quarters:

- Kırtepe
- Kemerköprü
- Gölbucağı
- Orta
- Okulak
- Köyortası
- Orduyeri
- Tuna
- Demirciler
- Aladağ
- Karaköy
- Çaydüzü
- Esentepe
- Cumhuriyet
- Hürriyet
- Karaçay
- Ağdacı
- Gecen
- Gürgenpınarı
- Şiremirçavuş
- Uzunöz
- Yıldız

=== Climate ===
Bartın has a borderline oceanic (Cfb) and humid subtropical (Cfa) climate under the Köppen classification, or an oceanic climate (Do) under the Trewartha classification. Summers are warm, the average temperature is around 22.5 °C (72.5 °F) in July and August. Winters are cool and damp, and the average temperature is around 4 °C (39 °F) in January and February.

For a long time, Bartın city center was considered to only have an oceanic climate (Cfb), with its warmest month being well below the 22 °C (72 °F) threshold, yet in recent decades climate change and global warming has been contributing to its classification slowly turning humid subtropical (Cfa) and therefore the city center is currently classified as borderline oceanic-humid subtropical.

Precipitation is heaviest in autumn and early winter and lightest in spring. Snowfall is somewhat common between the months of December and March, snowing for a week or two, and it can be heavy once it snows.

Highest recorded temperature: 42.8 °C (109.0 °F) on 13 July 2000
Lowest recorded temperature: −18.6 °C (−1.5 °F) on 23 February 1985

Climate data for Bartın (1991–2020, extremes 1961–2025)
Month	Jan	Feb	Mar	Apr	May	Jun	Jul	Aug	Sep	Oct	Nov	Dec	Year
Record high °C (°F)	25.0 (77.0)	27.2 (81.0)	31.8 (89.2)	34.1 (93.4)	39.1 (102.4)	38.0 (100.4)	42.8 (109.0)	41.3 (106.3)	40.5 (104.9)	37.1 (98.8)	31.2 (88.2)	27.7 (81.9)	42.8 (109.0)
Mean daily maximum °C (°F)	9.3 (48.7)	10.8 (51.4)	13.6 (56.5)	18.1 (64.6)	22.5 (72.5)	26.4 (79.5)	28.8 (83.8)	29.2 (84.6)	25.6 (78.1)	21.1 (70.0)	16.1 (61.0)	11.3 (52.3)	19.4 (66.9)
Daily mean °C (°F)	4.1 (39.4)	4.9 (40.8)	7.4 (45.3)	11.4 (52.5)	15.9 (60.6)	20.2 (68.4)	22.6 (72.7)	22.6 (72.7)	18.5 (65.3)	14.4 (57.9)	9.1 (48.4)	5.7 (42.3)	13.1 (55.6)
Mean daily minimum °C (°F)	0.5 (32.9)	0.7 (33.3)	2.6 (36.7)	5.8 (42.4)	10.2 (50.4)	14.1 (57.4)	16.3 (61.3)	16.4 (61.5)	12.8 (55.0)	9.5 (49.1)	4.5 (40.1)	1.9 (35.4)	7.9 (46.2)
Record low °C (°F)	−15.4 (4.3)	−18.6 (−1.5)	−13.1 (8.4)	−4.5 (23.9)	−1.3 (29.7)	5.3 (41.5)	8.0 (46.4)	6.7 (44.1)	1.5 (34.7)	−3.2 (26.2)	−5.6 (21.9)	−10.6 (12.9)	−18.6 (−1.5)
Average precipitation mm (inches)	112.8 (4.44)	87.1 (3.43)	82.9 (3.26)	54.1 (2.13)	55.5 (2.19)	82.4 (3.24)	60.6 (2.39)	78.7 (3.10)	99.7 (3.93)	123.9 (4.88)	108.9 (4.29)	125.8 (4.95)	1,072.4 (42.22)
Average precipitation days	17.07	14.9	14.97	11.8	10.67	9.3	6.67	5.67	9.57	12.2	12.13	17.5	142.4
Average relative humidity (%)	85.5	82.5	79	77.1	78.4	77.5	77	78.4	81.6	84.4	85.3	85.9	81.0
Mean monthly sunshine hours	67.8	91.0	129.6	180.0	227.8	266.4	306.0	290.5	221.4	160.6	113.1	73.7	2,128
Mean daily sunshine hours	2.2	3.2	4.2	6.0	7.4	8.9	9.9	9.4	7.4	5.2	3.8	2.4	5.8
Source 1: Turkish State Meteorological Service
Source 2: NOAA NCEI(humidity, sun 1991-2020)
