= Bartın Province =

Coordinates: 41°36′16″N 32°30′40″E

Bartın Province Bartın ili
- Province
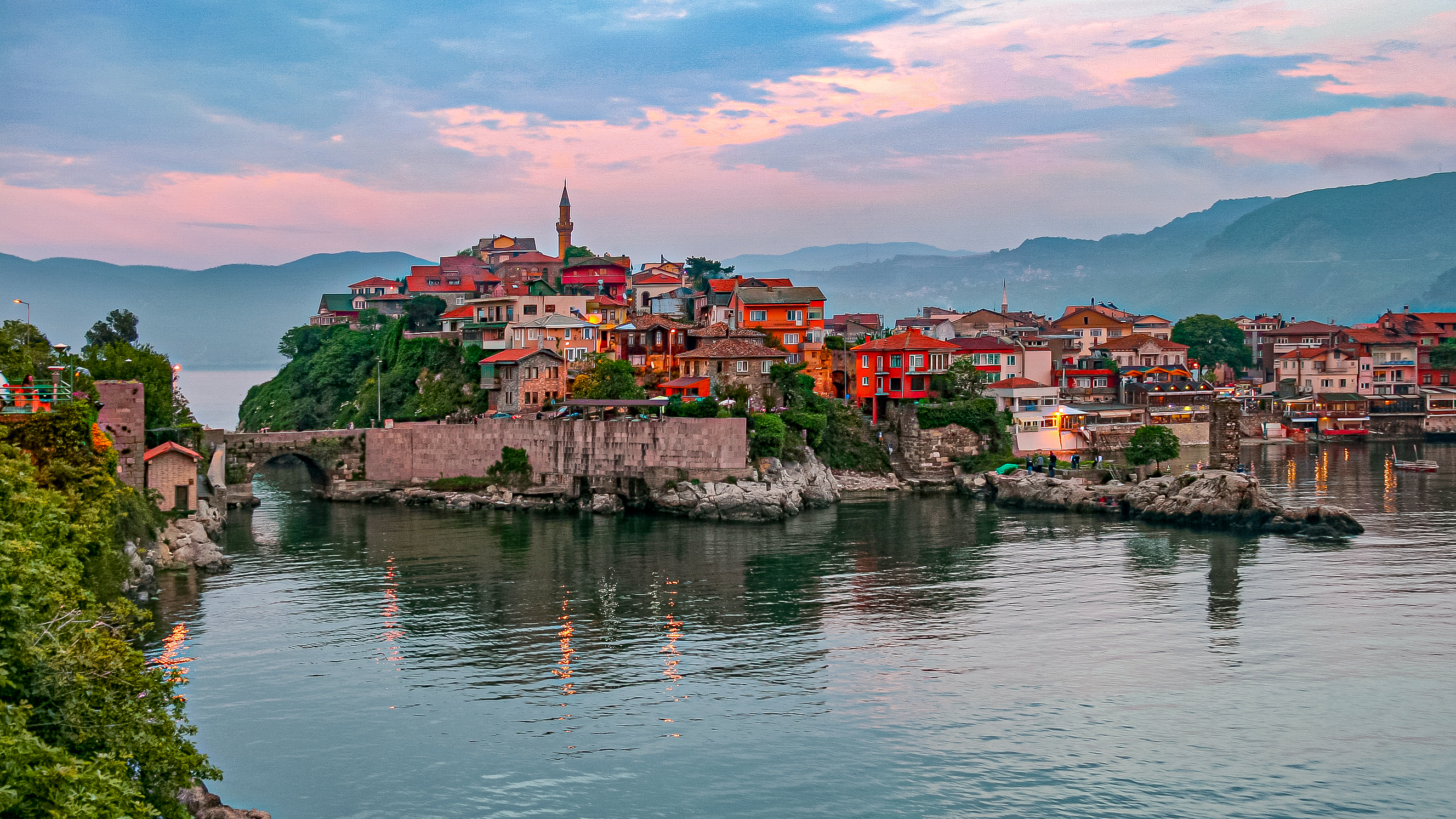
- Amasra

- Location of the province within Turkey
- Country: Turkey
- Seat: Bartın

Government
  - Governor: Nurtaç Arslan
- Area: 2,330 km^{2} (900 sq mi)
- Population (2022): 203,351
  - Density: 87.3/km^{2} (226/sq mi)
- Time zone: UTC+3 (TRT)
- Area code: 0378
- Website: www.bartin.gov.tr

Bartın Province (Turkish: Bartın ili) is a small province in northern Turkey on the Black Sea, surrounding the city of Bartın. Its area is 2,330 km^{2}, and its population is 203,351 (2022). It lies to the east of Zonguldak Province.

The town of Bartın contains a number of very old wooden houses in a style no longer existent in other places.

Bartın province includes the ancient port town of Amasra (Amastris). This town stands on two small fortified islands and contains many interesting old buildings and restaurants.

== Districts ==
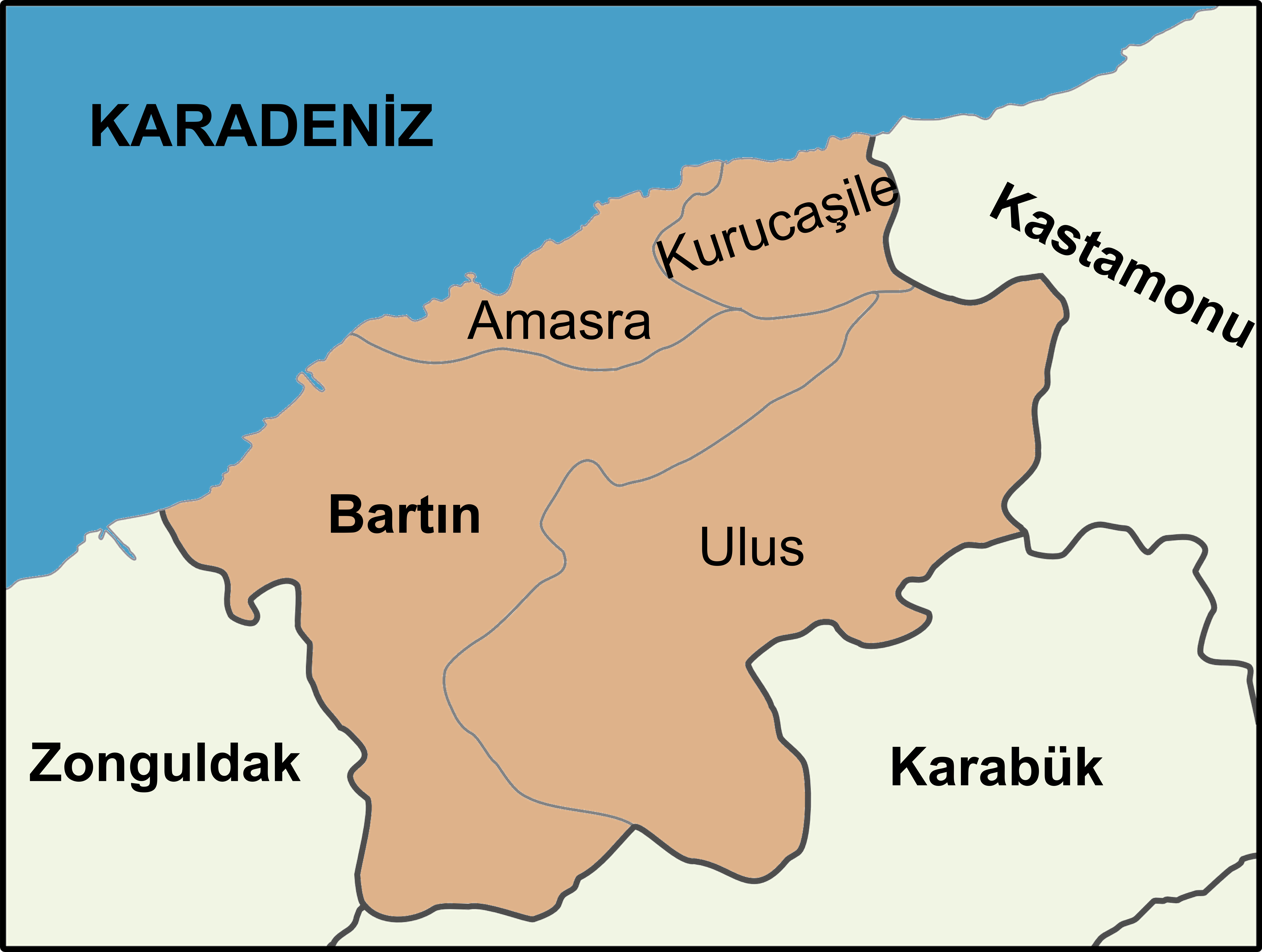

Bartın Province subdivides into four districts (capital district in bold):

- Amasra
- **Bartın**
- Kurucaşile
- Ulus

== See also ==
- Bartın Naval Base
- Kuşkayası Monument
- List of populated places in Bartın Province

== Gallery ==
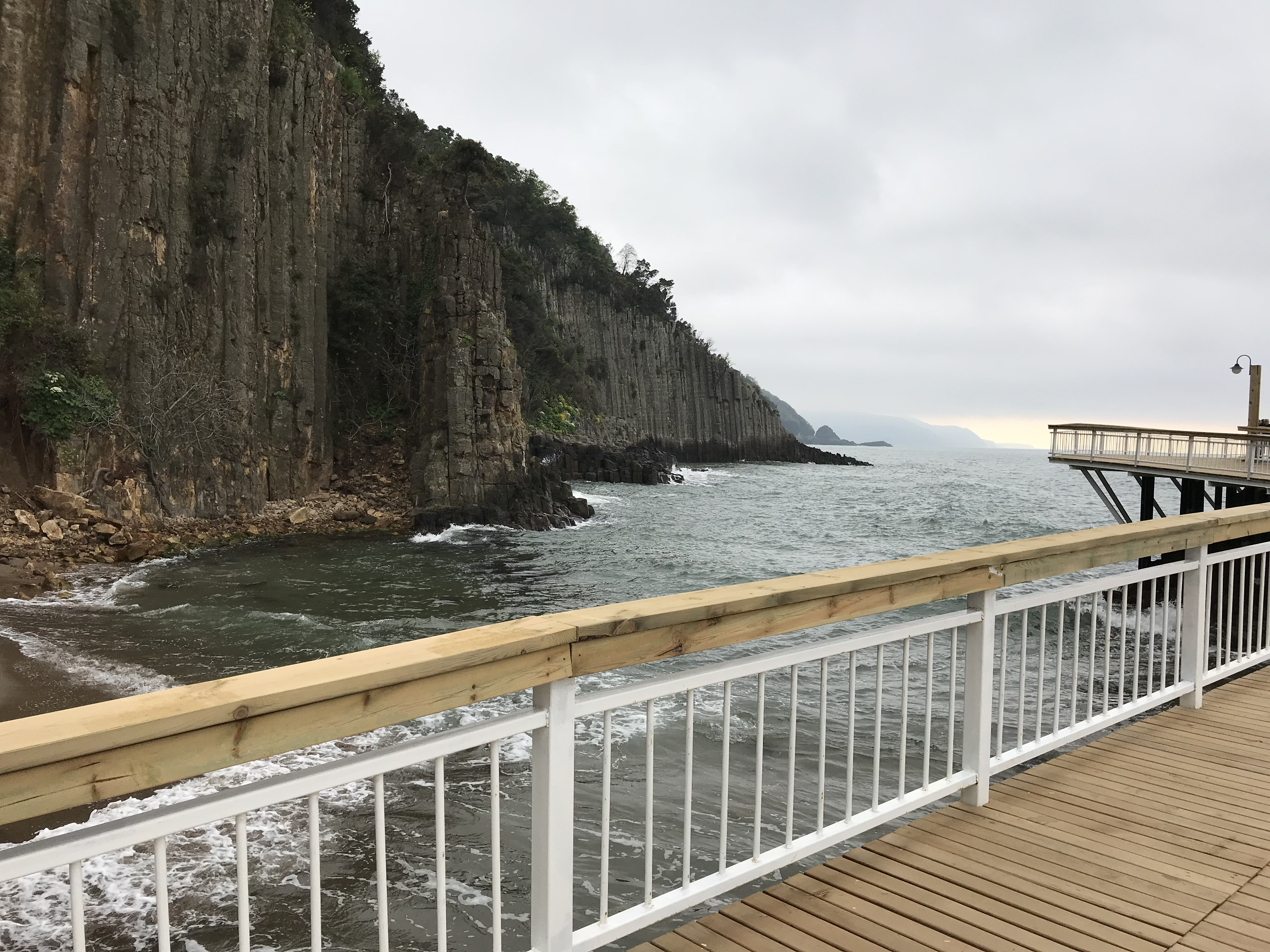
A view from Güzelcehisar/Bartın.

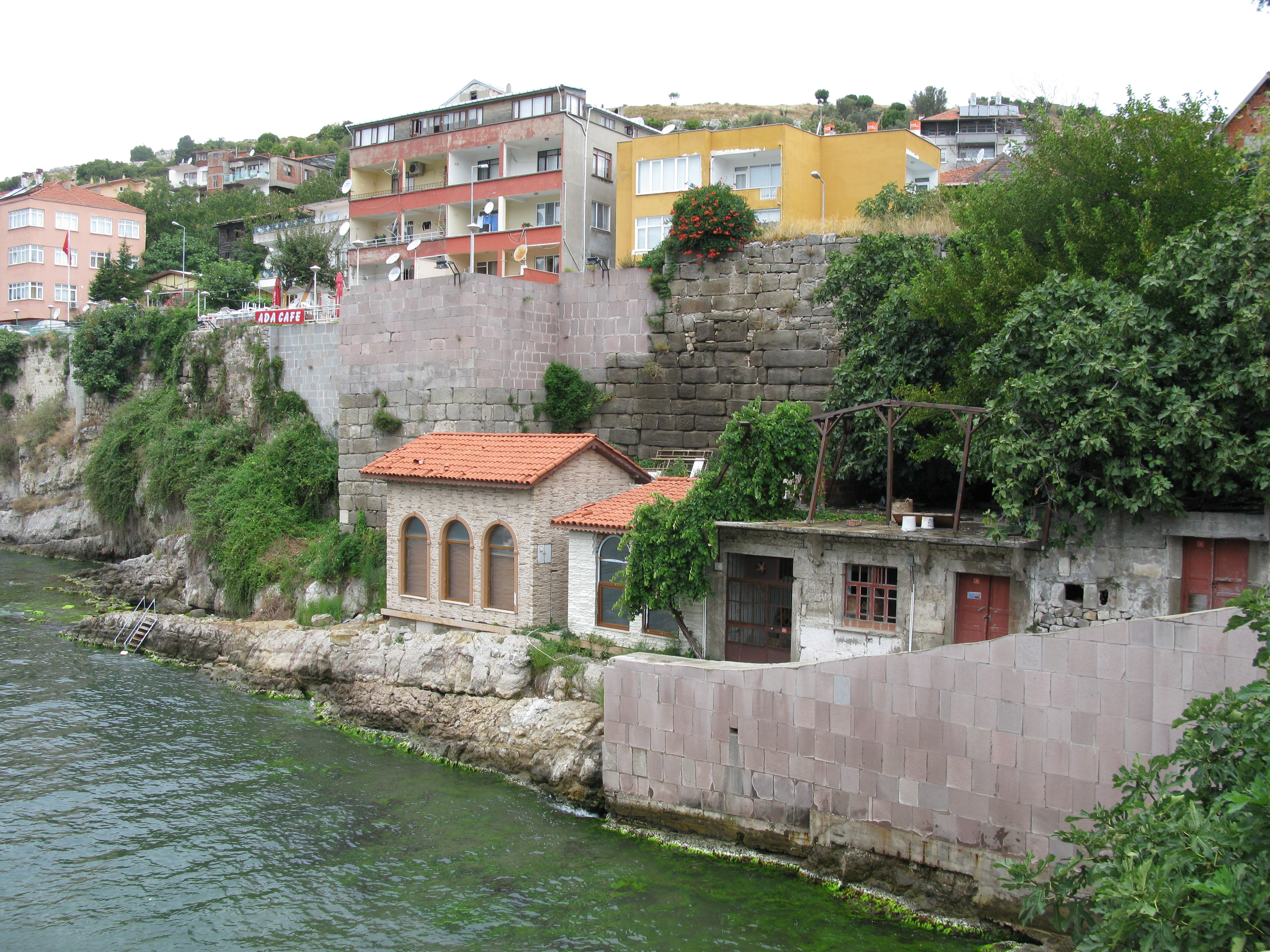
Amasra, view from the bridge

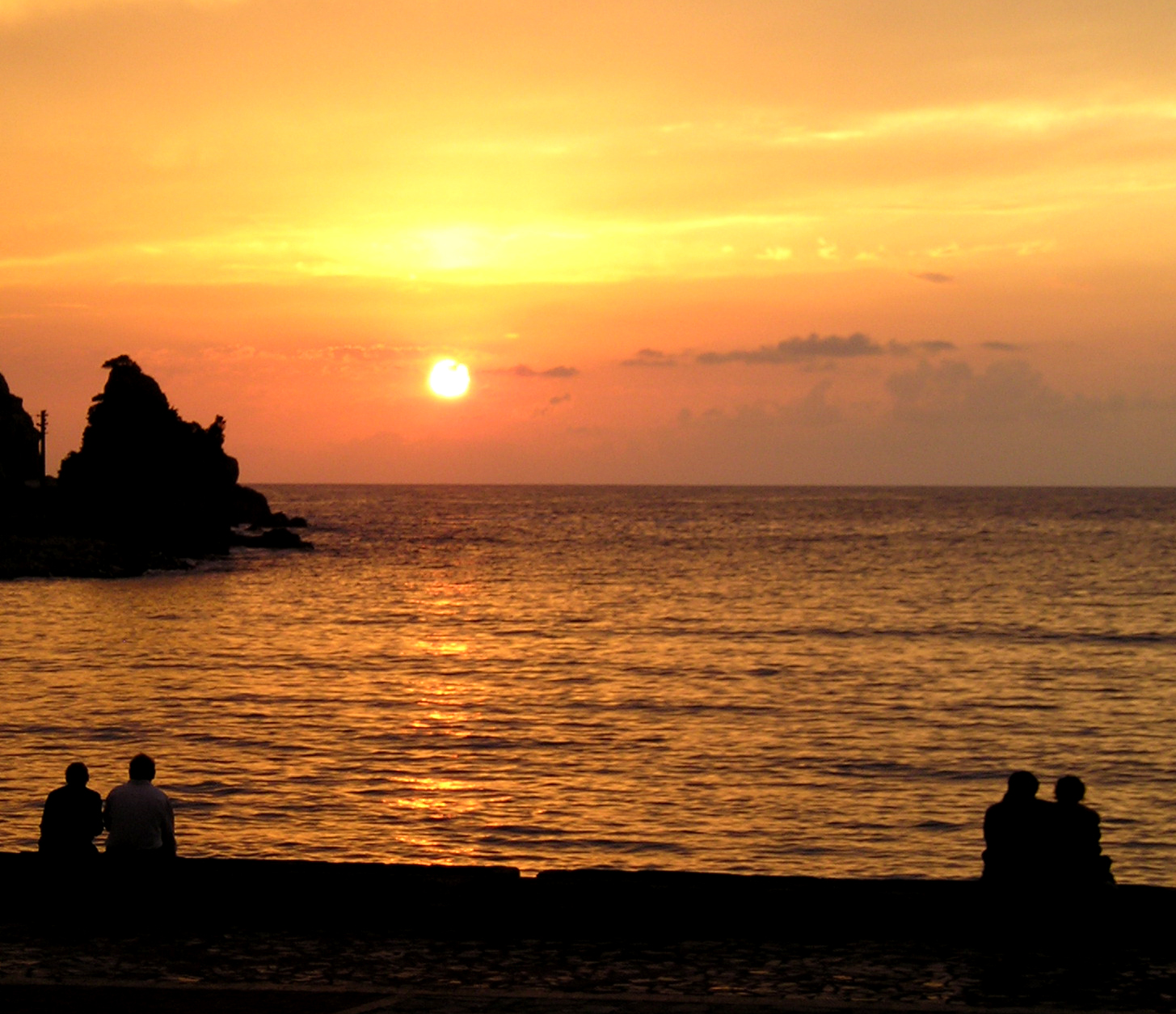
Sunset in Amasra

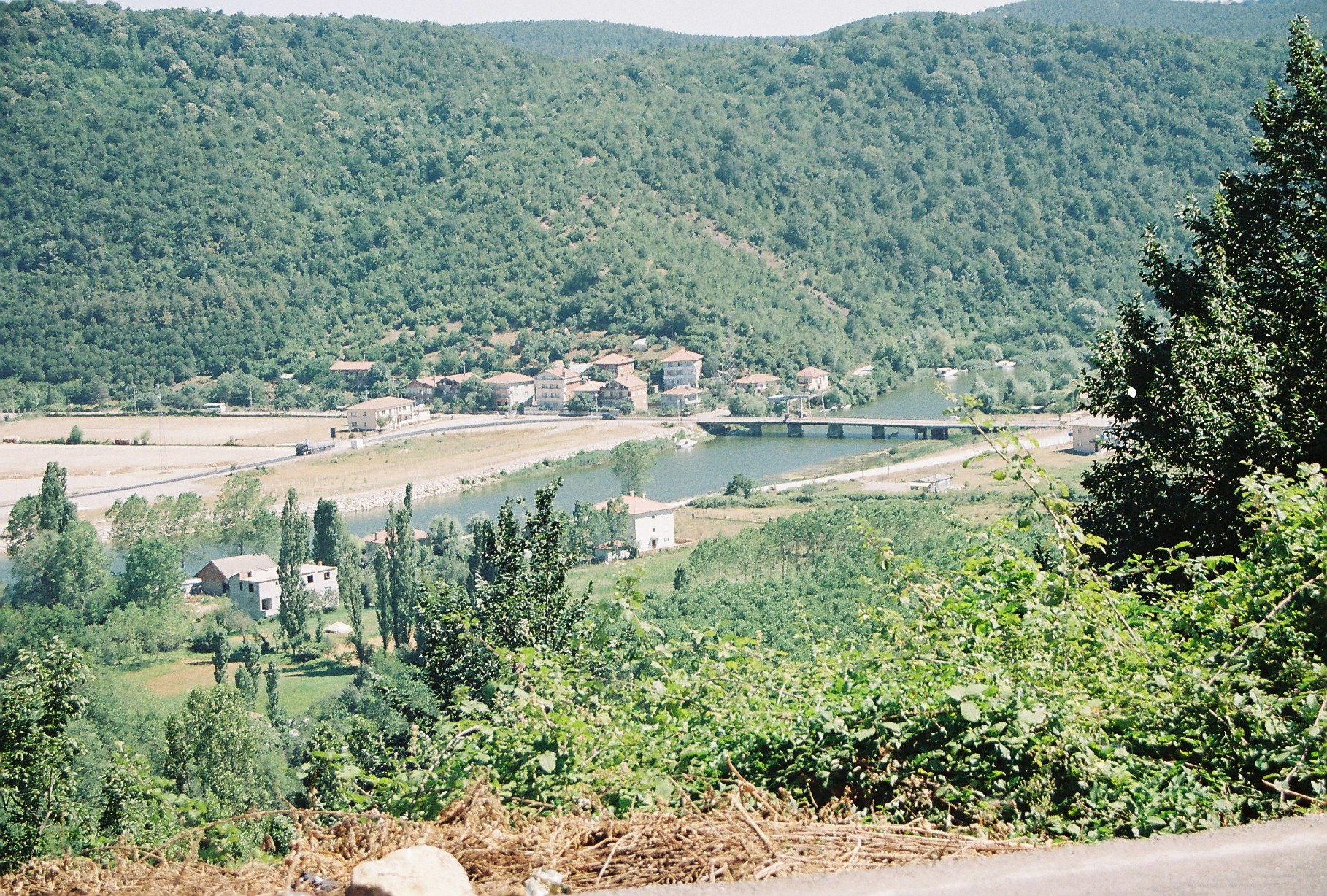
Bartın river, near the Black Sea

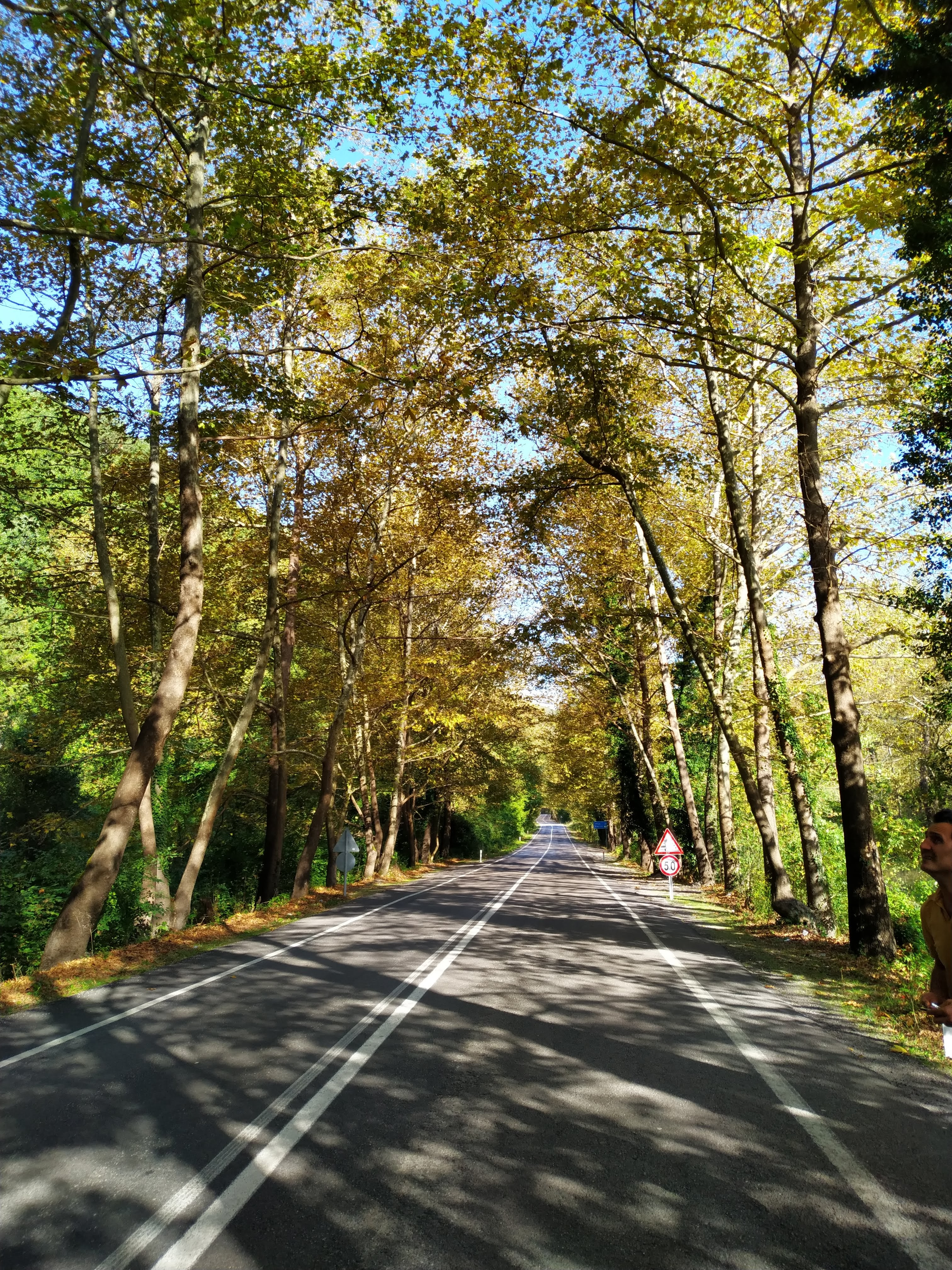
Forest road in Bartın Province
