= Pelitözü =

Pelitözü can refer to:

- Pelitözü, Bilecik
- Pelitözü, Kargı
- Pelitözü, Mudurnu
