= Aşağıköy =

Aşağıköy (literally "lower village") is a Turkish place name that may refer to the following places in Turkey:

- Aşağıköy, Bilecik, a village in the central district (Bilecik) of Bilecik Province
- Aşağıköy, Ulus, a village in the district of Ulus, Bartın Province
