= Taşçılar =

Taşçılar can refer to the following villages in Turkey:

- Taşçılar, Bayburt
- Taşçılar, Bilecik
- Taşçılar, Bolu
- Taşçılar, Çameli
- Taşçılar, Mudurnu
- Taşçılar, Taşköprü
