= İğneciler =

İğneciler can refer to:

- İğneciler, Mudurnu
- İğneciler, Ulus
