= Tokas =

Tokas is a clan of Jats.

== Notable people ==
Notable people with the surname, who may or may not be affiliated with the clan, include:

- Khazan Singh Tokas, swimmer
- Marios Tokas (1954–2008), Cypriot composer of traditional music
- Parmila Tokas, Indian politician
- Rajat Tokas (born 1991), Indian actor
- Vikas Tokas (born 1986), Indian cricketer

== See also ==
- Tokaş, Taşköprü, a village in Turkey
