= Karapürçek (disambiguation) =

Karapürçek can refer to:

- Karapürçek
- Karapürçek, Kargı
- Karapürçek, Taşköprü
