= Akdeğirmen =

Akdeğirmen can refer to the following villages in Turkey:

- Akdeğirmen, Sinanpaşa
- Akdeğirmen, Taşköprü

== See also ==
- Akdeğirmen Dam
