= Kirazcık =

- Village
- Location within Turkey
- Coordinates: 41.276°N 34.291°E
- Country: Turkey
- Province: Kastamonu
- District: Taşköprü
- Population (2022): 84
- Time zone: UTC+3 (TRT)

Kirazcık is a village of Taşköprü District, Kastamonu Province, Turkey. Its population is 84 (2022).

== Geography ==
Kirazcık is 78 km from Kastamonu and 36 km from Taşköprü. Forests cover more than %60 of the total area of the village. Climate of the village is Humid subtropical climate.

== Population ==
Historical population
Year	Pop.	±% p.a.
1997	75	—
2007	56	−2.88%
2012	60	+1.39%
2017	52	−2.82%
2022	84	+10.07%
Source: 1997 census and TÜIK (2007-2022)

== Economy ==
The economy of the village is based on agriculture and animal husbandry.

== Others ==
There is a primary school in the village but not in use today. The village has a drinking water network but does not have a sewer system. The village has electricity and telephone service as well.
