= Ulukaya =

Ulukaya may refer to:

- Ulukaya, Ulus, a village in the District of Ulus, Bartın Province, Turkey
- Hamdi Ulukaya (born 1972), Turkish businessman, entrepreneur, investor, and philanthropist of Kurdish background, founder of Chobani
