= Çaykirpi, Taşköprü =

Village in Turkey

Çaykirpi
- Village
- Location within Turkey
- Coordinates: 41°28′N 34°10′E
- Country: Turkey
- Province: Kastamonu
- District: Taşköprü
- Population (2022): 150
- Time zone: UTC+3 (TRT)

Çaykirpi is a village in the Taşköprü District of Kastamonu Province, Turkey. Its population is 150 (2022).

== Culture ==
Çaykirpi has a festival celebrating halva. The halva festival comes from its ancient traditions. The village has its own specific dishes such as a meal prepared from goose meat, pilaf with duck meat, and food prepared from okra.

== Geography ==
The distances from the cities of Kastamonu and Taşköprü are 49 km and 7 km, respectively. The effect of Black Sea on the climate of the village is considerably high.

== Population ==
The table below shows the number of people living in the village in select year.

Historical population
Year	Pop.	±% p.a.
1985	331	—
1990	347	+0.95%
1997	203	−7.37%
2007	199	−0.20%
2012	179	−2.10%
2017	154	−2.96%
2022	150	−0.52%
Source: Population censuses (1985-1997) and TÜIK (2007-2022)
