= Uzunçam =

Uzunçam can refer to:

- Uzunçam, Mudurnu
- Uzunçam, Nazilli
