= Yeniler, Taşköprü =

Village in Turkey

Yeniler
- Village
- Location in Turkey
- Coordinates: 41°26′58″N 34°17′17″E
- Country: Turkey
- Province: Kastamonu
- District: Taşköprü
- Population (2021): 127
- Time zone: UTC+3 (TRT)

Yeniler is a village in the Taşköprü District of Kastamonu Province in Turkey. Its population is 127 (2021).
