= Garipşah, Taşköprü =

Village in Turkey

Garipşah
- Village
- Location in Turkey
- Coordinates: 41°19′13″N 34°13′12″E
- Country: Turkey
- Province: Kastamonu
- District: Taşköprü
- Population (2021): 81
- Time zone: UTC+3 (TRT)

Garipşah is a village in the Taşköprü District of Kastamonu Province in Turkey. Its population is 81 (2021).
