= Yavuç, Taşköprü =

Village in Turkey

Yavuç
- Village
- Location in Turkey
- Coordinates: 41°26′06″N 34°02′13″E
- Country: Turkey
- Province: Kastamonu
- District: Taşköprü
- Population (2021): 274
- Time zone: UTC+3 (TRT)

Yavuç is a village in the Taşköprü District of Kastamonu Province in Turkey. Its population is 274 (2021).
