= Dağyolu, Mudurnu =

Dağyolu
- Village
- Location within Turkey
- Coordinates: 40.4307°N 31.4206°E
- Country: Turkey
- Province: Bolu
- District: Mudurnu
- Population (2021): 58
- Time zone: UTC+3 (TRT)

Dağyolu is a village in the Mudurnu District, Bolu Province, Turkey. Its population is 58 (2021).
