= Göncek, Mudurnu =

Göncek
- Village
- Location within Turkey
- Coordinates: 40°31′28″N 31°21′21″E
- Country: Turkey
- Province: Bolu
- District: Mudurnu
- Population (2021): 105
- Time zone: UTC+3 (TRT)

Göncek is a village in the Mudurnu District, Bolu Province, Turkey. Its population is 105 (2021).
