= Sarpıncık, Mudurnu =

Village in Turkey

Sarpıncık
- Village
- Country: Turkey
- Province: Bolu
- District: Mudurnu
- Population (2021): 113
- Time zone: UTC+3 (TRT)

Sarpıncık is a village in the Mudurnu District of Bolu Province in Turkey. Its population is 113 (2021).
