= Güveytepe, Mudurnu =

Village in Turkey

Güveytepe
- Village
- Location in Turkey
- Coordinates: 40°30′N 31°00′E
- Country: Turkey
- Province: Bolu
- District: Mudurnu
- Population (2021): 252
- Time zone: UTC+3 (TRT)

Güveytepe is a village in the Mudurnu District of Bolu Province in Turkey. Its population is 252 (2021).
