= Vakıfbelören, Taşköprü =

Village in Turkey

Vakıfbelören
- Village
- Location in Turkey
- Coordinates: 41°29′49″N 34°15′44″E
- Country: Turkey
- Province: Kastamonu
- District: Taşköprü
- Population (2021): 257
- Time zone: UTC+3 (TRT)

Vakıfbelören is a village in the Taşköprü District of Kastamonu Province in Turkey. Its population is 257 (2021).
