= Bilecik =

City in northwestern Turkey

- Municipality
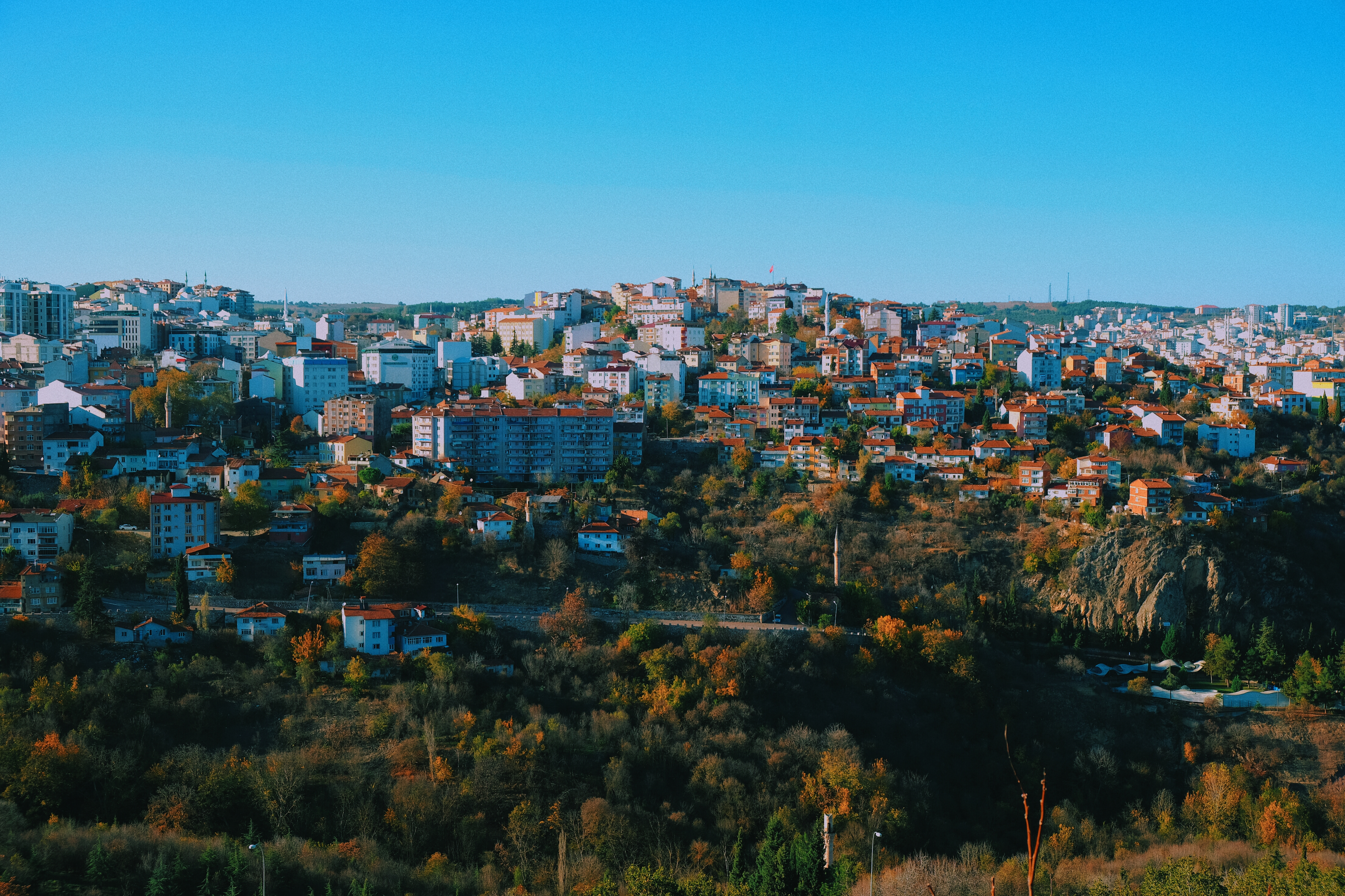
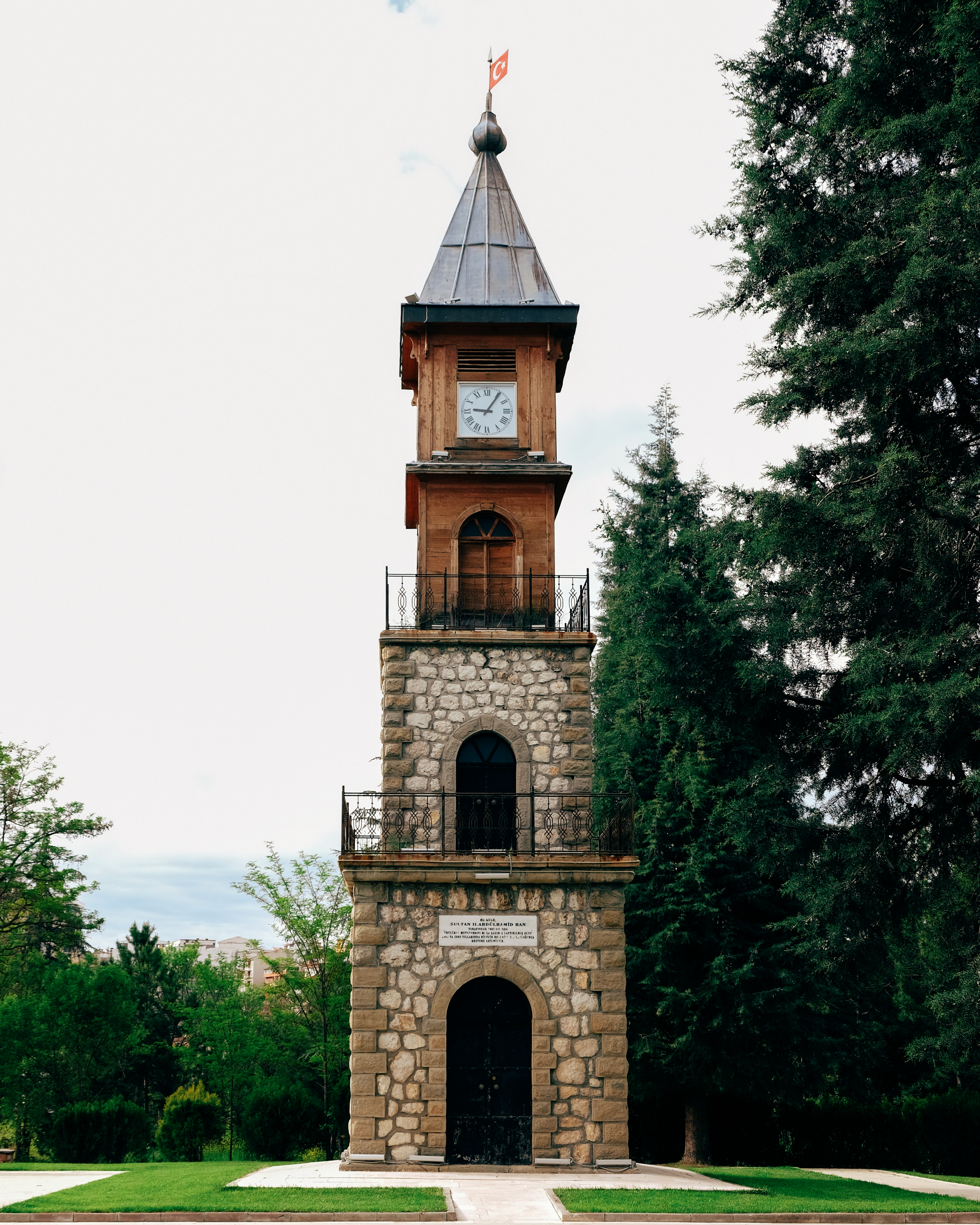
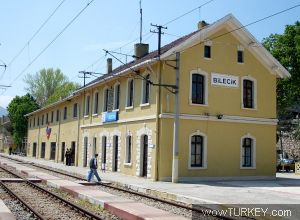
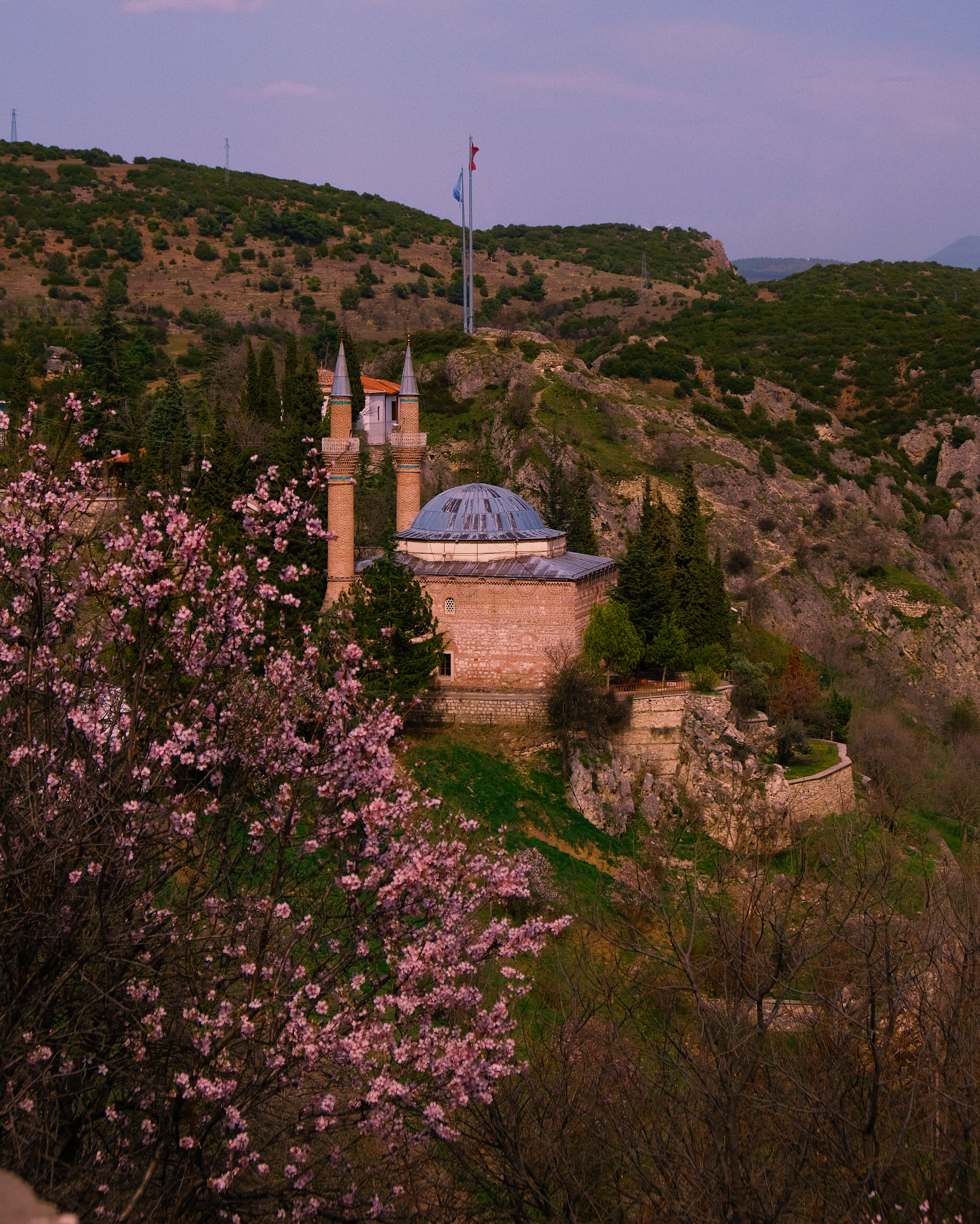
- Panorama of Bilecik Clock Tower Bilecik Railway Station Türbe of Sheikh Edebali and Orhan Gazi Mosque

- Coat of arms

- Location within Turkey Location within Marmara
- Coordinates: 40°08′35″N 29°58′45″E
- Country: Turkey
- Province: Bilecik
- District: Bilecik

Government
  - Mayor: Melek Mızrak Subaşı (CHP)
- Population (2025): 71,594
- Time zone: UTC+3 (TRT)
- Postal code: 11000
- Area code: 0228
- Website: www.bilecik.bel.tr

Bilecik is a city in northwestern Anatolia, Turkey. It is the seat of Bilecik Province and Bilecik District. Its population is 74,457 (2021). The mayor is Melek Mızrak Subaşı (CHP).

The town is famous for its numerous restored Turkish houses. It is increasingly becoming more attractive to tourists. With its rich architectural heritage, Bilecik is a member of the European Association of Historic Towns and Regions. 30 kilometres (19 miles) southeast from Bilecik is Söğüt, a small town, where the Ottoman Empire was founded in 1299 under the Turkoman chief Osman Gazi.

== History ==
=== Prehistory ===
Turan Efe et al. reported two prehistoric settlements in the immediate vicinity of modern Bilecik. The first is located in the Bahçelievler neighborhood, about 100 m off the main street heading north to Gülümbe. The site was discovered when the land across the street was being excavated for the construction of an apartment building. The Bahçelievler settlement appears to have consisted of a single stratum, corresponding to the Classic Fikirtepe phase of the Late Neolithic. The second site is a höyük (mound) located at a site called Çiftlik Alanı, just west of the modern town of Bilecik, on the road to Çakırpınar overlooking the Hamsu Dere stream. Associated materials were mainly dated to the Early Bronze Age III period, with a lesser amount of Early Bronze Age II material. İnegöl Gray Ware was especially predominant among these finds.

=== Roman and Byzantine archaeology ===
An assemblage of Roman stones exists at Bilecik today, but these were originally gathered from other places, so they cannot be taken as evidence of a settlement here during the Roman or early Byzantine periods. However, there is clear archaeological evidence of a settlement at Bilecik by the 1200s and early 1300s, at the very end of Byzantine rule in the region. On a rocky peak near the modern town are the foundations of a Byzantine fortress. Within its enclosing walls, and especially at its "foot" by the lower town, a number of late Byzantine (i.e. 13th/early 14th centuries) and early Ottoman ceramics have been found among the stone blocks and glass fragments. Also, at the Çiftlik Alanı site west of Bilecik proper, Efe et al. reported the presence of unspecified Byzantine material.

=== Recorded history ===
Bilecik's recorded history begins with the Ottoman conquest, at the turn of the 14th century. It is necessary to assume that Belokome was one of the Serbian or Bulgarian settlements or castle settled in this region by Byzantine Empire in the late 12th century and that the name Belokome was pronounced in the Slavic language. (Instead of Bilecik, the Greek name of the region should have taken a form like *Vilegüme/Veligöme in Turkish. "Belo" means "white" in Bulgarian and Serbian. ) According to Aşıkpaşazade's semi-legendary account, Osman I captured the fortress of Bilecik in 699 AH (1299-1300 CE), and the town thus became part of the nascent Ottoman Empire. Bilecik is sometimes identified, based on a vague phonetic resemblance, with the attested Byzantine village of Belokomis which is mentioned as being captured by "Atman" (Osman) in 1304, but Klaus Belke dismisses this as geographically impossible.

From 1867 until 1922, Bilecik was part of Hüdavendigâr vilayet.

== Culture ==
Bilecik has been nominated as the most irrelevant province in the popular Turkish internet dictionary Ekşi Sözlük. This article sparked an online debate regarding the validity and reality of Bilecik as an actual province.

== Geography ==
Bilecik is located in a mountainous area west of the Karasu, a left-hand tributary of the Sakarya River. It is located in the Southern Marmara section of the Marmara region. It is one of the least populated provincial capitals in Turkey. Bilecik consists of the quarters Pelitözü, Aşağıköy, Osmangazi, Orhangazi, Cumhuriyet, Gazipaşa, Ismetpaşa, Istasyon, Istiklal, Beşiktaş, Hürriyet, Bahcelievler and Ertuğrulgazi.

=== Landforms ===
Mountains cover 32% percent of the province.

=== Climate ===
Bilecik has a hot summer Mediterranean climate (Köppen climate classification: Csa), or a temperate oceanic climate (Trewartha climate classification: Do), with cool, wet and often snowy winters, and hot and dry summers. Summers are hot and dry with temperatures exceeding 28.0 °C (82.4 °F) during the peak of summer which are the driest months. Winters are cold and it frequently snows between the months of December and March.

Highest recorded temperature:41.0 °C (105.8 °F) on 13 July 2000
Lowest recorded temperature:−16.0 °C (3.2 °F) on 13 January 1950

Climate data for Bilecik (1991–2020, extremes 1939–2023)
Month	Jan	Feb	Mar	Apr	May	Jun	Jul	Aug	Sep	Oct	Nov	Dec	Year
Record high °C (°F)	22.3 (72.1)	24.6 (76.3)	30.2 (86.4)	33.3 (91.9)	36.6 (97.9)	38.2 (100.8)	41.0 (105.8)	40.6 (105.1)	38.4 (101.1)	34.3 (93.7)	28.6 (83.5)	25.0 (77.0)	41.0 (105.8)
Mean daily maximum °C (°F)	6.3 (43.3)	8.5 (47.3)	12.4 (54.3)	17.5 (63.5)	22.7 (72.9)	26.8 (80.2)	29.6 (85.3)	30.0 (86.0)	25.9 (78.6)	20.2 (68.4)	13.7 (56.7)	7.9 (46.2)	18.5 (65.3)
Daily mean °C (°F)	2.7 (36.9)	4.1 (39.4)	7.2 (45.0)	11.6 (52.9)	16.5 (61.7)	20.4 (68.7)	22.9 (73.2)	23.0 (73.4)	19.1 (66.4)	14.4 (57.9)	8.9 (48.0)	4.5 (40.1)	12.9 (55.2)
Mean daily minimum °C (°F)	0.0 (32.0)	0.8 (33.4)	3.2 (37.8)	6.9 (44.4)	11.3 (52.3)	14.8 (58.6)	17.0 (62.6)	17.4 (63.3)	13.9 (57.0)	10.2 (50.4)	5.5 (41.9)	1.9 (35.4)	8.6 (47.5)
Record low °C (°F)	−16.0 (3.2)	−14.3 (6.3)	−11.6 (11.1)	−6.0 (21.2)	1.0 (33.8)	6.0 (42.8)	7.7 (45.9)	8.2 (46.8)	3.2 (37.8)	−0.8 (30.6)	−9.2 (15.4)	−14.5 (5.9)	−16.0 (3.2)
Average precipitation mm (inches)	48.0 (1.89)	44.4 (1.75)	48.7 (1.92)	48.6 (1.91)	43.9 (1.73)	50.6 (1.99)	16.4 (0.65)	11.2 (0.44)	27.0 (1.06)	50.1 (1.97)	37.1 (1.46)	56.1 (2.21)	482.1 (18.98)
Average precipitation days	13.63	13.2	12.7	10.77	10.27	8.67	3.77	3.77	5.6	8.67	9.57	13.43	114
Average snowy days	8	4.7	2.9	0.6	0	0	0	0	0	0	0.7	4	20.9
Average relative humidity (%)	76.9	73.4	68.7	64.9	65	63.9	62	63.2	64.9	70.5	72.2	76.7	68.5
Mean monthly sunshine hours	95.3	108.2	147.4	191.8	246.1	286.3	327.1	308.9	242.3	171.4	126.4	86.2	2,337.4
Mean daily sunshine hours	3.1	3.8	4.8	6.4	8.0	9.6	10.6	10.0	8.1	5.5	4.2	2.8	6.4
Source 1: Turkish State Meteorological Service
Source 2: NOAA NCEI(humidity, sun 1991-2020), Meteomanz(snow days 2013-2023)
