= Kayapınar, Taşköprü =

Village in Turkey

Kayapınar
- Village
- Location in Turkey
- Coordinates: 41°13′57″N 34°17′19″E
- Country: Turkey
- Province: Kastamonu
- District: Taşköprü
- Population (2021): 70
- Time zone: UTC+3 (TRT)

Kayapınar is a village in the Taşköprü District of Kastamonu Province in Turkey. Its population is 70 (2021).
