= Yukarıdere, Ulus =

Yukarıdere
- Village
- Location within Turkey
- Country: Turkey
- Province: Bartın
- District: Ulus
- Population (2021): 158
- Time zone: UTC+3 (TRT)

Yukarıdere is a village in the Ulus District, Bartın Province, Turkey. Its population is 158 (2021).
