= Hocaköy, Ulus =

Hocaköy
- Village
- Location within Turkey
- Coordinates: 41.590°N 32.695°E
- Country: Turkey
- Province: Bartın
- District: Ulus
- Population (2021): 236
- Time zone: UTC+3 (TRT)

Hocaköy is a village in the Ulus District, Bartın Province, Turkey. Its population is 236 (2021).
