= Dağbelören, Taşköprü =

Village in Turkey

Dağbelören
- Village
- Location in Turkey
- Coordinates: 41°18′11″N 34°15′26″E
- Country: Turkey
- Province: Kastamonu
- District: Taşköprü
- Population (2021): 91
- Time zone: UTC+3 (TRT)

Dağbelören is a village in the Taşköprü District of Kastamonu Province in Turkey. Its population is 91 (2021).
