= Güneyören, Ulus =

Güneyören
- Village
- Location within Turkey
- Coordinates: 41°35′N 32°45′E
- Country: Turkey
- Province: Bartın
- District: Ulus
- Population (2021): 237
- Time zone: UTC+3 (TRT)

Güneyören is a village in the Ulus District, Bartın Province, Turkey. Its population is 237 (2021).
