= Gökpınar, Ulus =

Gökpınar
- Village
- Location within Turkey
- Coordinates: 41.6438°N 32.8458°E
- Country: Turkey
- Province: Bartın
- District: Ulus
- Population (2021): 91
- Time zone: UTC+3 (TRT)

Gökpınar is a village in the Ulus District, Bartın Province, Turkey. Its population is 91 (2021).
