= Eskiatça, Taşköprü =

Village in Turkey

Eskiatça
- Village
- Location in Turkey
- Coordinates: 41°31′58″N 34°13′18″E
- Country: Turkey
- Province: Kastamonu
- District: Taşköprü
- Population (2021): 142
- Time zone: UTC+3 (TRT)

Eskiatça is a village in the Taşköprü District of Kastamonu Province in Turkey. Its population is 142 (2021).
