= Şirinler, Ulus =

Şirinler
- Village
- Location within Turkey
- Coordinates: 41°40′N 32°54′E
- Country: Turkey
- Province: Bartın
- District: Ulus
- Population (2021): 155
- Time zone: UTC+3 (TRT)

Şirinler is a village in the Ulus District, Bartın Province, Turkey. Its population is 155 (2021).
