= Hacımusalar, Mudurnu =

Village in Turkey

Hacımusalar
- Village
- Country: Turkey
- Province: Bolu
- District: Mudurnu
- Population (2021): 193
- Time zone: UTC+3 (TRT)

Hacımusalar is a village in the Mudurnu District of Bolu Province in Turkey. Its population is 193 (2021).
