= Kirazcık, Ulus =

Kirazcık
- Village
- Location within Turkey
- Coordinates: 41.6463°N 32.6797°E
- Country: Turkey
- Province: Bartın
- District: Ulus
- Population (2021): 88
- Time zone: UTC+3 (TRT)

Kirazcık is a village in the Ulus District, Bartın Province, Turkey. Its population is 88 (2021).
