= Dorucaşahinci, Ulus =

Dorucaşahinci
- Village
- Location within Turkey
- Coordinates: 41°32′N 32°40′E
- Country: Turkey
- Province: Bartın
- District: Ulus
- Population (2021): 89
- Time zone: UTC+3 (TRT)

Dorucaşahinci is a village in the Ulus District, Bartın Province, Turkey. Its population is 89 (2021).
