= Akseki, Taşköprü =

Village in Turkey

Akseki
- Village
- Location in Turkey
- Coordinates: 41°37′07″N 34°12′22″E
- Country: Turkey
- Province: Kastamonu
- District: Taşköprü
- Population (2021): 71
- Time zone: UTC+3 (TRT)

Akseki is a village in the Taşköprü District of Kastamonu Province in Turkey. Its population is 71 (2021).
