= Ulus District =

District of Bartın Province, Turkey

- District
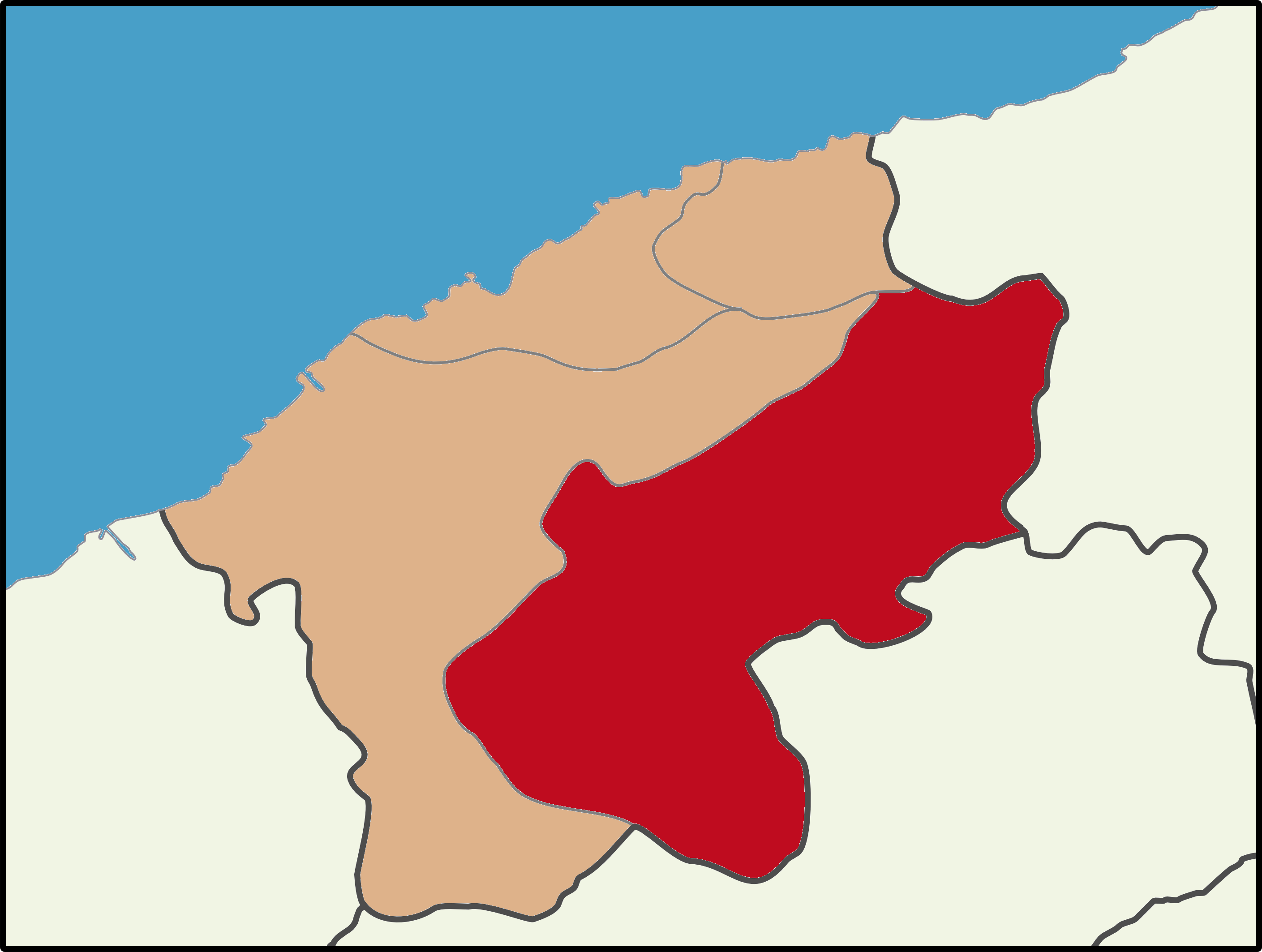
- Map showing Ulus District in Bartın Province

- Location in Turkey
- Coordinates: 41°35′N 32°38′E
- Country: Turkey
- Province: Bartın
- Seat: Ulus

Government
  - Kaymakam: Mehmet Sadık Kılıç
- Area: 909 km^{2} (351 sq mi)
- Population (2021): 21,390
  - Density: 24/km^{2} (61/sq mi)
- Time zone: UTC+3 (TRT)
- Website: www.ulus.gov.tr

Ulus District is a district of the Bartın Province of Turkey. Its seat is the town Ulus. Its area is 909 km^{2}, and its population is 21,390 (2021).

== Composition ==
There are three municipalities in Ulus District:

- Abdipaşa
- Kumluca
- Ulus

There are 68 villages in Ulus District:

- Abdurrahman
- Ağaköy
- Akörensöküler
- Aktaş
- Alıçlı
- Alpı
- Arpacık
- Aşağıçamlı
- Aşağıçerçi
- Aşağıdere
- Aşağıemirce
- Aşağıköy
- Bağdatlı
- Bahçecik
- Balıcak
- Buğurlar
- Çavuşköy
- Çerde
- Ceyüpler
- Çubukbeli
- Çubuklu
- Dereli
- Dibektaş
- Dodurga
- Doğanköy
- Döngeller
- Dörekler
- Dorucaşahinci
- Düzköy
- Eldeş
- Elmacık
- Eseler
- Gökpınar
- Güneyören
- Hasanören
- Hisarköy
- Hocaköy
- İbrahimderesi
- İğneciler
- İnceçam
- Isırganlı
- Kadıköy
- Kalecik
- Karahasan
- Karakışla
- Kayabaşı
- Keçideresi
- Kirazcık
- Kirsinler
- Kıyıklar
- Kızıllar
- Köklü
- Konak
- Konuklu
- Kozanlı
- Küllü
- Öncüler
- Sarıfasıl
- Sarnıç
- Şirinler
- Üçsaray
- Ulukaya
- Uluköy
- Yenikışla
- Yeniköy
- Yılanlar
- Yukarıdere
- Zafer
