= Yoğunoluk, Taşköprü =

Village in Turkey

Yoğunoluk
- Village
- Location in Turkey
- Coordinates: 41.386°N 34.338°E
- Country: Turkey
- Province: Kastamonu
- District: Taşköprü
- Population (2021): 99
- Time zone: UTC+3 (TRT)

Yoğunoluk is a village in the Taşköprü District of Kastamonu Province in Turkey. Its population is 99 (2021).
