= Sarıseki, Taşköprü =

Village in Turkey

Sarıseki
- Village
- Location in Turkey
- Coordinates: 41.721°N 34.251°E
- Country: Turkey
- Province: Kastamonu
- District: Taşköprü
- Population (2021): 94
- Time zone: UTC+3 (TRT)

Sarıseki is a village in the Taşköprü District of Kastamonu Province in Turkey. Its population is 94 (2021).
