= Taşköprü District =

District of Kastamonu Province, Turkey

- District
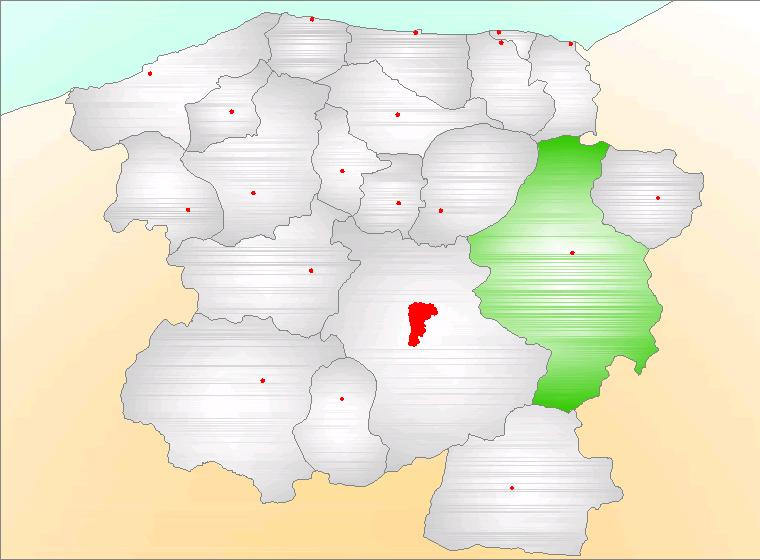
- Map showing Taşköprü District (green) in Kastamonu Province

- Location in Turkey
- Coordinates: 41°31′N 34°13′E
- Country: Turkey
- Province: Kastamonu
- Seat: Taşköprü

Government
  - Kaymakam: Bekir Özen
- Area: 1,758 km^{2} (679 sq mi)
- Population (2021): 37,119
  - Density: 21.11/km^{2} (54.69/sq mi)
- Time zone: UTC+3 (TRT)
- Website: www.taskopru.gov.tr

Taşköprü District is a district of the Kastamonu Province of Turkey. Its seat is the town of Taşköprü. Its area is 1,758 km^{2}, and its population is around 37,000.

== Composition ==
There is one municipality in Taşköprü District:

- Taşköprü

There are 126 villages in Taşköprü District:

- Abay
- Abdalhasan
- Afşar
- Akçakese
- Akdeğirmen
- Akdoğan
- Akdoğantekke
- Akseki
- Alamabatak
- Alamakayış
- Alamaşişli
- Alasökü
- Alatarla
- Alipaşa
- Alisaray
- Armutlu
- Arslanlı
- Aşağıçayırcık
- Aşağıçit
- Aşağıemerce
- Aşağışehirören
- Ayvalı
- Badembekdemir
- Bademci
- Bekdemirekşi
- Bekirli
- Beyköy
- Boyundurcak
- Bozarmut
- Böcü
- Bükköy
- Çambaşı
- Çaycevher
- Çaykirpi
- Çaylaklar
- Çekiç
- Celep
- Çetmi
- Çevik
- Çiftkıran
- Çiftlik
- Çit
- Çördük
- Çoroğlu
- Dağbelören
- Derebeysibey
- Derekaraağaç
- Dereköy
- Dilek
- Donalar
- Doymuş
- Duruca
- Erikköy
- Ersil
- Esenlik
- Eskiatça
- Eskioğlu
- Garipşah
- Gündoğdu
- Güneykalınkese
- Hacıali
- Hamzaoğlu
- Hasanlı
- Hocaköy
- İmamoğlu
- İncesu
- Kabalar
- Kadıköy
- Kapaklı
- Karacakaya
- Karacaoğlu
- Karadedeoğlu
- Karapürçek
- Karnıaçık
- Karşıköy
- Kayadibi
- Kayapınar
- Kaygınca
- Kese
- Kılıçlı
- Kıran
- Kirazcık
- Kırha
- Kızılcaören
- Kızılcaörhen
- Kızılkese
- Koçanlı
- Köçekli
- Kornapa
- Küçüksü
- Kuyluş
- Kuzkalınkese
- Masatlar
- Obrucak
- Olukbaşı
- Ortaköy
- Ortaöz
- Ömerli
- Örhen
- Örhenli
- Oymaağaçseki
- Paşaköy
- Pirahmetli
- Şahinçatı
- Samanlıören
- Sarıkavak
- Sarıseki
- Sarpun
- Şehirören
- Taşçılar
- Tavukçuoğlu
- Tekeoğlu
- Tepedelik
- Tokaş
- Urgancı
- Uzunkavak
- Vakıfbelören
- Yavuç
- Yavuçkuyucağı
- Yazıhamit
- Yeniler
- Yeşilyurt
- Yoğunoluk
- Yukarıçayırcık
- Yukarıemerce
- Yukarışehirören
