= Hasanören, Ulus =

Hasanören
- Village
- Location within Turkey
- Coordinates: 41.6280°N 32.7768°E
- Country: Turkey
- Province: Bartın
- District: Ulus
- Population (2021): 129
- Time zone: UTC+3 (TRT)

Hasanören is a village in the Ulus District, Bartın Province, Turkey. Its population is 129 (2021).
