= Karapınarkavağı, Mudurnu =

Village in Bolu, Turkey

Karapınarkavağı
- Village
- Country: Turkey
- Province: Bolu
- District: Mudurnu
- Population (2021): 73
- Time zone: UTC+3 (TRT)

Karapınarkavağı is a village in the Mudurnu District of Bolu Province in Turkey. Its population is 73 (2021).

== Geography ==
It is located 55 km from Bolu province and 14 km from Mudurnu district.
