= Küllü, Ulus =

Küllü
- Village
- Location within Turkey
- Coordinates: 41.5437°N 32.6318°E
- Country: Turkey
- Province: Bartın
- District: Ulus
- Population (2021): 275
- Time zone: UTC+3 (TRT)

Küllü is a village in the Ulus District, Bartın Province, Turkey. Its population is 275 (2021).
