= Koçanlı, Taşköprü =

Village in Turkey

Koçanlı
- Village
- Location in Turkey
- Coordinates: 41°15′42″N 34°11′06″E
- Country: Turkey
- Province: Kastamonu
- District: Taşköprü
- Population (2021): 110
- Time zone: UTC+3 (TRT)

Koçanlı is a village in the Taşköprü District of Kastamonu Province in Turkey. Its population is 110 (2021).
