= Alamabatak, Taşköprü =

Village in Turkey

Alamabatak
- Village
- Location in Turkey
- Coordinates: 41°27′59″N 34°07′32″E
- Country: Turkey
- Province: Kastamonu
- District: Taşköprü
- Population (2021): 134
- Time zone: UTC+3 (TRT)

Alamabatak is a village in the Taşköprü District of Kastamonu Province in Turkey. Its population is 134 (2021).
