= Eseler, Ulus =

Eseler
- Village
- Location within Turkey
- Coordinates: 41.5667°N 32.6689°E
- Country: Turkey
- Province: Bartın
- District: Ulus
- Population (2021): 222
- Time zone: UTC+3 (TRT)

Eseler is a village in the Ulus District, Bartın Province, Turkey. Its population is 222 (2021).
