= Ekinören, Mudurnu =

Ekinören
- Village
- Location within Turkey
- Coordinates: 40.5435°N 31.0372°E
- Country: Turkey
- Province: Bolu
- District: Mudurnu
- Population (2021): 96
- Time zone: UTC+3 (TRT)

Ekinören is a village in the Mudurnu District, Bolu Province, Turkey. Its population is 96 (2021).
