= Akdoğan, Taşköprü =

Village in Turkey

Akdoğan
- Village
- Location in Turkey
- Coordinates: 41.507°N 34.128°E
- Country: Turkey
- Province: Kastamonu
- District: Taşköprü
- Population (2021): 185
- Time zone: UTC+3 (TRT)

Akdoğan is a village in the Taşköprü District of Kastamonu Province in Turkey. Its population is 185 (2021).
