= Bozarmut, Taşköprü =

Village in Turkey

Bozarmut
- Village
- Location in Turkey
- Coordinates: 41.687°N 34.170°E
- Country: Turkey
- Province: Kastamonu
- District: Taşköprü
- Population (2021): 166
- Time zone: UTC+3 (TRT)

Bozarmut is a village in the Taşköprü District of Kastamonu Province in Turkey. Its population is 166 (2021).
