= Kurtlar, Mudurnu =

Village in Turkey

Kurtlar
- Village
- Country: Turkey
- Province: Bolu
- District: Mudurnu
- Population (2021): 138
- Time zone: UTC+3 (TRT)

Kurtlar is a village in the Mudurnu District of Bolu Province in Turkey. Its population is 138 (2021).
