= Sürmeli, Mudurnu =

Village in Turkey

Sürmeli
- Village
- Country: Turkey
- Province: Bolu
- District: Mudurnu
- Population (2021): 111
- Time zone: UTC+3 (TRT)

Sürmeli is a village in the Mudurnu District of Bolu Province in Turkey. Its population is 111 (2021).
