= Ortaöz, Taşköprü =

Village in Turkey

Ortaöz
- Village
- Location in Turkey
- Coordinates: 41°23′27″N 34°24′33″E
- Country: Turkey
- Province: Kastamonu
- District: Taşköprü
- Population (2021): 40
- Time zone: UTC+3 (TRT)

Ortaöz is a village in the Taşköprü District of Kastamonu Province in Turkey. Its population is 40 (2021).
