= Fındıcak, Mudurnu =

Fındıcak
- Village
- Location within Turkey
- Coordinates: 40.4509°N 31.2358°E
- Country: Turkey
- Province: Bolu
- District: Mudurnu
- Population (2021): 87
- Time zone: UTC+3 (TRT)

Fındıcak is a village in the Mudurnu District, Bolu Province, Turkey. Its population is 87 (2021).
