= Mudurnu District =

District of Bolu Province, Turkey

- District
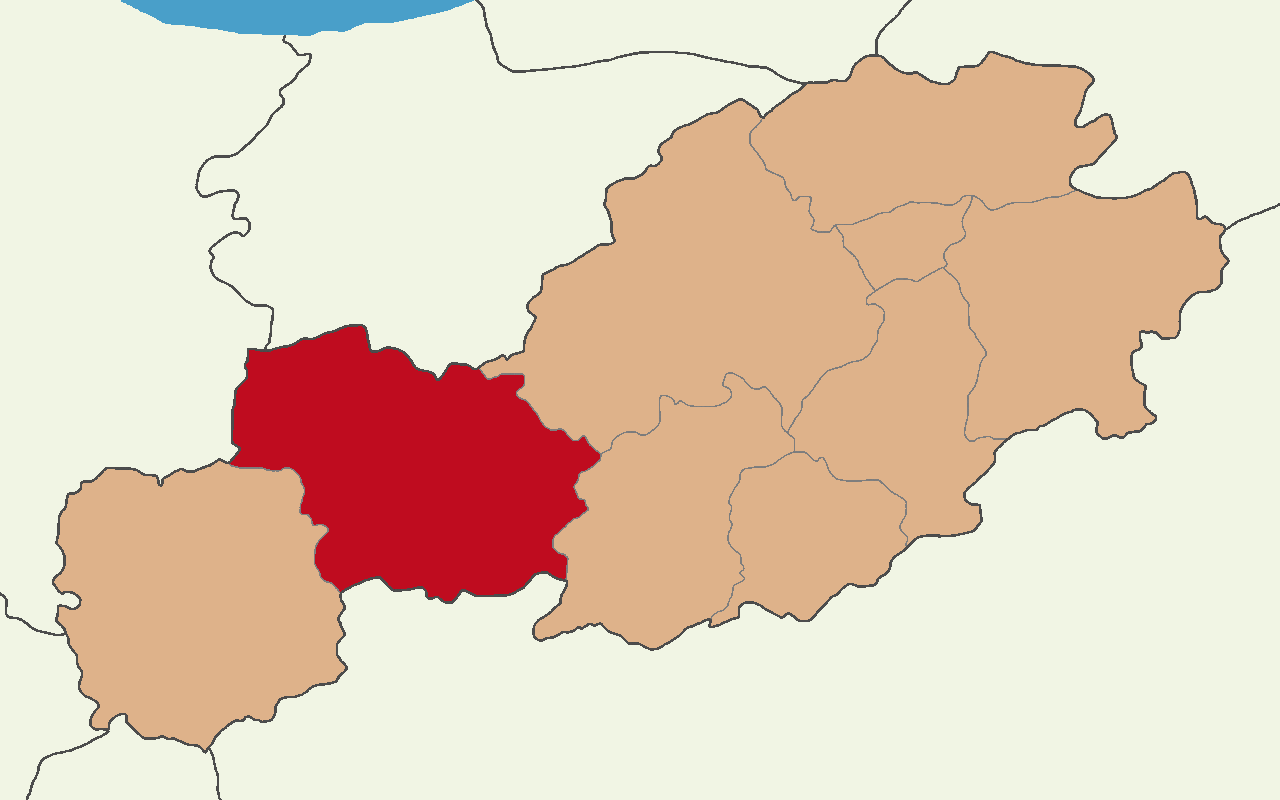
- Map showing Mudurnu District in Bolu Province

- Location in Turkey
- Coordinates: 40°28′N 31°13′E
- Country: Turkey
- Province: Bolu
- Seat: Mudurnu

Government
  - Kaymakam: Fatih Çevik
- Area: 1,314 km^{2} (507 sq mi)
- Population (2021): 18,629
  - Density: 14.18/km^{2} (36.72/sq mi)
- Time zone: UTC+3 (TRT)
- Website: www.mudurnu.gov.tr

Mudurnu District is a district of the Bolu Province of Turkey. Its seat is the town of Mudurnu. Its area is 1,314 km^{2}, and its population is 18,629 (2021).

== Composition ==
There are two municipalities in Mudurnu District:

- Mudurnu
- Taşkesti

There are 70 villages in Mudurnu District:

- Akyokuş
- Alpagut
- Avdullar
- Bekdemirler
- Beyderesi
- Bostancılar
- Bulanık
- Çağşak
- Çamurluk
- Çamyurdu
- Çavuşderesi
- Çepni
- Çevreli
- Cuma
- Dağyolu
- Dedeler
- Delice
- Dereçetinören
- Dereköy
- Dodurga
- Dolayüz
- Ekinören
- Elmacıkdere
- Esenkaya
- Ferüz
- Fındıcak
- Gelinözü
- Gökören
- Gölcük
- Göllüören
- Göncek
- Gürçam
- Güveytepe
- Hacıhalimler
- Hacımusalar
- Hüsamettindere
- İğneciler
- Ilıca
- Kacık
- Karamurat
- Karapınarkavağı
- Karataş
- Karşıköy
- Kavallar
- Keçikıran
- Kilözü
- Kovucak
- Kurtlar
- Mangırlar
- Munduşlar
- Ordular
- Örencik
- Ormanpınarı
- Ortaköy
- Pelitözü
- Samat
- Samsaçavuş
- Sarıyar
- Sarpıncık
- Sırçalı
- Sürmeli
- Taşçılar
- Tavşansuyu
- Tımaraktaş
- Uğurlualan
- Uzunçam
- Vakıfaktaş
- Yaylabeli
- Yazılar
- Yeniceşeyhler
