= Beyderesi, Mudurnu =

Beyderesi
- Village
- Location in Turkey
- Coordinates: 40°30′N 31°24′E
- Country: Turkey
- Province: Bolu
- District: Mudurnu
- Population (2021): 143
- Time zone: UTC+3 (TRT)

Beyderesi is a village in the Mudurnu District, Bolu Province, Turkey. Its population is 143 (2021).
