= Keçideresi, Ulus =

Keçideresi
- Village
- Location within Turkey
- Coordinates: 41°26′N 32°27′E
- Country: Turkey
- Province: Bartın
- District: Ulus
- Population (2021): 175
- Time zone: UTC+3 (TRT)

Keçideresi is a village in the Ulus District, Bartın Province, Turkey. Its population is 175 (2021).
