= Yenikışla, Ulus =

Yenikışla
- Village
- Location within Turkey
- Country: Turkey
- Province: Bartın
- District: Ulus
- Population (2021): 181
- Time zone: UTC+3 (TRT)

Yenikışla is a village in the Ulus District, Bartın Province, Turkey. Its population is 181 (2021).
