= Kovucak, Mudurnu =

Village in Turkey

Kovucak
- Village
- Location in Turkey
- Coordinates: 40°32′N 31°01′E
- Country: Turkey
- Province: Bolu
- District: Mudurnu
- Population (2021): 235
- Time zone: UTC+3 (TRT)

Kovucak is a village in the Mudurnu District of Bolu Province in Turkey. Its population is 235 (2021).
