= Şehirören, Taşköprü =

Village in Turkey

Şehirören
- Village
- Location in Turkey
- Coordinates: 41°20′36″N 34°23′43″E
- Country: Turkey
- Province: Kastamonu
- District: Taşköprü
- Population (2021): 62
- Time zone: UTC+3 (TRT)

Şehirören is a village in the Taşköprü District of Kastamonu Province in Turkey. Its population is 62 (2021).
