= Duruca, Taşköprü =

Village in Turkey

Duruca
- Village
- Location in Turkey
- Coordinates: 41°36′01″N 34°11′28″E
- Country: Turkey
- Province: Kastamonu
- District: Taşköprü
- Population (2021): 168
- Time zone: UTC+3 (TRT)

Duruca is a village in the Taşköprü District of Kastamonu Province in Turkey. Its population is 168 (2021).
