= Balıcak, Ulus =

Balıcak
- Village
- Location within Turkey
- Coordinates: 41°33′N 32°35′E
- Country: Turkey
- Province: Bartın
- District: Ulus
- Population (2021): 214
- Time zone: UTC+3 (TRT)

Balıcak is a village in the Ulus District, Bartın Province, Turkey. Its population is 214 (2021).
