= Alamakayış, Taşköprü =

Village in Turkey

Alamakayış
- Village
- Location in Turkey
- Coordinates: 41°28′34″N 34°08′17″E
- Country: Turkey
- Province: Kastamonu
- District: Taşköprü
- Population (2021): 111
- Time zone: UTC+3 (TRT)

Alamakayış is a village in the Taşköprü District of Kastamonu Province in Turkey. Its population is 111 (2021).
