= Yeniköy, Ulus =

Yeniköy
- Village
- Location within Turkey
- Coordinates: 41°35′56″N 32°46′51″E
- Country: Turkey
- Province: Bartın
- District: Ulus
- Population (2021): 121
- Time zone: UTC+3 (TRT)

Yeniköy is a village in the Ulus District, Bartın Province, Turkey. Its population is 121 (2021).
