= Zafer, Ulus =

Zafer
- Village
- Location within Turkey
- Coordinates: 41.4378°N 32.5616°E
- Country: Turkey
- Province: Bartın
- District: Ulus
- Population (2021): 604
- Time zone: UTC+3 (TRT)

Zafer is a village in the Ulus District, Bartın Province, Turkey. Its population is 604 (2021).
