= Uluköy, Ulus =

Uluköy
- Village
- Location within Turkey
- Coordinates: 41.4072°N 32.5226°E
- Country: Turkey
- Province: Bartın
- District: Ulus
- Population (2021): 363
- Time zone: UTC+3 (TRT)

Uluköy is a village in the Ulus District, Bartın Province, Turkey. Its population is 363 (2021).
