= Karakışla, Ulus =

Karakışla
- Village
- Location within Turkey
- Coordinates: 41.5157°N 32.6765°E
- Country: Turkey
- Province: Bartın
- District: Ulus
- Population (2021): 90
- Time zone: UTC+3 (TRT)

Karakışla is a village in the Ulus District, Bartın Province, Turkey. Its population is 90 (2021).
