= Alisaray, Taşköprü =

Village in Turkey

Alisaray
- Village
- Location in Turkey
- Coordinates: 41°26′35″N 34°16′07″E
- Country: Turkey
- Province: Kastamonu
- District: Taşköprü
- Population (2021): 113
- Time zone: UTC+3 (TRT)

Alisaray is a village in the Taşköprü District of Kastamonu Province in Turkey. Its population is 113 (2021).
