= İncesu, Taşköprü =

Village in Turkey

İncesu
- Village
- Location in Turkey
- Coordinates: 41.595°N 34.248°E
- Country: Turkey
- Province: Kastamonu
- District: Taşköprü
- Population (2021): 254
- Time zone: UTC+3 (TRT)

İncesu is a village in the Taşköprü District of Kastamonu Province in Turkey. Its population is 254 (2021).
