= Akörensöküler, Ulus =

Akörensöküler
- Village
- Location within Turkey
- Coordinates: 41°27′N 32°32′E
- Country: Turkey
- Province: Bartın
- District: Ulus
- Population (2021): 307
- Time zone: UTC+3 (TRT)

Akörensöküler is a village in the Ulus District, Bartın Province, Turkey. Its population is 307 (2021).
