= Kilözü, Mudurnu =

Village in Turkey

Kilözü
- Village
- Location in Turkey
- Coordinates: 40°32′N 31°11′E
- Country: Turkey
- Province: Bolu
- District: Mudurnu
- Population (2021): 163
- Time zone: UTC+3 (TRT)

Kilözü is a village in the Mudurnu District of Bolu Province in Turkey. Its population is 163 (2021).
