= Arslanlı, Taşköprü =

Village in Turkey

Arslanlı
- Village
- Location in Turkey
- Coordinates: 41.324°N 34.170°E
- Country: Turkey
- Province: Kastamonu
- District: Taşköprü
- Population (2021): 111
- Time zone: UTC+3 (TRT)

Arslanlı is a village in the Taşköprü District of Kastamonu Province in Turkey. Its population is 111 (2021).
