= Ferüz, Mudurnu =

Ferüz
- Village
- Location within Turkey
- Coordinates: 40.5796°N 31.3528°E
- Country: Turkey
- Province: Bolu
- District: Mudurnu
- Population (2021): 194
- Time zone: UTC+3 (TRT)

Ferüz is a village in the Mudurnu District, Bolu Province, Turkey. Its population is 194 (2021).
