= Dörekler, Ulus =

Dörekler
- Village
- Location in Turkey
- Coordinates: 41°37′N 32°42′E
- Country: Turkey
- Province: Bartın
- District: Ulus
- Population (2021): 128
- Time zone: UTC+3 (TRT)

Dörekler is a village in the Ulus District, Bartın Province, Turkey. Its population is 128 (2021).
