= Kirsinler, Ulus =

Kirsinler
- Village
- Location in Turkey
- Coordinates: 41°28′N 32°26′E
- Country: Turkey
- Province: Bartın
- District: Ulus
- Population (2021): 426
- Time zone: UTC+3 (TRT)

Kirsinler is a village in the Ulus District, Bartın Province, Turkey. Its population was 426 in 2021.
