= Örhenli, Taşköprü =

Village in Turkey

Örhenli
- Village
- Location within Turkey
- Coordinates: 41°27′53″N 34°10′28″E
- Country: Turkey
- Province: Kastamonu
- District: Taşköprü
- Population (2021): 91
- Time zone: UTC+3 (TRT)

Örhenli is a village in the Taşköprü District of Kastamonu Province in Turkey. Its population is 91 (2021).
