= Vakıfaktaş, Mudurnu =

Village in Turkey

Vakıfaktaş
- Village
- Location in Turkey
- Coordinates: 40°24′N 31°15′E
- Country: Turkey
- Province: Bolu
- District: Mudurnu
- Population (2021): 59
- Time zone: UTC+3 (TRT)

Vakıfaktaş is a village in the Mudurnu District of Bolu Province in Turkey. Its population is 59 (2021).
