= Yazıhamit, Taşköprü =

Village in Turkey

Yazıhamit
- Village
- Location within Turkey
- Coordinates: 41°29′12″N 34°10′20″E
- Country: Turkey
- Province: Kastamonu
- District: Taşköprü
- Population (2021): 197
- Time zone: UTC+3 (TRT)

Yazıhamit is a village in the Taşköprü District of Kastamonu Province in Turkey. Its population is 197 (2021).
