= Ormanpınarı, Mudurnu =

Village in Turkey

Ormanpınarı
- Village
- Country: Turkey
- Province: Bolu
- District: Mudurnu
- Population (2021): 120
- Time zone: UTC+3 (TRT)

Ormanpınarı is a village in the Mudurnu District of Bolu Province in Turkey. Its population is 120 (2021).
