= Ortaköy, Mudurnu =

Village in Turkey

Ortaköy
- Village
- Country: Turkey
- Province: Bolu
- District: Mudurnu
- Population (2021): 228
- Time zone: UTC+3 (TRT)

Ortaköy is a village in the Mudurnu District of Bolu Province in Turkey. Its population is 228 (2021).
