= Dereçetinören, Mudurnu =

Dereçetinören
- Village
- Location within Turkey
- Coordinates: 40.4592°N 31.3289°E
- Country: Turkey
- Province: Bolu
- District: Mudurnu
- Population (2021): 131
- Time zone: UTC+3 (TRT)

Dereçetinören is a village in the Mudurnu District, Bolu Province, Turkey. Its population is 131 (2021).
