= Kornapa, Taşköprü =

Village in Turkey

Kornapa
- Village
- Location in Turkey
- Coordinates: 41°34′35″N 34°16′23″E
- Country: Turkey
- Province: Kastamonu
- District: Taşköprü
- Population (2021): 246
- Time zone: UTC+3 (TRT)

Kornapa is a village in the Taşköprü District of Kastamonu Province in Turkey. Its population is 246 (2021).
