= Düzköy, Ulus =

Düzköy
- Village
- Location within Turkey
- Coordinates: 41°38′43″N 32°46′12″E
- Country: Turkey
- Province: Bartın
- District: Ulus
- Population (2021): 116
- Time zone: UTC+3 (TRT)

Düzköy is a village in the Ulus District, Bartın Province, Turkey. Its population is 116 (2021).
