= Aşağıçerçi, Ulus =

Aşağıçerçi
- Village
- Location within Turkey
- Coordinates: 41°36′N 32°37′E
- Country: Turkey
- Province: Bartın
- District: Ulus
- Population (2021): 224
- Time zone: UTC+3 (TRT)

Aşağıçerçi is a village in the Ulus District, Bartın Province, Turkey. Its population is 224 (2021).
