= Dedeler, Mudurnu =

Dedeler
- Village
- Location within Turkey
- Country: Turkey
- Province: Bolu
- District: Mudurnu
- Population (2021): 108
- Time zone: UTC+3 (TRT)

Dedeler is a village in the Mudurnu District, Bolu Province, Turkey. Its population is 108 (2021).
