= Celep, Taşköprü =

Village in Turkey

Celep
- Village
- Location in Turkey
- Coordinates: 41.404°N 34.015°E
- Country: Turkey
- Province: Kastamonu
- District: Taşköprü
- Population (2021): 160
- Time zone: UTC+3 (TRT)

Celep is a village in the Taşköprü District of Kastamonu Province in Turkey. Its population is 160 (2021).
