= Bağdatlı, Ulus =

Bağdatlı
- Village
- Location within Turkey
- Coordinates: 41.4080°N 32.4745°E
- Country: Turkey
- Province: Bartın
- District: Ulus
- Population (2021): 122
- Time zone: UTC+3 (TRT)

Bağdatlı is a village in the Ulus District, Bartın Province, Turkey. Its population is 122 (2021).
