= Paşaköy, Taşköprü =

Village in Turkey

Paşaköy
- Village
- Location in Turkey
- Coordinates: 41.465°N 34.407°E
- Country: Turkey
- Province: Kastamonu
- District: Taşköprü
- Population (2021): 207
- Time zone: UTC+3 (TRT)

Paşaköy is a village in the Taşköprü District of Kastamonu Province in Turkey. Its population is 207 (2021).
