= Abdalhasan, Taşköprü =

Village in Turkey

Abdalhasan
- Village
- Location in Turkey
- Coordinates: 41°23′49″N 34°15′05″E
- Country: Turkey
- Province: Kastamonu
- District: Taşköprü
- Population (2021): 67
- Time zone: UTC+3 (TRT)

Abdalhasan is a village in the Taşköprü District of Kastamonu Province in Turkey. Its population is 67 (2021).
