= Kıran, Taşköprü =

Village in Turkey

Kıran
- Village
- Location in Turkey
- Coordinates: 41.473°N 34.077°E
- Country: Turkey
- Province: Kastamonu
- District: Taşköprü
- Population (2021): 180
- Time zone: UTC+3 (TRT)

Kıran is a village in the Taşköprü District of Kastamonu Province in Turkey. Its population is 180 (2021).
