= Karataş, Mudurnu =

Village in Turkey

Karataş
- Village
- Location in Turkey
- Coordinates: 40°30′12″N 31°14′00″E
- Country: Turkey
- Province: Bolu
- District: Mudurnu
- Population (2021): 183
- Time zone: UTC+3 (TRT)

Karataş is a village in the Mudurnu District of Bolu Province in Turkey. Its population is 183 (2021).
