= Gürçam, Mudurnu =

Gürçam
- Village
- Location within Turkey
- Coordinates: 40.4539°N 31.2955°E
- Country: Turkey
- Province: Bolu
- District: Mudurnu
- Population (2021): 119
- Time zone: UTC+3 (TRT)

Gürçam is a village in the Mudurnu District, Bolu Province, Turkey. Its population is 119 (2021).
