= Uzunkavak, Taşköprü =

Village in Turkey

Uzunkavak
- Village
- Location in Turkey
- Coordinates: 41.487°N 33.995°E
- Country: Turkey
- Province: Kastamonu
- District: Taşköprü
- Population (2021): 397
- Time zone: UTC+3 (TRT)

Uzunkavak is a village in the Taşköprü District of Kastamonu Province in Turkey. Its population is 397 (2021).
