= Kadıköy, Ulus =

Kadıköy
- Village
- Location within Turkey
- Coordinates: 41.658°N 32.731°E
- Country: Turkey
- Province: Bartın
- District: Ulus
- Population (2021): 201
- Time zone: UTC+3 (TRT)

Kadıköy is a village in the Ulus District, Bartın Province, Turkey. Its population is 201 (2021).
