= Kızılcaören, Taşköprü =

Village in Turkey

Kızılcaören
- Village
- Location in Turkey
- Coordinates: 41.418°N 34.125°E
- Country: Turkey
- Province: Kastamonu
- District: Taşköprü
- Population (2021): 170
- Time zone: UTC+3 (TRT)

Kızılcaören is a village in the Taşköprü District of Kastamonu Province in Turkey. Its population is 170 (2021).
