= Ordular, Mudurnu =

Village in Turkey

Ordular
- Village
- Location in Turkey
- Coordinates: 40°22′19″N 31°20′52″E
- Country: Turkey
- Province: Bolu
- District: Mudurnu
- Population (2021): 60
- Time zone: UTC+3 (TRT)

Ordular is a village in the Mudurnu District of Bolu Province in Turkey. Its population is 60 (2021).
