= Kılıçlı, Taşköprü =

Village in Turkey

Kılıçlı
- Village
- Location in Turkey
- Coordinates: 41.415°N 34.389°E
- Country: Turkey
- Province: Kastamonu
- District: Taşköprü
- Population (2021): 91
- Time zone: UTC+3 (TRT)

Kılıçlı is a village in the Taşköprü District of Kastamonu Province in Turkey. Its population is 91 (2021).
