= Çağşak, Mudurnu =

Çağşak
- Village
- Location within Turkey
- Coordinates: 40.5276°N 30.9712°E
- Country: Turkey
- Province: Bolu
- District: Mudurnu
- Population (2021): 118
- Time zone: UTC+3 (TRT)

Çağşak is a village in the Mudurnu District, Bolu Province, Turkey. Its population is 118 (2021).
