= İnceçam, Ulus =

İnceçam
- Village
- Location within Turkey
- Coordinates: 41°32′N 32°33′E
- Country: Turkey
- Province: Bartın
- District: Ulus
- Population (2021): 239
- Time zone: UTC+3 (TRT)

İnceçam is a village in the Ulus District, Bartın Province, Turkey. Its population is 239 (2021).
