= Abdurrahman, Ulus =

Abdurrahman
- Village
- Location within Turkey
- Coordinates: 41.6401°N 32.6653°E
- Country: Turkey
- Province: Bartın
- District: Ulus
- Population (2021): 149
- Time zone: UTC+3 (TRT)

Abdurrahman is a village in the Ulus District, Bartın Province, Turkey. Its population is 149 (2021).
