= Alıçlı, Ulus =

Alıçlı
- Village
- Location within Turkey
- Coordinates: 41.6812°N 32.7861°E
- Country: Turkey
- Province: Bartın
- District: Ulus
- Population (2021): 111
- Time zone: UTC+3 (TRT)

Alıçlı is a village in the Ulus District, Bartın Province, Turkey. Its population is 111 (2021).
