= Hisarköy, Ulus =

Hisarköy
- Village
- Location within Turkey
- Coordinates: 41.4509°N 32.5472°E
- Country: Turkey
- Province: Bartın
- District: Ulus
- Population (2021): 387
- Time zone: UTC+3 (TRT)

Hisarköy is a village in the Ulus District, Bartın Province, Turkey. Its population is 387 (2021).
