= Taşkesti =

- Municipality
- Location within Turkey
- Coordinates: 40°34′N 31°00′E
- Country: Turkey
- Province: Bolu
- District: Mudurnu
- Elevation: 560 m (1,840 ft)
- Population (2021): 2,339
- Time zone: UTC+3 (TRT)
- Postal code: 14810
- Area code: 0374
- Climate: Cfb

Taşkesti is a town (belde) in the Mudurnu District, Bolu Province, Turkey. Its population is 2,339 (2021). It is situated in dense forestry. It is on a tributary of Sakarya River and Turkish state highway D.140 from west to Mudurnu. The distance to Mudurnu is 35 kilometres (22 mi) and to Bolu is 85 kilometres (53 mi). The area around Taşkesti was populated during Phrygian Kingdom of the antiquity. But Taşkesti was founded in 1957 after an earthquake. In 1989, the settlement was declared a seat of township. In addition to agriculture, forestry and forest product industry are the main economic activities of the town.
