= Çevik, Taşköprü =

Village in Turkey

Çevik
- Village
- Location in Turkey
- Coordinates: 41°28′48″N 34°13′31″E
- Country: Turkey
- Province: Kastamonu
- District: Taşköprü
- Population (2021): 78
- Time zone: UTC+3 (TRT)

Çevik is a village in the Taşköprü District of Kastamonu Province in Turkey. Its population is 78 (2021).
