= Esenkaya, Mudurnu =

Esenkaya
- Village
- Location within Turkey
- Coordinates: 40.5234°N 31.1755°E
- Country: Turkey
- Province: Bolu
- District: Mudurnu
- Population (2021): 191
- Time zone: UTC+3 (TRT)

Esenkaya is a village in the Mudurnu District, Bolu Province, Turkey. Its population is 191 (2021).
