= Ceyüpler, Ulus =

Ceyüpler
- Village
- Location within Turkey
- Coordinates: 41°28′N 32°32′E
- Country: Turkey
- Province: Bartın
- District: Ulus
- Population (2021): 161
- Time zone: UTC+3 (TRT)

Ceyüpler is a village in the Ulus District, Bartın Province, Turkey. Its population was 161 as of 2021.
