= Çevreli, Mudurnu =

Çevreli
- Village
- Location within Turkey
- Coordinates: 40.5369°N 31.0672°E
- Country: Turkey
- Province: Bolu
- District: Mudurnu
- Population (2021): 81
- Time zone: UTC+3 (TRT)

Çevreli is a village in the Mudurnu District, Bolu Province, Turkey. Its population is 81 (2021).
