= Çubukbeli, Ulus =

Çubukbeli
- Village
- Location within Turkey
- Coordinates: 41°41′N 32°51′E
- Country: Turkey
- Province: Bartın
- District: Ulus
- Population (2021): 88
- Time zone: UTC+3 (TRT)

Çubukbeli is a village in the Ulus District, Bartın Province, Turkey. Its population is 88 (2021).
