= Bulanık, Mudurnu =

Bulanık
- Village
- Location within Turkey
- Coordinates: 40.5570°N 31.3148°E
- Country: Turkey
- Province: Bolu
- District: Mudurnu
- Population (2021): 267
- Time zone: UTC+3 (TRT)

Bulanık is a village in the Mudurnu District, Bolu Province, Turkey. Its population is 267 (2021).
