= Sarıyar, Mudurnu =

Village in Turkey

Sarıyar
- Village
- Country: Turkey
- Province: Bolu
- District: Mudurnu
- Population (2021): 143
- Time zone: UTC+3 (TRT)

Sarıyar is a village in the Mudurnu District of Bolu Province in Turkey. Its population is 143 (2021).
