= Kalecik, Ulus =

Kalecik
- Village
- Location within Turkey
- Coordinates: 41.4455°N 32.6290°E
- Country: Turkey
- Province: Bartın
- District: Ulus
- Population (2021): 103
- Time zone: UTC+3 (TRT)

Kalecik is a village in the Ulus District, Bartın Province, Turkey. Its population is 103 (2021).
