= Bekdemirler, Mudurnu =

Bekdemirler
- Village
- Location within Turkey
- Coordinates: 40.6005°N 30.9754°E
- Country: Turkey
- Province: Bolu
- District: Mudurnu
- Population (2021): 303
- Time zone: UTC+3 (TRT)

Bekdemirler is a village in the Mudurnu District, Bolu Province, Turkey. Its population is 303 (2021).
