= Çubuklu, Ulus =

Çubuklu
- Village
- Location within Turkey
- Coordinates: 41.4741°N 32.4984°E
- Country: Turkey
- Province: Bartın
- District: Ulus
- Population (2021): 337
- Time zone: UTC+3 (TRT)

Çubuklu is a village in the Ulus District, Bartın Province, Turkey. Its population is 337 (2021).
