= Tımaraktaş, Mudurnu =

Village in Turkey

Tımaraktaş
- Village
- Location in Turkey
- Coordinates: 40°24′N 31°14′E
- Country: Turkey
- Province: Bolu
- District: Mudurnu
- Population (2021): 78
- Time zone: UTC+3 (TRT)

Tımaraktaş is a village in the Mudurnu District of Bolu Province in Turkey. Its population is 78 (2021).
