= Alpı, Ulus =

Alpı
- Village
- Location within Turkey
- Coordinates: 41.6080°N 32.6071°E
- Country: Turkey
- Province: Bartın
- District: Ulus
- Population (2021): 78
- Time zone: UTC+3 (TRT)

Alpı is a village in the Ulus District, Bartın Province, Turkey. Its population is 78 (2021).
