= Çiftlik, Taşköprü =

Village in Turkey

Çiftlik
- Village
- Location in Turkey
- Coordinates: 41.258°N 34.228°E
- Country: Turkey
- Province: Kastamonu
- District: Taşköprü
- Population (2021): 139
- Time zone: UTC+3 (TRT)

Çiftlik (also: Çiftlikköy) is a village in the Taşköprü District of Kastamonu Province in Turkey. Its population is 139 (2021).
