= Dilek, Taşköprü =

Village in Turkey

Dilek
- Village
- Location in Turkey
- Coordinates: 41.205°N 34.216°E
- Country: Turkey
- Province: Kastamonu
- District: Taşköprü
- Population (2021): 50
- Time zone: UTC+3 (TRT)

Dilek is a village in the Taşköprü District of Kastamonu Province in Turkey. Its population is 50 (2021).
