= Kıyıklar, Ulus =

Kıyıklar
- Village
- Location within Turkey
- Coordinates: 41°28′N 32°31′E
- Country: Turkey
- Province: Bartın
- District: Ulus
- Population (2021): 132
- Time zone: UTC+3 (TRT)

Kıyıklar is a village in the Ulus District, Bartın Province, Turkey. Its population is 132 (2021).
