= Güneykalınkese, Taşköprü =

Village in Turkey

Güneykalınkese
- Village
- Location in Turkey
- Coordinates: 41°12′58″N 34°09′17″E
- Country: Turkey
- Province: Kastamonu
- District: Taşköprü
- Population (2021): 124
- Time zone: UTC+3 (TRT)

Güneykalınkese is a village in the Taşköprü District of Kastamonu Province in Turkey. Its population is 124 (2021).
