= Tavşansuyu, Mudurnu =

Village in Turkey

Tavşansuyu
- Village
- Location in Turkey
- Coordinates: 40°34′25″N 30°53′33″E
- Country: Turkey
- Province: Bolu
- District: Mudurnu
- Population (2021): 228
- Time zone: UTC+3 (TRT)

Tavşansuyu is a village in the Mudurnu District of Bolu Province in Turkey. Its population is 228 (2021).
