= Buğurlar, Ulus =

Buğurlar
- Village
- Location within Turkey
- Coordinates: 41°30′N 32°38′E
- Country: Turkey
- Province: Bartın
- District: Ulus
- Population (2021): 197
- Time zone: UTC+3 (TRT)

Buğurlar is a village in the Ulus District, Bartın Province, Turkey. Its population is 197 (2021).
