= Masatlar, Taşköprü =

Village in Turkey

Masatlar
- Village
- Location in Turkey
- Coordinates: 41°32′07″N 34°06′57″E
- Country: Turkey
- Province: Kastamonu
- District: Taşköprü
- Population (2021): 206
- Time zone: UTC+3 (TRT)

Masatlar is a village in the Taşköprü District of Kastamonu Province in Turkey. Its population is 206 (2021).
