= Olukbaşı, Taşköprü =

Village in Turkey

Olukbaşı
- Village
- Location in Turkey
- Coordinates: 41.474°N 34.256°E
- Country: Turkey
- Province: Kastamonu
- District: Taşköprü
- Population (2021): 186
- Time zone: UTC+3 (TRT)

Olukbaşı is a village in the Taşköprü District of Kastamonu Province in Turkey. Its population is 186 (2021).
