= Yazılar, Mudurnu =

Village in Turkey

Yazılar
- Village
- Location in Turkey
- Coordinates: 40°32′20″N 31°20′0″E
- Country: Turkey
- Province: Bolu
- District: Mudurnu
- Population (2021): 298
- Time zone: UTC+3 (TRT)

Yazılar is a village in the Mudurnu District of Bolu Province in Turkey. Its population is 298 (2021).
