= Karnıaçık, Taşköprü =

Village in Turkey

Karnıaçık
- Village
- Location in Turkey
- Coordinates: 41°26′45″N 34°03′47″E
- Country: Turkey
- Province: Kastamonu
- District: Taşköprü
- Population (2021): 141
- Time zone: UTC+3 (TRT)

Karnıaçık is a village in the Taşköprü District of Kastamonu Province in Turkey. Its population is 141 (2021).
