= Akçakese, Taşköprü =

Village in Turkey

Akçakese
- Village
- Location in Turkey
- Coordinates: 41.669°N 34.281°E
- Country: Turkey
- Province: Kastamonu
- District: Taşköprü
- Population (2021): 210
- Time zone: UTC+3 (TRT)

Akçakese is a village in the Taşköprü District of Kastamonu Province in Turkey. Its population is 210 (2021).
