= Çamyurdu, Mudurnu =

Çamyurdu
- Village
- Location within Turkey
- Coordinates: 40.5833°N 30.9075°E
- Country: Turkey
- Province: Bolu
- District: Mudurnu
- Population (2021): 205
- Time zone: UTC+3 (TRT)

Çamyurdu is a village in the Mudurnu District, Bolu Province, Turkey. Its population is 205 (2021).
