= Gelinözü, Mudurnu =

Gelinözü
- Village
- Location within Turkey
- Coordinates: 40°27′N 31°06′E
- Country: Turkey
- Province: Bolu
- District: Mudurnu
- Population (2021): 86
- Time zone: UTC+3 (TRT)

Gelinözü is a village in the Mudurnu District, Bolu Province, Turkey. Its population is 86 (2021).
