= Kaygınca, Taşköprü =

Village in Turkey

Kaygınca
- Village
- Location in Turkey
- Coordinates: 41°33′13″N 34°00′53″E
- Country: Turkey
- Province: Kastamonu
- District: Taşköprü
- Population (2021): 205
- Time zone: UTC+3 (TRT)

Kaygınca is a village in the Taşköprü District of Kastamonu Province in Turkey. Its population is 205 (2021).
