= Abay, Taşköprü =

Village in Turkey

Abay
- Village
- Location in Turkey
- Coordinates: 41°26′17″N 33°59′14″E
- Country: Turkey
- Province: Kastamonu
- District: Taşköprü
- Population (2021): 173
- Time zone: UTC+3 (TRT)

Abay is a village in the Taşköprü District of Kastamonu Province in Turkey. Its population is 173 (2021).
