= Alasökü, Taşköprü =

Village in Turkey

Alasökü
- Village
- Location in Turkey
- Coordinates: 41°20′19″N 34°25′09″E
- Country: Turkey
- Province: Kastamonu
- District: Taşköprü
- Population (2021): 40
- Time zone: UTC+3 (TRT)

Alasökü is a village in the Taşköprü District of Kastamonu Province in Turkey. Its population is 40 (2021).
