= Munduşlar, Mudurnu =

Village in Turkey

Munduşlar
- Village
- Location in Turkey
- Coordinates: 40°29′55″N 31°09′24″E
- Country: Turkey
- Province: Bolu
- District: Mudurnu
- Population (2021): 223
- Time zone: UTC+3 (TRT)

Munduşlar is a village in the Mudurnu District of Bolu Province in Turkey. Its population is 223 (2021).
