= Gökören, Mudurnu =

Gökören
- Village
- Location within Turkey
- Country: Turkey
- Province: Bolu
- District: Mudurnu
- Population (2021): 145
- Time zone: UTC+3 (TRT)

Gökören is a village in the Mudurnu District, Bolu Province, Turkey. Its population is 145 (2021).
