= Eldeş, Ulus =

Eldeş
- Village
- Location within Turkey
- Coordinates: 41.5694°N 32.6806°E
- Country: Turkey
- Province: Bartın
- District: Ulus
- Population (2021): 332
- Time zone: UTC+3 (TRT)

Eldeş is a village in the Ulus District, Bartın Province, Turkey. Its population is 332 (2021).
