= Örhen, Taşköprü =

Village in Turkey

Örhen
- Village
- Location in Turkey
- Coordinates: 41°32′35″N 33°56′52″E
- Country: Turkey
- Province: Kastamonu
- District: Taşköprü
- Population (2021): 127
- Time zone: UTC+3 (TRT)

Örhen is a village in the Taşköprü District of Kastamonu Province in Turkey. Its population is 127 (2021).
