= Dodurga, Mudurnu =

Dodurga
- Village
- Location within Turkey
- Coordinates: 40.3762°N 31.4264°E
- Country: Turkey
- Province: Bolu
- District: Mudurnu
- Population (2021): 97
- Time zone: UTC+3 (TRT)

Dodurga is a village in the Mudurnu District, Bolu Province, Turkey. Its population is 97 (2021).
