= Isırganlı, Ulus =

Isırganlı
- Village
- Location within Turkey
- Coordinates: 41.6241°N 32.8313°E
- Country: Turkey
- Province: Bartın
- District: Ulus
- Population (2021): 81
- Time zone: UTC+3 (TRT)

Isırganlı is a village in the Ulus District, Bartın Province, Turkey. Its population is 81 (2021).
