= Yukarışehirören, Taşköprü =

Village in Turkey

Yukarışehirören
- Village
- Location in Turkey
- Coordinates: 41°21′46″N 34°24′28″E
- Country: Turkey
- Province: Kastamonu
- District: Taşköprü
- Population (2021): 45
- Time zone: UTC+3 (TRT)

Yukarışehirören is a village in the Taşköprü District of Kastamonu Province in Turkey. Its population is 45 (2021).
