= Karahasan, Ulus =

Karahasan
- Village
- Location within Turkey
- Coordinates: 41.6052°N 32.6002°E
- Country: Turkey
- Province: Bartın
- District: Ulus
- Population (2021): 144
- Time zone: UTC+3 (TRT)

Karahasan is a village in the Ulus District, Bartın Province, Turkey. Its population is 144 (2021).
