= Gölcük, Mudurnu =

Gölcük
- Village
- Location within Turkey
- Coordinates: 40.5794°N 31.1465°E
- Country: Turkey
- Province: Bolu
- District: Mudurnu
- Population (2021): 159
- Time zone: UTC+3 (TRT)

Gölcük is a village in the Mudurnu District, Bolu Province, Turkey. Its population is 159 (2021).
