= Çördük, Taşköprü =

Village in Turkey

Çördük
- Village
- Location in Turkey
- Coordinates: 41.550°N 34.243°E
- Country: Turkey
- Province: Kastamonu
- District: Taşköprü
- Population (2021): 261
- Time zone: UTC+3 (TRT)

Çördük is a village in the Taşköprü District of Kastamonu Province in Turkey. Its population is 261 (2021).
