= Karamurat, Mudurnu =

Village in Turkey

Karamurat
- Village
- Country: Turkey
- Province: Bolu
- District: Mudurnu
- Population (2021): 365
- Time zone: UTC+3 (TRT)

Karamurat is a village in the Mudurnu District of Bolu Province in Turkey. Its population is 365 (2021).
