= Yeniceşeyhler, Mudurnu =

Village in Bolu, Turkey

Yeniceşeyhler
- Village
- Location in Turkey
- Coordinates: 40°30′N 31°07′E
- Country: Turkey
- Province: Bolu
- District: Mudurnu
- Population (2021): 172
- Time zone: UTC+3 (TRT)

Yeniceşeyhler is a village in the Mudurnu District of Bolu Province in Turkey. Its population is 172 (2021).
