= Çerde, Ulus =

Çerde
- Village
- Location within Turkey
- Coordinates: 41°36′N 32°34′E
- Country: Turkey
- Province: Bartın
- District: Ulus
- Population (2021): 182
- Time zone: UTC+3 (TRT)

Çerde is a village in the Ulus District, Bartın Province, Turkey. Its population is 182 (2021).
