= Badembekdemir, Taşköprü =

Village in Turkey

Badembekdemir
- Village
- Location in Turkey
- Coordinates: 41°31′43″N 34°19′01″E
- Country: Turkey
- Province: Kastamonu
- District: Taşköprü
- Population (2021): 138
- Time zone: UTC+3 (TRT)

Badembekdemir is a village in the Taşköprü District of Kastamonu Province in Turkey. Its population is 138 (2021).
