= Hacıali, Taşköprü =

Village in Turkey

Hacıali
- Village
- Location in Turkey
- Coordinates: 41.478°N 34.401°E
- Country: Turkey
- Province: Kastamonu
- District: Taşköprü
- Population (2021): 46
- Time zone: UTC+3 (TRT)

Hacıali is a village in the Taşköprü District of Kastamonu Province in Turkey. Its population is 46 (2021).
