= Dolayüz, Mudurnu =

Dolayüz
- Village
- Location within Turkey
- Coordinates: 40°26′N 31°10′E
- Country: Turkey
- Province: Bolu
- District: Mudurnu
- Population (2021): 182
- Time zone: UTC+3 (TRT)

Dolayüz is a village in the Mudurnu District, Bolu Province, Turkey. Its population is 182 (2021).
