= Göllüören, Mudurnu =

Göllüören
- Village
- Location within Turkey
- Coordinates: 40°29′N 31°19′E
- Country: Turkey
- Province: Bolu
- District: Mudurnu
- Population (2021): 93
- Time zone: UTC+3 (TRT)

Göllüören is a village in the Mudurnu District, Bolu Province, Turkey. Its population is 93 (2021).
