= Örencik, Mudurnu =

Village in Turkey

Örencik
- Village
- Location in Turkey
- Coordinates: 40°34′31″N 31°16′44″E
- Country: Turkey
- Province: Bolu
- District: Mudurnu
- Population (2021): 276
- Time zone: UTC+3 (TRT)

Örencik is a village in the Mudurnu District of Bolu Province in Turkey. Its population is 276 (2021).
