= Ersil, Taşköprü =

Village in Turkey

Ersil
- Village
- Location in Turkey
- Coordinates: 41°25′29″N 34°01′45″E
- Country: Turkey
- Province: Kastamonu
- District: Taşköprü
- Population (2021): 299
- Time zone: UTC+3 (TRT)

Ersil is a village in the Taşköprü District of Kastamonu Province in Turkey. Its population is 299 (2021).
