= Ulus, Bartın =

Ulus
- Municipality
- Location within Turkey
- Coordinates: 41°35′10″N 32°38′26″E
- Country: Turkey
- Province: Bartın
- District: Ulus

Government
  - Mayor: Hasan Hüseyin Uzun (AKP)
- Population (2021): 3,926
- Time zone: UTC+3 (TRT)
- Postal code: 74600
- Climate: Cfb
- Website: www.ulus.bel.tr

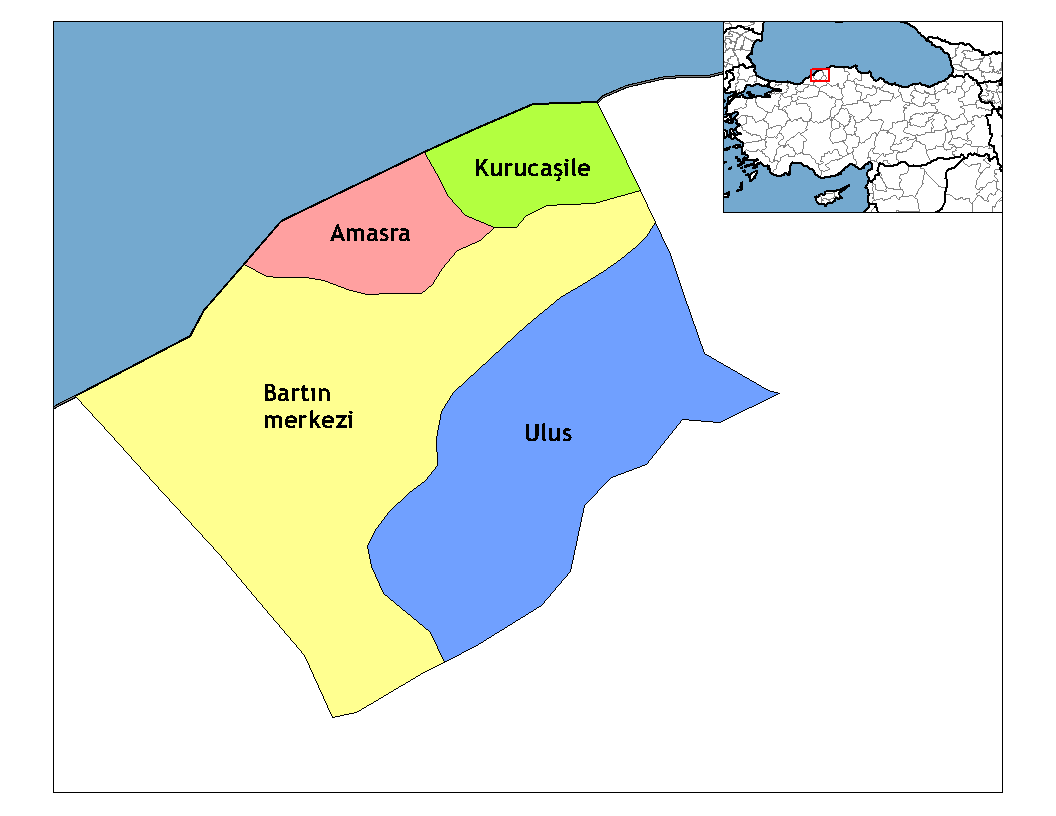
Map of the districts of Bartin province in Turkey, showing Ulus to the South

Ulus is a town in Bartın Province in the Black Sea region of Turkey. The town continues the ancient Greek colony of Olous (Ωλους). It is the seat of Ulus District. Its population is 3,926 (2021). The mayor is Hasan Hüseyin Uzun (AKP).
