= Arpacık, Ulus =

Arpacık
- Village
- Location in Turkey
- Coordinates: 41.6592°N 32.7007°E
- Country: Turkey
- Province: Bartın
- District: Ulus
- Population (2021): 160
- Time zone: UTC+3 (TRT)

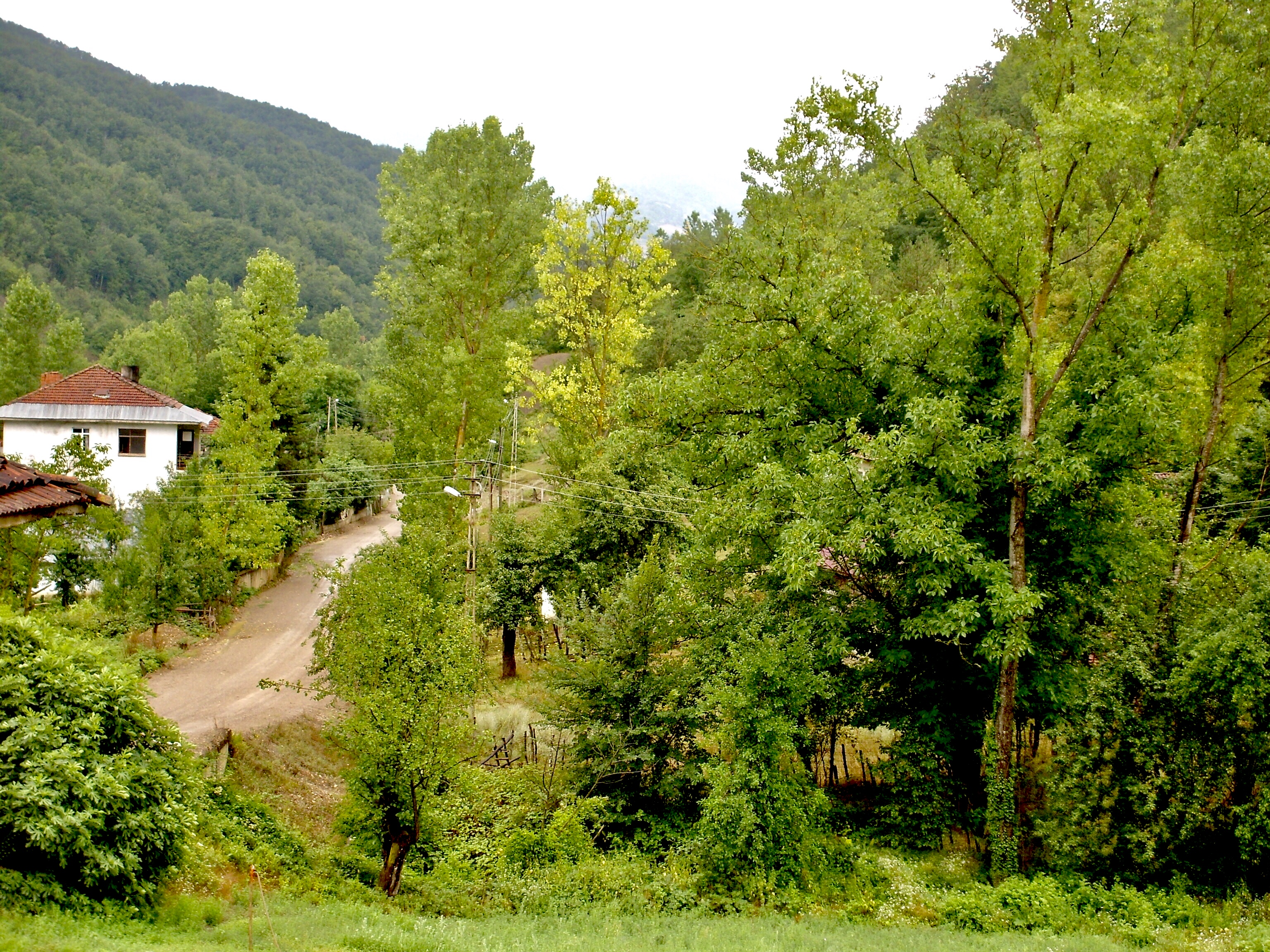
Arpacık, Ulus

Arpacık is a village in the Ulus District, Bartın Province, Turkey. Its population is 160 (2021).
