= Eskioğlu, Taşköprü =

Village in Turkey

Eskioğlu
- Village
- Location in Turkey
- Coordinates: 41°24′18″N 34°15′12″E
- Country: Turkey
- Province: Kastamonu
- District: Taşköprü
- Population (2021): 54
- Time zone: UTC+3 (TRT)

Eskioğlu is a village in the Taşköprü District of Kastamonu Province in Turkey. Its population is 54 (2021).
