= Avdullar, Mudurnu =

Avdullar
- Village
- Location within Turkey
- Coordinates: 40.5828°N 30.8820°E
- Country: Turkey
- Province: Bolu
- District: Mudurnu
- Population (2021): 239
- Time zone: UTC+3 (TRT)

Avdullar is a village in the Mudurnu District, Bolu Province, Turkey. Its population is 239 (2021).
