= Dibektaş, Ulus =

Dibektaş
- Village
- Location within Turkey
- Coordinates: 41.4255°N 32.4318°E
- Country: Turkey
- Province: Bartın
- District: Ulus
- Population (2021): 196
- Time zone: UTC+3 (TRT)

Dibektaş is a village in the Ulus District, Bartın Province, Turkey. Its population is 196 (2021).
