= Karacaoğlu, Taşköprü =

Village in Turkey

Karacaoğlu
- Village
- Location in Turkey
- Coordinates: 41°30′23″N 34°04′42″E
- Country: Turkey
- Province: Kastamonu
- District: Taşköprü
- Population (2021): 156
- Time zone: UTC+3 (TRT)

Karacaoğlu is a village in the Taşköprü District of Kastamonu Province in Turkey. Its population is 156 (2021).
