= Şahinçatı, Taşköprü =

Village in Turkey

Şahinçatı
- Village
- Location in Turkey
- Coordinates: 41°13′48″N 34°11′49″E
- Country: Turkey
- Province: Kastamonu
- District: Taşköprü
- Population (2021): 58
- Time zone: UTC+3 (TRT)

Şahinçatı is a village in the Taşköprü District of Kastamonu Province in Turkey. Its population is 58 (2021).
