= Yılanlar, Ulus =

Yılanlar
- Village
- Location within Turkey
- Coordinates: 41°27′N 32°29′E
- Country: Turkey
- Province: Bartın
- District: Ulus
- Population (2021): 261
- Time zone: UTC+3 (TRT)

Yılanlar is a village in the Ulus District, Bartın Province, Turkey. Its population is 261 (2021).
