= Kayadibi, Taşköprü =

Village in Turkey

Kayadibi
- Village
- Location in Turkey
- Coordinates: 41°43′25″N 34°12′07″E
- Country: Turkey
- Province: Kastamonu
- District: Taşköprü
- Population (2021): 160
- Time zone: UTC+3 (TRT)

Kayadibi is a village in the Taşköprü District of Kastamonu Province in Turkey. Its population is 160 (2021).
