= Alamaşişli, Taşköprü =

Village in Turkey

Alamaşişli
- Village
- Location in Turkey
- Coordinates: 41°28′42″N 34°07′37″E
- Country: Turkey
- Province: Kastamonu
- District: Taşköprü
- Population (2021): 122
- Time zone: UTC+3 (TRT)

Alamaşişli is a village in the Taşköprü District of Kastamonu Province in Turkey. Its population is 122 (2021).
