= Bahçecik, Ulus =

Bahçecik
- Village
- Location within Turkey
- Coordinates: 41.4673°N 32.6415°E
- Country: Turkey
- Province: Bartın
- District: Ulus
- Population (2021): 55
- Time zone: UTC+3 (TRT)

Bahçecik is a village in the Ulus District, Bartın Province, Turkey. Its population is 55 (2021).
