= Çepni, Mudurnu =

Çepni
- Village
- Location within Turkey
- Coordinates: 40.5612°N 31.2517°E
- Country: Turkey
- Province: Bolu
- District: Mudurnu
- Population (2021): 223
- Time zone: UTC+3 (TRT)

Çepni is a village in the Mudurnu District, Bolu Province, Turkey. Its population is 223 (2021).
