= Afşar, Taşköprü =

Village in Turkey

Afşar
- Village
- Location in Turkey
- Coordinates: 41.575°N 34.135°E
- Country: Turkey
- Province: Kastamonu
- District: Taşköprü
- Population (2021): 209
- Time zone: UTC+3 (TRT)

Afşar is a village in the Taşköprü District of Kastamonu Province in Turkey. Its population is 209 (2021).
