= Kacık, Mudurnu =

Village in Turkey

Kacık
- Village
- Location in Turkey
- Coordinates: 40°23′12″N 31°18′15″E
- Country: Turkey
- Province: Bolu
- District: Mudurnu
- Population (2021): 25
- Time zone: UTC+3 (TRT)

Kacık (also: Kaçık) is a village in the Mudurnu District of Bolu Province in Turkey. Its population is 25 (2021).
