= Alpagut, Mudurnu =

Alpagut
- Village
- Location within Turkey
- Coordinates: 40.5484°N 31.2402°E
- Country: Turkey
- Province: Bolu
- District: Mudurnu
- Population (2021): 335
- Time zone: UTC+3 (TRT)

Alpagut is a village in the Mudurnu District, Bolu Province, Turkey. Its population is 335 (2021).
