= Hüsamettindere, Mudurnu =

Village in Turkey

Hüsamettindere
- Village
- Location in Turkey
- Coordinates: 40°24′N 31°07′E
- Country: Turkey
- Province: Bolu
- District: Mudurnu
- Population (2021): 156
- Time zone: UTC+3 (TRT)

Hüsamettindere is a village in the Mudurnu District of Bolu Province in Turkey. Its population is 156 (2021).
