= Delice, Mudurnu =

Delice
- Village
- Location within Turkey
- Country: Turkey
- Province: Bolu
- District: Mudurnu
- Population (2021): 117
- Time zone: UTC+3 (TRT)

Delice is a village in the Mudurnu District, Bolu Province, Turkey. Its population is 117 (2021).
