= Elmacıkdere, Mudurnu =

Elmacıkdere
- Village
- Location within Turkey
- Coordinates: 40°36′N 31°08′E
- Country: Turkey
- Province: Bolu
- District: Mudurnu
- Population (2021): 104
- Time zone: UTC+3 (TRT)

Elmacıkdere is a village in the Mudurnu District, Bolu Province, Turkey. Its population is 104 (2021).
