= Derebeysibey, Taşköprü =

Village in Turkey

Derebeysibey
- Village
- Location in Turkey
- Coordinates: 41°24′36″N 33°56′48″E
- Country: Turkey
- Province: Kastamonu
- District: Taşköprü
- Population (2021): 150
- Time zone: UTC+3 (TRT)

Derebeysibey is a village in the Taşköprü District of Kastamonu Province in Turkey. Its population is 150 (2021).
