= Urgancı, Taşköprü =

Village in Turkey

Urgancı
- Village
- Location in Turkey
- Coordinates: 41°31′37″N 34°02′20″E
- Country: Turkey
- Province: Kastamonu
- District: Taşköprü
- Population (2021): 206
- Time zone: UTC+3 (TRT)

Urgancı is a village in the Taşköprü District of Kastamonu Province in Turkey. Its population is 206 (2021).
