= Sarıkavak, Taşköprü =

Village in Turkey

Sarıkavak
- Village
- Location in Turkey
- Coordinates: 41°23′21″N 34°09′18″E
- Country: Turkey
- Province: Kastamonu
- District: Taşköprü
- Population (2021): 109
- Time zone: UTC+3 (TRT)

Sarıkavak is a village in the Taşköprü District of Kastamonu Province in Turkey. Its population is 109 (2021).
