= Akyokuş, Mudurnu =

Akyokuş
- Village
- Location within Turkey
- Coordinates: 40.5625°N 30.9266°E
- Country: Turkey
- Province: Bolu
- District: Mudurnu
- Population (2021): 136
- Time zone: UTC+3 (TRT)

Akyokuş is a village in the Mudurnu District, Bolu Province, Turkey. Its population is 136 (2021).
