= Karacakaya, Taşköprü =

Village in Turkey

Karacakaya
- Village
- Location in Turkey
- Coordinates: 41.432°N 34.153°E
- Country: Turkey
- Province: Kastamonu
- District: Taşköprü
- Population (2021): 60
- Time zone: UTC+3 (TRT)

Karacakaya is a village in the Taşköprü District of Kastamonu Province in Turkey. Its population is 60 (2021).
