= Pirahmetli, Taşköprü =

Village in Turkey

Pirahmetli
- Village
- Location in Turkey
- Coordinates: 41°11′30″N 34°13′32″E
- Country: Turkey
- Province: Kastamonu
- District: Taşköprü
- Population (2021): 84
- Time zone: UTC+3 (TRT)

Pirahmetli is a village in the Taşköprü District of Kastamonu Province in Turkey. Its population is 84 (2021).
