= Beyköy, Taşköprü =

Village in Turkey

Beyköy
- Village
- Location in Turkey
- Coordinates: 41.591°N 34.175°E
- Country: Turkey
- Province: Kastamonu
- District: Taşköprü
- Population (2021): 308
- Time zone: UTC+3 (TRT)

Beyköy is a village in the Taşköprü District of Kastamonu Province in Turkey. Its population is 308 (2021).
