= Yukarıçayırcık, Taşköprü =

Village in Turkey

Yukarıçayırcık
- Village
- Location in Turkey
- Coordinates: 41°29′50″N 34°09′25″E
- Country: Turkey
- Province: Kastamonu
- District: Taşköprü
- Population (2021): 188
- Time zone: UTC+3 (TRT)

Yukarıçayırcık is a village in the Taşköprü District of Kastamonu Province in Turkey. Its population is 188 (2021).
