= Çit, Taşköprü =

Village in Turkey

Çit
- Village
- Location in Turkey
- Coordinates: 41.427°N 34.097°E
- Country: Turkey
- Province: Kastamonu
- District: Taşköprü
- Population (2021): 224
- Time zone: UTC+3 (TRT)

Çit (also: Çitköy) is a village in the Taşköprü District of Kastamonu Province in Turkey. Its population is 224 (2021).
