= Boyundurcak, Taşköprü =

Village in Turkey

Boyundurcak
- Village
- Location in Turkey
- Coordinates: 41°27′02″N 34°00′14″E
- Country: Turkey
- Province: Kastamonu
- District: Taşköprü
- Population (2021): 314
- Time zone: UTC+3 (TRT)

Boyundurcak is a village in the Taşköprü District of Kastamonu Province in Turkey. Its population is 314 (2021).
