= Yeşilyurt, Taşköprü =

Village in Turkey

Yeşilyurt
- Village
- Location in Turkey
- Coordinates: 41°28′21″N 34°03′40″E
- Country: Turkey
- Province: Kastamonu
- District: Taşköprü
- Population (2021): 114
- Time zone: UTC+3 (TRT)

Yeşilyurt is a village in the Taşköprü District of Kastamonu Province in Turkey. Its population is 114 (2021).
