= Öncüler, Ulus =

Öncüler
- Village
- Location within Turkey
- Coordinates: 41.4371°N 32.6140°E
- Country: Turkey
- Province: Bartın
- District: Ulus
- Population (2021): 69
- Time zone: UTC+3 (TRT)

Öncüler is a village in the Ulus District, Bartın Province, Turkey. Its population is 69 (2021).
