= Dodurga, Ulus =

Dodurga
- Village
- Location within Turkey
- Coordinates: 41.5773°N 32.6171°E
- Country: Turkey
- Province: Bartın
- District: Ulus
- Population (2021): 159
- Time zone: UTC+3 (TRT)

Dodurga is a village in the Ulus District, Bartın Province, Turkey. Its population is 159 (2021).
