= Bostancılar, Mudurnu =

Bostancılar
- Village
- Location within Turkey
- Coordinates: 40.3871°N 31.1959°E
- Country: Turkey
- Province: Bolu
- District: Mudurnu
- Population (2021): 138
- Time zone: UTC+3 (TRT)

Bostancılar is a village in the Mudurnu District, Bolu Province, Turkey. Its population is 138 (2021).
