= Aşağıçamlı, Ulus =

Aşağıçamlı
- Village
- Location within Turkey
- Coordinates: 41.7021°N 32.8148°E
- Country: Turkey
- Province: Bartın
- District: Ulus
- Population (2021): 142
- Time zone: UTC+3 (TRT)

Aşağıçamlı is a village in the Ulus District, Bartın Province, Turkey. Its population is 142 (2021).
