= Aktaş, Ulus =

Aktaş
- Village
- Location within Turkey
- Coordinates: 41.5360°N 32.5719°E
- Country: Turkey
- Province: Bartın
- District: Ulus
- Population (2021): 102
- Time zone: UTC+3 (TRT)

Aktaş is a village in the Ulus District, Bartın Province, Turkey. Its population is 102 (2021).
