= Üçsaray, Ulus =

Üçsaray
- Village
- Location within Turkey
- Coordinates: 41.4235°N 32.5923°E
- Country: Turkey
- Province: Bartın
- District: Ulus
- Population (2021): 188
- Time zone: UTC+3 (TRT)

Üçsaray is a village in the Ulus District, Bartın Province, Turkey. Its population is 188 (2021).
