= Döngeller, Ulus =

Döngeller
- Village
- Location within Turkey
- Coordinates: 41.4047°N 32.4488°E
- Country: Turkey
- Province: Bartın
- District: Ulus
- Population (2021): 225
- Time zone: UTC+3 (TRT)

Döngeller is a village in the Ulus District, Bartın Province, Turkey. Its population is 225 (2021).
