= Sarpun, Taşköprü =

Village in Turkey

Sarpun
- Village
- Location in Turkey
- Coordinates: 41°42′16″N 34°16′38″E
- Country: Turkey
- Province: Kastamonu
- District: Taşköprü
- Population (2021): 93
- Time zone: UTC+3 (TRT)

Sarpun is a village in the Taşköprü District of Kastamonu Province in Turkey. Its population is 93 (2021).
