= Çavuşköy, Ulus =

Çavuşköy
- Village
- Location within Turkey
- Coordinates: 41.5023°N 32.5293°E
- Country: Turkey
- Province: Bartın
- District: Ulus
- Population (2021): 157
- Time zone: UTC+3 (TRT)

Çavuşköy is a village in the Ulus District, Bartın Province, Turkey. Its population is 157 (2021).
