= Alatarla, Taşköprü =

Village in Turkey

Alatarla
- Village
- Location in Turkey
- Coordinates: 41°29′25″N 34°01′29″E
- Country: Turkey
- Province: Kastamonu
- District: Taşköprü
- Population (2021): 1,098
- Time zone: UTC+3 (TRT)

Alatarla is a village in the Taşköprü District of Kastamonu Province in Turkey. Its population is 1,098 (2021).
