= Mangırlar, Mudurnu =

Village in Turkey

Mangırlar
- Village
- Location in Turkey
- Coordinates: 40°33′50″N 31°19′26″E
- Country: Turkey
- Province: Bolu
- District: Mudurnu
- Population (2021): 252
- Time zone: UTC+3 (TRT)

Mangırlar is a village in the Mudurnu District of Bolu Province in Turkey. Its population is 252 (2021).
