= Kızılcaörhen, Taşköprü =

Village in Turkey

Kızılcaörhen
- Village
- Location within Turkey
- Coordinates: 41°31′54″N 33°59′28″E
- Country: Turkey
- Province: Kastamonu
- District: Taşköprü
- Population (2021): 190
- Time zone: UTC+3 (TRT)

Kızılcaörhen is a village in the Taşköprü District of Kastamonu Province in Turkey. Its population is 190 (2021).
