= Bekirli, Taşköprü =

Village in Turkey

Bekirli
- Village
- Location in Turkey
- Coordinates: 41.305°N 34.274°E
- Country: Turkey
- Province: Kastamonu
- District: Taşköprü
- Population (2021): 99
- Time zone: UTC+3 (TRT)

Bekirli is a village in the Taşköprü District of Kastamonu Province in Turkey. Its population is 99 (2021).
