= Kadıköy, Taşköprü =

Village in Turkey

Kadıköy
- Village
- Location in Turkey
- Coordinates: 41.481°N 34.163°E
- Country: Turkey
- Province: Kastamonu
- District: Taşköprü
- Population (2021): 68
- Time zone: UTC+3 (TRT)

Kadıköy is a village in the Taşköprü District of Kastamonu Province in Turkey. Its population is 68 (2021).
