= Doğanköy, Ulus =

Doğanköy
- Village
- Location within Turkey
- Coordinates: 41.423°N 32.470°E
- Country: Turkey
- Province: Bartın
- District: Ulus
- Population (2021): 183
- Time zone: UTC+3 (TRT)

Doğanköy is a village in the Ulus District, Bartın Province, Turkey. Its population is 183 (2021).
