= Kızıllar, Ulus =

Kızıllar
- Village
- Location within Turkey
- Coordinates: 41.3965°N 32.5055°E
- Country: Turkey
- Province: Bartın
- District: Ulus
- Population (2021): 302
- Time zone: UTC+3 (TRT)

Kızıllar is a village in the Ulus District, Bartın Province, Turkey. Its population is 302 (2021).
