= Ağaköy, Ulus =

Ağaköy
- Village
- Location within Turkey
- Coordinates: 41.6226°N 32.7058°E
- Country: Turkey
- Province: Bartın
- District: Ulus
- Population (2021): 333
- Time zone: UTC+3 (TRT)

Ağaköy is a village in the Ulus District, Bartın Province, Turkey. Its population is 333 (2021).
