= İğneciler, Ulus =

İğneciler
- Village
- Location within Turkey
- Coordinates: 41.6367°N 32.6532°E
- Country: Turkey
- Province: Bartın
- District: Ulus
- Population (2021): 164
- Time zone: UTC+3 (TRT)

İğneciler is a village in the Ulus District, Bartın Province, Turkey. Its population is 164 (2021).
