= İğneciler, Mudurnu =

Village in Turkey

İğneciler
- Village
- Location in Turkey
- Coordinates: 40°35′34″N 31°08′49″E
- Country: Turkey
- Province: Bolu
- District: Mudurnu
- Population (2021): 154
- Time zone: UTC+3 (TRT)

İğneciler is a village in the Mudurnu District of Bolu Province in Turkey. Its population is 154 (2021).
