= Tokaş, Taşköprü =

Village in Turkey

Tokaş
- Village
- Location in Turkey
- Coordinates: 41°25′33″N 34°22′28″E
- Country: Turkey
- Province: Kastamonu
- District: Taşköprü
- Population (2021): 66
- Time zone: UTC+3 (TRT)

Tokaş is a village in the Taşköprü District of Kastamonu Province in Turkey. Its population is 66 (2021).
