= Taşçılar, Mudurnu =

Village in Turkey

Taşçılar
- Village
- Location in Turkey
- Coordinates: 40°21′33″N 31°13′42″E
- Country: Turkey
- Province: Bolu
- District: Mudurnu
- Population (2021): 74
- Time zone: UTC+3 (TRT)

Taşçılar is a village in the Mudurnu District of Bolu Province in Turkey. Its population is 74 (2021).
