= Taşçılar, Taşköprü =

Village in Turkey

Taşçılar
- Village
- Location in Turkey
- Coordinates: 41.197°N 34.143°E
- Country: Turkey
- Province: Kastamonu
- District: Taşköprü
- Population (2021): 62
- Time zone: UTC+3 (TRT)

Taşçılar is a village in the Taşköprü District of Kastamonu Province in Turkey. Its population is 62 (2021).
