= Aşağıköy, Ulus =

Aşağıköy
- Village
- Location within Turkey
- Coordinates: 41.6198°N 32.6392°E
- Country: Turkey
- Province: Bartın
- District: Ulus
- Population (2021): 268
- Time zone: UTC+3 (TRT)

Aşağıköy is a village in the Ulus District, Bartın Province, Turkey. Its population is 268 (2021).
