= Akdeğirmen, Taşköprü =

Village in Turkey

Akdeğirmen
- Village
- Location in Turkey
- Coordinates: 41.468°N 34.012°E
- Country: Turkey
- Province: Kastamonu
- District: Taşköprü
- Population (2021): 311
- Time zone: UTC+3 (TRT)

Akdeğirmen is a village in the Taşköprü District of Kastamonu Province in Turkey. Its population is 311 (2021).
