= Ulukaya, Ulus =

Ulukaya
- Village
- Location within Turkey
- Coordinates: 41.6680°N 32.7635°E
- Country: Turkey
- Province: Bartın
- District: Ulus
- Population (2021): 141
- Time zone: UTC+3 (TRT)

Ulukaya is a village in the Ulus District, Bartın Province, Turkey. Its population is 141 (2021).
