= Karapürçek, Taşköprü =

Village in Turkey

Karapürçek
- Village
- Location in Turkey
- Coordinates: 41.567°N 34.175°E
- Country: Turkey
- Province: Kastamonu
- District: Taşköprü
- Population (2021): 241
- Time zone: UTC+3 (TRT)

Karapürçek is a village in the Taşköprü District of Kastamonu Province in Turkey. Its population is 241 (2021).
