= Kayıboyu, Bilecik =

Kayı Boyu
- Neighbourhood
- Location in Turkey Kayı Boyu (Marmara)
- Coordinates: 40°07′N 30°00′E
- Country: Turkey
- Province: Bilecik
- District: Bilecik
- Municipality: Bilecik
- Elevation: 300 m (1,000 ft)
- Population (2021): 902
- Time zone: UTC+3 (TRT)
- Postal code: 11230
- Area code: 0228

Kayı Boyu is a neighbourhood of the city Bilecik, Bilecik District, Bilecik Province, Turkey. Its population is 902 (2021). It is about 5 kilometres (3.1 mi) south of Bilecik. The state highway D.650 is to the west and the mountains are to the east of the village. The village had a mixed population (Turks and Greeks) before the First World War. But during the Greek occupation of the Western Anatolia in 1920–1922, the Turkish population suffered heavily and after the Turkish War of Independence, the Greeks left the village. Being near the city, most of the village population is composed of white or blue collar people.
