= Pelitözü, Bilecik =

Pelitözü
- Neighbourhood
- Location in Turkey Pelitözü (Marmara)
- Coordinates: 40°10′40″N 29°57′40″E
- Country: Turkey
- Province: Bilecik
- District: Bilecik
- Municipality: Bilecik
- Population (2021): 2,225
- Time zone: UTC+3 (TRT)

Pelitözü is a neighbourhood of the city Bilecik, Bilecik District, Bilecik Province, Turkey. Its population is 2,225 (2021).
