= Taşköprü, Kastamonu =

Taşköprü
- Municipality
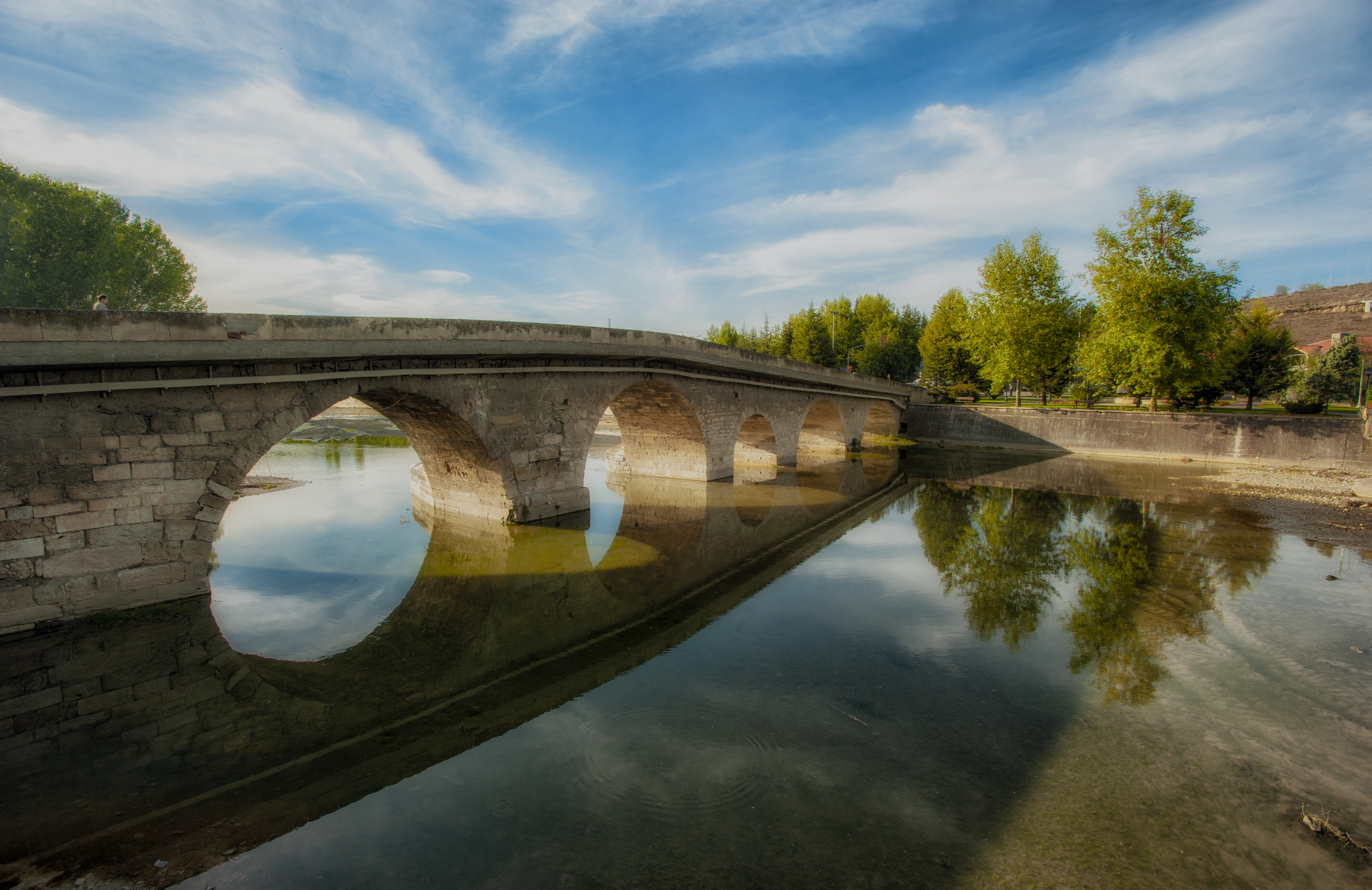
- The stone bridge in Taşköprü

- Coat of arms

- Location within Turkey
- Coordinates: 41°30′35″N 34°12′51″E
- Country: Turkey
- Province: Kastamonu
- District: Taşköprü

Government
  - Mayor: Abdullah Çatal (MHP)
- Elevation: 553 m (1,814 ft)
- Population (2021): 17,048
- Time zone: UTC+3 (TRT)
- Area code: 0366
- Climate: Cfb
- Website: taskopru.bel.tr

Taşköprü (Turkish: taş köprü "stone bridge") is a town in Kastamonu Province in the Black Sea region of Turkey. It is the seat of Taşköprü District. Its population is 17,048 (2021). The town lies at an elevation of 553 m (1,814 ft).

The town takes its name from the stone bridge constructed in the 13th century by the Chobanids over the Gök River. The 68 meter span is supported on seven arches and still carries automobile traffic. Taşköprü is 42 km from Kastamonu. It is noted for its garlic; the name Taşköprü Sarımsağı is a protected designation of origin (PDO).

== History ==
In its history, the district has been one of the important settlements of several civilizations. In 64 BC it became part of the Roman Empire. During Ottoman rule, Taşköprü was part of Kastamonu Eyalet, and later Kastamonu Vilayet.

== See also ==
- Pompeiopolis
