= List of municipalities in Antalya Province =

This is the List of municipalities in Antalya Province, Turkey as of October 2007.

== Municipalities ==
List is sorted alphabetically A-Z, as Districts->Municipalities.

District	Municipality
Akseki	Akseki
Akseki	Bademli
Akseki	Cevizli
Akseki	Güçlüköy
Akseki	Kuyucak
Akseki	Süleymaniye
Akseki	Yarpuz
Alanya	Alanya
Alanya	Avsallar
Alanya	Cikcilli
Alanya	Çıplaklı
Alanya	Demirtaş
Alanya	Emişbeleni
Alanya	Güzelbağ
Alanya	İncekum
Alanya	Kargıcak
Alanya	Kestel
Alanya	Konaklı
Alanya	Mahmutlar
Alanya	Oba
Alanya	Okurcalar
Alanya	Payallar
Alanya	Tosmur
Alanya	Türkler
Antalya (Merkez)	Aksu
Antalya	Bademağacı
Antalya	Çalkaya
Antalya	Çığlık
Antalya	Dağbeli
Antalya	Doyran
Antalya	Döşemealtı
Antalya	Düzlerçamı
Antalya	Ekşili
Antalya	Karaöz
Antalya	Karaveliler
Antalya	Kepez
Antalya	Pınarlı
Antalya	Varsak
Antalya	Yeşilbayır
Antalya	Yurtpınar
Demre	Beymelek
Demre	Demre
Elmalı	Akçay
Elmalı	Elmalı
Elmalı	Yuva
Finike	Finike
Finike	Hasyurt
Finike	Sahilkent
Finike	Turunçova
Finike	Yeşilyurt
Gazipaşa	Gazipaşa
Gazipaşa	Kahyalar
Gündoğmuş	Gündoğmuş
Gündoğmuş	Köprülü
Gündoğmuş	Ortaköy
Gündoğmuş	Senir
İbradı	İbradı
İbradı	Ormana
Kaş	Gömbe
Kaş	Kalkan
Kaş	Kaş
Kaş	Kınık
Kaş	Ova
Kaş	Yeşilköy
Kemer	Beldibi
Kemer	Çamyuva
Kemer	Göynük
Kemer	Kemer
Kemer	Tekirova
Konyaaltı	Konyaaltı
Korkuteli	Bozova
Korkuteli	Büyükköy
Korkuteli	Çomaklı
Korkuteli	Korkuteli
Korkuteli	Küçükköy
Korkuteli	Yelten
Korkuteli	Yeşilyayla
Kumluca	Beykonak
Kumluca	Çavuşköy
Kumluca	Kumluca
Kumluca	Mavikent
Manavgat	Çolaklı
Manavgat	Evrenseki
Manavgat	Gündoğdu
Manavgat	Ilıca
Manavgat	Kızılot
Manavgat	Manavgat
Manavgat	Oymapınar
Manavgat	Sarılar
Manavgat	Side
Manavgat	Taşağıl
Muratpaşa	Muratpaşa
Serik	Abdurrahmanlar
Serik	Belek
Serik	Belkıs
Serik	Boğazkent
Serik	Çandır
Serik	Gebiz
Serik	Kadriye
Serik	Karadayı
Serik	Serik
Serik	Yukarıkocayatak

== Changes in 2014 ==
According to Law act no 6360, belde (town) municipalities within provinces with more than 750000 population (so called Metropolitan municipalities in Turkey) were abolished as of 30 March 2014. 74 belde municipalities in the above list are now defunct. The list is kept for historical reference.
