= Pınarbaşı =

Pınarbaşı is a Turkish place name and may refer to:

- Pınarbaşı, Acıpayam
- Pınarbaşı, Akseki, a village in Antalya Province
- Pınarbaşı, Bayramiç
- Pınarbaşı, Besni, a village in Adıyaman Province
- Pınarbaşı, Bismil
- Pınarbaşı, Bornova, a neighborhood in Bornova district of Izmir Province, Turkey
- Pınarbaşı, Çelikhan, a village in Adıyaman Province
- Pınarbaşı, Cyprus, a village in northern Cyprus
- Pınarbaşı, Erdemli, a village in Mersin Province
- Pınarbaşı, Ezine, a village in Çanakkale Province, held to be the site of Troy in the 19th century before the excavations at Hisarlik
- Pınarbaşı Gölü, an archaeological site in Turkey in Konya Province
- Pınarbaşı, Gülağaç, a village in Aksaray Province
- Pınarbaşı, Haymana, a village in Ankara Province
- Pınarbaşı, Kaş, a village in Antalya Province
- Pınarbaşı, Kastamonu, a town in Kastamonu Province
- Pınarbaşı District, Kastamonu, a district in Kastamonu Province
- Pınarbaşı, Kayseri, a district in Kayseri Province
- Pınarbaşı, Kemer
- Pınarbaşı, Mecitözü
- Pınarbaşı, Ortaköy, a village in Aksaray Province
