= Kayabükü =

Kayabükü can refer to the following villages in Turkey:

- Kayabükü, Beypazarı
- Kayabükü, Gündoğmuş
- Kayabükü, Mengen
- Kayabükü, Pınarbaşı
