= Aşağıoba =

Aşağıoba (literally "lower nomad encampment") is a Turkic place name that may refer to the following places:

- Aşağıoba, Bismil
- Aşağıoba, Döşemealtı, a village in the district of Antalya, Antalya Province, Turkey
- Aşağıoba, Serik, a village in the district of Serik, Antalya Province, Turkey
- Aşağıoba, Khachmaz, a village in the Khachmaz Rayon, Azerbaijan
