= Xuray =

Xuray or Khuray may refer to:

- Xuray, Khachmaz, Azerbaijan
- Xuray, Qusar, Azerbaijan
