= Çanakpınar =

Çanakpınar can refer to:

- Çanakpınar, Akseki
- Çanakpınar, Oltu
