= Dutluca =

Dutluca may refer to:

- Dutluca, Akseki, a village in Antalya Province, Turkey
- Dutluca, Alaca, a village in Çorum Province, Turkey
- Dutluca, Burhaniye, a village in Balıkesir Province, Turkey
- Dutluca, Kemaliye, a village in Erzincan Province, Turkey
- Dutluca, Musabeyli, a village in Kilis Province, Turkey
- Dutluca, Oğuzeli, a village in Gaziantep Province, Turkey
- Dutluca, Sarıçam, a village in Adana Province, Turkey
