= Villa Rose =

Mansion in Aleppo

Coordinates: 36°12′38″N 37°08′59″E

- فيلا روز
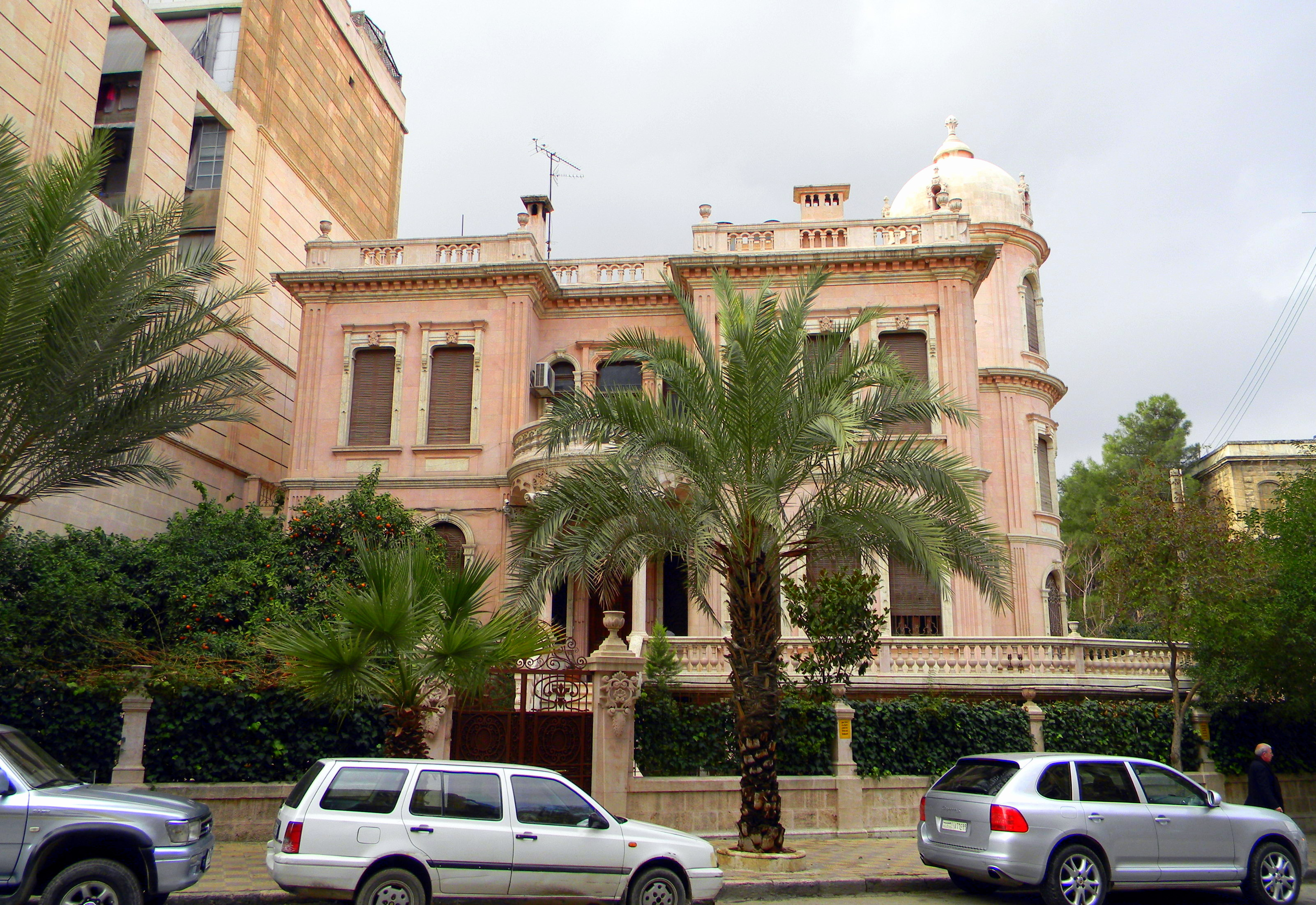
- Villa Rose
- Interactive map of the Villa Rose area

General information
- Type: Palace
- Architectural style: Baroque
- Location: Aleppo, Syria, Al-Aziziyah District, Aleppo, Syria
- Completed: 1928
- Client: Subhi Kabbabé
- Owner: Abdul Aziz al-Sukhni

Technical details
- Floor count: 3

Villa Rose (Arabic: فيلا روز), is a private mansion in the Syrian city of Aleppo dating back to 1928. Built by the Aleppine wealthy businessman Subhi Kabbabé during the days of the French Mandate for Syria, Villa Rose is the first building in Aleppo (and probably Syria) to feature pure European architectural elements, mainly based on Baroque principles.

It is colloquially known as the Villa Rose because of the pink-colored stones of the building. In 1948, the building was purchased by Dr. Gregory Kassis who turned it into a maternity hospital. During the 1960s, the building was about to be dismantled by its new owner Jean-Frederic Rabbat. However, upon the demand of the citizens, then-governor of Aleppo Abdulghani al-Saadawi mediated the dispute, convincing the owner to preserve the palace. In 1983, the mansion was sold to a new group of owners and the building was listed among the architectural heritage monuments of Aleppo, in order to prevent any possible destruction by its future owners. Currently, Villa Rose is owned by the local businessman Abdul Aziz al-Sukhni who is among the tycoons of pharmaceutical industry in Syria.
