= Ilıcaköy =

Ilıcaköy can refer to:

- Ilıcaköy, Hınıs
- Ilıcaköy, Gazipaşa
- Ilıcaköy, Antalya
- Ilıcaköy, Taşova
- Ilıcaköy, Kozan
