= Cemerler, Akseki =

Cemerler
- Neighbourhood
- Location in Turkey
- Coordinates: 36°57′N 31°46′E
- Country: Turkey
- Province: Antalya
- District: Akseki
- Population (2022): 93
- Time zone: UTC+3 (TRT)

Cemerler is a neighbourhood in the municipality and district of Akseki, Antalya Province, Turkey. Its population is 93 (2022).
