= Büyükalan, Akseki =

Büyükalan
- Neighbourhood
- Location in Turkey
- Coordinates: 37.0003°N 31.7436°E
- Country: Turkey
- Province: Antalya
- District: Akseki
- Population (2022): 175
- Time zone: UTC+3 (TRT)

Büyükalan is a neighbourhood in the municipality and district of Akseki, Antalya Province, Turkey.
