= Taşlıca, Akseki =

Taşlıca
- Neighbourhood
- Location in Turkey
- Coordinates: 36.9030°N 31.7675°E
- Country: Turkey
- Province: Antalya
- District: Akseki
- Population (2022): 529
- Time zone: UTC+3 (TRT)

Taşlıca is a neighbourhood in the municipality and district of Akseki, Antalya Province, Turkey. Its population is 529 (2022).
