= Sinanhoca, Akseki =

Sinanhoca
- Neighbourhood
- Location in Turkey
- Coordinates: 36°58′N 31°37′E
- Country: Turkey
- Province: Antalya
- District: Akseki
- Population (2022): 179
- Time zone: UTC+3 (TRT)

Sinanhoca is a neighbourhood in the municipality and district of Akseki, Antalya Province, Turkey. Its population is 179 (2022).
