= Dereli, Döşemealtı =

Dereli
- Neighbourhood
- Country: Turkey
- Province: Antalya
- District: Döşemealtı
- Population (2022): 174
- Time zone: UTC+3 (TRT)

Dereli is a neighbourhood of the municipality and district of Döşemealtı, Antalya Province, Turkey. Its population is 174 (2022). This small neighborhood is part of a larger district that includes several other neighborhoods. Döşemealtı itself is a municipality and district in Antalya Province. The district covers an area of 687 square kilometers and had a population of 79,495 in 2022. It's located about 20 kilometers north of Antalya city center and is known for its historical significance, including the Döşemealtı rug from the 19th century.

Historically, Dereli was established by immigrants who migrated during the turmoil in the Selanik region between 1877-1878. These immigrants were known as "Muhacirs," and they initially settled in places referred to as Yenikent or Yenişehir, which are now part of modern-day Greece. The neighborhood of Dereli in Döşemealtı is characterized as a Muhacir neighborhood, marking its historical roots.
