= Killik, Döşemealtı =

Killik
- Neighbourhood
- Country: Turkey
- Province: Antalya
- District: Döşemealtı
- Population (2022): 1,000
- Time zone: UTC+3 (TRT)

Killik is a neighbourhood of the municipality and district of Döşemealtı, Antalya Province, Turkey. Its population is 1,000 (2022).
