= Çaltılıçukur, Akseki =

Çaltılıçukur
- Neighbourhood
- Location in Turkey
- Coordinates: 36°52′N 31°53′E
- Country: Turkey
- Province: Antalya
- District: Akseki
- Population (2022): 127
- Time zone: UTC+3 (TRT)

Çaltılıçukur is a neighbourhood in the municipality and district of Akseki, Antalya Province, Turkey. Its population is 127 (2022).
