= Güneycik, Gündoğmuş =

Güneycik
- Neighbourhood
- Location in Turkey
- Coordinates: 36°45′55″N 31°46′41″E
- Country: Turkey
- Province: Antalya
- District: Gündoğmuş
- Population (2022): 172
- Time zone: UTC+3 (TRT)

Güneycik is a neighbourhood in the municipality and district of Gündoğmuş, Antalya Province, Turkey. Its population is 172 (2022).
