= Değirmenlik, Akseki =

Değirmenlik
- Neighbourhood
- Location in Turkey
- Coordinates: 37°17′N 31°47′E
- Country: Turkey
- Province: Antalya
- District: Akseki
- Population (2022): 246
- Time zone: UTC+3 (TRT)

Değirmenlik is a neighbourhood in the municipality and district of Akseki, Antalya Province, Turkey. Its population is 246 (2022).
