= Belenalan, Akseki =

Belenalan
- Neighbourhood
- Location in Turkey
- Coordinates: 36.9999°N 31.7711°E
- Country: Turkey
- Province: Antalya
- District: Akseki
- Population (2022): 29
- Time zone: UTC+3 (TRT)

Belenalan is a neighbourhood in the municipality and district of Akseki, Antalya Province, Turkey. Its population is 29 (2022).
