= Hocaköy, Akseki =

Hocaköy
- Neighbourhood
- Location in Turkey
- Coordinates: 36.9083°N 31.6554°E
- Country: Turkey
- Province: Antalya
- District: Akseki
- Population (2022): 216
- Time zone: UTC+3 (TRT)

Hocaköy is a neighbourhood in the municipality and district of Akseki, Antalya Province, Turkey. Its population is 216 (2022).
