= Dizdarlı, Pınarbaşı =

Village in Turkey

Dizdarlı
- Village
- Location in Turkey
- Coordinates: 41°40′11″N 32°55′42″E
- Country: Turkey
- Province: Kastamonu
- District: Pınarbaşı
- Population (2021): 217
- Time zone: UTC+3 (TRT)

Dizdarlı is a village in the Pınarbaşı District of Kastamonu Province in Turkey. Its population is 217 (2021).
