= Kevşirler, Döşemealtı =

Kevşirler
- Neighbourhood
- Location in Turkey
- Coordinates: 37°08′N 30°41′E
- Country: Turkey
- Province: Antalya
- District: Döşemealtı
- Population (2022): 213
- Time zone: UTC+3 (TRT)

Kevşirler is a neighbourhood of the municipality and district of Döşemealtı, Antalya Province, Turkey. As of 2022, the population was 213.
