= Kömürcüler, Döşemealtı =

Kömürcüler
- Neighbourhood
- Location in Turkey
- Coordinates: 37°5′27″N 30°35′55″E
- Country: Turkey
- Province: Antalya
- District: Döşemealtı
- Population (2022): 4,795
- Time zone: UTC+3 (TRT)

Kömürcüler is a neighbourhood of the municipality and district of Döşemealtı, Antalya Province, Turkey. Its population is 4,795 (2022).
