= Serinyaka, Gündoğmuş =

Serinyaka
- Neighbourhood
- Location in Turkey
- Coordinates: 36°48′N 31°49′E
- Country: Turkey
- Province: Antalya
- District: Gündoğmuş
- Population (2022): 145
- Time zone: UTC+3 (TRT)

Serinyaka is a neighbourhood in the municipality and district of Gündoğmuş, Antalya Province, Turkey. Its population is 145 (2022).
