= Ceceler, Akseki =

Ceceler
- Neighbourhood
- Location in Turkey
- Coordinates: 37.1958°N 31.8313°E
- Country: Turkey
- Province: Antalya
- District: Akseki
- Population (2022): 122
- Time zone: UTC+3 (TRT)

Ceceler is a neighbourhood in the municipality and district of Akseki, Antalya Province, Turkey. Its population is 122 (2022).
