= Çukurköy, Akseki =

Çukurköy
- Neighbourhood
- Location in Turkey
- Coordinates: 36.8711°N 31.8436°E
- Country: Turkey
- Province: Antalya
- District: Akseki
- Population (2022): 153
- Time zone: UTC+3 (TRT)

Çukurköy is a neighbourhood in the municipality and district of Akseki, Antalya Province, Turkey. Its population is 153 (2022).
