= Kalecik, Gündoğmuş =

Kalecik
- Neighbourhood
- Location in Turkey
- Coordinates: 36.7864°N 31.8570°E
- Country: Turkey
- Province: Antalya
- District: Gündoğmuş
- Population (2022): 75
- Time zone: UTC+3 (TRT)

Kalecik is a neighbourhood in the municipality and district of Gündoğmuş, Antalya Province, Turkey. Its population is 75 (2022).
