= Keklik Yücel =

Dutch politician and civil servant

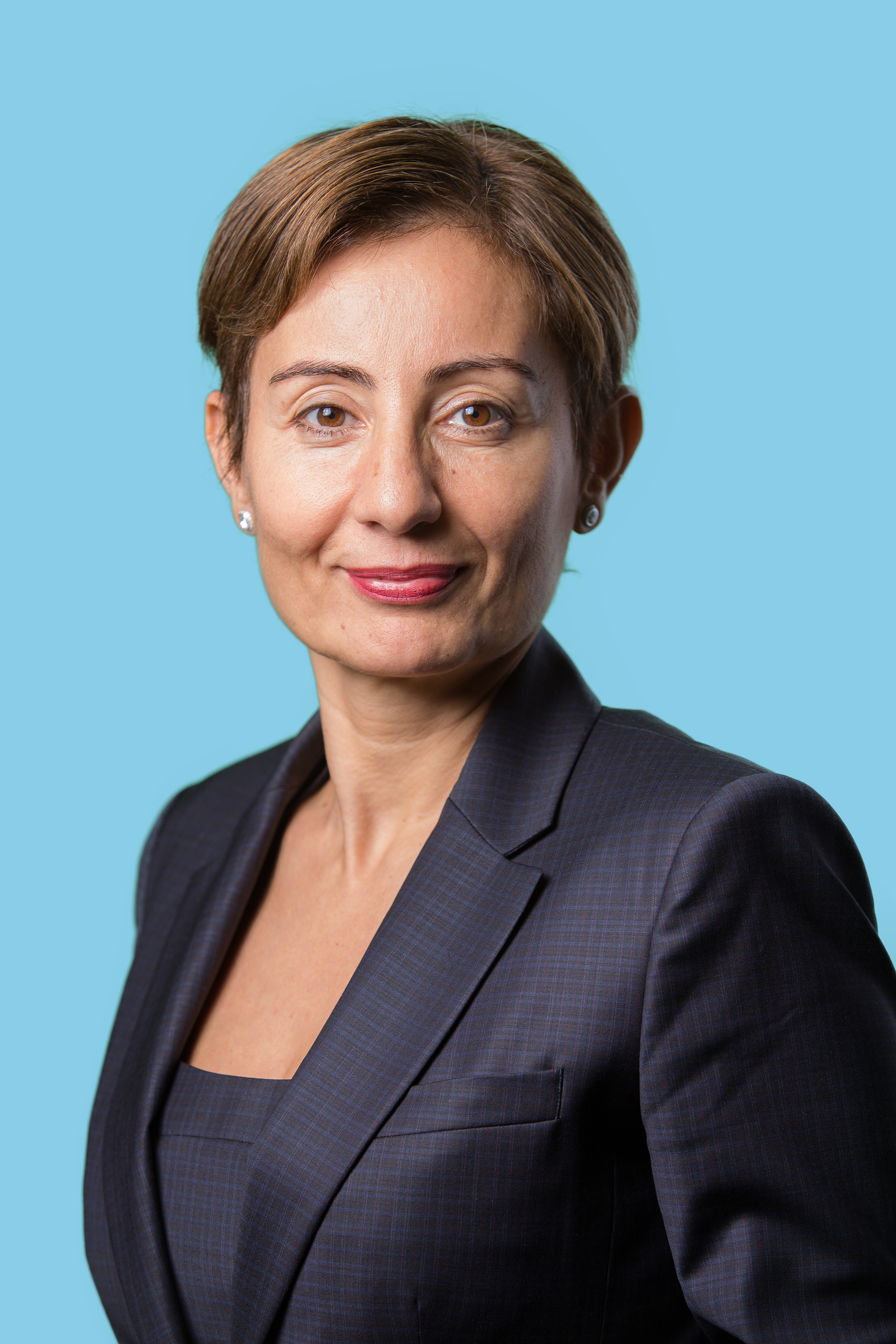
- Keklik Yücel in 2016

Member of the House of Representatives
- In office 20 September 2012 – 23 March 2017
- In office 9 February 2010 – 1 June 2010

Personal details
- Born: 5 May 1968 (age 58) Cevizli, Turkey
- Party: Labour Party
- Education: Vrije Universiteit Amsterdam

Keklik Demir-Yücel (born 5 May 1968) is a Dutch politician of Turkish descent and former civil servant. As a member of the Labour Party (Partij van de Arbeid) she was an MP between 20 September 2012 and 23 March 2017. She focused on matters of emancipation, employment and (international) social work. Previously she was an MP in 2010, replacing Chantal Gill'ard. Till 2010, she worked for the local government in Deventer.

Yücel studied public administration at the Vrije Universiteit Amsterdam.
