= Çayırözü, Gündoğmuş =

Çayırözü
- Neighbourhood
- Location in Turkey
- Coordinates: 36.8089°N 32.0884°E
- Country: Turkey
- Province: Antalya
- District: Gündoğmuş
- Population (2022): 142
- Time zone: UTC+3 (TRT)

Çayırözü is a neighbourhood in the municipality and district of Gündoğmuş, Antalya Province, Turkey. Its population is 142 (2022).
