= Salihler, Akseki =

Salihler
- Neighbourhood
- Location within Turkey
- Coordinates: 37.2342°N 31.7253°E
- Country: Turkey
- Province: Antalya
- District: Akseki
- Population (2022): 145
- Time zone: UTC+3 (TRT)

Salihler is a neighbourhood in the municipality and district of Akseki, Antalya Province, Turkey. Its population is 145 (2022).
