= Urva, Pınarbaşı =

Village in Turkey

Urva
- Village
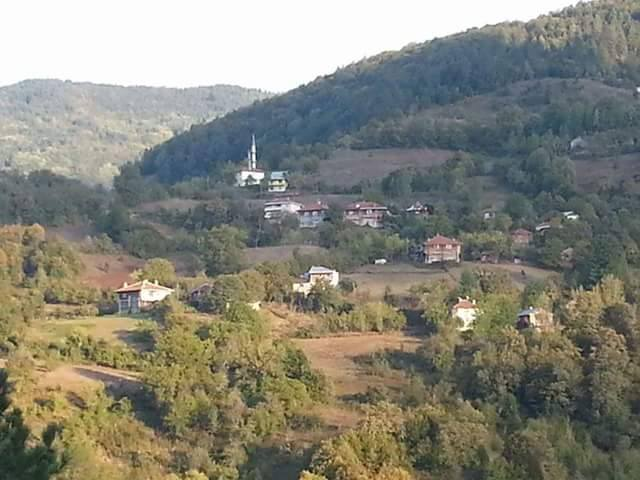
- The village in 2017

- Location within Turkey
- Coordinates: 41°41′20″N 33°02′35″E
- Country: Turkey
- Province: Kastamonu
- District: Pınarbaşı
- Population (2021): 121
- Time zone: UTC+3 (TRT)

Urva is a village in the Pınarbaşı District of Kastamonu Province in Turkey. Its population is 121 (2021).
