= Sadıklar, Akseki =

Sadıklar
- Neighbourhood
- Location in Turkey
- Coordinates: 36.9417°N 31.8009°E
- Country: Turkey
- Province: Antalya
- District: Akseki
- Population (2022): 77
- Time zone: UTC+3 (TRT)

Sadıklar is a neighbourhood in the municipality and district of Akseki, Antalya Province, Turkey. Its population is 77 (2022).
