= Çamlıalan, Gündoğmuş =

Çamlıalan
- Neighbourhood
- Location in Turkey
- Coordinates: 36.7275°N 32.2892°E
- Country: Turkey
- Province: Antalya
- District: Gündoğmuş
- Population (2022): 153
- Time zone: UTC+3 (TRT)

Çamlıalan is a neighbourhood in the municipality and district of Gündoğmuş, Antalya Province, Turkey. Its population is 153 (2022).
