= Hüsamettinköy, Akseki =

Hüsamettinköy
- Neighbourhood
- Location in Turkey
- Coordinates: 37°01′N 31°49′E
- Country: Turkey
- Province: Antalya
- District: Akseki
- Population (2022): 41
- Time zone: UTC+3 (TRT)

Hüsamettinköy is a neighbourhood in the municipality and district of Akseki, Antalya Province, Turkey. Its population is 41 (2022).
