= Menteşbey, Akseki =

Menteşbey
- Neighbourhood
- Location in Turkey
- Coordinates: 37°02′N 31°39′E
- Country: Turkey
- Province: Antalya
- District: Akseki
- Population (2022): 67
- Time zone: UTC+3 (TRT)

Menteşbey is a neighbourhood in the municipality and district of Akseki, Antalya Province, Turkey. Its population is 67 (2022).
