= Seyidlikəndyeri =

Seyidlikendyeri
- Municipality
- Azerbaijani: Seyidlikəndyeri
- Location within Azerbaijan
- Coordinates: 41°43′05″N 48°43′13″E
- Country: Azerbaijan
- District: Khachmaz

Population
  - Total: 1,262
- Time zone: UTC+4 (AZT)
  - Summer (DST): UTC+5 (AZT)

Seyidlikəndyeri (also, Seyidlikendyeri) is a village and municipality in the Khachmaz District of Azerbaijan. It has a population of 1,262. The municipality consists of the villages of Seyidlikendyeri, Aslanoba, Ashaghyoba, Khuray, and Sahiller.
