= Akyar, Gündoğmuş =

Akyar
- Neighbourhood
- Location in Turkey
- Coordinates: 36.7520°N 32.2123°E
- Country: Turkey
- Province: Antalya
- District: Gündoğmuş
- Population (2022): 339
- Time zone: UTC+3 (TRT)

Akyar is a neighbourhood in the municipality and district of Gündoğmuş, Antalya Province, Turkey. Its population is 339 (2022).
