= Güneykaya, Akseki =

Güneykaya
- Neighbourhood
- Location in Turkey
- Coordinates: 36.9067°N 31.6936°E
- Country: Turkey
- Province: Antalya
- District: Akseki
- Population (2022): 284
- Time zone: UTC+3 (TRT)

Güneykaya is a neighbourhood in the municipality and district of Akseki, Antalya Province, Turkey. Its population is 284 (2022).
