= Bıyıklı, Döşemealtı =

Bıyıklı
- Neighbourhood
- Location in Turkey
- Coordinates: 37.1172°N 30.5900°E
- Country: Turkey
- Province: Antalya
- District: Döşemealtı
- Population (2022): 170
- Time zone: UTC+3 (TRT)

Bıyıklı is a neighbourhood of the municipality and district of Döşemealtı, Antalya Province, Turkey. Its population is 170 (2022).
