= Akkoç, Döşemealtı =

Akkoç
- Neighbourhood
- Location in Turkey
- Coordinates: 37.1603°N 30.4613°E
- Country: Turkey
- Province: Antalya
- District: Döşemealtı
- Population (2022): 290
- Time zone: UTC+3 (TRT)

Akkoç is a neighbourhood of the municipality and district of Döşemealtı, Antalya Province, Turkey. Its population is 290 (2022).
