= Eskibağ, Gündoğmuş =

Eskibağ
- Neighbourhood
- Location in Turkey
- Coordinates: 36.7301°N 32.1272°E
- Country: Turkey
- Province: Antalya
- District: Gündoğmuş
- Population (2022): 201
- Time zone: UTC+3 (TRT)

Eskibağ is a neighbourhood in the municipality and district of Gündoğmuş, Antalya Province, Turkey. Its population is 201 (2022).
