= Mahmutlu, Akseki =

Mahmutlu
- Neighbourhood
- Location in Turkey
- Coordinates: 36.9166°N 31.7654°E
- Country: Turkey
- Province: Antalya
- District: Akseki
- Population (2022): 133
- Time zone: UTC+3 (TRT)

Mahmutlu is a neighbourhood in the municipality and district of Akseki, Antalya Province, Turkey. Its population is 133 (2022).
