= Akşahap, Akseki =

Akşahap
- Neighbourhood
- Location in Turkey
- Coordinates: 37°04′N 31°42′E
- Country: Turkey
- Province: Antalya
- District: Akseki
- Population (2022): 100
- Time zone: UTC+3 (TRT)

Akşahap is a neighbourhood in the municipality and district of Akseki, Antalya Province, Turkey. Its population is 100 (2022).

People of this village descend from Teke Turkmens.
