= Sahillər =

Village in the municipality of Seyidlikəndyeri in the Khachmaz Rayon of Azerbaijan

Coordinates: 41°44′N 48°42′E

Sahiller (Azerbaijani: Sahillər) is a village in the municipality of Seyidlikendyeri in the Khachmaz District of Azerbaijan.
