= Bedan, Gündoğmuş =

Bedan
- Neighbourhood
- Location in Turkey
- Coordinates: 36.7744°N 32.2833°E
- Country: Turkey
- Province: Antalya
- District: Gündoğmuş
- Population (2022): 316
- Time zone: UTC+3 (TRT)

Bedan is a neighbourhood in the municipality and district of Gündoğmuş, Antalya Province, Turkey. Its population is 316 (2022).
