= Karaisa, Gündoğmuş =

Karaisa
- Neighbourhood
- Location in Turkey
- Coordinates: 36.8028°N 31.9073°E
- Country: Turkey
- Province: Antalya
- District: Gündoğmuş
- Population (2022): 88
- Time zone: UTC+3 (TRT)

Karaisa is a neighbourhood in the municipality and district of Gündoğmuş, Antalya Province, Turkey. Its population is 88 (2022).
