= Güneyyaka, Gündoğmuş =

Güneyyaka
- Neighbourhood
- Location in Turkey
- Coordinates: 36.8563°N 31.9282°E
- Country: Turkey
- Province: Antalya
- District: Gündoğmuş
- Population (2022): 106
- Time zone: UTC+3 (TRT)

Güneyyaka is a neighbourhood in the municipality and district of Gündoğmuş, Antalya Province, Turkey. Its population is 106 (2022).
