= Akseki =

- District and municipality
- Map showing Akseki District in Antalya Province

- Location within Turkey
- Coordinates: 37°02′55″N 31°47′24″E
- Country: Turkey
- Province: Antalya

Government
  - Mayor: İlkay Akça (CHP)
- Area: 1,544 km^{2} (596 sq mi)
- Elevation: 1,100 m (3,600 ft)
- Population (2022): 10,477
  - Density: 6.786/km^{2} (17.57/sq mi)
- Time zone: UTC+3 (TRT)
- Area code: 0242
- Website: www.akseki.bel.tr

Akseki is a municipality and district of Antalya Province, Turkey. Its area is 1,544 km^{2}, and its population is 10,477 (2022).

Known for its snowdrops, Akseki is located in the western Taurus Mountains at an elevation of 1100m. The Manavgat River passes through a large valley in the centre of the district, which is otherwise mainly mountainous. Places of interest include caves, valleys and a number of high meadows. This windswept rocky mountainside is not good farmland and the local economy mostly depends on forestry and raising sheep and cattle. Many people from Akseki have migrated to Antalya but still have homes here as an escape from the summer heat on the coast.

Akseki was formerly Byzantine town of Marla, Marulya, or Marulia. It was conquered by the Seljuk Turks and the Ottoman Empire along with other towns in the area.

Antalya's Akdeniz University has a branch here training nurses, and doing some other vocational training.

With its architectural heritage, Akseki is a member of the Norwich-based European Association of Historic Towns and Regions.

The country boasts an economy based on cattle and almond trade.

== Composition ==
There are 51 neighbourhoods in Akseki District:

- Akşahap
- Alaçeşme
- Aşağıaşıklar
- Bademli
- Belenalan
- Boğaz
- Bucakalan
- Bucakkışla
- Büyükalan
- Çaltılıçukur
- Çanakpınar
- Ceceler
- Cemerler
- Cendeve
- Cevizli
- Çimiköy
- Çınardibi
- Çukurköy
- Değirmenlik
- Demirciler
- Dikmen
- Dutluca
- Emiraşıklar
- Erenyaka
- Fakılar
- Geriş
- Güçlüköy
- Gümüşdamla
- Güneykaya
- Günyaka
- Güzelsu
- Hacıilyas
- Hocaköy
- Hüsamettinköy
- Karakışla
- Kepez
- Kepezbeleni
- Kuyucak
- Mahmutlu
- Menteşbey
- Minareli
- Pınarbaşı
- Sadıklar
- Salihler
- Sarıhacılar
- Sarıhaliller
- Sinanhoca
- Süleymaniye
- Susuzşahap
- Taşlıca
- Yarpuz

== Notable residents ==
- Fatin Gökmen (1877–1955), astronomer and politician
- Keklik Yücel (born 1968), Dutch politician
