= Umutlu, Gündoğmuş =

Umutlu
- Neighbourhood
- Location in Turkey
- Coordinates: 36.7788°N 32.0082°E
- Country: Turkey
- Province: Antalya
- District: Gündoğmuş
- Population (2022): 453
- Time zone: UTC+3 (TRT)

Umutlu is a neighbourhood in the municipality and district of Gündoğmuş, Antalya Province, Turkey. Its population is 453 (2022).
