= Balkaya, Gündoğmuş =

Balkaya
- Neighbourhood
- Location in Turkey
- Coordinates: 36.7532°N 32.0872°E
- Country: Turkey
- Province: Antalya
- District: Gündoğmuş
- Population (2022): 346
- Time zone: UTC+3 (TRT)

Balkaya is a neighbourhood in the municipality and district of Gündoğmuş, Antalya Province, Turkey. Its population is 346 (2022).
