= Karataş, Döşemealtı =

Karataş
- Neighbourhood
- Location in Turkey
- Coordinates: 37°8′23″N 30°37′34″E
- Country: Turkey
- Province: Antalya
- District: Döşemealtı
- Population (2022): 1,005
- Time zone: UTC+3 (TRT)

Karataş is a neighbourhood of the municipality and district of Döşemealtı, Antalya Province, Turkey. Its population is 1,005 (2022).
