= Güzelsu, Akseki =

Güzelsu
- Neighbourhood
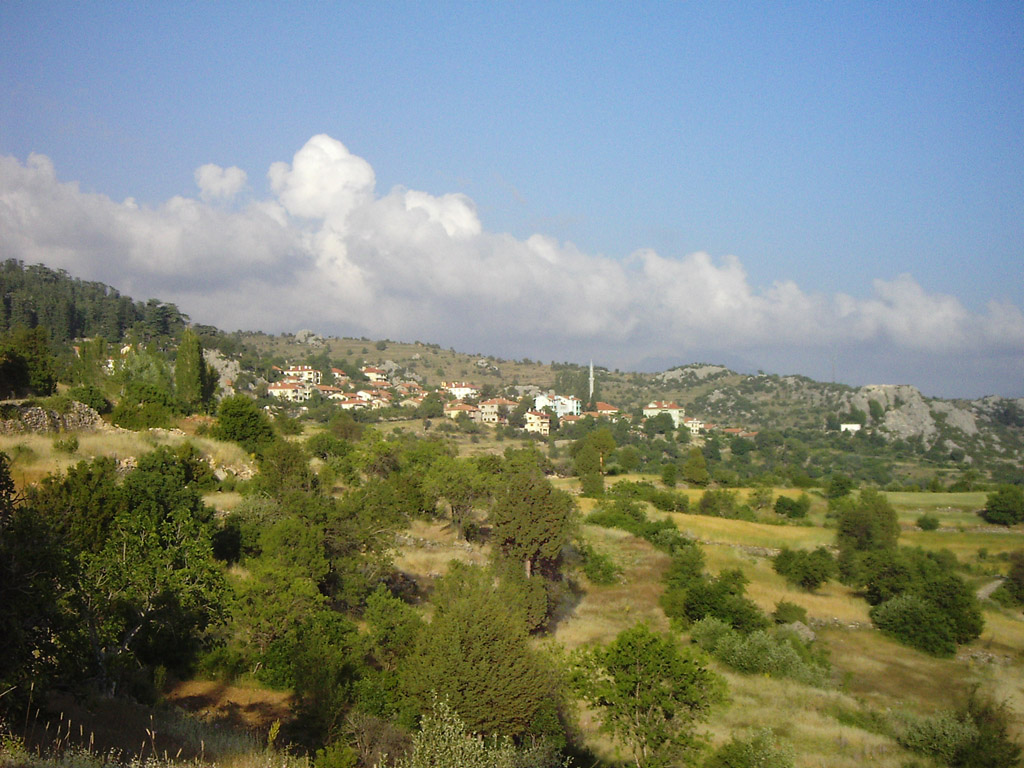

- Location within Turkey
- Coordinates: 36°53′47″N 31°51′20″E
- Country: Turkey
- Province: Antalya
- District: Akseki
- Population (2022): 106
- Time zone: UTC+3 (TRT)

Güzelsu is a neighbourhood in the municipality and district of Akseki, Antalya Province, Turkey. Its population is 106 (2022).
