= Kovanlık, Döşemealtı =

Kovanlık
- Neighbourhood
- Country: Turkey
- Province: Antalya
- District: Döşemealtı
- Population (2022): 1,321
- Time zone: UTC+3 (TRT)

Kovanlık is a neighbourhood of the municipality and district of Döşemealtı, Antalya Province, Turkey. Its population is 1,321 (2022).
