= Kozağacı, Gündoğmuş =

Kozağacı
- Neighbourhood
- Country: Turkey
- Province: Antalya
- District: Gündoğmuş
- Population (2022): 99
- Time zone: UTC+3 (TRT)

Kozağacı is a neighbourhood in the municipality and district of Gündoğmuş, Antalya Province, Turkey. Its population is 99 (2022).
