= Çaltı, Gündoğmuş =

Çaltı
- Neighbourhood
- Location in Turkey
- Coordinates: 36.7167°N 32.1667°E
- Country: Turkey
- Province: Antalya
- District: Gündoğmuş
- Population (2022): 209
- Time zone: UTC+3 (TRT)

Çaltı is a neighbourhood in the municipality and district of Gündoğmuş, Antalya Province, Turkey. Its population is 209 (2022).
