= Dikmen, Akseki =

Dikmen
- Neighbourhood
- Location in Turkey
- Coordinates: 36.9694°N 31.7814°E
- Country: Turkey
- Province: Antalya
- District: Akseki
- Population (2022): 68
- Time zone: UTC+3 (TRT)

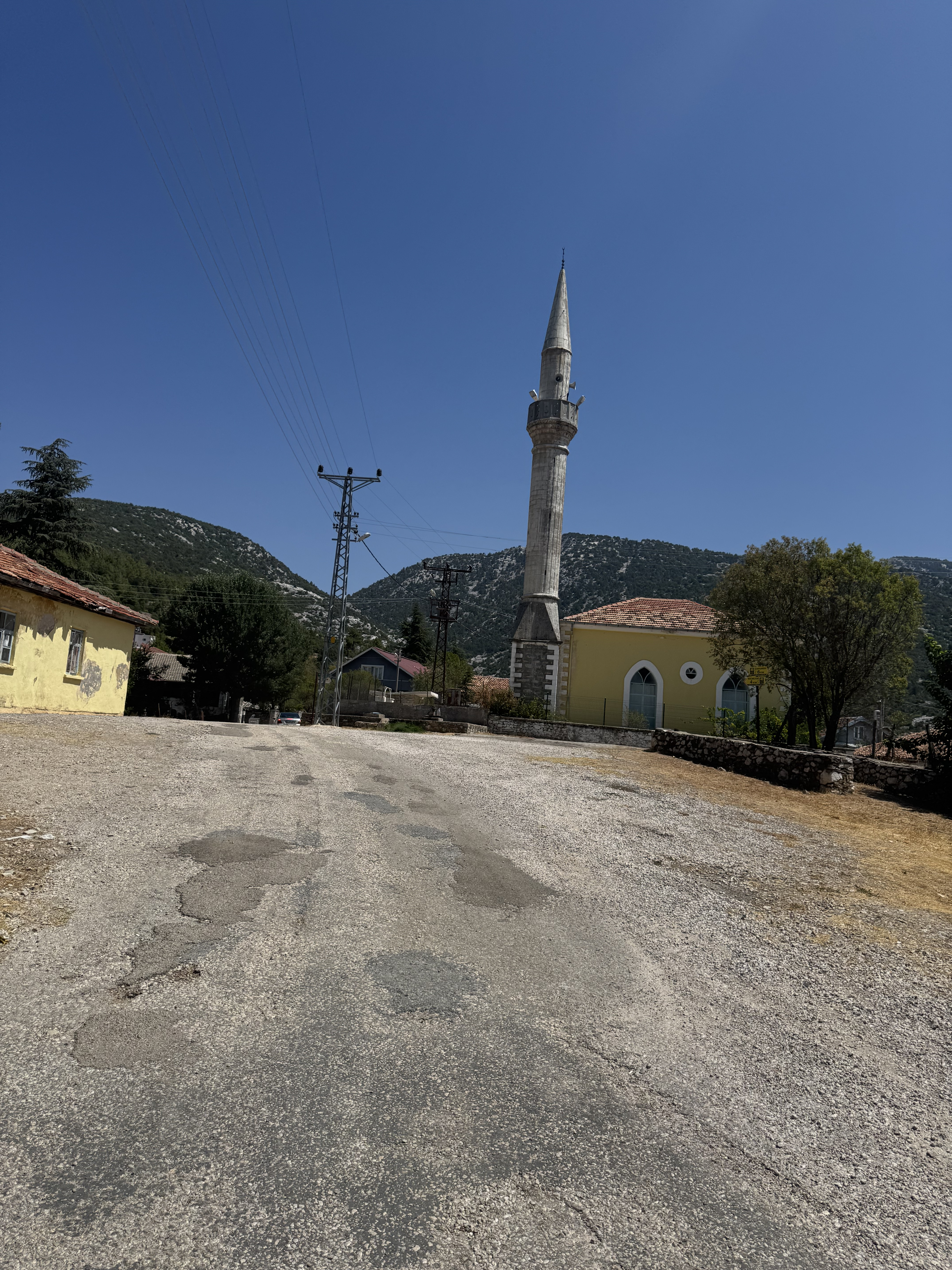
A view from the neighborhood.

Dikmen is a neighbourhood in the municipality and district of Akseki, Antalya Province, Turkey. Its population is 68 (2022).
