= Karakışla, Akseki =

Karakışla
- Neighbourhood
- Location in Turkey
- Coordinates: 37.1725°N 31.8550°E
- Country: Turkey
- Province: Antalya
- District: Akseki
- Population (2022): 156
- Time zone: UTC+3 (TRT)

Karakışla is a neighbourhood in the municipality and district of Akseki, Antalya Province, Turkey. Its population is 156 (2022).
