= Aslanoba =

- Location within Azerbaijan
- Coordinates: 41°43′N 48°43′E
- Country: Azerbaijan
- Rayon: Khachmaz
- Municipality: Seyidlikəndyeri
- Time zone: UTC+4 (AZT)
  - Summer (DST): UTC+5 (AZT)

Aslanoba (also, Aslanoba-Seidlyar) is a village in the Khachmaz Rayon of Azerbaijan. The village forms part of the municipality of Seyidlikəndyeri.
