= Başköy, Pınarbaşı =

Village in Turkey

Başköy
- Village
- Location in Turkey
- Coordinates: 41.610°N 32.975°E
- Country: Turkey
- Province: Kastamonu
- District: Pınarbaşı
- Population (2021): 101
- Time zone: UTC+3 (TRT)

Başköy is a village in the Pınarbaşı District of Kastamonu Province in Turkey. Its population is 101 (2021).
