= Kepez, Akseki =

Kepez
- Neighbourhood
- Location in Turkey
- Coordinates: 36°55′22″N 31°37′00″E
- Country: Turkey
- Province: Antalya
- District: Akseki
- Population (2022): 250
- Time zone: UTC+3 (TRT)

Kepez is a neighbourhood in the municipality and district of Akseki, Antalya Province, Turkey. Its population is 250 (2022).
