= Çınardibi, Akseki =

Çınardibi
- Neighbourhood
- Location in Turkey
- Coordinates: 37°10′37″N 31°42′40″E
- Country: Turkey
- Province: Antalya
- District: Akseki
- Population (2022): 64
- Time zone: UTC+3 (TRT)

Çınardibi is a neighbourhood in the municipality and district of Akseki, Antalya Province, Turkey. Its population is 64 (2022).
