= Emiraşıklar, Akseki =

Emiraşıklar
- Neighbourhood
- Location in Turkey
- Coordinates: 37°02′N 31°44′E
- Country: Turkey
- Province: Antalya
- District: Akseki
- Population (2022): 48
- Time zone: UTC+3 (TRT)

Emiraşıklar is a neighbourhood in the municipality and district of Akseki, Antalya Province, Turkey. Its population is 48 (2022).
