= Kurtlugelik, Pınarbaşı =

Village in Turkey

Kurtlugelik
- Village
- Location in Turkey
- Coordinates: 41.557°N 33.111°E
- Country: Turkey
- Province: Kastamonu
- District: Pınarbaşı
- Population (2021): 73
- Time zone: UTC+3 (TRT)

Kurtlugelik is a village in the Pınarbaşı District of Kastamonu Province in Turkey. Its population is 73 (2021).
