= Gündoğmuş =

- District and municipality
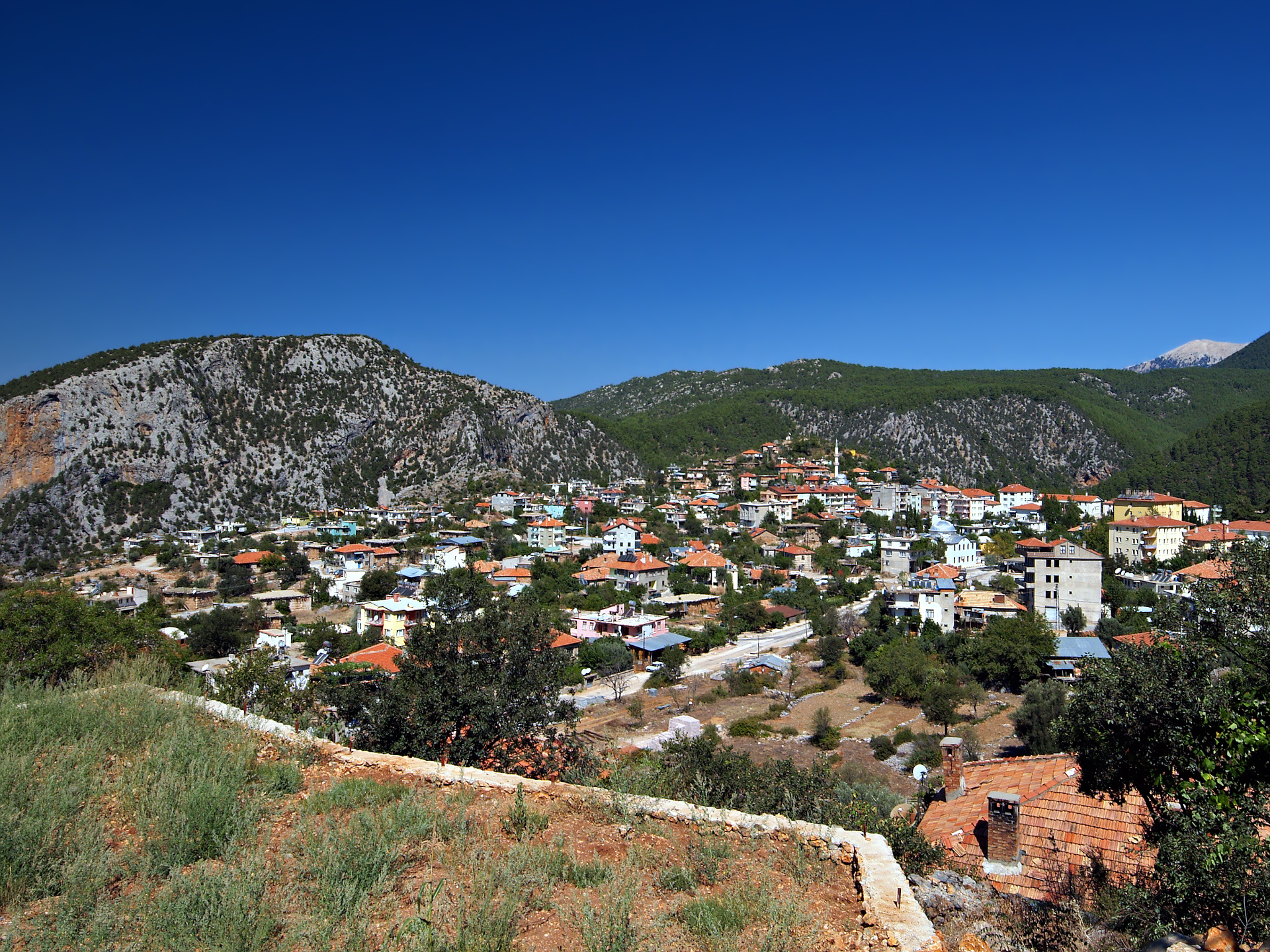

- Map showing Gündoğmuş District in Antalya Province

- Location within Turkey
- Coordinates: 36°48′44″N 31°59′57″E
- Country: Turkey
- Province: Antalya

Government
  - Mayor: Ali Gülen (AKP)
- Area: 1,175 km^{2} (454 sq mi)
- Elevation: 900 m (3,000 ft)
- Population (2022): 7,188
  - Density: 6.117/km^{2} (15.84/sq mi)
- Time zone: UTC+3 (TRT)
- Area code: 0242
- Website: www.gundogmus.bel.tr

Gündoğmuş (Turkish: [ˈɟyndoːmuʃ]) is a municipality and district of Antalya Province, Turkey. Its area is 1,175 km^{2}, and its population is 7,188 (2022). It is 182 km from the city of Antalya, off the road from Akseki to Manavgat.

The town was previously a village named Eksere in the district of Akseki and was renamed Gündoğmuş in 1936.

== Geography ==
Gündoğmuş stands in the foothills of the mountain Geyik Dağı, in the western Taurus Mountains. The mountainside is forested and the districted is split by the Alara River. The district has a warm Mediterranean climate with coolish winters due to the altitude.

Today this is an impoverished rural district as the nearby Mediterranean coast has drawn away successive generations in search of jobs in the tourist industry. The local economy depends on forestry, and money earned from seasonal jobs picking cotton or working in tourism in other parts of Turkey. There is no industry and little agriculture on this steep hillside, although grazing animals and beekeeping are important sources of income. Parts of the hillside are terraced for planting, but this is mainly vegetables for use at home.

Gündoğmuş is a small town with a high school and a boarding school for children from the most remote villages.

== History ==
This area has been occupied since antiquity, and the site of the modern town of Gündoğmuş was settled by the ancient Romans. There were forest fires in 2021.

== Composition ==
There are 29 neighbourhoods in Gündoğmuş District:

- Akyar
- Balkaya
- Bedan
- Çaltı
- Çamlıalan
- Çayırözü
- Çiçekoluk
- Eskibağ
- Fatih
- Güneycik
- Güneyyaka
- Kalecik
- Karabul
- Karadere
- Karaisa
- Karaköy
- Kayabükü
- Köprülü
- Kozağacı
- Narağacı
- Ortakonuş
- Ortaköy
- Özügür
- Pembelik
- Rasih Kaplan
- Senir
- Serinyaka
- Umutlu
- Yeniköy

== Places of interest ==
Antique sites in the district include the town of Kazayir (near Taşahır on the main road to Antalya); the ruins of Kese near the village of Senir; the ruins of Gedfi 11 km south of the town of Gündoğmuş; the ruins on Sinek Mountain, 15 km (9 mi) east of Gundogmus, near the village of Pembelik; and many more.

The town of Gündoğmuş itself has an Ottoman Empire period mosque dedicated to Cem Sultan, an Ottoman prince who was at one time governor of this area.

The area provides many opportunities for climbing, mountain walking and picnics in the forest.
