= Pembelik, Gündoğmuş =

Pembelik
- Neighbourhood
- Location in Turkey
- Coordinates: 36°50′N 32°05′E
- Country: Turkey
- Province: Antalya
- District: Gündoğmuş
- Population (2022): 118
- Time zone: UTC+3 (TRT)

Pembelik is a neighbourhood in the municipality and district of Gündoğmuş, Antalya Province, Turkey. Its population is 118 (2022).
