= Susuzşahap, Akseki =

Susuzşahap
- Neighbourhood
- Location in Turkey
- Coordinates: 37°14′N 31°48′E
- Country: Turkey
- Province: Antalya
- District: Akseki
- Population (2022): 118
- Time zone: UTC+3 (TRT)

Susuzşahap is a neighbourhood in the municipality and district of Akseki, Antalya Province, Turkey. Its population is 118 (2022).
