= Karadere, Gündoğmuş =

Karadere
- Neighbourhood
- Location in Turkey
- Coordinates: 36.8377°N 31.9400°E
- Country: Turkey
- Province: Antalya
- District: Gündoğmuş
- Population (2022): 152
- Time zone: UTC+3 (TRT)

Karadere is a neighbourhood in the municipality and district of Gündoğmuş, Antalya Province, Turkey. Its population is 152 (2022).
