= Çavuşköy, Pınarbaşı =

Çavuşköy
- Village
- Location within Turkey
- Country: Turkey
- Province: Kastamonu
- District: Pınarbaşı
- Population (2022): 92
- Time zone: UTC+3 (TRT)

Çavuşköy is a village in the Pınarbaşı District of the Kastamonu Province in Turkey. Its population is 92 (2022).
