= Ortakonuş, Gündoğmuş =

Ortakonuş
- Neighbourhood
- Location in Turkey
- Coordinates: 36°45′N 32°03′E
- Country: Turkey
- Province: Antalya
- District: Gündoğmuş
- Population (2022): 205
- Time zone: UTC+3 (TRT)

Ortakonuş is a neighbourhood in the municipality and district of Gündoğmuş, Antalya Province, Turkey. Its population is 205 (2022).
