= Camili, Döşemealtı =

Camili
- Neighbourhood
- Location in Turkey
- Coordinates: 37°10′57″N 30°39′42″E
- Country: Turkey
- Province: Antalya
- District: Döşemealtı
- Population (2022): 420
- Time zone: UTC+3 (TRT)

Camili is a neighbourhood of the municipality and district of Döşemealtı, Antalya Province, Turkey. Its population is 420 (2022).
