= Gümüşdamla, Akseki =

Gümüşdamla
- Neighbourhood
- Location in Turkey
- Coordinates: 37°11′11″N 31°41′05″E
- Country: Turkey
- Province: Antalya
- District: Akseki
- Population (2022): 236
- Time zone: UTC+3 (TRT)

Gümüşdamla is a neighbourhood in the municipality and district of Akseki, Antalya Province, Turkey. Its population is 236 (2022).
