= Yeniköy, Gündoğmuş =

Yeniköy
- Neighbourhood
- Location in Turkey
- Coordinates: 36.7167°N 32.2667°E
- Country: Turkey
- Province: Antalya
- District: Gündoğmuş
- Population (2022): 65
- Time zone: UTC+3 (TRT)

Yeniköy is a neighbourhood in the municipality and district of Gündoğmuş, Antalya Province, Turkey. Its population is 65 (2022).
