= Erenyaka, Akseki =

Erenyaka
- Neighbourhood
- Location in Turkey
- Coordinates: 36°55′45″N 31°44′58″E
- Country: Turkey
- Province: Antalya
- District: Akseki
- Population (2022): 92
- Time zone: UTC+3 (TRT)

Erenyaka is a neighbourhood in the municipality and district of Akseki, Antalya Province, Turkey. Its population is 92 (2022).
