= Minareli =

- Neighbourhood
- Location in Turkey
- Coordinates: 37°01′N 31°41′E
- Country: Turkey
- Province: Antalya
- District: Akseki
- Population (2022): 25
- Time zone: UTC+3 (TRT)

Minareli is a neighbourhood in the municipality and district of Akseki, Antalya Province, Turkey. Its population is 25 (2022).
