= Kepezbeleni, Akseki =

Kepezbeleni
- Neighbourhood
- Location in Turkey
- Coordinates: 36°54′N 31°36′E
- Country: Turkey
- Province: Antalya
- District: Akseki
- Population (2022): 95
- Time zone: UTC+3 (TRT)

Kepezbeleni is a neighbourhood in the municipality and district of Akseki, Antalya Province, Turkey. Its population is 95 (2022).
