= Uzla, Pınarbaşı =

Village in Turkey

Uzla
- Village
- Location within Turkey
- Coordinates: 41°42′N 32°59′E
- Country: Turkey
- Province: Kastamonu
- District: Pınarbaşı
- Population (2022): 117
- Time zone: UTC+3 (TRT)

Uzla is a village in Pınarbaşı District of Kastamonu Province, Turkey. Its population is 117 (2022). Its distance to Kastamonu is 126 km (78 mi) and to Pınarbaşı is 29 km (18 mi).

== Population ==
Historical population
Year	Pop.	±% p.a.
1990	296	—
1997	184	−6.57%
2007	155	−1.70%
2012	160	+0.64%
2017	132	−3.77%
2022	117	−2.38%
Source: Population censuses (1990-1997) and TÜIK (2007-2022)
