= Yamanlar, Pınarbaşı =

Village in Turkey

Yamanlar
- Village
- Location in Turkey
- Coordinates: 41.707°N 32.996°E
- Country: Turkey
- Province: Kastamonu
- District: Pınarbaşı
- Population (2021): 213
- Time zone: UTC+3 (TRT)

Yamanlar is a village in the Pınarbaşı District of Kastamonu Province in Turkey. Its population is 213 (2021).
