= Çiçekoluk, Gündoğmuş =

Çiçekoluk
- Neighbourhood
- Location in Turkey
- Coordinates: 36°49′N 31°51′E
- Country: Turkey
- Province: Antalya
- District: Gündoğmuş
- Population (2022): 158
- Time zone: UTC+3 (TRT)

Çiçekoluk is a neighbourhood in the municipality and district of Gündoğmuş, Antalya Province, Turkey. Its population is 158 (2022).
