= Sümenler, Pınarbaşı =

Sümenler
- Village
- Country: Turkey
- Province: Kastamonu
- District: Pınarbaşı
- Population (2021): 225
- Time zone: UTC+3 (TRT)

Sümenler is a village in the Pınarbaşı District, Kastamonu Province, Turkey. Its population is 225 (2021).

== Geography ==
It is 127 km from Kastamonu city and 31 km from Pınarbaşı town.

== Economy ==
The economy of the village is based on forest products, agriculture and animal husbandry.
