= Kayabükü, Gündoğmuş =

Kayabükü
- Neighbourhood
- Location in Turkey
- Coordinates: 36.7620°N 32.1485°E
- Country: Turkey
- Province: Antalya
- District: Gündoğmuş
- Population (2022): 274
- Time zone: UTC+3 (TRT)

Kayabükü is a neighbourhood in the municipality and district of Gündoğmuş, Antalya Province, Turkey. Its population is 274 (2022).
