= Döşemealtı =

- District and municipality
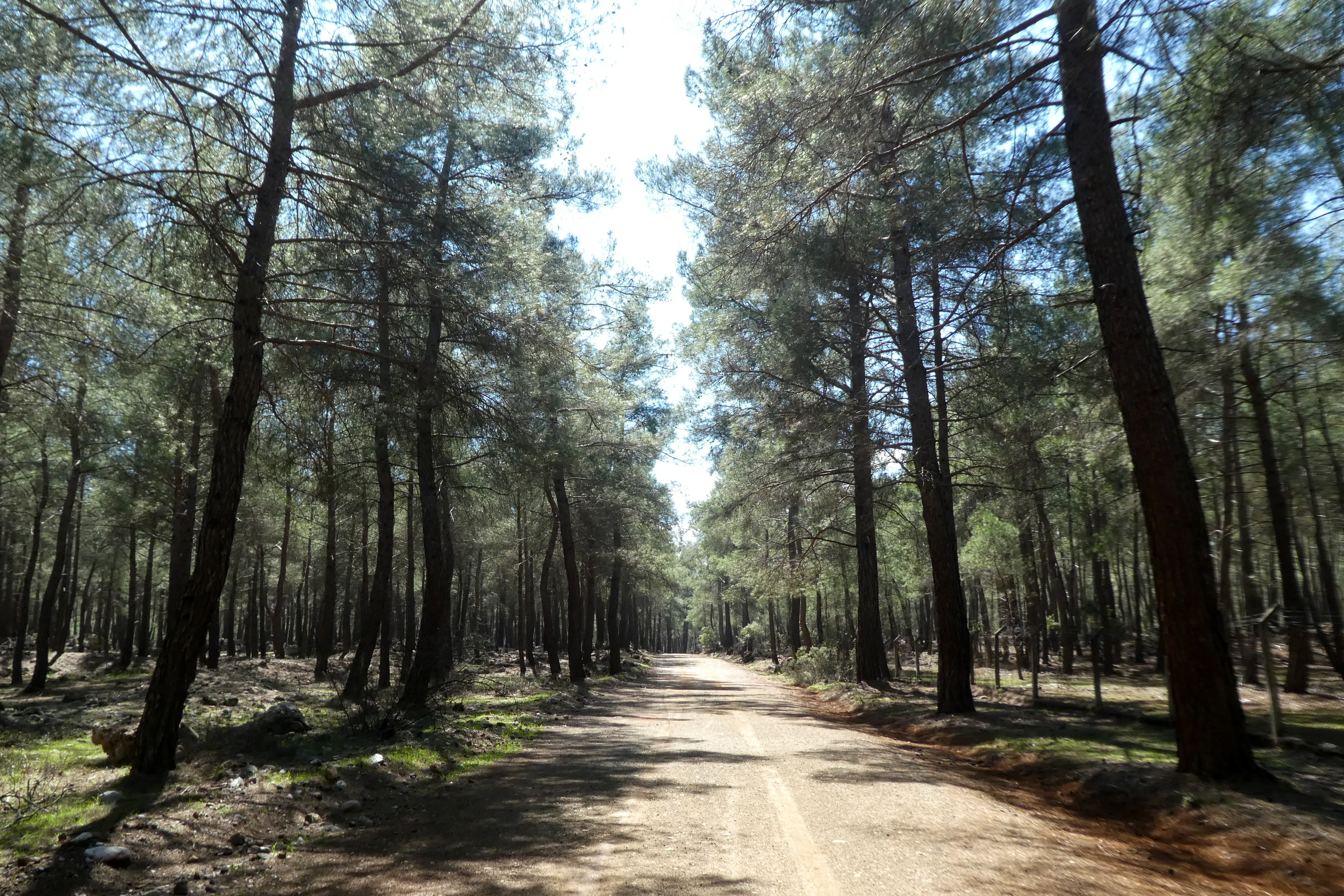
- Güver Canyon Nature Park

- Map showing Döşemealtı District in Antalya Province

- Location within Turkey
- Coordinates: 37°01′25″N 30°36′04″E
- Country: Turkey
- Province: Antalya

Government
  - Mayor: Menderes Dal (CHP)
- Area: 687 km^{2} (265 sq mi)
- Population (2022): 79,495
  - Density: 116/km^{2} (300/sq mi)
- Time zone: UTC+3 (TRT)
- Area code: 0242
- Website: www.dosemealti.bel.tr

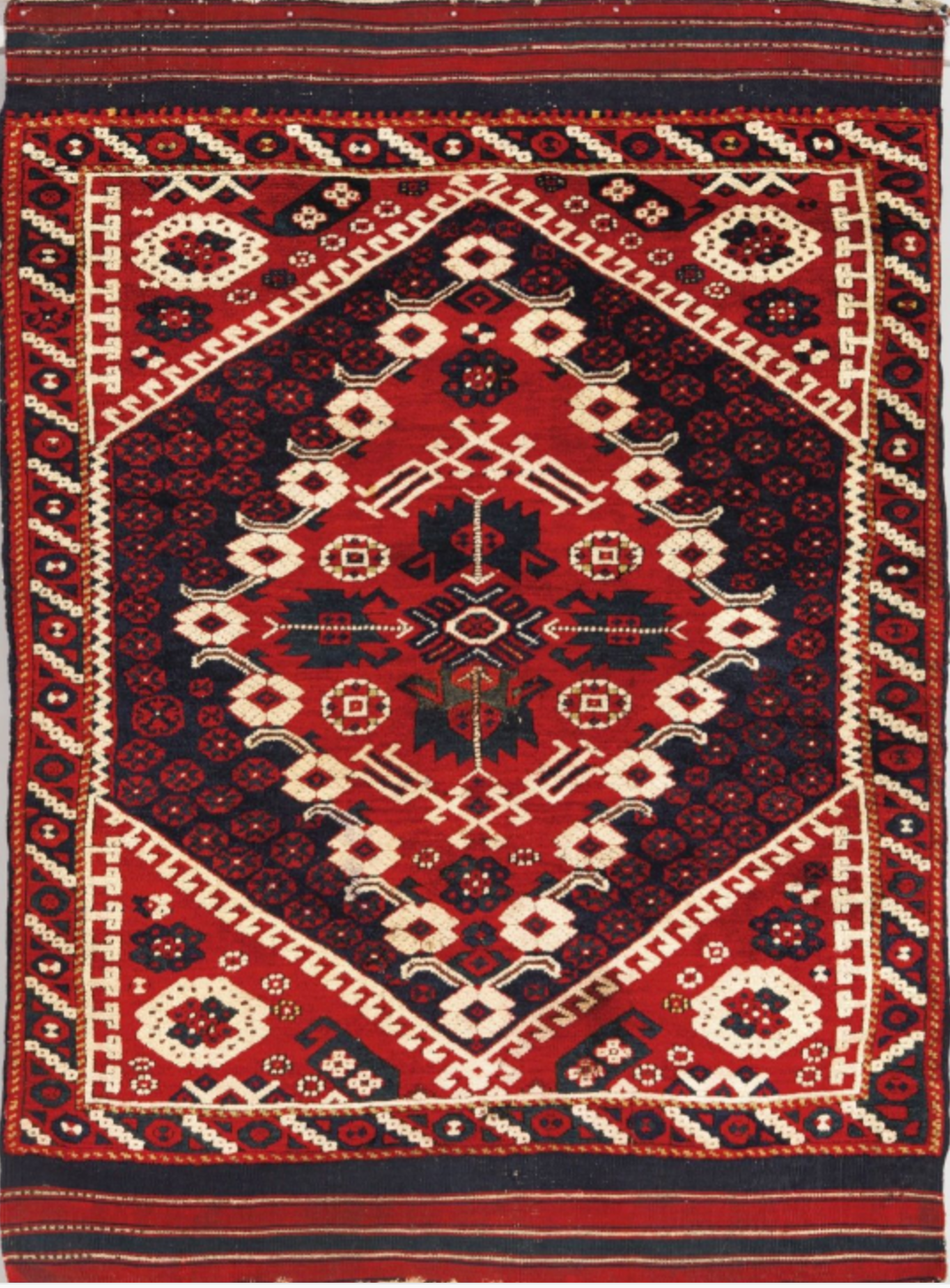
Döşemealti rug, 19th century

Döşemealtı is a municipality and district of Antalya Province, Turkey. Its area is 687 km^{2}, and its population is 79,495 (2022). Döşemealtı is situated 20 kilometres (12 mi) north of Antalya city center on the Turkish state highway D.650. The name of the city refers to an ancient road around the town (In Turkish Döşeme means "pavement" ) Döşemealtı is a recent settlement. The earliest residents were from Korkuteli (Burdur Province) in 1934. Later people from Cyprus and Yörüks (nomadic Turkmens) were also settled in Döşemealtı. It was declared as seat of township in 1972 and a district center within Greater Antalya in 1998.

== Composition ==
There are 32 neighbourhoods in Döşemealtı District:

- Ahırtaş
- Akkoç
- Altınkale
- Aşağıoba
- Ayanlar
- Aydınlar
- Bademağacı
- Bahçeyaka
- Bıyıklı
- Camili
- Çığlık
- Çıplaklı
- Dağbeli
- Dereli
- Düzlerçamı
- Ekşili
- Ilıcaköy
- Karaman
- Karataş
- Karaveliler
- Kevşirler
- Killik
- Kömürcüler
- Kovanlık
- Nebiler
- Orta
- Selimiye
- Tomalar
- Yağca
- Yalınlı
- Yeniköy
- Yeşilbayır
