= Kayabükü, Pınarbaşı =

Village in Turkey

Kayabükü
- Village
- Location in Turkey
- Coordinates: 41.615°N 33.030°E
- Country: Turkey
- Province: Kastamonu
- District: Pınarbaşı
- Population (2021): 124
- Time zone: UTC+3 (TRT)

Kayabükü is a village in the Pınarbaşı District of Kastamonu Province in Turkey. Its population is 124 (2021).
