= Pınarbaşı, Akseki =

Pınarbaşı
- Neighbourhood
- Location in Turkey
- Coordinates: 36.9016°N 31.8672°E
- Country: Turkey
- Province: Antalya
- District: Akseki
- Population (2022): 146
- Time zone: UTC+3 (TRT)

Pınarbaşı is a neighbourhood in the municipality and district of Akseki, Antalya Province, Turkey. Its population is 146 (2022).
