= Bademağacı =

- Neighbourhood
- Location in Turkey
- Coordinates: 37°13′23″N 30°29′53″E
- Country: Turkey
- Province: Antalya
- District: Döşemealtı
- Population (2022): 1,250
- Time zone: UTC+3 (TRT)

Bademağacı is a neighbourhood of the municipality and district of Döşemealtı, Antalya Province, Turkey. Its population is 1,250 (2022). Before the 2013 reorganisation, it was a town (belde). It is north of Antalya, near the Antalya-Burdur main road. It is 50 km from Antalya centre and 4 km from Cubukbeli.

== Archeological sites ==
Bademağacı is an important archeological area. A group of archeologists from Istanbul University have made archeological explorations.
