= Aşağıoba, Khachmaz =

Ashaghyoba
- Azerbaijani: Aşağıoba
- Location within Azerbaijan
- Coordinates: 41°43′06″N 48°44′03″E
- Country: Azerbaijan
- District: Khachmaz
- Municipality: Seyidlikendyeri
- Time zone: UTC+4 (AZT)
  - Summer (DST): UTC+5 (AZT)

Aşağıoba (also, Ashaghyoba) is a village in the Khachmaz District of Azerbaijan. The village forms part of the municipality of Seyidlikendyeri.
