= Kuyucak, Akseki =

Kuyucak
- Neighbourhood
- Location in Turkey
- Coordinates: 37°13′27″N 31°38′16″E
- Country: Turkey
- Province: Antalya
- District: Akseki
- Population (2022): 392
- Time zone: UTC+3 (TRT)

Kuyucak (formerly: İlarma) is a neighbourhood in the municipality and district of Akseki, Antalya Province, Turkey. Its population is 392 (2022). Before the 2013 reorganisation, it was a town (belde).
