= Yarpuz, Akseki =

Yarpuz
- Neighbourhood
- Location in Turkey
- Coordinates: 37.1292°N 31.8575°E
- Country: Turkey
- Province: Antalya
- District: Akseki
- Population (2022): 234
- Time zone: UTC+3 (TRT)

Yarpuz is a neighbourhood in the municipality and district of Akseki, Antalya Province, Turkey. Its population is 234 (2022). Before the 2013 reorganisation, it was a town (belde).
