= Çanakpınar, Akseki =

Çanakpınar
- Neighbourhood
- Location in Turkey
- Coordinates: 36.9981°N 31.8213°E
- Country: Turkey
- Province: Antalya
- District: Akseki
- Population (2022): 40
- Time zone: UTC+3 (TRT)

Çanakpınar is a neighbourhood in the municipality and district of Akseki, Antalya Province, Turkey. Its population is 40 (2022).
