= Aşağıoba, Döşemealtı =

Aşağıoba
- Neighbourhood
- Location in Turkey
- Coordinates: 37.1155°N 30.6373°E
- Country: Turkey
- Province: Antalya
- District: Döşemealtı
- Population (2022): 388
- Time zone: UTC+3 (TRT)

Aşağıoba is a neighbourhood of the municipality and district of Döşemealtı, Antalya Province, Turkey. Its population is 388 (2022).
