= Güçlüköy, Akseki =

Güçlüköy
- Neighbourhood
- Location in Turkey
- Coordinates: 36°49′N 31°45′E
- Country: Turkey
- Province: Antalya
- District: Akseki
- Population (2022): 533
- Time zone: UTC+3 (TRT)

Güçlüköy is a neighbourhood in the municipality and district of Akseki, Antalya Province, Turkey. Its population is 533 (2022), but before the 2013 reorganisation, it was a town (belde).
