= Pınarbaşı District, Kastamonu =

District of Kastamonu Province, Turkey

Pınarbaşı District
- District
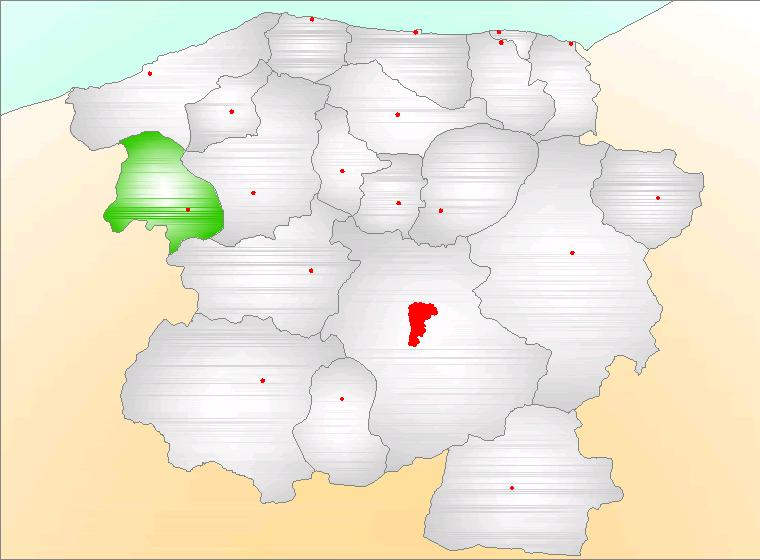
- Map showing Pınarbaşı District (green) in Kastamonu Province

- Location in Turkey
- Coordinates: 41°36′N 33°07′E
- Country: Turkey
- Province: Kastamonu
- Seat: Pınarbaşı

Government
  - Kaymakam: Serkan Tokur
- Area: 546 km^{2} (211 sq mi)
- Population (2021): 5,688
  - Density: 10/km^{2} (27/sq mi)
- Time zone: UTC+3 (TRT)
- Website: www.pinarbasi.gov.tr

Pınarbaşı District is a district of the Kastamonu Province of Turkey. Its seat is the town of Pınarbaşı. Its area is 546 km^{2}, and its population is 5,688 (2021).

== Composition ==
There is one municipality in Pınarbaşı District:

- Pınarbaşı

There are 27 villages in Pınarbaşı District:

- Aşağıaktaş
- Başköy
- Boğazkaya
- Çavuşköy
- Çengel
- Demirtaş
- Dizdarlı
- Esentepe
- Gümberi
- Hocalar
- Ilıca
- Kalaycı
- Kapancı
- Karacaören
- Karafasıl
- Kayabükü
- Kerte
- Kurtlugelik
- Mirahor
- Muratbaşı
- Savaş
- Sümenler
- Urva
- Uzla
- Üyükören
- Yamanlar
- Yukarıaktaş
