= Pınarbaşı, Kastamonu =

Pınarbaşı
- Municipality
- Location within Turkey
- Coordinates: 41°36′14″N 33°06′33″E
- Country: Turkey
- Province: Kastamonu
- District: Pınarbaşı

Government
  - Mayor: Şenol Yaşar (AKP)
- Elevation: 680 m (2,230 ft)
- Population (2021): 2,477
- Time zone: UTC+3 (TRT)
- Area code: 0366
- Climate: Cfb
- Website: www.pinarbasibelediyesi.bel.tr

Pınarbaşı, formerly Tekkeşin, is a town in the Kastamonu Province in the Black Sea region of Turkey. It is the seat of Pınarbaşı District. Its population is 2,477 (2021).

== Image gallery ==
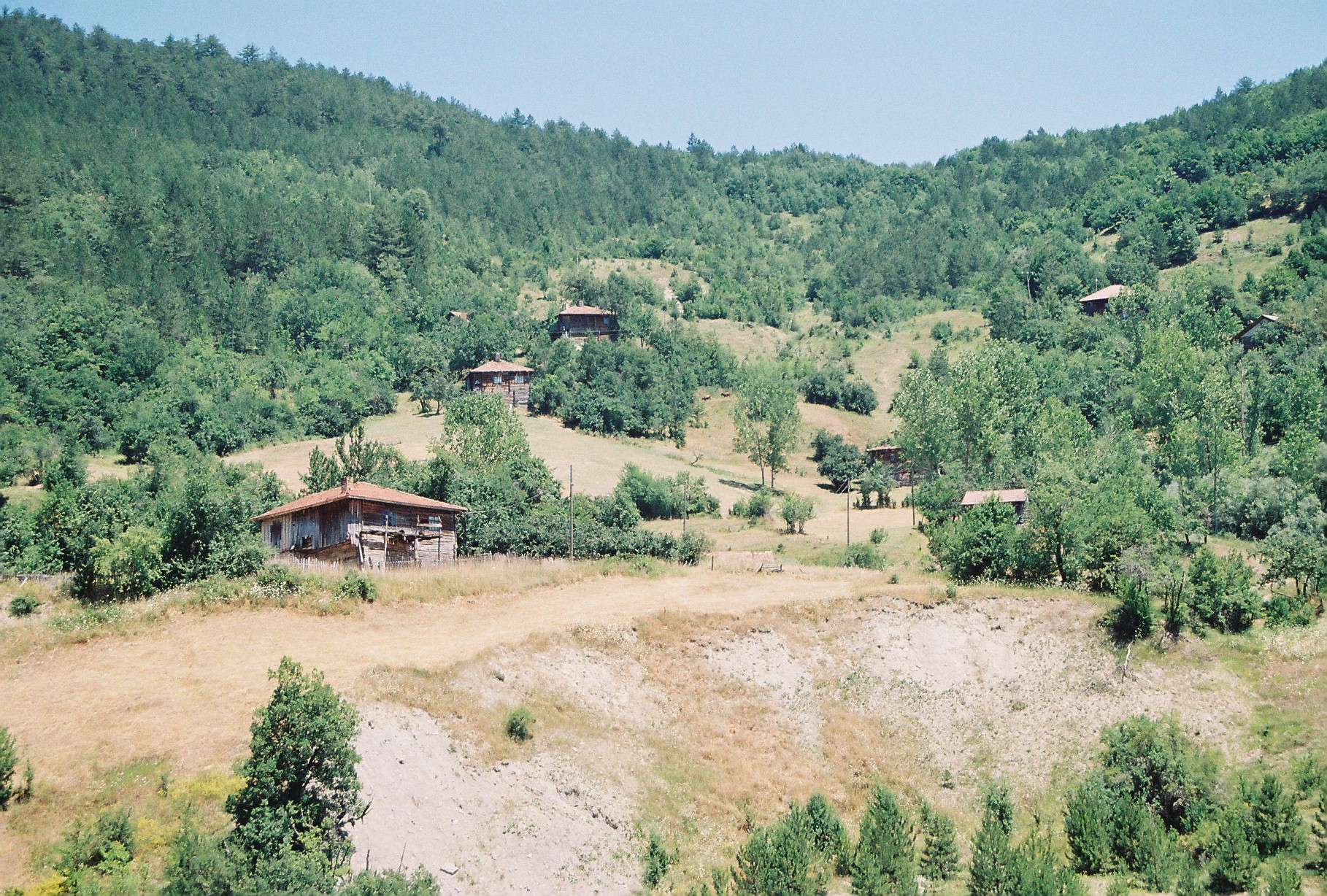
Traditional Turkish houses near Ilısu village at Küre mountains, Pınarbaşı

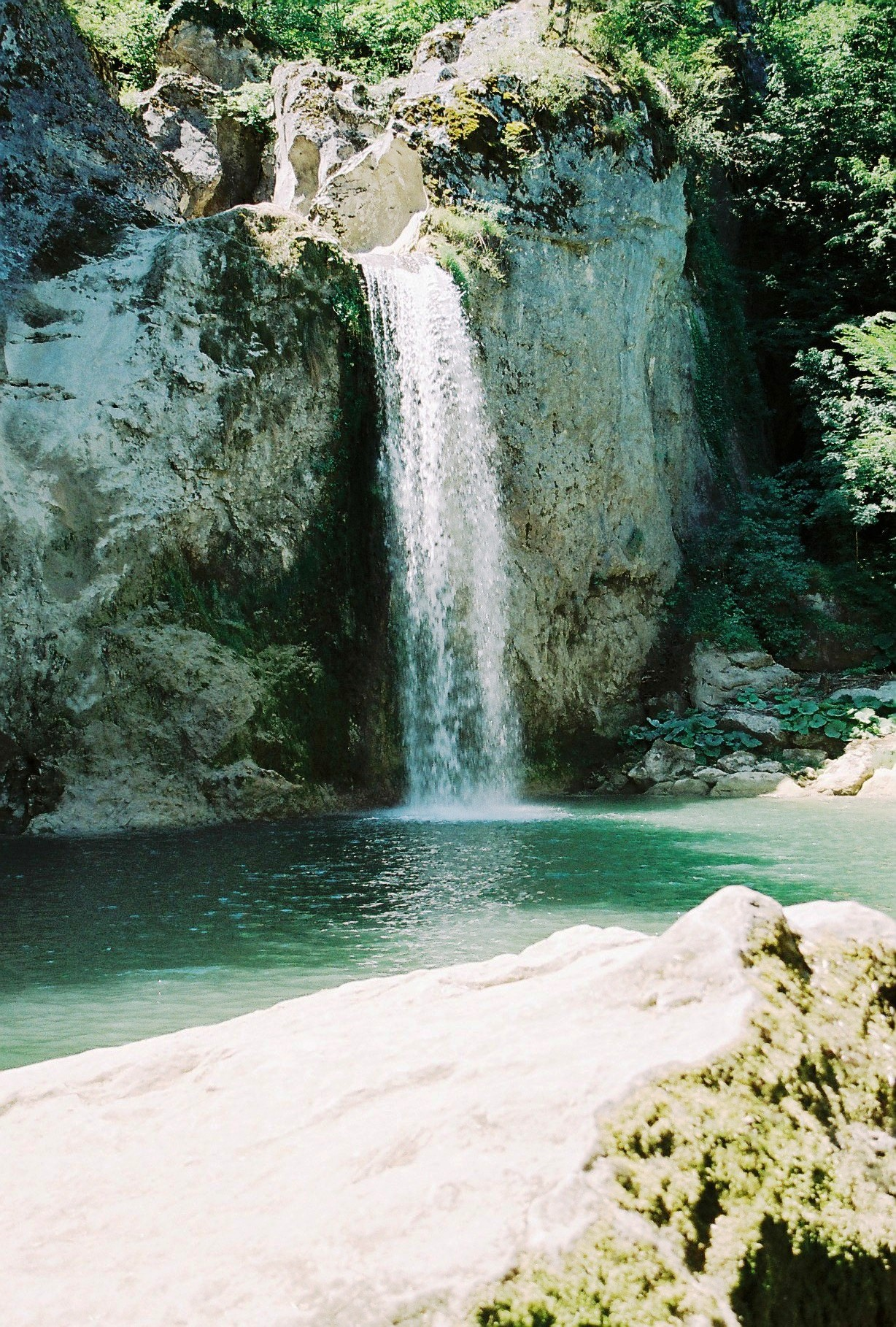
Ilısu Waterfall at Küre Mountains National Park, near Pınarbaşı

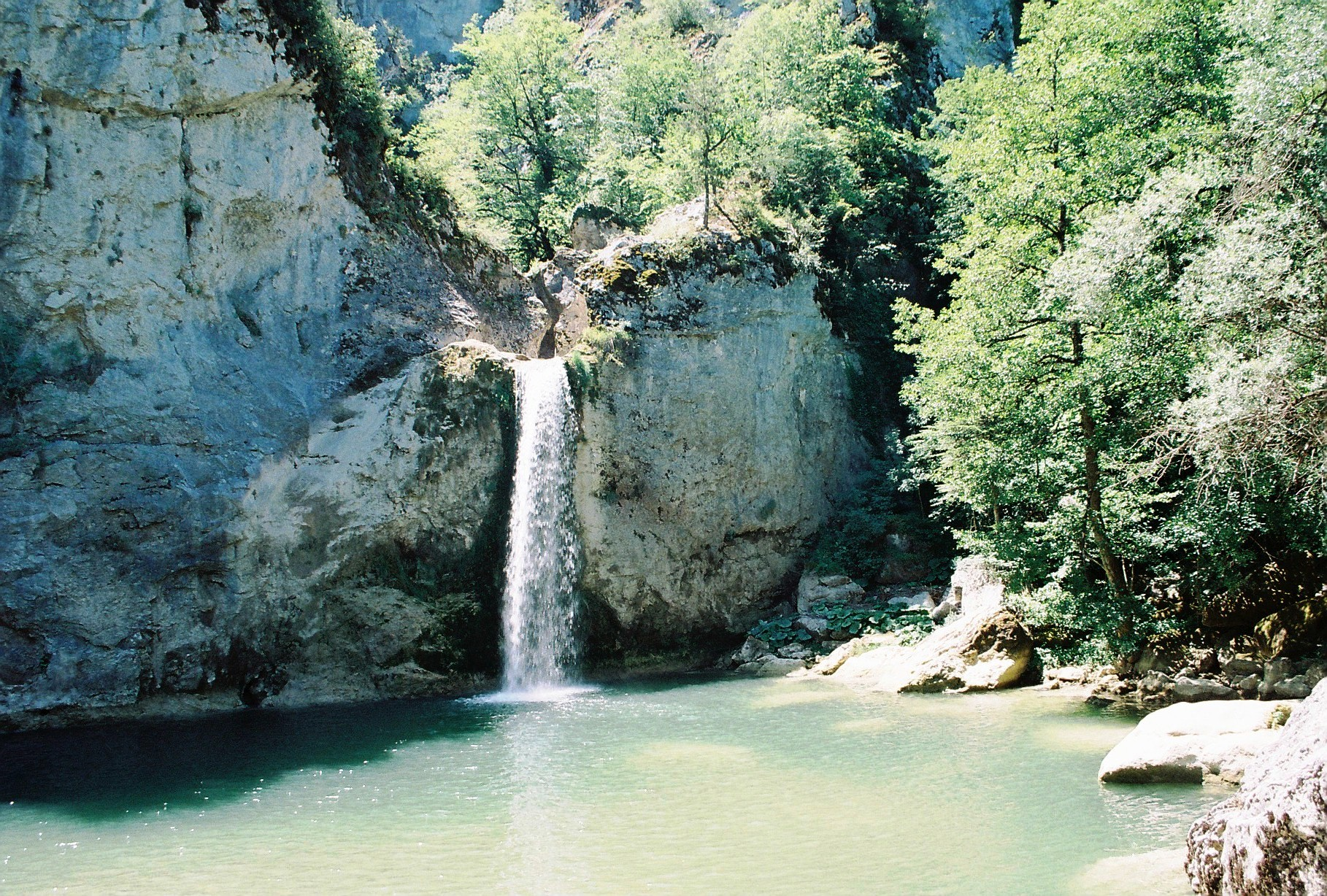
Ilısu Waterfall
