= Ortaköy, Gündoğmuş =

Ortaköy
- Neighbourhood
- Location in Turkey
- Coordinates: 36.7866°N 32.1220°E
- Country: Turkey
- Province: Antalya
- District: Gündoğmuş
- Population (2022): 398
- Time zone: UTC+3 (TRT)

Ortaköy is a neighbourhood in the municipality and district of Gündoğmuş, Antalya Province, Turkey. Its population is 398 (2022). Before the 2013 reorganisation, it was a town (belde).
