= Köprülü, Gündoğmuş =

Köprülü
- Neighbourhood
- Location in Turkey
- Coordinates: 36.7323°N 32.1850°E
- Country: Turkey
- Province: Antalya
- District: Gündoğmuş
- Population (2022): 427
- Time zone: UTC+3 (TRT)

Köprülü is a neighbourhood in the municipality and district of Gündoğmuş, Antalya Province, Turkey. Its population is 427 (2022). Before the 2013 reorganisation, it was a town (belde).
