= Xuray, Khachmaz =

Xuray
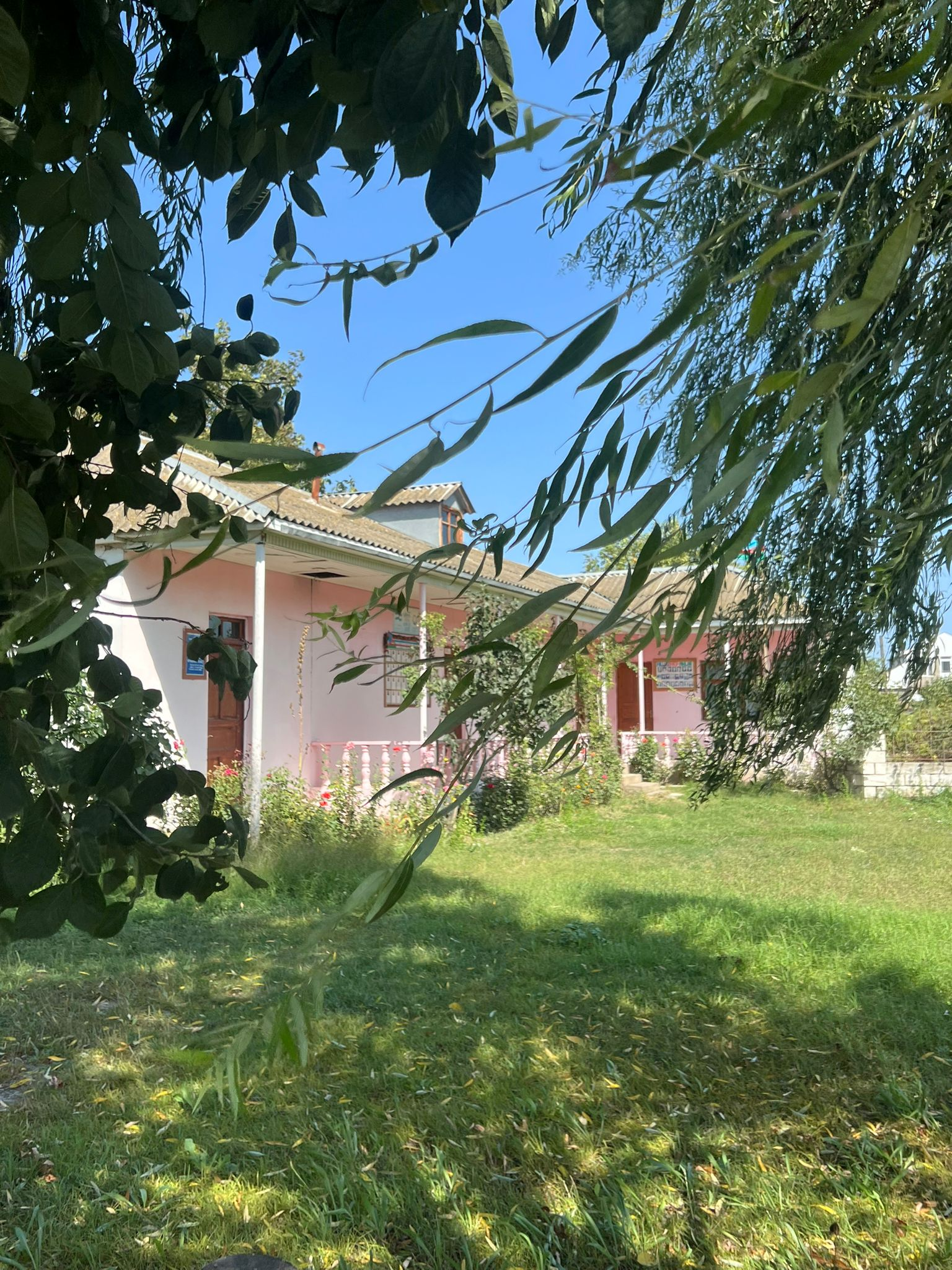

- Location within Azerbaijan
- Coordinates: 41°41′17″N 48°44′39″E
- Country: Azerbaijan
- Rayon: Khachmaz
- Municipality: Seyidlikəndyeri
- Time zone: UTC+4 (AZT)
  - Summer (DST): UTC+5 (AZT)

Xuray (also, Khuray) is a village in the Khachmaz Rayon of Azerbaijan. The village forms part of the municipality of Seyidlikəndyeri.
