= Senir, Gündoğmuş =

Senir
- Neighbourhood
- Location in Turkey
- Coordinates: 36.7943°N 31.9522°E
- Country: Turkey
- Province: Antalya
- District: Gündoğmuş
- Population (2022): 294
- Time zone: UTC+3 (TRT)

Senir is a neighbourhood in the municipality and district of Gündoğmuş, Antalya Province, Turkey. Its population is 294 (2022). Before the 2013 reorganisation, it was a town (belde).
