= Dutluca, Akseki =

Dutluca
- Neighbourhood
- Location in Turkey
- Coordinates: 37.0394°N 31.8059°E
- Country: Turkey
- Province: Antalya
- District: Akseki
- Population (2022): 74
- Time zone: UTC+3 (TRT)

Dutluca is a neighbourhood in the municipality and district of Akseki, Antalya Province, Turkey. Its population is 74 (2022).
