= Xuray, Qusar =

Xuray
- Municipality
- Location within Azerbaijan
- Coordinates: 41°22′03″N 48°18′24″E
- Country: Azerbaijan
- Rayon: Qusar

Population
  - Total: 676
- Time zone: UTC+4 (AZT)
  - Summer (DST): UTC+5 (AZT)

Xuray (also, Khuray) is a village and municipality in the Qusar Rayon of Azerbaijan. It has a population of 676.

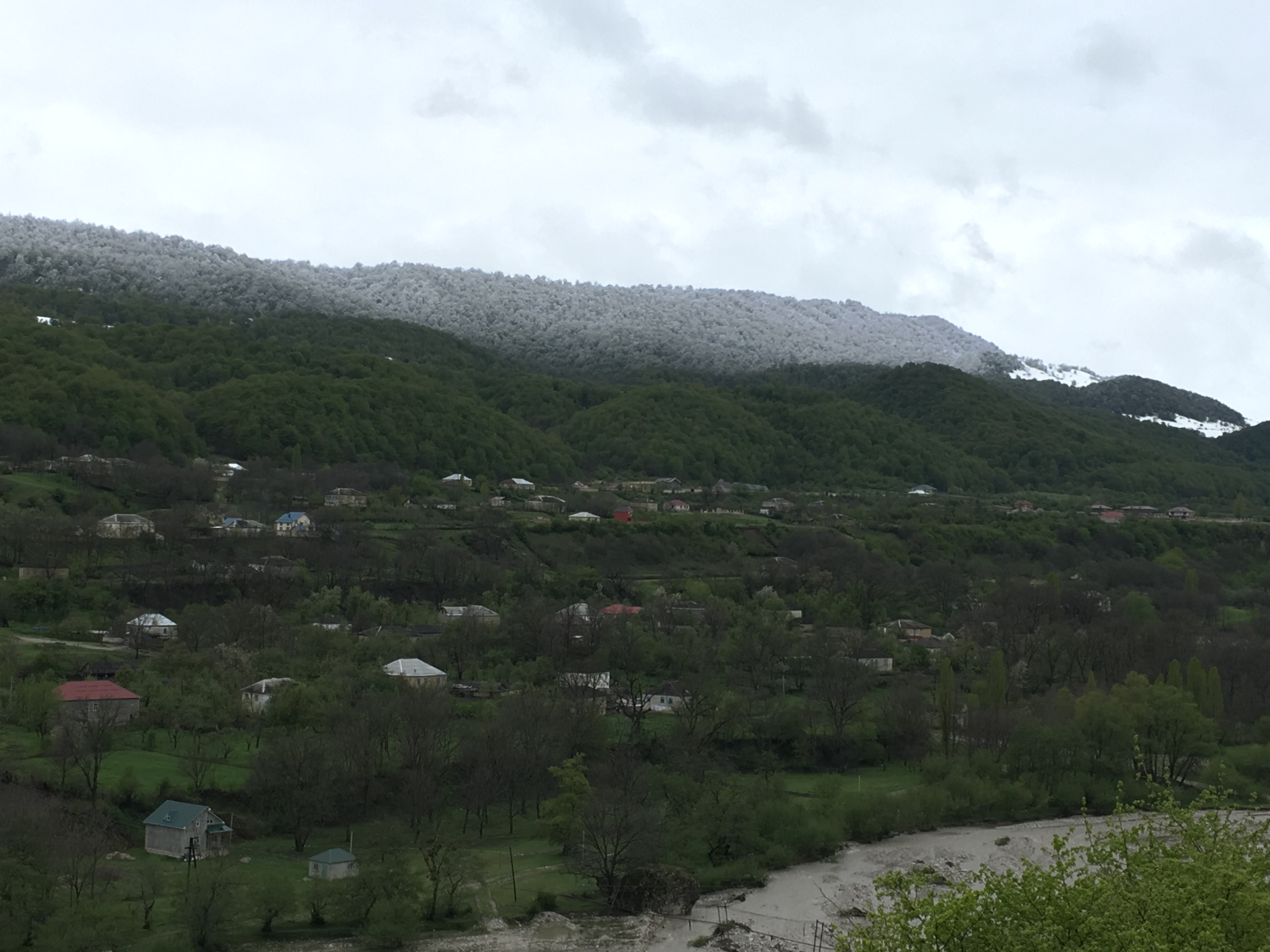
