= Süleymaniye, Akseki =

Süleymaniye Simyan
- Neighbourhood
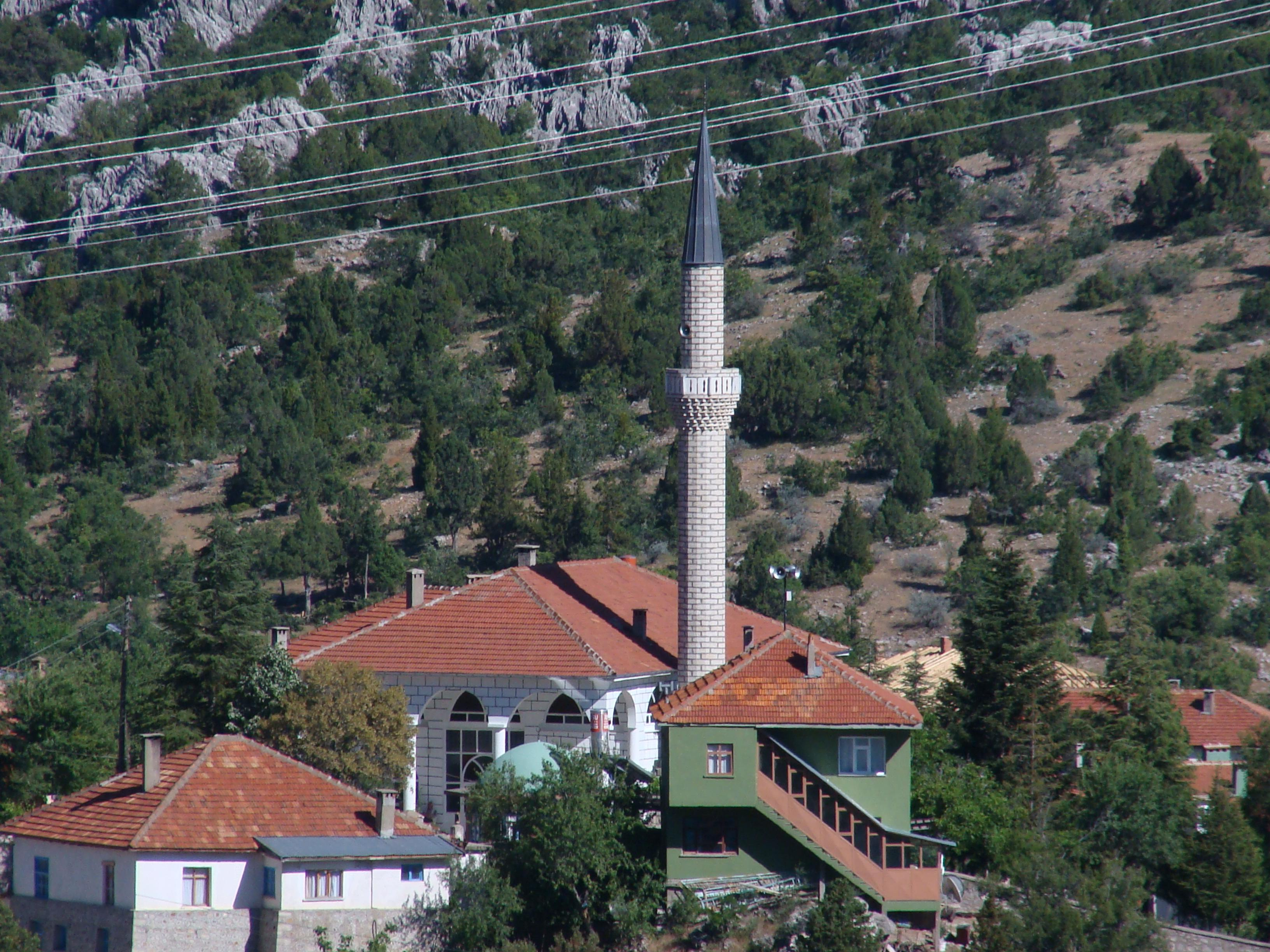

- Location within Turkey
- Coordinates: 37.2922°N 31.7689°E
- Country: Turkey
- Province: Antalya
- District: Akseki
- Population (2022): 404
- Time zone: UTC+3 (TRT)
- Postal code: 07770

Süleymaniye is a neighbourhood in the municipality and district of Akseki, Antalya Province, Turkey. Its population is 404 (2022). Before the 2013 reorganisation, it was a town (belde).

Its old name is Simyan. It is one of the oldest settlements in the area where it is located. It is 42 km (26 mi) from Akseki and 38 km (24 mi) from Seydişehir. The Hadım Plateau is located to the north.

== History ==
The area was conquered by the Seljuk Turks and the Ottoman Empire along with other towns in the area in the 1600s.

== Economy ==
The village used to have a primary school, but it has since closed. The town has a health center with a midwife that can be accessed via an asphalt road. The town also has a drinking water network, electricity, and fixed telephones.

The country boasts an economy based on the cattle and almond trade.
