= Architectural heritage =

Architectural heritage is a form of tangible and immovable cultural heritage centered around the documentation and preservation of the built environment of existing and past buildings and structures built for residential, commercial, industrial, defensive, governmental, and spiritual purposes. These buildings and structures can vary widely in size, sophistication, and design based upon the resources and materials available at the time of construction and the cultural understanding of historical precedents and collective memory of architectural styles known to the architects and builders at the time of design and construction.

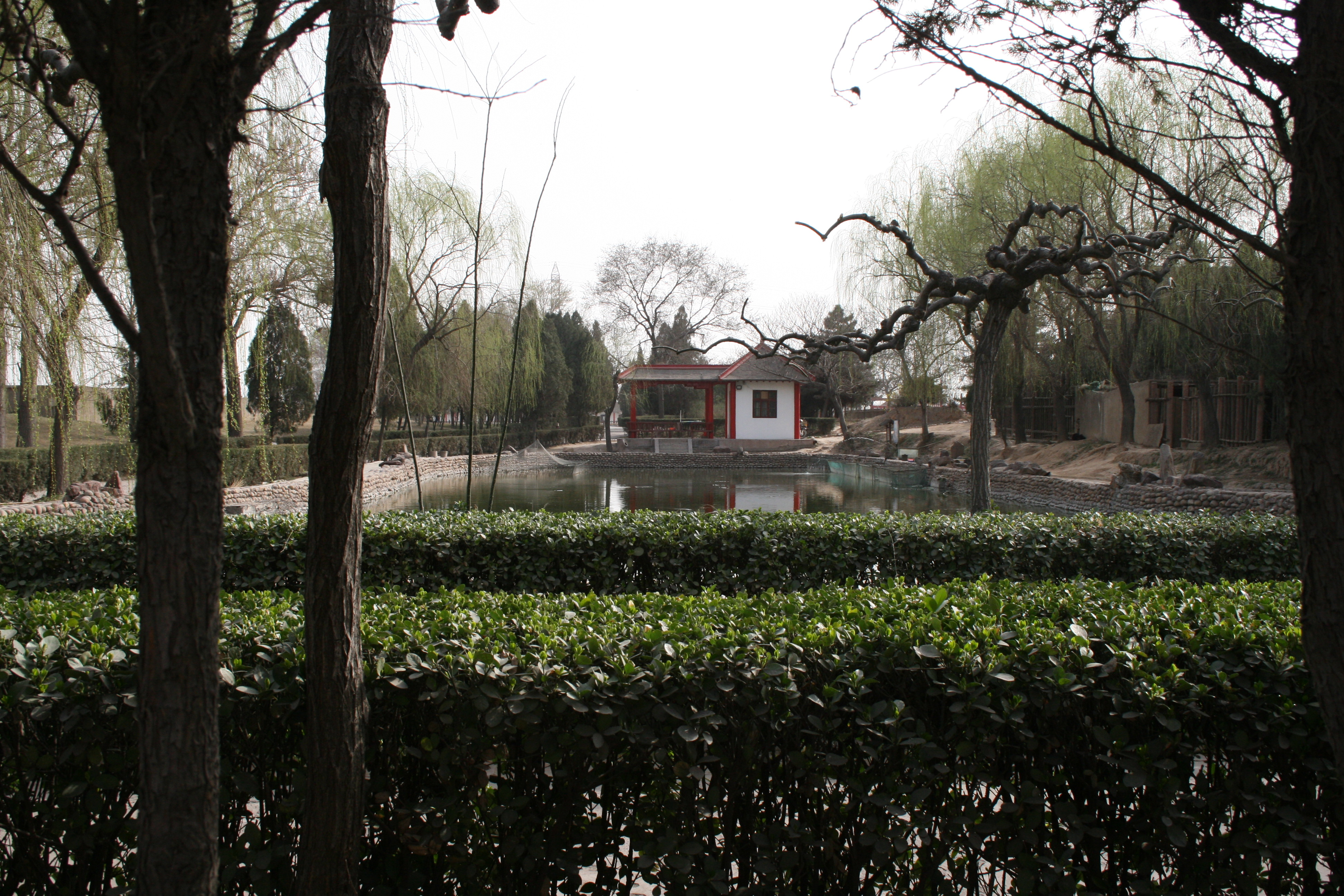
Yinxu world heritage site, Xinzheng Province, People's Republic of China

These historic buildings and archaeological sites can illustrate the spatial arrangements and sociocultural interactions influenced by the built environments of historic times, and can vary in importance based upon the cultural significance or physical rarity of a particular type of architectural structure. Additionally, the historic and prehistoric interactions between humans, the environment, land and sea usage, and interaction with other cultures can play a significant role in the development of stages of civilization and human history, including traditions, ideas, beliefs, and artistic and literary works that can display human creative genius and outstanding universal significance.

== Study of architectural heritage sites ==
Architectural heritage can be studied by architects, architectural historians, cultural historians, archaeologists, anthropologists, and a variety of other disciplines through such methods as surveys, delineations, measurements, drawings, and renderings to depict existing structures of historical significance or heritage value, study and conservation of past drawings, blueprints, and renderings of existing and past buildings, and geospatial surveys and scans of historic or archaeological sites, including satellite images, photogrammetry, LIDAR scans, and SONAR renderings of underwater submerged archaeological sites. Surveys, delineations, drawings, and renderings, when properly conserved as part of the documentary heritage of the architectural tradition, can be digitized to help ensure their conservation and communication in the event of the original copy or the extant structure being destroyed.

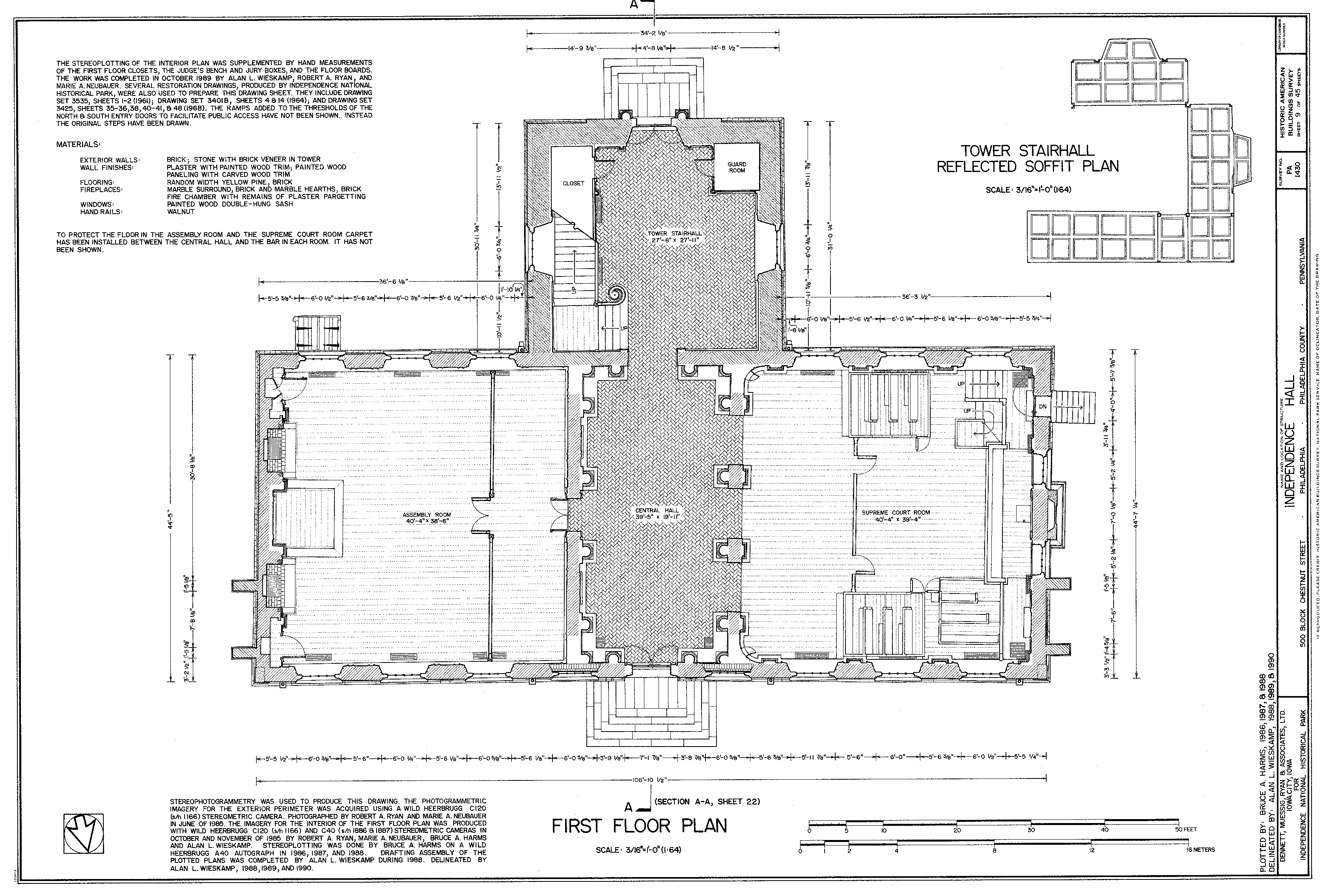
Measured drawing of Independence Hall, Philadelphia, Pennsylvania, United States

Geospatial surveys and scans can also help researchers see evidence of historic or prehistoric structures that might not be visible to the naked eye, for example if only foundations of the structures remain underground, if geological shifts or volcanic eruptions have caused the buildings to become buried under sedimentation or ash deposits, if once land based archaeological sites have become buried underwater due to rising sea levels or geological shifts, or in the event the site is simply too inaccessible to be physically accessed by researchers due to excessive vegetation cover or rough and jagged terrain. These delineations, surveys, and scans can help researchers understand the types of buildings and structures historic and prehistoric people built, as well as what they show about how people interacted with each other and their environment.

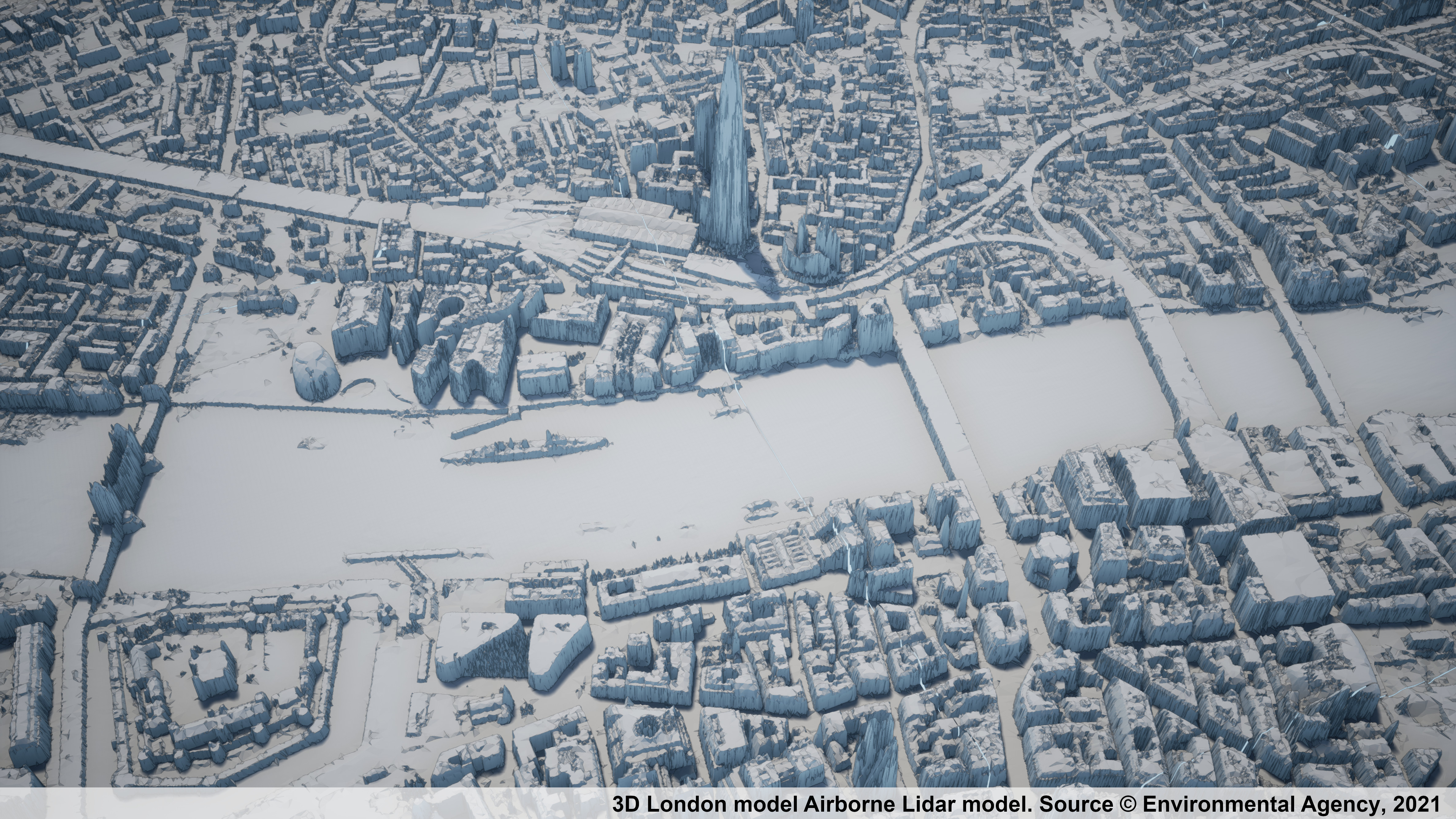
LIDAR scan of central London, United Kingdom

== Human and natural threats to architectural heritage sites ==
Architectural heritage sites can be threatened by a number of human and natural threats, such as armed conflicts, lack of preservation or conservation measures, demolition or excessive modification, exposure to environmental elements, and natural disasters such as hurricanes, typhoons, tornadoes, floods, earthquakes, and excessive winds. Additionally, excessive tourism can also pose a threat to the integrity of the historic sites if poorly managed or insufficient preventive conservation measures are in place.

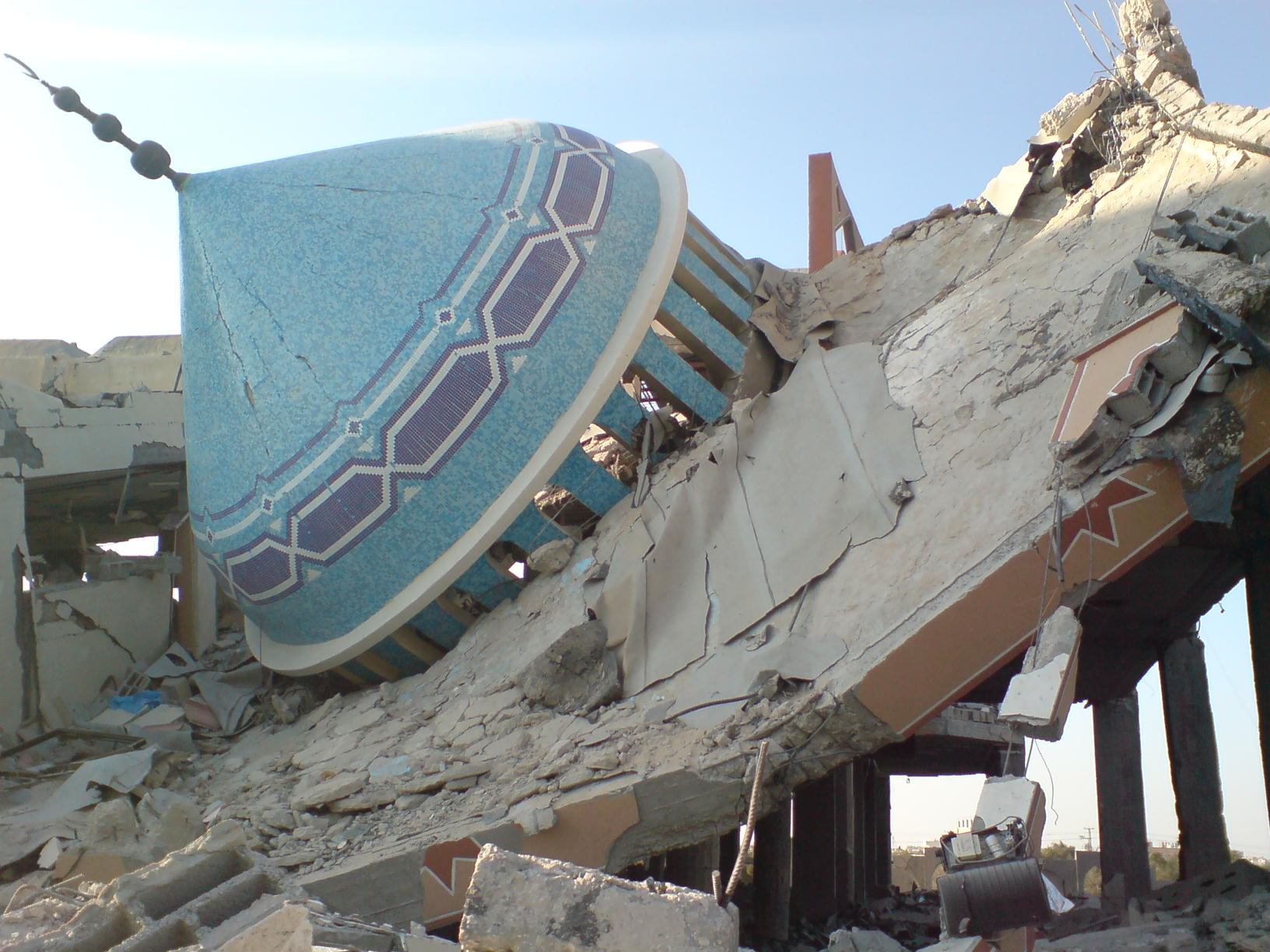
Mosque destroyed due to armed conflict in Rafah, Gaza

== Architectural conservation and historic preservation ==
Ongoing assessments and monitoring of architectural heritage sites help maintenance and restoration personnel identify architectural elements that are in a stable state of conservation and which elements are in need of treatment and restorations. These ongoing assessments might include wood treatments, historic paint analyses, pest and rodent control, and monitoring of temperature and relative humidity.

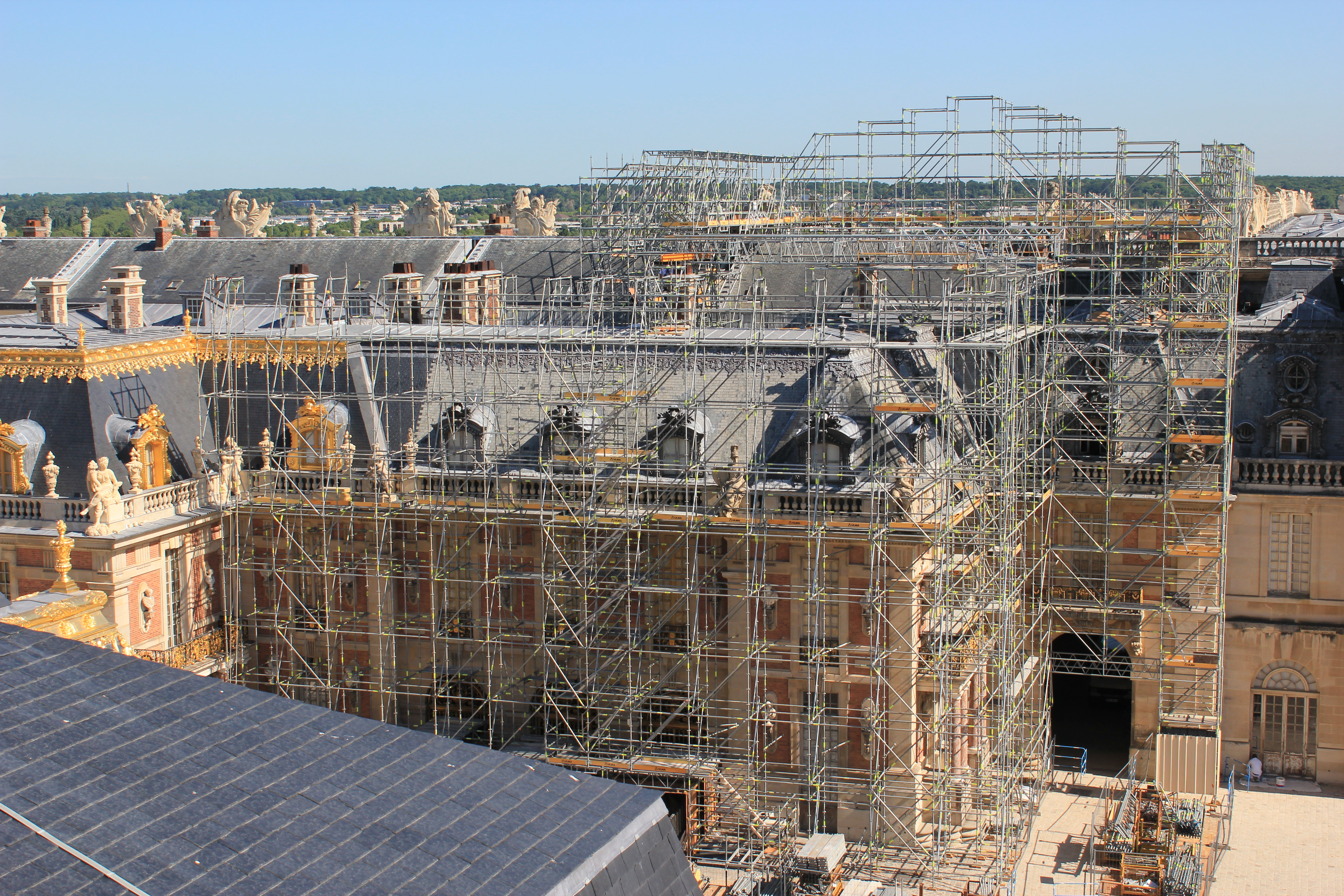
Architectural restoration treatments at Chateau de Versailles, Ile de France, French Republic

Architectural preservation treatments can run from smaller scale restorations to major reconstructions. Smaller scale restorations might include repainting and refinishing surfaces, environmental barriers, water gilding, sandblasting fixtures, and repairing utility connections, such as electrical wires and plumbing pipes. Larger scale restorations and reconstructions might seek to demolish architectural elements or portions of buildings in the interest of restoring the overall structure to an earlier state which better represents a period in history which the architectural significance of the building is better associated with.

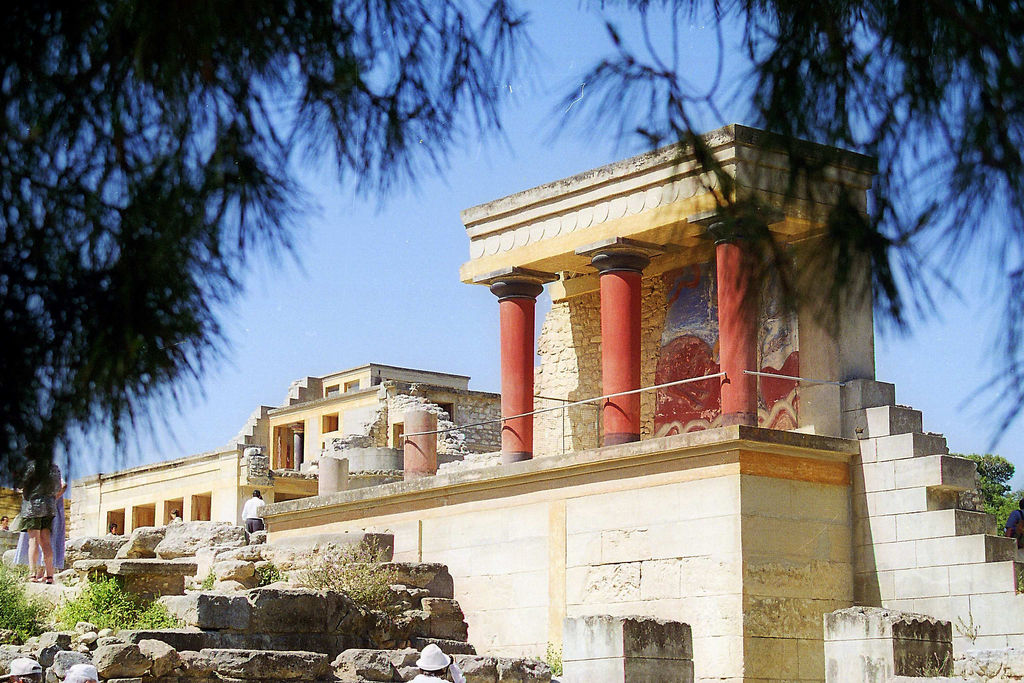
Reconstructed Palace of Minos in Knossos, Crete, Hellenic Republic

Similar to any form of tangible cultural property, architects, restorers, historic site and museum professionals always recommend involving a conservator before undertaking any major restoration projects on a site with architectural heritage significance. Additionally, many restoration projects require the involvement of a structural engineer to determine if the proposed modifications and treatments might negatively impact the structural integrity of the building or surrounding elements, or if additional building permits and inspections might be necessary before undertaking the work.

At the international level, the United Nations Educational, Scientific, and Cultural Organization administers the World Heritage Program to identify locations whose architectural or natural heritage, or some combination thereof, have outstanding universal value measured against a set of ten criteria, including representation of masterpieces of human creative genius, exhibiting important interchanges of human values, bearing a unique or at least exceptional testimony to a cultural tradition or civilization which is living or has disappeared, and being an outstanding example of a type of building, architectural, or technical ensemble or landscape which illustrates a significant stage in human history. Locations inscribed on the World Heritage List can be eligible to receive funds from the World Heritage Fund to help protect the architectural heritage sites, which is funded from voluntary and involuntary contributions from the state parties to the World Heritage Convention.

UNESCO World Heritage Program Emblem

Most nations have a mechanism to identify historic buildings and heritage sites of national or regional significance which should be protected from unauthorized demolition or alteration, such as the United States Department of the Interior's National Register of Historic Places. Additionally, some nations, such as the United Kingdom, further assign historic structures into categories based upon their historical and architectural significance, such as Historic England's grading of listed buildings. These grades and categories can help governments, planning and zoning organizations, grant distributors, historical societies, and property managers obtain the resources necessary to maintain and conserve buildings and structures of outstanding universal value, while allowing for some flexibility for modification and use of sites of lower historical significance.
