= Climax =

Climax may refer to:

== Language arts ==
- Climax (narrative), the point of highest tension in a narrative work
- Climax (rhetoric), a figure of speech that lists items in order of importance

== Biology ==
- Climax community, a biological community that has reached a steady state because the life there is best adapted to the area
- Climax (sexual), another expression for orgasm
- Climax (beetle), a genus of beetles

== Film and television ==
- Climax (1965 film), a 1965 Norwegian drama film
- Climax (2013 film), a 2013 Indian biographical film
- Climax (2018 film), a 2018 French-Belgian horror film
- Climax (TV series), a 2026 South Korean television series
- Climax!, a 1950s American television series

== Music ==
- Climax (band), a 1970s American rock band best known for their soft rock hit "Precious and Few"
- Climax Blues Band, a British blues-based rock band formed in 1968
- Climax (Beastmilk album), 2013
- Climax (La'Mule album), 2001
- Climax (Ohio Players album), by American band The Ohio Players
- Climax (Plan B album), 2018
- "Climax" (Usher song), a 2012 song by singer Usher
- "Climax", a 2015 song by Maluma from PB.DB The Mixtape
- "Climax", a 2000 song by hip hop group Slum Village
- "Climax", a 1992 song by Susumu Hirasawa from the video game Detonator Orgun 3
- Climax, a 2013 album by the Spanish singer Edurne
- Clymax, a record label by Bill Haley when he was with Bill Haley & His Comets
- Klymaxx, an all-female R&B band

== People ==
- John Climacus, 7th-century Christian monk at the monastery on Mount Sinai
- Climax Lawrence, Indian footballer

== Places ==
=== Canada ===
- Climax, Saskatchewan

=== Turkey ===
- Climax (Paphlagonia), a town of ancient Paphlagonia

=== United States ===
- Climax, Colorado, an unincorporated mining village and a former post office
- Climax, Georgia
- Climax, Kansas
- Climax, Kentucky
- Climax, Michigan
- Climax Township, Michigan
- Climax, Minnesota
- Climax Springs, Missouri
- Climax, New York, a hamlet in Greene County
- Climax, North Carolina
- Climax, Ohio, an unincorporated community
- Climax, Oregon, an unincorporated community
- Climax, Pennsylvania
- Climax, Texas
- Climax, Virginia

== Transportation ==
- Climax locomotive, a geared steam locomotive

== Video games ==
- Climax Entertainment, a video game studio based in Japan
- Climax Group, a global game development studio

== Other uses ==
- Coventry Climax, an engine manufacturer

== See also ==
- The Climax (disambiguation)
