= Amastris of Heraclea =

Persian princess (died c. 284 BC)

Amastris
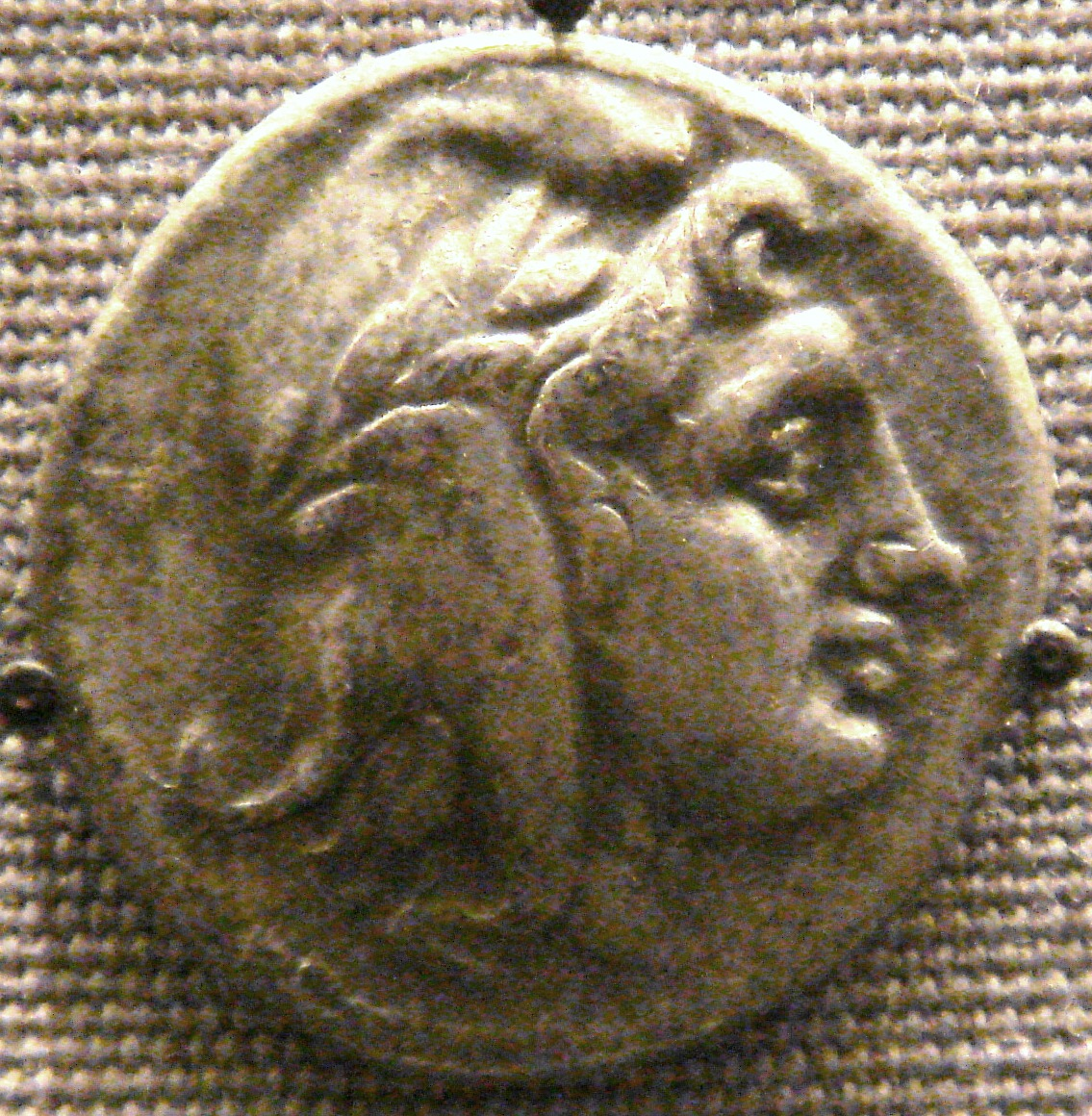
- Didrachm of Amastris. Amastris was the first woman to issue coins in her own name. British Museum.

Regent of Heraclea
- Regency: 306/5 – c. 300 BC
- Monarchs: Clearchus II & Oxyathres I (joint kingship)

Basilissa regnant of Heraclea
- Reign: c. 300 – c. 284 BC
- Co-rulers: Clearchus II & Oxyathres I
- Born: c. 340/39 BC; Persia
- Died: c. 284 BC; Heraclea Pontica (modern-day Karadeniz Ereğli, Zonguldak, Turkey)
- Spouses: Craterus; Dionysius; Lysimachus
- Issue: Clearchus II and Oxyathres
- Father: Oxyathres

Amastris (Ancient Greek: Ἄμαστρις; c. 340/39–284 BC) also called Amastrine (Ἀμαστρινή), was a Persian princess, and Basilissa-regnant of the city of Heraclea from circa 300 BC to her death. She was the daughter of Oxyathres, the brother of the Persian King Darius III. She was the first woman in Asia Minor publicly identified as the political, economic, and administrative royal authority.

== Life ==
Little is known about Amastris' life before her first marriage. From her paternal namesake, it can be concluded that she did not have brothers. As a Persian royal woman, she would have been trained in managerial duty.

Amastris was given by Alexander the Great in marriage to Craterus. However, in 322 BC, she married Dionysius, tyrant of Heraclea Pontica, in Bithynia and Craterus married Phila, one of the daughters of Antipater. The instigator of this separation is unclear, with some sources claiming it was instigated by Craterus, while others argue the opposite. Through this marriage, Dionysius was able to greatly increase his wealth, expand his power, and improve the welfare and loyalty of his subjects. They had three children together: Amastris, born around 321/0, Clearchus, born 320/19, and Oxyathres, born 319/8.

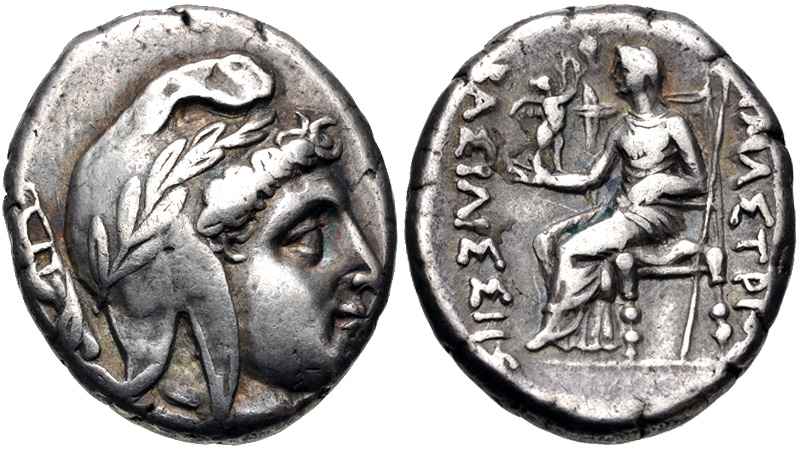
Stater issued by Queen Amastris. The lunar god Men is featured on the left wearing a Phrygian cap, with Aphrodite-Anahita seated on the right, holding Eros in extended right hand

After the death of Dionysius in 305, Amastris became guardian of their children and regent queen of Heraclea. Several notable individuals joined her administration, including Antigonus I Monophthalmus temporarily.

Amastris married Lysimachus in 302. Together they may have had a son, Alexander, though Alexander's maternity is controversial. After the Battle of Ipsus, Lysimachus summoned Amastris to Sardis. Shortly after, they separated and Lysimachus married Arsinoe II, one of the daughters of Ptolemy I Soter, the first Pharaoh of Ptolemaic Egypt.

After her marriage to Lysimachus ended Amastris retired to Heraclea, which she governed as tyrant in her own right. She remained an ally of Lysimachus. She also founded a city named after herself, Amastris, shortly after 300 on the sea-coast of Paphlagonia through the fusion (synoecism) of four smaller towns: Sesamus, Cromna, Cytorus, and Tium. Tium later regained its autonomy, but the other three remained part of the city and Amastris' territory. She was involved in the city's resettlement and likely received religious honors as its founder and protector. Either through her rule, heritage, or one of her marriages she was considered basilissa, as is written on her coinage.

She was drowned by her two sons around 284 but the matricide was avenged by Lysimachus, who made himself master of Heraclea and put both Clearchus and Oxyathres to death.

== Sources ==
- Henry Gardiner Adams, ed. (1857). "Amastris" . A Cyclopaedia of Female Biography: 35. Wikidata Q115651705 – via Wikisource.
- Heckel, Waldemar (2006). Who's Who in the Age of Alexander the Great: Prosopography of Alexander's Empire. Blackwell Publishing. ISBN 978-1405188395.
