= Dionysius of Heraclea =

4th-century BC tyrant of Heraclea Pontica

- Tyrannos, Basileus
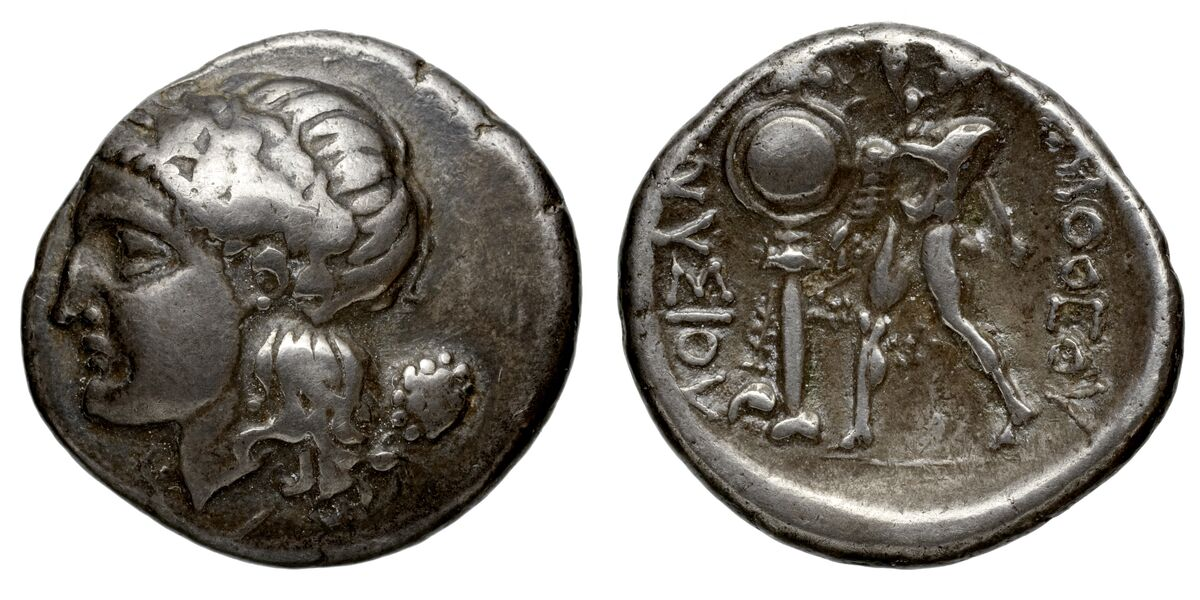
- Obverse: Dionysus, ivy wreath. Reverse: Heracles erecting trophy, lion skin, club; ΤΙΜΟΘΕΟΥ ΔΙΟΝΥΣΙΟΥ.

Tyrant of Heraclea
- Reign: 346–306/305 BC
- Co-ruler: Timotheus (r. 346–337 BC)

King of Heraclea
- Reign: 306/305 BC
- Successor: Amastris (regent); Clearchus II & Oxyathres I (joint kingship)
- Died: 305 BC (aged 55); Heraclea Pontica
- Spouse: (1) Unknown (2) Amastris, daughter of Oxathres (brother of Darius III)
- Issue: Clearchus II; Oxathres; Amastris (daughter)
- Father: Clearchus I

Dionysius (Ancient Greek: Διονύσιος, romanized: Dionysios) was a tyrant of Heraclea Pontica on the Euxine (the Black Sea). He was a son of Clearchus, who had assumed the tyranny in his place of birth.

When Clearchus died (353/352 BC), he was first succeeded by his brother Satyrus, who reigned as guardian for Clearchus' sons, Timotheus and Dionysius. Satyrus was succeeded by Timotheus, who soon shared power with his younger brother Dionysius. After the death of Timotheus, Dionysius became the sole ruler of Heraclea (in 337/336 BC).

After the destruction of the Persian empire by Alexander the Great, Dionysius attempted to extend his dominions in Anatolia. In the meantime, some of the citizens of Heraclea, who had been driven into exile by their tyrants, asked Alexander to restore republican government in Heraclea, but Dionysius, with the assistance of Alexander's sister, Cleopatra of Macedon, acted to prevent any steps being taken to that effect. But, despite these efforts, Dionysius still did not appear to have felt very safe in his position, as evidenced by the delight with which he received the news of Alexander's death. He was so pleased with this development that he erected a statue of euthymia, that is, of joy or peace of mind.

Following Alexander's death, the exiled Heracleans then asked Perdiccas for his assistance. In response, Dionysius endeavoured to secure his position by joining Perdiccas' enemies. Dionysius also married Amastris, the former wife of Craterus. This marriage led to considerable political advantages for Dionysius. He then formed a friendship with Antigonus by assisting him in his war against Asander. Ptolemy, the nephew of Antigonus, married Dionysius' daughter by his first wife.

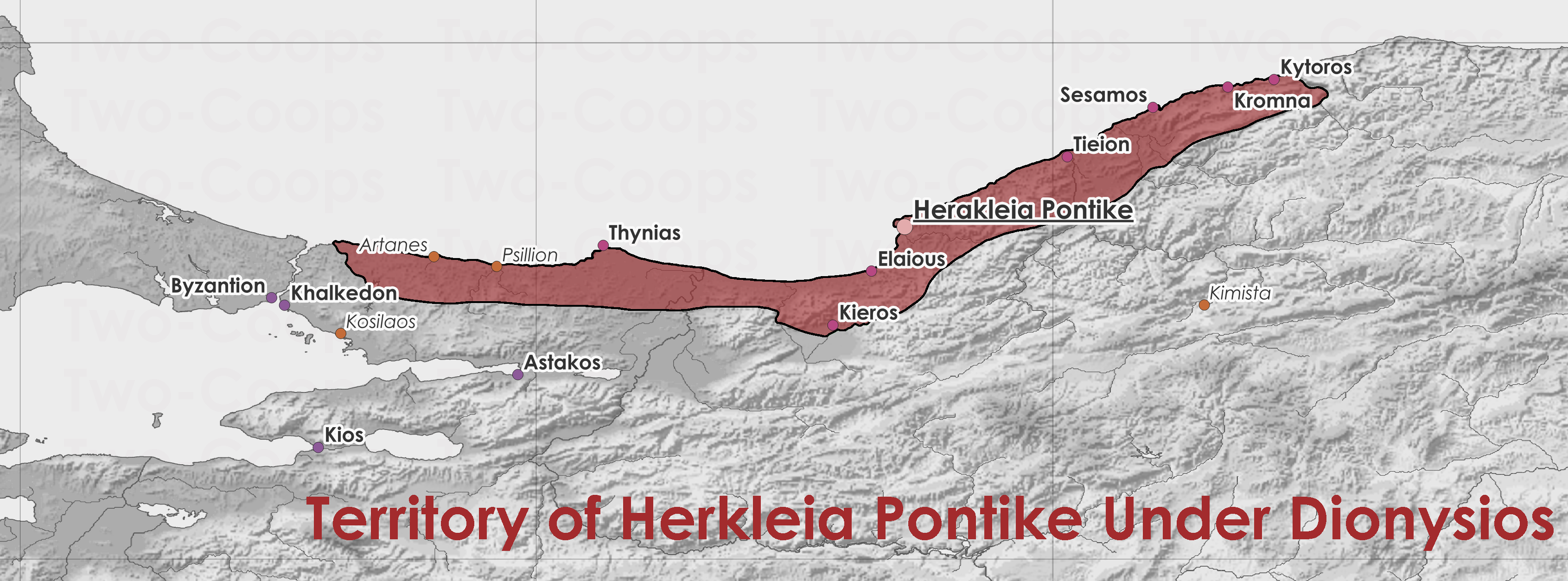
The extent of Herakleote control over Thynia (eastern Bithynia) follows Niese (Geschichte der griechischen und makedonischen Staaten seit der Schlacht bei Chaeronea, Gotha, 1893–1903, vol. 3) and Burstein (Greece's Northern Frontier: Studies in the History of the Ancient Greek Experience in the Black Sea, 2024) in interpreting Apollonius of Rhodes 2.788–789, a passage which may be derived from the local historian Nymphis, as indicating that Herakleia held the whole of Thynia up to the mouth of the Rhebas, not merely the island of Thynias. This reading contrasts with Ed. Meyer (1897: 'Bithynia'. Realencyclopädie 3.1, 512.) and Davaze (Memnon, historien d'Héraclée du Pont: commentaire historique, Le Mans Université, 2013), who identified "tēn Thunida gēn" (Memnon, FGrH 3B, 434 F9.4) with the island of Thynias alone. The broader interpretation is partially corroborated by archaeological evidence indicating that the walls of the Herakleote colony on Thynias were constructed from stone quarried on the opposite mainland (Fıratlı 1953, 16), suggesting a sustained Herakleote presence and control across both the island and the adjacent Bithynian coastline.

Thanks to these actions and alliances, Dionysius was able to remain in undisturbed possession of the tyranny of Heraclea for many years. In 306 BC, when the surviving generals of Alexander assumed the titles of king (basileus), Dionysius followed their example, but he died soon after. The death of Dionysius must have taken place in 306 or 305 BC, as, according to Diodorus, he died at the age of 55, and after a reign of 32 or 33 years. By the time of his death in 305 BC, his dominions extended eastward into Paphlagonia as far as the city of Cytorus and also included the Milesian colonies of Tium, Sesamus, and Cromna. Heraclea's rule reached westward into Bithynia as far as the Rhebas River, encompassing Thynian Thrace.

According to Athenaeus, Dionysius was said to have been the mildest and most just of all the tyrants that had ever lived. He was succeeded by his wife, Amastris, who reigned during the minority of her sons, Clearchus II and Oxyathres.

Coins of Dionysius have been found, some of which were issued during his joint reign with his older brother Timotheus and others during his sole rule.
