= Kromna =

Kromna (Ancient Greek: Κρῶμνα) may refer to:

- Kromna (Arcadia), town in ancient Arcadia, Greece
- Kromna (Corinthia), town in ancient Corinthia, Greece
- Kromna (Paphlagonia), a town of ancient Paphlagonia, now in Turkey

- Amasra, a possible site of the Paphlagonian town
- Kurucaşile, a possible site of the Paphlagonian town
