= Cromna =

Cromna may refer to:

- Cromna (Arcadia), a town of ancient Arcadia, Greece
- Cromna (Corinthia), a town of ancient Corinthia, Greece
- Cromna (Paphlagonia), a town of ancient Paphlagonia, now in Turkey

- Amasra, a possible site of the Paphlagonian town
- Kurucaşile, a possible site of the Paphlagonian town

- Cromna, a genus of fulgoroid planthoppers in the family Flatidae
