= 353 BC =

353 BC in various calendars
Gregorian calendar	353 BC; CCCLIII BC
Ab urbe condita	401
Ancient Egypt era	XXX dynasty, 28
Pharaoh	Nectanebo II, 8
Ancient Greek Olympiad (summer)	106th Olympiad, year 4
Assyrian calendar	4398
Balinese saka calendar	N/A
Bengali calendar	−946 – −945
Berber calendar	598
Buddhist calendar	192
Burmese calendar	−990
Byzantine calendar	5156–5157
Chinese calendar	丁卯年 (Fire Rabbit); 2345 or 2138 — to — 戊辰年 (Earth Dragon); 2346 or 2139
Coptic calendar	−636 – −635
Discordian calendar	814
Ethiopian calendar	−360 – −359
Hebrew calendar	3408–3409
- Hindu calendars
Vikram Samvat	−296 – −295
Shaka Samvat	N/A
Kali Yuga	2748–2749
Holocene calendar	9648
Iranian calendar	974 BP – 973 BP
Islamic calendar	1004 BH – 1003 BH
Javanese calendar	N/A
Julian calendar	N/A
Korean calendar	1981
Minguo calendar	2264 before ROC 民前2264年
Nanakshahi calendar	−1820
Thai solar calendar	190–191
Tibetan calendar	阴火兔年 (female Fire-Rabbit) −226 or −607 or −1379 — to — 阳土龙年 (male Earth-Dragon) −225 or −606 or −1378

Year 353 BC was a year of the pre-Julian Roman calendar. At the time, it was known as the Year of the Consulship of Peticus and Poplicola (or, less frequently, year 401 Ab urbe condita). The denomination 353 BC for this year has been used since the early medieval period, when the Anno Domini calendar era became the prevalent method in Europe for naming years.

== Events ==
=== By place ===
==== Persian Empire ====
- Mausolus, King and Persian satrap of Caria, dies and is succeeded in 352 BC by Artemisia, his sister and wife.

==== Greece ====
- The Phocians threaten Thessaly to their north. Philip II of Macedon saw his opportunity to penetrate south.
- Clearchus, the tyrant of Heraclea, a Greek city on the Black Sea, is murdered by some of the city's citizens led by Chion after a reign of twelve years. Most of the conspirators are killed by the tyrant's body-guards upon the spot, while others are captured and put to death. Within a short time, the city falls under the rule of the new tyrant Satyrus, Clearchus' brother.

== Deaths ==
- Clearchus of Heraclea, tyrant of Heraclea Pontica (assassinated) (b. c. 401 BC)
- Iphicrates, Athenian general (b. c. 418 BC)
- Mausolus, King and Persian satrap of Caria
