= Peri Bathous, Or the Art of Sinking in Poetry =

1726 short essay by Alexander Pope

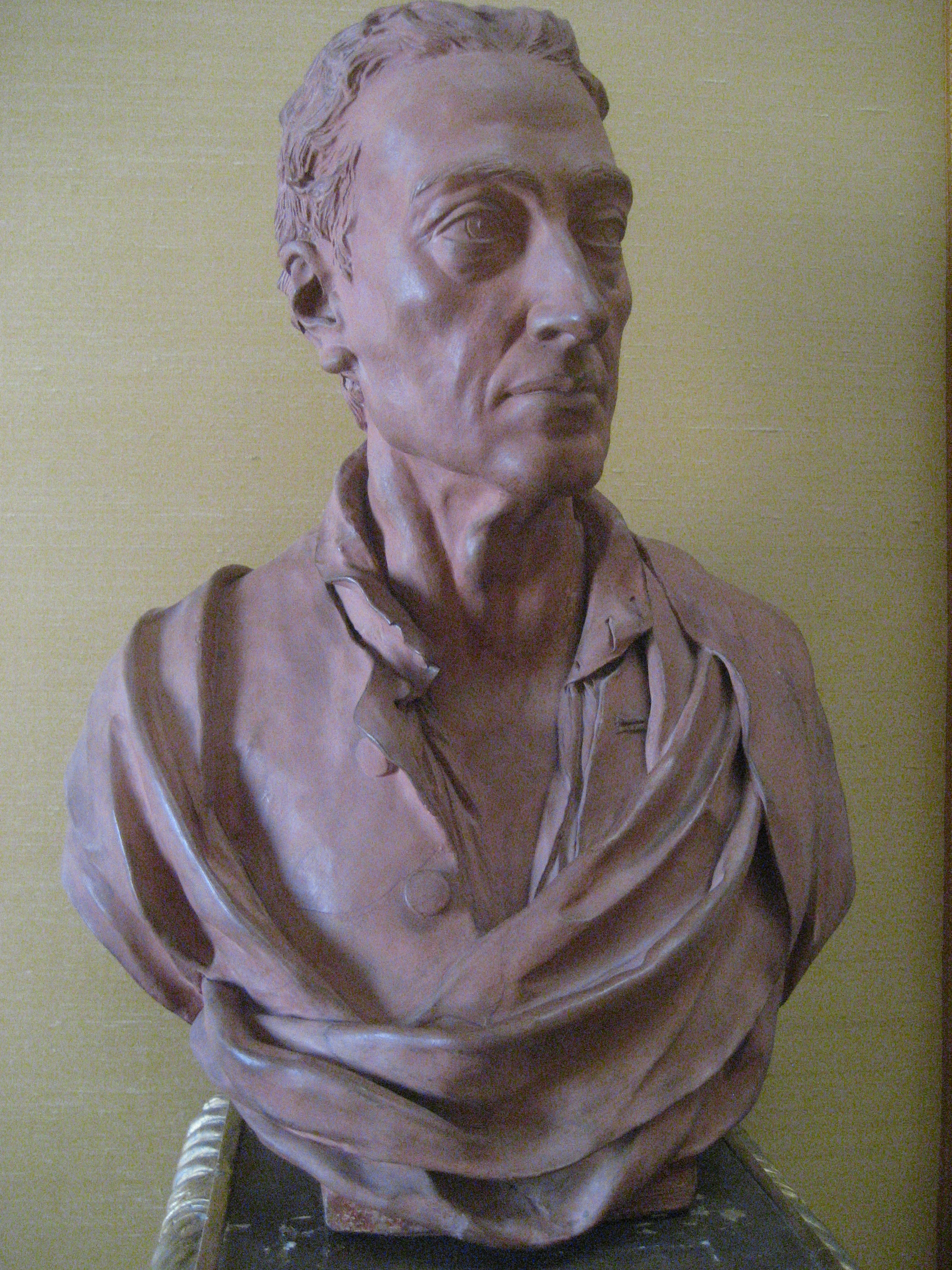
Alexander Pope published "Peri Bathous" in 1728.

"Peri Bathous, Or the Art of Sinking in Poetry" is a short essay by Alexander Pope published in 1728. The aim of the essay is to ridicule contemporary poets.

== Content ==
"Peri Bathous" is a blow Pope struck in an ongoing struggle against the "dunces". It is a prose parody of Longinus' Peri Hupsous (On the Sublime), in that he imitates Longinus' system for the purpose of ridiculing contemporary poets. According to John Upton, the title reflects an actual phrase in Longinus' treatise, εἰ ἔστιν ὕψους τις ἢ βάθους τέχνη, in which "βάθους" is a scribal error for "πάθους". Upton's reading of Longinus does not, however, appear to have been universally accepted.

With the essay, Pope introduced the use of the term "bathos" (Greek βάθος, depth, the antonym to ὕψος (hupsos), height) to mean a failed attempt at sublimity, a ridiculous failure to sustain it, or, more generally, an anticlimax.

Although Pope's manual of bad verse offers numerous methods for writing poorly, of all these ways to "sink", the method that is most remembered now is the act of combining very serious matters with very trivial ones. The radical juxtaposition of the serious with the frivolous does two things. First, it violates "decorum", or the fittingness of subject, and, second, it creates humor with an unexpected and improper juxtaposition.

=== Unintentionally comical uses of tropes and figures ===
In chapters X and XI, Pope explains the bathetic use of tropes and figures of speech, by means of examples selected largely from the works of Richard Blackmore (Prince Arthur) and of Ambrose Philips. Pope pedantically divides these tropes into "the variegating" (catachresis, metonymy, synecdoche, aposiopesis, metaphor); the "confounding or reversing" (mixed metaphor, jargon, paranomasia, antithesis); "the magnifying" (hyperbole, periphrasis); and "the diminishing" (anticlimax, "the vulgar" [meaning the selection of a comically low metaphier], "the infantine" [meaning infantile diction], inanity, "the expletive" [meaning pleonasm], macrology, and tautology).

== Models of reference ==
The nearest model for Pope's essay is the Treatise of the Sublime by Boileau of 1712. Pope admired Boileau, but one of Pope's (and Swift's) literary adversaries, Leonard Welsted, had issued a "translation" of Longinus in 1726 that was merely a translation of Boileau. Because Welsted and Pope's other foes were championing this "sublime," Pope commented upon and countered their system with his Peri Bathous in the Swift-Pope-Gay-Arbuthnot Miscellanies. Whereas Boileau had offered a detailed discussion of all the ways in which poetry could ascend or be "awe-inspiring," Pope offers a lengthy schematic of the ways in which authors might "sink" in poetry, satirizing the very men who were allied with Ambrose Philips. Pope and Philips had been adversaries since the publication of Pope's Odes, and the rivalry broke down along political lines.

One example of Pope's style and satire shows in his description of sinking in painting. In the commonplace Academic hierarchic ranking of pictorial genres, still life ranked the lowest. However, Pope describes how it might fall and, with the single word "stiffen," evokes the unnatural deadness that is a mark of failure even in this "low" genre:

Many Painters who could never hit a Nose or an Eye, have with Felicity copied a Small-Pox, or been admirable at a Toad or a Red-Herring. And seldom are we without Genius's for Still Life, which they can work up and stiffen with incredible Accuracy. ("Peri Bathous" vi).

== See also ==
- 1728 in poetry

== Bibliography ==
- Pope, Alexander (2006). "Peri Bathous, Or the Art of Sinking in Poetry". In Rogers, Pat (ed.). The Major Works. Oxford World's Classics (Revised ed.). New York: Oxford University Press. pp. 195–239. ISBN 9780199203611. LCCN 2006299700. OCLC 70401439. Archived from the original on 24 April 2023.
- Pope, Alexander (1968). Leake Steeves, Edna (ed.). The art of sinking in poetry: Martinus Scriblerus' [Peri bathous]. Bibliographic Notes by Edna Leake Steeves and Reginald H. Griffith. New York: Russell & Russell. LCCN 68015162. OCLC 355937. OL 79418W.
