= Rhebas =

Ancient town of Bithynia

Coordinates: 41°13′28″N 29°13′12″E

Rhebas (Ancient Greek: Ῥήβας) was a coastal town of ancient Bithynia located near the Euxine entrance to the Bosphorus, near the mouth of the Rhebas River.

Its site is tentatively located near Riva in Asiatic Turkey.
