= Timolaeum =

Town on the Black Sea coast of ancient Paphlagonia

Coordinates: 41°59′52″N 33°19′01″E

Timolaeum or Timolaion (Ancient Greek: Τιμολαῖον) was a town on the Black Sea coast of ancient Paphlagonia, at a distance of 40 or 60 stadia north of Climax and 100 to 150 stadia from Cape Carambis (modern Kerempe Burnu).

It is located near Çayyaka in Asiatic Turkey.
