= Diocese of Claudiopolis (Honorias) =

Roman Catholic titular see

Claudiopolis (Greek: Κλαυδιόπολις) was an ancient city in the Roman province of Paphlagonia (and later Honorias) in northern Asia Minor.

It was an episcopal see during Late Antiquity, and remains a titular see of the Roman Catholic Church.

== Residential bishopric and archbishopric ==
As secular capital of the Roman province of Honorias, in the civil Diocese of Pontus, the bishopric of Claudiopolis became the metropolitan see, in the sway of the Patriarchate of Constantinople, with five suffragan sees : Heraclea Pontica, Prusias ad Hypium, Tium, Cratia and Hadrianopolis in Honoriade. It appears as such in the Notitiae Episcopatuum of Pseudo-Epiphanius of about 640 and in that of Byzantine Emperor Leo VI the Wise of the early 10th century, ranking sixteenth viz. seventeenth among the Patriarchate's Metropolitans.

The city, known as Claudiopolis (like several others) under Byzantine rule fell to Turks migrating west in the 11th century who called it Boli, was recaptured by Byzantines in 1097, besieged unsuccessfully by the Sultanate of Rum in 1177 and reconquered at some point before 1214. Under Ottoman rule since the 14th century it lost to Heraclea Pontica the Metropolitan dignity. It ceased to exist as a residential bishopric in the 15th century.

Michel Le Quien mentions twenty bishops of the see to the 13th century; documentary mentions are available for the following incumbent bishops and archbishops:

- the first is St. Autonomus, said to be an Italian missionary who suffered martyrdom under Diocletian.
- Callicrates (mentioned in 363 in Socrates Scolasticus' church history)
- Gerontius (first actual historically documented bishop, in 394 attending the council against Metropolitan Bagadius of Bosra.
- Olympius (in 431)
- Calogerus (449 - 458)
- Carterius (mentioned in 459)
    - Hypatus (circa 518)[dismissed by Janin]
- Epictetus (in 536)
  - Vincentius (in 553) [dismissed by Janin]
- Ciprianus I (in 680)
  - only Janin also includes a bishop Sisinnius, attending the council in Trullo (692), but assigns apparently the same to namesake see Claudiopolis in Isauria
- Nicetas I (in 787)
- Ignatius, a friend and correspondent of Patriarch Photios I of Constantinople
- Ciprianus II (869 - 879)
- Nicetas II (10th-11th centuries)
- John (1028 - 1029)

== Catholic titular see ==
The archdiocese was nominally restored by the Catholic Church as a Latin Metropolitan titular archbishopric no later than the seventeenth century, first named Claudiopolis (Latin) / Claudiopoli (Curiate Italian), renamed in 1933 as Claudiopolis in Honoriade (Latin) / Claudiopoli di Onoriade (Italiano) / Claudiopolitanus in Honoriade (Latin).

It has been held by:

- Alfredo Bruniera (1954.12.12 – 2000.03.26)
- Alain Guynot de Boismenu, Sacred Heart Missionaries (M.S.C.) (1945.01.18 – 1953.11.05)
- Georges-Prudent-Marie Bruley des Varannes (1924.02.13 – 1943.05.29)
- Giuseppe Fiorenza (1905.12.11 – 1924.01.27)
- Giovanni Battista Bertagna (1901.03.26 – 1905.02.11)
- Joseph-Adolphe Gandy, M.E.P. (1889.01.15 – 1892.09.29)
- Eugène-Jean-Claude-Joseph Desflèches (范若瑟), Paris Foreign Missions Society (M.E.P.) (1883.02.20 – 1887.11.07)
- Carlo Gigli (1880.12.13 – 1881.08.24)
- Stephanus Antonius Aucher (1796.07.05 – ?)
- Tommaso Battiloro (1767.11.20 – 1767.12.14)
- Titular Bishop: Joannes Nicastro (1724.09.11 – ?)
- Titular Bishop: Walenty Konstantyn Czulski (1721.02.12 – 1724.02.10?)
- Titular Bishop: Piotr Tarło (1713.01.30 – 1720.12.16)
- Jean-Baptiste Adhémar de Monteil de Grignan (1667.08.03 – 1689.03.09)
- Titular Bishop: Tomás de Paredes, Augustinians (O.E.S.A.) (1652.10.14 – 1667.02.17)
