= Bathos =

Term of literary criticism or of rhetorical technique

In literature and the arts, bathos (UK: /ˈbeɪθɒs/ BAY-thoss; Ancient Greek: βάθος, lit. "depth") is the use of a lofty, elegant, or elevated style to present silly, vulgar, or trivial subject-matter, or a sudden transition from the former to the latter, thereby creating a ludicrous or comedic effect. Nowadays, bathos can refer to such usage occurring either accidentally (through artistic ineptitude) or intentionally as a literary device (usually for the sake of comedy). Originally, it referred to an amusingly failed attempt at presenting artistic greatness and was first used in this sense in Alexander Pope's 1727 essay "Peri Bathous". Intentional bathos appears in satirical genres such as burlesque and mock epic. "Bathos" or "bathetic" is also used for similar effects in other branches of the arts, such as musical passages marked ridicolosamente. In film, bathos may appear in a contrast cut intended for comic relief or be produced by an accidental jump cut.

== Alexander Pope's definition ==
=== The Art of Sinking in Poetry ===
As a term for the combination of the very high with the very low, bathos was introduced by Alexander Pope in his essay Peri Bathous, Or the Art of Sinking in Poetry (1727). On the one hand, Pope's work is a parody in prose of Longinus's Peri Hupsous (On the Sublime), in that he imitates Longinus's system for the purpose of ridiculing contemporary poets, but, on the other, it is a blow Pope struck in an ongoing struggle against the "dunces."

The nearest model for Pope's essay is the Treatise of the Sublime by Boileau of 1712. Pope admired Boileau, but one of Pope's literary adversaries, Leonard Welsted, had issued a "translation" of Longinus in 1726 that was merely a translation of Boileau. Because Welsted and Pope's other foes were championing this "sublime", Pope commented upon and countered their system with his Peri Bathos in the Swift-Pope-Gay-Arbuthnot Miscellanies. Whereas Boileau had offered a detailed discussion of all the ways in which poetry could ascend or be "awe-inspiring", Pope offers a lengthy schematic of the ways in which authors might "sink" in poetry, satirizing the very men who were allied with Ambrose Philips. Pope and Philips had been adversaries since the publication of Pope's Odes, and the rivalry broke down along political lines. According to Pope, bathos can be most readily applicable to love making after two years of marriage which is clearly in binary opposition to the sublime but is no less political. Edmund Burke was believed to be particularly charmed by Pope's articulation of love after marriage, inspiring Burke's essay A Philosophical Enquiry into the Origin of Our Ideas of the Sublime and Beautiful (1756).

One example of Pope's style and satire is in his description of sinking in painting. In the commonplace Academic hierarchic ranking of pictorial genres, still life ranked the lowest. However, Pope describes how it might fall and, with the single word "stiffen", evokes the unnatural deadness that is a mark of failure even in this "low" genre:

Many Painters who could never hit a Nose or an Eye, have with Felicity copied a Small-Pox, or been admirable at a Toad or a Red-Herring. And seldom are we without Genius's for Still Life, which they can work up and stiffen with incredible Accuracy. ("Peri Bathous" vi).

In chapters X and XI, Pope explains the comic use of the tropes and figures of speech.

Although Pope's manual of bad verse offers numerous methods for writing poorly, of all these ways to "sink", the method that is most remembered now is the act of combining very serious matters with very trivial ones. The radical juxtaposition of the serious with the frivolous does two things. First, it violates decorum, or the fittingness of the subject, and, second, it creates humor with an unexpected and improper juxtaposition.

=== Subsequent evolution ===
Since Pope's day, the term "bathos", perhaps because of confusion with "pathos", has been used for art forms, and sometimes events, where something is so pathetic as to be humorous.

When artists consciously mix the very serious with the very trivial, the effect is of surreal humour and the absurd. However, when an artist is unconscious of the juxtaposition (e.g., when a film maker means for a man in a gorilla suit with a diving helmet to be frightening), the result is bathos.

Arguably, some forms of kitsch (notably the replication of serious or sublime subjects in a trivial context, like tea-towels with prints of DaVinci's Last Supper on them or hand guns that are actually cigarette lighters) express bathos in the concrete arts.

A tolerant but detached enjoyment of the aesthetic characteristics that are inherent in naïve, unconscious and honest bathos is an element of the camp sensibility, as first analyzed by Susan Sontag, in a 1964 essay "Notes on camp".

=== 17th and 18th centuries ===
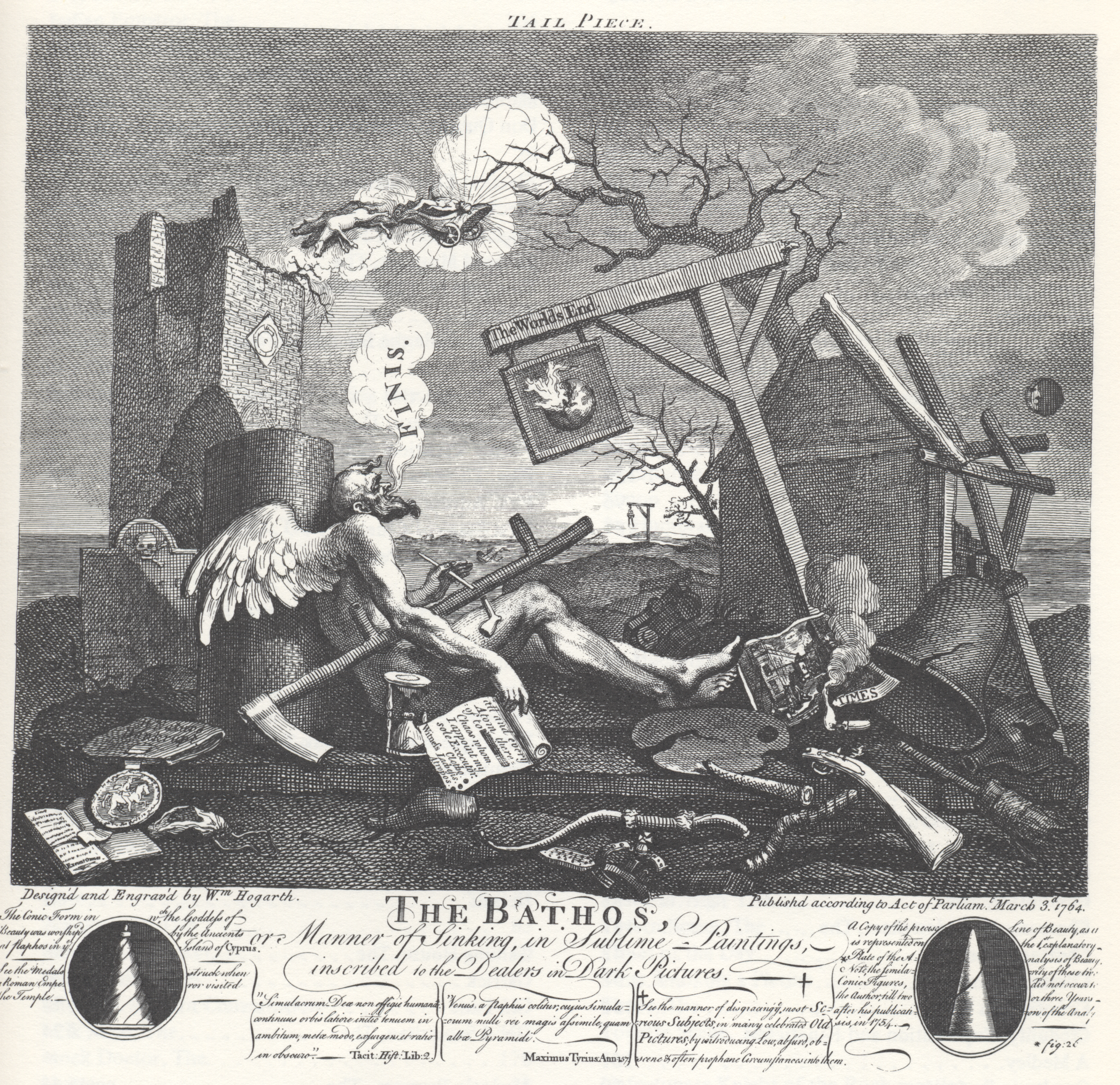
Hogarth's The Bathos

Bathos as Pope described it may be found in a grandly rising thought that punctures itself: Pope offers one "Master of a Show in Smithfield, who wrote in large Letters, over the Picture of his Elephant:

"This is the greatest Elephant in the World, except Himself."

Several decades before Pope coined the term, John Dryden had described one of the breath-taking and magically extravagant settings for his Restoration spectacular, Albion and Albanius (1684–85):

"The cave of Proteus rises out of the sea, it consists of several arches of rock work, adorned with mother of pearl, coral, and abundance of shells of various kinds. Through the arches is seen the sea, and parts of Dover pier."

Pope himself employed this type of figure intentionally for humor in his mock-heroic Rape of the Lock, where a lady would be upset at the death of a lover "or lapdog". Søren Kierkegaard, in The Sickness Unto Death, did the same thing, when he suggested that the "self" is easy to lose and that the loss of "an arm, a leg, a dog, or a wife" would be more grievous. When intended, this is a form of satire or the literary figure of undercutting. When the context demands a lofty, serious, or grand interpretation, however, the effect is bathos.

In 1764, William Hogarth published his last engraving, The Bathos, or the Manner of Sinking in Sublime Paintings inscribed to Dealers in Dark Pictures, depicting Father Time lying exhausted in a scene of destruction, parodying the fashion at that time for "sublime" works of art, and satirising criticisms made of Hogarth's own works. It may also be seen as a vanitas or memento mori, foreshadowing Hogarth's death six months later. Headed Tail Piece, this was intended as the tailpiece for a bound edition of Hogarth's engravings.

== See also ==
- Anti-climax
- Black comedy (gallows humor)

== Bibliography ==
- Pope, Alexander (2006) [1727]. "Peri Bathous". In Pat Rogers (ed.). The Major Works. Oxford: Oxford University Press. pp. 195–238. ISBN 978-0-19-920361-1. OCLC 317742832.
