= Alain de Boismenu =

French Roman Catholic prelate (1870–1953)

Venerable Alain de Boismenu MSC
- Vicar Apostolic Emeritus of Papua
- Church: Roman Catholic Church
- Appointed: 1908
- Term ended: 18 January 1945
- Predecessor: Louis-André Navarre
- Successor: André Sorin
- Other post: Titular Archbishop of Claudiopolis in Honoriade (1945-53)
- Previous posts: Coadjutor Vicar Apostolic of New Guinea (1899-1908); Titular Bishop of Gabala (1899-1945)

Orders
- Ordination: 10 February 1895 by Jean-Pierre Boyer
- Consecration: 18 March 1900 by Benedetto Lorenzelli

Personal details
- Born: Alain-Marie Guynot de Boismenu; 27 December 1870 Saint-Malo, Ille-et-Vilaine, France
- Died: 5 November 1953 (aged 82) Kubuna, Kairuku-Hiri, Papua New Guinea
- Motto: Ut cognoscant te

Sainthood
- Attributes: Episcopal attire
- Patronage: Handmaids of the Lord

Alain Marie Guynot de Boismenu (27 December 1870 – 5 November 1953) was a French Roman Catholic prelate who served as the Vicar Apostolic of Papua from 1908 until his retirement in 1945; he was a professed member of the Missionaries of the Sacred Heart and the founder of the Handmaids of the Lord. He studied under the De La Salle Brothers before beginning his religious formation in Belgium where he did his studies for the priesthood. He served for a brief period as a teacher before being sent in 1897 to Papua New Guinea to aid in the missions there; he also served the ailing apostolic vicar and was soon after made his coadjutor with the right of succession. His stewardship of the apostolic vicariate saw the number of missions and catechists increase and his tenure also saw the establishment of new schools and a training center for catechists.

The beatification process for de Bousmeu launched in 1984 and he became titled as a Servant of God. He later became titled as venerable in 2014 after Pope Francis confirmed he lived a life of heroic virtue.

== Life ==
=== Education and priesthood ===
Alain Marie Guynot de Boismenu was born in France on 27 December 1870 in Saint-Malo to François Célestin Guynot de Boismenu (1821–1884) and Augustine Marie Desessarts (1831–11.1.1871) as the last of eleven children (eight males and three females); his parents were married on 23 May 1843. His siblings included his brother Eugène (1858-???) and his sisters Héloïse (1860–13.3.1923) and Louise (15.12.1863-???) His mother died just over a week following his birth on 11 January 1871 at which stage his oldest sister Augustine helped to raise him. He was noted in his childhood for being passionate but having a short temper which sometimes put him in conflict with his father and Augustine who he felt was sometimes too strict with him.

He was educated first in Saint-Malo. His initial education was spent under the De La Salle Brothers from 1876 while his high school education (1881–86) at the College of Saint-Malo was spent under the direction of diocesan priests. It was in high school that one of the priests spoke with him about the new religious congregation, the Missionaries of the Sacred Heart, that was sending missionaries to exotic locations to preach. This intrigued Boismenu and it served as the basis for his desire to join the missions. His confessor and spiritual director Barbot admired that congregation and recommended that he enter their apostolic school in Issoudun where he would arrive on 8 September 1886. Boismenu joined the Missionaries of the Sacred Heart in 1886 and was sent to Belgium for his novitiate at Antwerp where he also did theological and philosophical studies. He made his first vows on 4 October 1888 and his perpetual vows in 1891. His ecclesial studies spanned from 1888 until 1892 and he later served as a teacher from 1892 until his ordination to the priesthood in Bourges on 10 February 1895 (with Cardinal Jean-Pierre Boyer presiding). He celebrated his first Mass on 11 February. Boismenu also found Pope Leo XIII's Rerum Novarum to be insightful and inspiring due to the working conditions of the poor meshing with theological perspectives on Catholic social teaching.

The apostolic vicar for Papua New Guinea came to France looking for additional support for his work which led Boismenu voicing his desire to aid the vicar in the missions. But his superiors hesitated with this request due to Boismenu's frail nature. His superiors instead wanted someone a bit more robust since that was needed for the vigorous demands of the missions. It was during this time that he came into contact with the Bishop Henri Verjus whom he confided in of his desire to join the missions; this was something that in correspondence Verjus encouraged though advised Boismenu that it required great zeal and virtue. On 13 August 1897 he learnt from his Superior General Jules Chevalier that he was permitted to go to the missions in Papua New Guinea. On 8 September 1897 he left Genoa and in late October he arrived via ship in Sydney and from there moved to Papua New Guinea.

=== Episcopate ===
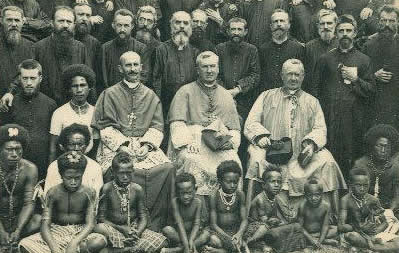
Boismenu (seated second from right) with missionaries and children c. 1892

Boismenu arrived at Yule Island on 25 January 1898 where he set himself on revitalizing the missions there while serving the ailing apostolic vicar with his pastoral duties. This saw Pope Leo XIII later name him as the vicar's coadjutor (and Titular Bishop of Gabala) on 10 June 1899 which meant that he would succeed the vicar upon his death or resignation. He learnt of this appointment as coadjutor while reading it in the mission paper while recovering from an attack that occurred on 26 May. He and others were attacked and beaten with the Mafulu tribesman pillaging their goods. This attack almost killed the group who managed to escape. Boismenu received his episcopal consecration in Paris at the Basilica of Montmartre on 18 March 1900 from the apostolic nuncio Benedetto Lorenzelli with Alexandre-Louis-Victor-Aimé le Roy and Louis Couppé serving as the principal co-consecrators. On 11 February 1898 he was named as the pro-vicar general for the vicariate. Boismenu was appointed as the apostolic vicar in January 1908 following his predecessor's resignation and he set out revitalizing and expanding the missions. He increased the number of catechists while he was the apostolic vicar and was a strong proponent of technical education. This desire to expand on technical education saw an increase in students during his time as apostolic vicar from 800 in 1898 (before his appointment) to 7000 in 1945 (when he retired). He also attended the Australasian Catholic Congress held in Melbourne in 1904 while coadjutor. Boismenu often suffered from tropical fevers due to the differences in weather which affected his frail constitution though rallied from illness each time. He would visit the missions either on foot or horseback in his objective of revitalizing and expanding them. Boismenu also proved himself a good diplomat during times of tribal conflicts.

In 1911 he attended his first ad limina visit to Rome to meet Pope Pius X. Back in his vicariate he set himself on establishing several orphanages in addition to schools and a training center for catechists. But financial support during World War I dwindled due to that support going to the war effort. In 1918 some women wished to become religious sisters which led to Boismenu founding the Handmaids of the Lord as a religious congregation for them. In 1925 he would start sending his sisters across the nation to other missions. His episcopal duties and his commitments to his sisters saw him recruit the services of Mother Marie-Thérèse Augustine Noblet (30.9.1889-15.1.1930) who came from France to oversee the formation and direction of the order while he went about his pastoral activities. On 29 September 1922 he issued a pastoral letter that sought to condemn superstitious practices that went against the Christian faith and which he believed acted against the Gospel. He likewise praised Pope Pius XI for his encyclical Rerum Ecclesiae and introduced it as "the supreme rule of the apostolate – the salvation of the greatest possible number of souls". In 1929 he would write to his missionaries and told them that "the pace is good, and is pleasing to God"; this was in reference to the growing expansion of evangelization efforts and greater catechetical formation. In 1930 he attended another ad limina visit to Pope Pius XI and would take the occasion to return to France to spend time with his relatives. It was on that occasion that a niece – Solange Bazin de Jessey – asked to follow him to his vicariate to dedicate herself to the missions. In 1931 she arrived and would succeed Noblet who had died not long prior.

He was a strong proponent of evangelization and often encouraged the missionaries to evangelize far from the different mission stations to other districts in order to further preach the Christian message. In 1924 he established a technical school on Yule Island after having set up a training center for catechists in 1916; this center flourished over time which led to there being 219 native catechists in 1933. In 1935 he also introduced the Carmelite nuns from France and the Philippines to found a contemplative convent there.

Boismenu was proud of the fact that in 1937 he was able to welcome the nation's first native priest Louis Vangheke who had hailed from the Meko tribe and who was ordained in Madagascar where Boismenu had sent him back in 1928 for his ecclesial studies. That priest would later receive consecration from Pope Paul VI in 1970 as the Bishop of Bereina. In May 1941 news spread fast that Boismenu's health had declined and that he would die soon. Boismenu himself was not disturbed that he could die but saw it as a surrender to God's will. But despite all odds he recovered and was able to resume his pastoral duties several months after having recuperated. The Pacific Front of World War II in 1942 saw the bishop give strict directives to prevent food shortages and stressed that spiritual guidance should be given to all combatants irrespective of their race or their side in the war.

=== Retirement and death ===
Boismenu retired on 18 January 1945 (and was made a titular archbishop for his service to the Church) due to frail constitution and Pope Pius XII lauded the retired prelate for his dedication and commitment to pastoral zeal. That same pope would praise Boismenu on the occasion of his sacerdotal golden jubilee and would praise the prelate for his work in building up the Papuan Church. He lived in eremitical retirement among the citrus trees in Kubuna where he remained until his death. In 1949 the French Government of Vincent Auriol awarded Boismenu with the Cross of the Legion of Honor at their New Year Honours which was put through the French ambassador Pierre Auge in recognition of the prelate's dedication to the welfare and advancement of the Papuan people.

During the visit of the Australian poet James McAuley to the mission at Yule Island in 1949, de Boismenu made a profound spiritual impression on him and contributed to his conversion to Catholicism.

Missionaries flocked to his bedside when it became known that Boismenu was close to death in 1953. He greeted them and spoke with them before giving them a long look and said to them in a loud voice: "Stand firm". Boismenu died some moments after this on 5 November 1953 at 3 pm just as Christ's death was being read to him. His remains were interred close to those of Noblet and later his niece in Kubuna mission.

== Beatification process ==
The beatification process launched on 14 November 1984 after the Congregation for the Causes of Saints issued the official nihil obstat ("no objections to the cause") and titled Boismenu as a Servant of God. The diocesan process was inaugurated in the Bereina diocese under its bishop Benedict To Varpin on 6 November 1984 and later concluded its work of collecting documentation and interrogatories on 21 March 1987. The Congregation's issued a decree on 18 November 1988 that validated the process as having complied with their regulations for conducting causes. The postulation would later submit the positio to the Congregation in 1996 for further assessment. Theologians issued a unanimous approval to the cause at their meeting held on 12 November 2013 while the C.C.S. cardinal and bishop members also approved the cause. It was that afternoon on 15 April that Pope Francis confirmed Boismenu to be venerable on the account of his life of heroic virtue. The postulator for this cause is the Jean-Louis Chassem SSCC.
