= Hadriana =

Hadriana may refer to:

- Bithynium, a town of ancient Bithynia
- Mopsuestia, a town of ancient Cilicia
