= Lycus (river of Bithynia) =

Ancient river of Bithynia

Lycus or Lykos (Greek: Λύκος) was an ancient river of Bithynia. It flowed in the east of Bithynia in a westerly direction, and emptied itself into the Black Sea (Pontus Euxinus) a little to the south of Heraclea Pontica, which was twenty stadia distant from it. The breadth of the river is stated to have been two plethra, and the plain near its mouth bore the name of Campus Lycaeus. (Scylax, p. 34; Orph. Argon. 720; Arrian, Peripl. p. 14; Anonym. Peripl. p. 3; Xenoph. Anab. vi. 2. § 3; Ov. Epist. ex Pont. x. 47; Memnon, ap. Phot. 51; Plin. vi. 1, who erroneously states that Heraclea was situated on (appositum) the river.)
