= Crobialus =

Crobialus or Krobialos (Ancient Greek: Κρωβίαλος) was a town on the Black Sea coast of ancient Paphlagonia, mentioned by Apollonius Rhodius, with Cromna and Cytorus; and Gaius Valerius Flaccus has the same name. Stephanus of Byzantium quotes the verse of Apollonius. We may assume that it was in the neighbourhood of Cromna and Cytorus. Strabo observes of the line in Homer's Iliad "Κρῶμνάν τ᾽ Αἰγιαλόν τε καὶ ὑψηλοὺς Ἐρυθίνους" that some persons write Κώβιαλον Kobalion, meaning 'at Cobialus', in place of Αἰγιαλόν Aigialon, meaning 'at Aegialus'. Crobialus and Cobialus seem to be the same place. However, Crobialus and Aegialus were distinct.

Its site is unlocated.
