= Dizlermezeci, Kurucaşile =

Dizlermezeci
- Village
- Location within Turkey
- Coordinates: 41°48′N 32°35′E
- Country: Turkey
- Province: Bartın
- District: Kurucaşile
- Population (2021): 271
- Time zone: UTC+3 (TRT)

Dizlermezeci is a village in the Kurucaşile District, Bartın Province, Turkey. Its population is 271 (2021).
