= Kömeç, Kurucaşile =

Kömeç
- Village
- Location within Turkey
- Country: Turkey
- Province: Bartın
- District: Kurucaşile
- Population (2021): 81
- Time zone: UTC+3 (TRT)

Kömeç is a village in the Kurucaşile District, Bartın Province, Turkey. Its population is 81 (2021).
