= Ziyaretköy, Kurucaşile =

Ziyaretköy
- Village
- Location within Turkey
- Coordinates: 41.7855°N 32.7423°E
- Country: Turkey
- Province: Bartın
- District: Kurucaşile
- Population (2021): 59
- Time zone: UTC+3 (TRT)

Ziyaretköy is a village in the Kurucaşile District, Bartın Province, Turkey. Its population is 59 (2021).
