= Uğurlu, Kurucaşile =

Uğurlu
- Village
- Location within Turkey
- Coordinates: 41°49′38″N 32°41′39″E
- Country: Turkey
- Province: Bartın
- District: Kurucaşile
- Population (2021): 193
- Time zone: UTC+3 (TRT)

Uğurlu is a village in the Kurucaşile District, Bartın Province, Turkey. Its population is 193 (2021).
