= 418 BC =

418 BC in various calendars
Gregorian calendar	418 BC; CDXVIII BC
Ab urbe condita	336
Ancient Egypt era	XXVII dynasty, 108
Pharaoh	Darius II of Persia, 6
Ancient Greek Olympiad (summer)	90th Olympiad, year 3
Assyrian calendar	4333
Balinese saka calendar	N/A
Bengali calendar	−1011 – −1010
Berber calendar	533
Buddhist calendar	127
Burmese calendar	−1055
Byzantine calendar	5091–5092
Chinese calendar	壬戌年 (Water Dog); 2280 or 2073 — to — 癸亥年 (Water Pig); 2281 or 2074
Coptic calendar	−701 – −700
Discordian calendar	749
Ethiopian calendar	−425 – −424
Hebrew calendar	3343–3344
- Hindu calendars
Vikram Samvat	−361 – −360
Shaka Samvat	N/A
Kali Yuga	2683–2684
Holocene calendar	9583
Iranian calendar	1039 BP – 1038 BP
Islamic calendar	1071 BH – 1070 BH
Javanese calendar	N/A
Julian calendar	N/A
Korean calendar	1916
Minguo calendar	2329 before ROC 民前2329年
Nanakshahi calendar	−1885
Thai solar calendar	125–126
Tibetan calendar	阳水狗年 (male Water-Dog) −291 or −672 or −1444 — to — 阴水猪年 (female Water-Pig) −290 or −671 or −1443

Year 418 BC was a year of the pre-Julian Roman calendar. At the time, it was known as the Year of the Tribunate of Fidenas, Axilla and Mugillanus (or, less frequently, year 336 Ab urbe condita). The denomination 418 BC for this year has been used since the early medieval period, when the Anno Domini calendar era became the prevalent method in Europe for naming years.

== Events ==
=== By place ===
==== Greece ====
- King Agis II of Sparta escapes being fined 10,000 drachmae and having his house razed for his failure to press his advantage by promising more successful outcomes in the future.
- The Battle of Mantinea is the largest land battle of the Peloponnesian War (with as many as 10,000 troops on each side). Sparta under King Agis II has a major victory over Argos (and its allies Athens, Ellis and Mantinea), which has broken its treaty with Sparta's King Agis II at the insistence of Alcibiades. Agis II's major victory makes amends with the Spartans for his earlier truce with Argos. The commander of the Athenian forces, Laches, is killed in the battle.
- Impressed with the Spartan victory, the inhabitants of Argos change their government from democracy to oligarchy and end their support for Athens in favour of an alliance with Sparta. Many of Argos' allies do the same. Athens becomes increasingly isolated.
- Alcibiades urges the Athenians to conquer Syracuse, subdue Sicily and Carthage and thus gain added forces that will enable them to finish the war against Sparta. His bold offensive plan wins the support of the Athenians.

== Births ==
- Epaminondas of Thebes, Theban general and statesman (d. 362 BC)
- Iphicrates, Athenian general (approximate date) (d. c. 353 BC)

== Deaths ==
- Laches, Athenian aristocrat and general (b. c. 475 BC)
