= Kirlikmüslimhoca, Kurucaşile =

Kirlikmüslimhoca
- Village
- Location within Turkey
- Country: Turkey
- Province: Bartın
- District: Kurucaşile
- Population (2021): 72
- Time zone: UTC+3 (TRT)

Kirlikmüslimhoca is a village in the Kurucaşile District, Bartın Province, Turkey. Its population is 72 (2021).
