= Kavaklı, Kurucaşile =

Kavaklı
- Village
- Location within Turkey
- Coordinates: 41.8052°N 32.6875°E
- Country: Turkey
- Province: Bartın
- District: Kurucaşile
- Population (2021): 117
- Time zone: UTC+3 (TRT)

Kavaklı is a village in the Kurucaşile District, Bartın Province, Turkey. Its population is 117 (2021).
