= Yule Island =

Island in Papua New Guinea

- Interactive map of Yule Island

Geography
- Location: Gulf of Papua
- Coordinates: 8°49′S 146°32′E

Administration
- Papua New Guinea
- Province: Central Province

Yule Island is a small island in Central Province, Papua New Guinea. It is located 160 km (99 mi) NW from Port Moresby, on the south coast of Papua New Guinea.

== History ==
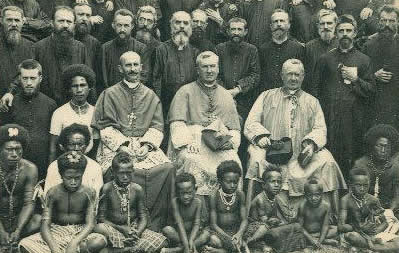
Missionaries and inhabitants after 1902

Yule Island was probably named after Charles Bampfield Yule, a Royal Navy officer who surveyed the area from 1842 to 1845. It was one of the first areas in Central Province to have contact with Europeans. The Catholic Missionaries of the Sacred Heart began a mission in 1885. The mission was successfully led from 1900 to 1908 by Bishop Henry Verius and from then until 1945 by Alain de Boismenu.

With the European missionaries came catechists from the Philippines, some of which married into the local population. Today, many inhabitants of Yule Island have distinct European and Filipino features.

The visit of Australian poet James McAuley to the mission at Yule Island in 1949 made a profound spiritual impression on him and contributed to his conversion to Catholicism.

== Fauna ==
Yule Island is surrounded by coral reefs.

Several spider species are endemic to this island, including:

- The jumping spider species Salticus perogaster and Plexippus brachypus
- Heteropoda cyanognatha and Pandercetes longipes (Sparassidae)
- Misumena arrogans and Stephanopis yulensis (Thomisidae)

The Early Pliocene Echinodermata fauna is rich and diverse, with 19 species known to occur in the Kairuku Formation. Nearly half of these species are also represented in northern Australia stocks, with the northern Great Barrier Reef only 600 km (370 mi) away.

== Notable people ==
- Susan Karike - designer of the flag of Papua New Guinea
- Louis-André Navarre - Missionary of the Sacred Heart and Archbishop, worked on the island and, following his death and burial in Townsville, was exhumed and reburied on the island
