= Kaleköy, Kurucaşile =

Kaleköy
- Village
- Location within Turkey
- Country: Turkey
- Province: Bartın
- District: Kurucaşile
- Population (2021): 183
- Time zone: UTC+3 (TRT)

Kaleköy is a village in the Kurucaşile District, Bartın Province, Turkey. Its population is 183 (2021).
