= The Climax =

The Climax may refer to:

- The Climax (1944 film), a horror film
- The Climax (1930 film), a thriller film
- The Climax (1967 film), a dark comedy film
- The Climax (illustration), a work of art by Aubrey Beardsley

== See also ==
- Climax (disambiguation)
