= Climax, Kentucky =

Unincorporated community in Kentucky, United States

Climax
- Unincorporated community
- Location within the state of Kentucky Climax (the United States)
- Coordinates: 37°28′11″N 84°13′30″W
- Country: United States
- State: Kentucky
- County: Rockcastle
- Elevation: 1,250 ft (380 m)
- Time zone: UTC-5 (Eastern (EST))
  - Summer (DST): UTC-4 (EST)
- ZIP codes: 40413
- GNIS feature ID: 511411

Climax, is an unincorporated community in Rockcastle County, Kentucky, United States. It is located on Kentucky Route 1912 north of Orlando. Climax has been noted for its unusual place name.
