= Alapınar, Kurucaşile =

Alapınar
- Village
- Location within Turkey
- Coordinates: 41.8234°N 32.6802°E
- Country: Turkey
- Province: Bartın
- District: Kurucaşile
- Population (2021): 103
- Time zone: UTC+3 (TRT)

Alapınar is a village in the Kurucaşile District, Bartın Province, Turkey. Its population is 103 (2021).
