= Danişment, Kurucaşile =

Danişment
- Village
- Location within Turkey
- Coordinates: 41.8199°N 32.6916°E
- Country: Turkey
- Province: Bartın
- District: Kurucaşile
- Population (2021): 111
- Time zone: UTC+3 (TRT)

Danişment is a village in the Kurucaşile District, Bartın Province, Turkey. Its population is 111 (2021).
