= İlyasgeçidi, Kurucaşile =

İlyasgeçidi
- Village
- Location in Turkey
- Coordinates: 41°48′N 32°44′E
- Country: Turkey
- Province: Bartın
- District: Kurucaşile
- Population (2021): 197
- Time zone: UTC+3 (TRT)

İlyasgeçidi is a village in the Kurucaşile District, Bartın Province, Turkey. Its population is 197 (2021).
