= Bithynium =

City in the interior of Bithynia

Coordinates: 40°44′22″N 31°36′42″E

Bithynium or Bithynion (Ancient Greek: Βιθύνιον) was an ancient city in Bithynia. Its site is occupied by the modern town of Bolu, Asiatic Turkey.

== History ==
Strabo describes Bithynium as lying above Tius and it possessed the country around Salone or Salon, which was a good feeding country for cattle, and noted for its cheese. It was the capital of Salone district. Bithynium was the birthplace of Antinous, the favourite of Hadrian, as Pausanias tells us, who adds that Bithynium is beyond, by which he probably means east of, the river Sangarius; and he adds that the remotest ancestors of the Bithynians are Arcadians and Mantineans. In this case a Greek colony settled here. Bithynium was afterwards called Claudiopolis (Greek: Κλαυδιόπολις), a name which it is conjectured it first had in the time of Tiberius; but it is strange that Pausanias does not mention this name. Dio Cassius speaks of it under the name of Bithynium and Claudiopolis also. It later bore the name Hadriana after the emperor. The names of Claudiopolis and Hadriana appear on coins minted here.

== Titular see ==
The town was Christianised early and became an archbishopric. An archbishop suffered martyrdom under Diocletian. No longer a residential see, it remains a titular see of the Roman Catholic Church under the name Claudiopolis in Honoriade. A former titular see under the name of Claudiopolis in Bithynia was suppressed.
