= Climax (Paphlagonia) =

Coordinates: 41°55′52″N 33°02′37″E

Climax or Klimax (Ancient Greek: Κλίμαξ) was a town on the Black Sea coast of ancient Paphlagonia between Cytorus and Cape Carambis (modern Kerembe Burnu). Marcian of Heraclea places it 50 stadia east of Crobialus. Ptolemy mentions it in his Galatia, and it is the first place after Cytorus which he mentions on this coast. It flourished during Roman and Byzantine eras.

Its site is located near Kazallı in Asiatic Turkey.
