= Demirci, Kurucaşile =

Demirci
- Village
- Location within Turkey
- Coordinates: 41.8252°N 32.7169°E
- Country: Turkey
- Province: Bartın
- District: Kurucaşile
- Population (2021): 49
- Time zone: UTC+3 (TRT)

Demirci is a village in the Kurucaşile District, Bartın Province, Turkey. Its population is 49 (2021).
