= Çayaltı, Kurucaşile =

Çayaltı
- Village
- Location within Turkey
- Coordinates: 41.8143°N 32.6677°E
- Country: Turkey
- Province: Bartın
- District: Kurucaşile
- Population (2021): 110
- Time zone: UTC+3 (TRT)

Çayaltı is a village in the Kurucaşile District, Bartın Province, Turkey. Its population is 110 (2021).
