= Hacıköy, Kurucaşile =

Hacıköy
- Village
- Location within Turkey
- Coordinates: 41.8327°N 32.7252°E
- Country: Turkey
- Province: Bartın
- District: Kurucaşile
- Population (2021): 82
- Time zone: UTC+3 (TRT)

Hacıköy is a village in the Kurucaşile District, Bartın Province, Turkey. Its population is 82 (2021).
