= Ömerler, Kurucaşile =

Ömerler
- Village
- Location within Turkey
- Coordinates: 41.8233°N 32.6685°E
- Country: Turkey
- Province: Bartın
- District: Kurucaşile
- Population (2021): 44
- Time zone: UTC+3 (TRT)

Ömerler is a village in the Kurucaşile District, Bartın Province, Turkey. Its population is 44 (2021).
