= Anti-climax =

Anti-climax or anticlimax (that is, the opposite of climax in its various meanings) may refer to:

- Anticlimax (narrative), a literary element
- Anticlimax (figure of speech), a rhetorical device
- Anticlimax (gastropod), a genus of sea snails
- Anticlimax: A Feminist Perspective on the Sexual Revolution, a 1990 book by Sheila Jeffreys
