= Paşalılar, Kurucaşile =

Paşalılar
- Village
- Location within Turkey
- Coordinates: 41°47′N 32°37′E
- Country: Turkey
- Province: Bartın
- District: Kurucaşile
- Population (2021): 275
- Time zone: UTC+3 (TRT)

Paşalılar is a village in the Kurucaşile District, Bartın Province, Turkey. Its population is 275 (2021).
