= Kapısuyu, Kurucaşile =

Kapısuyu
- Village
- Location within Turkey
- Coordinates: 41°50′40″N 32°45′1″E
- Country: Turkey
- Province: Bartın
- District: Kurucaşile
- Population (2021): 106
- Time zone: UTC+3 (TRT)

Kapısuyu is a village in the Kurucaşile District, Bartın Province, Turkey. Its population is 106 (2021).
