= Curunlu, Kurucaşile =

Curunlu
- Village
- Location within Turkey
- Coordinates: 41°50′N 32°39′E
- Country: Turkey
- Province: Bartın
- District: Kurucaşile
- Population (2021): 86
- Time zone: UTC+3 (TRT)

Curunlu is a village in the Kurucaşile District, Bartın Province, Turkey. Its population is 86 (2021).
