= Honorias =

Roman province from c. 380 to 600s

Provincia Honorias Ὁνωριάς ἐπαρχία Ονωριάδος
- Province of the Diocese of the East, Byzantine Empire
- c. 380–7th century
- Province of Honorias, c. 400 AD
- Capital: Claudiopolis
- Historical era: Late Antiquity
  - division of the Roman Empire: c. 380
  - Disestablished: 7th century
- Today part of: Turkey

Honorias (Greek: Ὁνωριάς) was a late Roman province encompassing parts of Bithynia and Paphlagonia in Asia Minor (modern Asian Turkey).

Its capital was Claudiopolis (modern Bolu), and its governor held the modest rank of praeses.

== History ==
The province was established under Theodosius I and named after his younger son Honorius. It formed part of the Diocese of Pontus, bordering with Bithynia in the west, Galatia Prima in the south and Paphlagonia in the east.

In the administrative reforms of Emperor Justinian I, the province was united with that of Paphlagonia and formed a new province of Paphlagonia, under a governor styled praetor Iustinianus.

Aside from the capital Claudiopolis, the major cities and episcopal seats of the province listed in the Synecdemus were Prusias and Tium.
