= Roman Catholic Diocese of Gabala =

The Titular Archbishopric of Gabala, formerly the Diocese of Gabala, is a titular archbishopric of the Roman Catholic Church named for its former see, the city of Jableh, in present-day Syria.

== Greek bishopric ==
No later than the 4th century, Gabala became a bishopric in the Roman province of Syria Prima, suffragan of the Archdiocese of Seleucia Pieria. Later it was raised to a Byzantine autocephalous Archbishopric, remaining within the sway of the original Patriarchate of Antioch, apparently until the Muslims conquered all Syria. Holders of the bishopric included:

- Zoilus (recorded in 325)
- Severus (circa 347)
- Domninus (in 381)
- Severianus (early 5th century)
- Maras
- Pietro/Peter (first mention 451 - last 458)
- Giovanni/John (in 536)
- Romanus (in 553)
- Germanus

== Latin bishopric ==
When the Crusaders conquered Gabala, it became a Latin bishopric in the Principality of Antioch, one of the Crusader States, until its capture by Saladin in 1189 during the Third Crusade, apparently under the Latin Patriarchate of Antioch. Holders of the see included:

- William/Guglielmo (recorded in 1115)
- Hugo/Ugo (first mention 1136 - last 1144)
- V. (in 1179)
- Radulfo (in 1261)
- Gualterio di Calabria, Dominican Order (O.P.) (12 July 1264 - ?)

== Latin titular see ==
No later than the 16th century the diocese was nominally restored as Latin Titular Bishopric of Gabala. It has had the following incumbents, of the episcopal (lowest) rank:

- Juan Martín (1513.11.04 – ?) as Auxiliary Bishop of Urgell (Spain) (1513.11.04 – ?)
- Alfonso de Villasancta, Friars Minor (O.F.M.) (1526.02.21 – ?) as Auxiliary Bishop of Urgell (Spain) (1526.02.21 – ?)
- Bertrand Reydellet, Paris Foreign Missions Society (M.E.P.) (1762.07.27 – death 1780.07.27) first as Coadjutor Vicar Apostolic of Western Tonking (Vietnam; now Metropolitan Archdiocese of Hà Nôi) (1762.07.27 – 1764.10.19), then succeeding as Apostolic Vicar of Western Tonking (1764.10.19 – 1780.07.27)
- Viktor von der heiligen Maria Schwaiger, Teresian Carmelites (O.C.D.) (1787.11.09 – death 1793.05.31) as Apostolic Vicar of Great Mogul (British East India; now Metropolitan Archdiocese of Bombay) (1787.11.09 – 1793.05.31)
- James Duggan (1857.01.09 – 1859.01.21) as Auxiliary Bishop of Archdiocese of Saint Louis (USA) (1857.01.09 – 1859.01.21); later Bishop of Chicago (USA) (1859.01.21 – retired 1880.09.10), died 1999
- Patrick Dorrian (1860.06.23 – 1865.07.13) as Coadjutor Bishop of Down and Connor (Northern Ireland, UK) (1860.06.23 – 1865.07.13); later succeeded as Bishop of Down and Connor (1865.07.13 – death 1885.11.03)
- Jules Lepley (孟), M.E.P. (1871.12.22 – death 1886.09.24) as Apostolic Vicar of Southern Szechwan 南四川 (imperial China; now Diocese of Suifu) (1871.12.22 – 1886.03.06)
- Jacobus Glazer (1887.09.04 – death 1898?) Auxiliary Bishop of Diocese of Przemyśl (Poland) (1887.09.04 – 1898?)
- Alain Guynot de Boismenu, Sacred Heart Missionaries ( M.S.C.) (later Archbishop) (1899.05.23 – 1945.01.18) first as Coadjutor Vicar Apostolic of New Guinea (Papua New Guinea) (1899.05.23 – 1908.01), succeeding as Vicar Apostolic of New Guinea (1908.01 – 1922.11.14) and restyled first Vicar Apostolic of Papua (Papua New Guinea) (1922.11.14 – 1946); later 'promoted' on emeritate as Titular Archbishop of Claudiopolis in Honoriade (1945.01.18 – death 1953.11.05)

Around 1932 it was promoted as Latin Titular Archbishopric of Gabala. It has had the following incumbents, mostly of the archiepiscopal (intermediary) rank with an exception of Episcopal (lowest) rank:

- Ignazio Mobarak (1952.01.20 – 1958.05.19)
- Vivian Anthony Dyer (1959.04.25 – 1960.08.12)
- Gérard-Paul-Louis-Marie de Milleville, Holy Ghost Fathers (C.S.Sp.) (1962.03.10 – 2007.01.12)
- Ricardo Lingan Baccay (2007.02.23 – 2016.02.20)
- Archbishop-elect Santiago De Wit Guzmán (born Spain) (2017.03.21 – ...), as papal diplomat : Apostolic Nuncio (ambassador) to Central African Republic (2017.03.21 – present)

== See also ==
- List of Catholic dioceses in Syria
