= Meydan, Kurucaşile =

Meydan
- Village
- Location within Turkey
- Coordinates: 41.8147°N 32.5995°E
- Country: Turkey
- Province: Bartın
- District: Kurucaşile
- Population (2021): 173
- Time zone: UTC+3 (TRT)

Meydan is a village in the Kurucaşile District, Bartın Province, Turkey. Its population is 173 (2021).
