= Chion of Heraclea =

4th-century BC Greek philosopher

Chion (Greek: Χίων; fl. 4th century BC) was the son of Matris, a noble citizen of Heraclea, city on the coast of Bithynia in Asia Minor, and was a disciple of Plato. Together with Leon, Euxenon, and other young men from noble families, he helped assassinate Clearchus, the tyrant of Heraclea (353 BC). Most of the conspirators were killed by the tyrant's body guards, others were put to death later, after being tortured. Rule of the city passed to Clearchus' brother, Satyrus, who is generally considered to have been a worse tyrant than Clearchus.

Seventeen surviving letters are ascribed to Chion, but they are no doubt spurious and may have been written by one of the later Platonists whose intention was to write an epistolary novel based on Chion's life. It has been very difficult to date them, but they are generally presumed to have been written in the 1st or 2nd century of our era. Some scholars are more cautious and prefer the 4th century. They were first printed in Greek in the Aldine collection of Greek Letters (Venice, 1499), then in Greek and Latin, in the 1606 reprint of that collection. The first separate edition was by Johannes Caselius in 1583 at Rostock. There was also a Latin translation published in the same volume with a Latin version of the fourth book of Xenophon's Cyropaedia by the same editor and printer the following year. An expanded edition of the Greek text, based on a new recension of some manuscripts in the Medicean collection, with notes and indices, was published by J. T. Coberus (Leipzig & Dresden, 1765). Johann Conrad Orelli produced an edition in the same volume as his edition of Memnon (Leipzig, 1816), which historian Philip Smith still considered the best in 1867. It contains the Greek text, the Latin version of Caselius, the introduction by Andreas Gottlieb Hoffmann, the preface of Coberus, and the notes of Coberus, Hoffmann, and Orelli.

The letters were first translated into English by I. Düring (Gothenburg, 1951), and into French by Pierre-Louis Malosse (Salerno, 2004).
