= Louis-André Navarre =

French Catholic priest

Archbishop Louis-André Navarre
- Vicar Apostolic Emeritus of New Guinea
- Installed: May 1889
- Term ended: January 1908
- Predecessor: New creation
- Successor: Alain de Boismenu

Orders
- Ordination: 27 May 1872
- Consecration: 30 November 1887

Personal details
- Born: Louis-André Navarre; 3 February 1836 Auxerre, France
- Died: 16 January 1912 (aged 75) Townsville, Australia
- Denomination: Catholic

Louis-André Navarre (3 February 1836 - 16 January 1912) was a French Catholic priest active in the Pacific. A member of the Missionaries of the Sacred Heart, he served as Vicar Apostolic of New Guinea from 1889 to 1908. He was also the Archbishop of Cyrrhus, a titular appointment.

== Religious life ==
Navarre was consecrated on 30 November 1887.

== Later life ==
Navarre resigned his duties in 1908 as he had become blind, but continued to live on Yule Island. He died on 16 January 1912 at the Townsville General Hospital in Queensland, Australia. He was taken ashore after falling ill on a voyage from New Guinea to Sydney.

His requiem mass was held at the Sacred Heart Cathedral in Townsville on Thursday 18 January 1912. He was buried in the West End Cemetery in Townsville. Permission was granted on 1 August 1925 to exhume his body which was then re-buried on Yule Island on 22 September 1925.
