= Ovatekkeönü, Kurucaşile =

Ovatekkeönü
- Village
- Location within Turkey
- Coordinates: 41°50′N 32°41′E
- Country: Turkey
- Province: Bartın
- District: Kurucaşile
- Population (2021): 119
- Time zone: UTC+3 (TRT)

Ovatekkeönü is a village in the Kurucaşile District, Bartın Province, Turkey. Its population is 119 (2021).
