= Karaman, Kurucaşile =

Karaman
- Village
- Location within Turkey
- Coordinates: 41.8230°N 32.6220°E
- Country: Turkey
- Province: Bartın
- District: Kurucaşile
- Population (2021): 365
- Time zone: UTC+3 (TRT)

Karaman is a village in the Kurucaşile District, Bartın Province, Turkey. Its population is 365 (2021).
