= Aydoğmuş, Kurucaşile =

Aydoğmuş
- Village
- Location within Turkey
- Coordinates: 41.7968°N 32.6712°E
- Country: Turkey
- Province: Bartın
- District: Kurucaşile
- Population (2021): 176
- Time zone: UTC+3 (TRT)

Aydoğmuş is a village in the Kurucaşile District, Bartın Province, Turkey. Its population is 176 (2021).
