= Kanatlı, Kurucaşile =

Kanatlı
- Village
- Location within Turkey
- Coordinates: 41°48′54″N 32°35′25″E
- Country: Turkey
- Province: Bartın
- District: Kurucaşile
- Population (2021): 127
- Time zone: UTC+3 (TRT)

Kanatlı is a village in the Kurucaşile District, Bartın Province, Turkey. Its population is 127 (2021).
