= Herodorus =

Herodorus of Heraclea (Ancient Greek: Ἡρόδωρος ὁ Ἡρακλεώτης) was a native of Heraclea Pontica who wrote a history on Heracles around 400 BC. Plutarch references Herodorus several times in his account of Theseus in Parallel Lives. He is among the authors (= FGrHist 31) whose fragments were collected in Felix Jacoby's Fragmente der griechischen Historiker.
