= Kurucaşile District =

District of Bartın Province, Turkey

- District
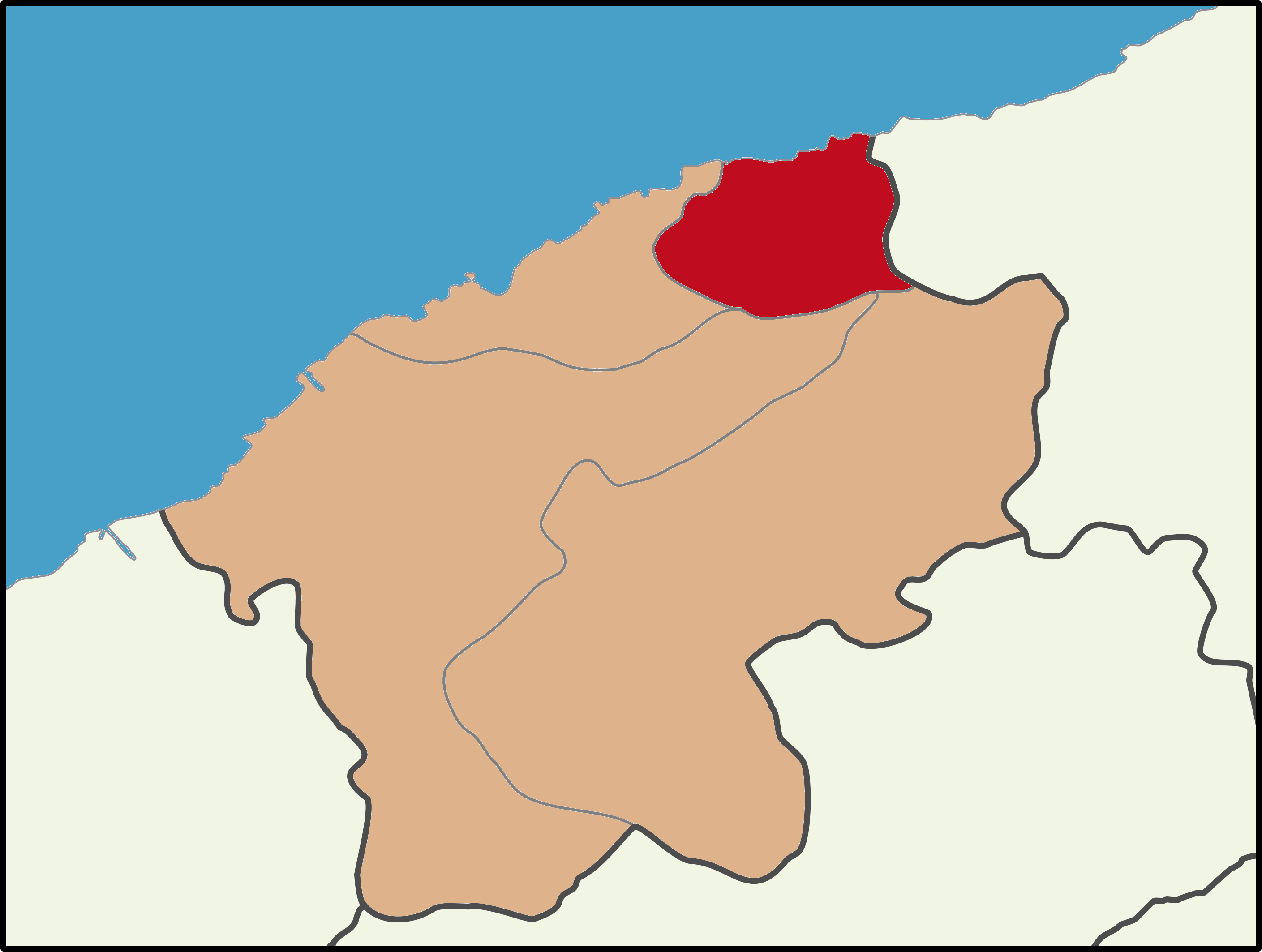
- Map showing Kurucaşile District in Bartın Province

- Location in Turkey
- Coordinates: 41°50′N 32°43′E
- Country: Turkey
- Province: Bartın
- Seat: Kurucaşile

Government
  - Kaymakam: Muhammed Ebrar Evsen
- Area: 152 km^{2} (59 sq mi)
- Population (2021): 6,424
  - Density: 42/km^{2} (110/sq mi)
- Time zone: UTC+3 (TRT)
- Website: www.kurucasile.gov.tr

Kurucaşile District is a district of the Bartın Province of Turkey. Its seat is the town of Kurucaşile. Its area is 152 km^{2}, and its population is 6,424 (2021).

== Composition ==
There is one municipality in Kurucaşile District:

- Kurucaşile

There are 28 villages in Kurucaşile District:

- Alapınar
- Aydoğmuş
- Başköy
- Çayaltı
- Curunlu
- Danişment
- Demirci
- Dizlermezeci
- Elvanlar
- Hacıköy
- Hisarköy
- İlyasgeçidi
- Kaleköy
- Kanatlı
- Kapısuyu
- Karaman
- Kavaklı
- Kirlikmüslimhoca
- Kömeç
- Meydan
- Ömerler
- Ovatekkeönü
- Paşalılar
- Sarıderesi
- Şeyhler
- Uğurlu
- Yeniköy
- Ziyaretköy
