= Yeniköy, Kurucaşile =

Yeniköy
- Village
- Location within Turkey
- Country: Turkey
- Province: Bartın
- District: Kurucaşile
- Population ((2025)): 121
- Time zone: UTC+3 (TRT)

Yeniköy is a village in the Kurucaşile District, Bartın Province, Turkey. Its population is 89 (2021).
