= Şeyhler, Kurucaşile =

Şeyhler
- Village
- Location within Turkey
- Coordinates: 41°50′2″N 32°42′41″E
- Country: Turkey
- Province: Bartın
- District: Kurucaşile
- Population (2021): 45
- Time zone: UTC+3 (TRT)

Şeyhler is a village in the Kurucaşile District, Bartın Province, Turkey. Its population is 45 (2021).
