= Elvanlar, Kurucaşile =

Elvanlar
- Village
- Location within Turkey
- Coordinates: 41.7855°N 32.5805°E
- Country: Turkey
- Province: Bartın
- District: Kurucaşile
- Population (2021): 199
- Time zone: UTC+3 (TRT)

Elvanlar is a village in the Kurucaşile District, Bartın Province, Turkey. Its population is 199 (2021).
