= Sarıderesi, Kurucaşile =

Sarıderesi
- Village
- Location within Turkey
- Coordinates: 41°45′N 32°35′E
- Country: Turkey
- Province: Bartın
- District: Kurucaşile
- Population (2021): 281
- Time zone: UTC+3 (TRT)

Sarıderesi is a village in the Kurucaşile District, Bartın Province, Turkey. Its population is 281 (2021).
