= Başköy, Kurucaşile =

Başköy
- Village
- Location within Turkey
- Coordinates: 41.7700°N 32.6988°E
- Country: Turkey
- Province: Bartın
- District: Kurucaşile
- Population (2021): 338
- Time zone: UTC+3 (TRT)

Başköy is a village in the Kurucaşile District, Bartın Province, Turkey. Its population is 338 (2021).
