= Hisarköy, Kurucaşile =

Hisarköy
- Village
- Location within Turkey
- Coordinates: 41.8268°N 32.6607°E
- Country: Turkey
- Province: Bartın
- District: Kurucaşile
- Population (2021): 276
- Time zone: UTC+3 (TRT)

Hisarköy is a village in the Kurucaşile District, Bartın Province, Turkey. Its population is 276 (2021).
