= Memnon of Heraclea =

1st century Greek historian

Memnon of Heraclea (/ˈmɛmnən/; Ancient Greek: Mέμνων, gen.: Μέμνονος; fl. c. 1st century) was a Greek historical writer, probably a native of Heraclea Pontica. He described the history of that city in a large work, known only through the Excerpta of Photius (I of Constantinople), and describing especially the various tyrants who had at times ruled Heraclea.

Memnon's history encompassed an unknown number of books, but Photius had read the ninth through the sixteenth, and made a tolerably copious abstract of that portion. The first eight books he had not read, and he speaks of other books after the sixteenth. The ninth book begins with an account of the tyrant Clearchus, the disciple of Plato and Isocrates. The thirteenth book contains a long account of the rise of Rome. The last event mentioned in the sixteenth book was the death of Brithagoras, who was sent by the Heracleians as ambassador to Julius Caesar, after the latter had obtained the supreme power (48 BC).

From this Gerardus Vossius supposes that the work was written about the time of Caesar Augustus at the beginning of the 1st century AD; in the judgment of Orelli, not later than the time of Hadrian or the Antonines, in the middle of the 2nd century; the Oxford Classical Dictionary thinks the 2nd century AD likely. It is, of course, impossible to fix the date with any precision, as we do not know at all down to what time the entire work was carried. The style of Memnon, according to Photius, was clear and simple, and the words well chosen. The Excerpta of Photius, however, contain numerous examples of rare and poetical expressions, as well as a few which indicate the decline of the Greek language. These Excerpta of Photius were first published separately, together with the remains of Ctesias and Agatharchides by Henry Estienne, Paris, 1557. The best edition is that by Johann Conrad Orelli, Leipzig, 1816, containing, together with the remains of Memnon, a few fragments of other writers on Heraclea.

Memnon's history is valuable as a continuous account of nearly all the Hellenistic period, albeit a compressed one from a local vantage point. It is also valuable as the only reasonably complete example of the Greek historical genre of local history.
