= Tium =

Ancient settlement on the south coast of the Black Sea

Coordinates: 41°33′41″N 32°01′23″E

Tium (Ancient Greek: Τῖον) was an ancient settlement, also known as Phileios (Ancient Greek: Φίλειος), on the south coast of the Black Sea at the mouth of the river Billaeus in present-day Turkey. Ancient writers variously assigned it to ancient Paphlagonia or Bithynia.

Apart from Tium, Latinized forms of the name are Teium, Tieium and Tius, corresponding to the Greek names Τεῖον (Teion), Τιεῖον (Tieion), Τῖον (Tion) and Τῖος (Tios).

== History ==
The town was founded as a colony from the Greek city of Miletus in the 7th century BCE. According to Strabo, the town was only remarkable as the birthplace of Philetaerus, founder of the royal dynasty of Pergamon. At the beginning of the 3rd century BCE, Amastrine (Amastris), the niece of the last Persian king Darius III, who was the wife of Dionysius, tyrant of Heracleia, and after his death the wife of Lysimachus caused a synoecism of Sesamus, Cytorus, Cromna, all towns mentioned in the Iliad, and Tium after her separation from Lysimachus, to form the new community of Amastris. Tium, says Strabo, soon detached itself from the community, but the rest kept together, probably in 282 BCE, recovered its autonomous status.

Tium was part of Kingdom of Bithynia, which on the death of King Nicomedes IV in 74 BC became a Roman province. Emperor Theodosius I (379–392) incorporated it into Honorias, when he carved out this new province from portions of Bithynia and Paphlagonia and named it after his younger son Honorius. In 535, the Emperor Justinian united Honorias with Paphlagonia in a decree that expressly mentioned Tium among the cities that were affected. There are coins of Tium as late as the reign of Gallienus, on which the ethnic name appears as Τιανοί, Τεῖοι, and Τειανοί.

Its site is located near Filyos (formerly Hisarönü), Asiatic Turkey.

== Bishopric ==
Tium was a bishopric from at least the 4th century, a suffragan of Claudiopolis, capital and metropolitan see of Honorias.

Le Quien (Oriens christianus, I, 575) mentions among its bishops:

- Apragmonius at the First Council of Ephesus in 431;
- Andrew in 518;
- Eugenius in 536;
- Longinus at the Sixth General Council in 681;
- Michael at the Seventh General Council in 787;
- Constantine, at the Eighth General Council in 869, and author of an account of the transfer of the relics of St. Euphemia of Chalcedon (Acta Sanctorum, September, V, 274-83).

This see figures in all the Notitiae episcopatuum.
