= Clearchus of Heraclea =

Greek ruler of Heraclea (c. 401 – 353 BC)

Clearchus (Ancient Greek: Kλέαρχoς, romanized: Klearkhos; c. 401 BC – 353 BC; also spelled Cleärchus or Cleärch) was a citizen of Heraclea on the Euxine (Black Sea) who was recalled from exile by the oligarchy of that city to aid them in quelling the growing discontent and demands of the people. According to Justin, Clearchus reached an agreement with Mithridates of Cius to betray the city to him on the condition that Clearchus would hold the city for Mithridates as governor. But, Clearchus then came to the conclusion that he could make himself master of the city without the aid of Mithridates. So he not only broke his agreement with the Mithridates, but also captured him and compelled him to pay a large sum for his release.

Having deserted the side of the oligarchs, Clearchus put himself forward as the man of the people, and in around 365 BC obtained from the city's population the command of a body of mercenaries, and, having got rid of the oligarchs by murder and banishment, raised himself to the tyranny. He was said to have used his power as badly and with as much cruelty as he had gained it and, as a sign of his arrogance, assumed publicly the attributes of Zeus, and gave the name of Keraunos (i.e. "thunderer") to one of his sons.

Due to his tyrannical conduct, Clearchus lived in constant fear of assassination, against which he guarded in the strictest way. But, in spite of his precautions, he was killed by Chion and Leon in 353 BC, after a reign of twelve years. Chion was said to have been a pupil of both Plato and Isocrates, the latter of whom asserted that, while he was with him, he was one of the gentlest and most benevolent of men.

Clearchus was succeeded by his brother Satyrus, who was said to be an even more vicious ruler who "made himself tyrant in the same way". Heraclea would continue to be ruled by tyrants.

== See also ==
- Amastrine
- Dionysius of Heraclea
- Timotheus of Heraclea
- Oxyathres of Heraclea
