= Climax (beetle) =

Scientific classification
- Domain: Eukaryota
- Kingdom: Animalia
- Phylum: Arthropoda
- Class: Insecta
- Order: Coleoptera
- Suborder: Adephaga
- Family: Carabidae
- Tribe: Clivinini
- Subtribe: Clivinina
- Genus: Climax; Putzeys, 1863

Genus of beetles

Climax (/ˈklaɪ.mæks/) is a genus of beetles in the family Carabidae, found in Brazil.

== Species ==
These three species belong to the genus Climax:

- Climax fissilabris Putzeys, 1861
- Climax foveilabris (Putzeys, 1861)
- Climax serratipennis Putzeys, 1866
