= Cromna (Corinthia) =

Coordinates: 37°54′14″N 22°57′07″E

Cromna or Kromna (Ancient Greek: Κρώμνα), was a town in ancient Corinthia.

Its site (discovered in 1960) is located near the modern Kato Examilia. Archaeological excavations have revealed tombs with pottery dating from the 7th century BCE.

In the Hellenistic area a wall was built across the isthmus that ran through the settlement and indeed the fact that a gate was located in the wall at this point may explain the growth of the settlement. The grave that was uncovered of an Agathon seemingly from Kromna is plausibly the grave of a defender of the Peloponnese from northern invaders and hence from Kromna in Arkadia.
