= Prince Arthur =

Prince Arthur may refer to:

- Arthur I, Duke of Brittany (1187-1203), nephew and possible heir of Richard I of England
- Arthur, Prince of Wales (1486–1502), eldest son of Henry VII of England
- Prince Arthur, Duke of Connaught and Strathearn (1850–1942), third son of Queen Victoria of the United Kingdom
- Prince Arthur of Connaught (1883–1938), the only son of Prince Arthur, Duke of Connaught and Strathearn
- King Arthur also features as "Prince Arthur" in some works, as in Richard Blackmore's epic Prince Arthur, an Heroick Poem in X Books and Edmund Spenser's The Faerie Queene
- PS Prince Arthur, a paddle steamer in service 1867–1885
- Prince Arthur (HBC vessel), operated by the Hudson's Bay Company from 1854–1864, see Hudson's Bay Company vessels
