= Climax, Oregon =

Unincorporated community in the state of Oregon, United States

Coordinates: 42.295°N 122.620°W

Climax is a community located at the end of the road traversing the Antelope Creek canyon, sitting below Grizzly Peak, in Jackson County, Oregon.
