= John Arbuthnot =

Scottish physician, satirist and polymath in London (1667–1735)

John Arbuthnot FRS
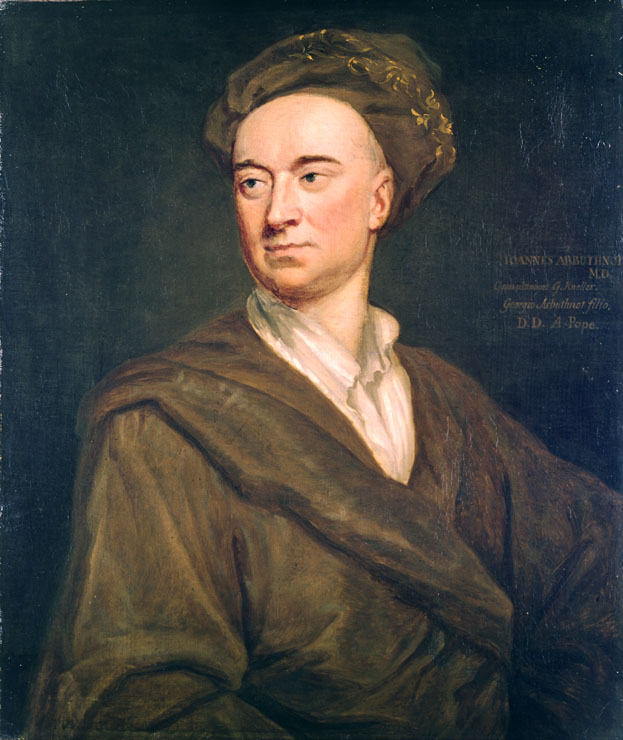
- Portrait of John Arbuthnot by Godfrey Kneller
- Born: 1667 (baptised on 29 April); Kincardineshire, Scotland
- Died: 27 February 1735 (aged 67); London, England
- Education: Marischal College, University of Aberdeen
- Occupations: Physician, satirist, polymath

John Arbuthnot (baptised 29 April 1667 – 27 February 1735), often known simply as Dr Arbuthnot, was a Scottish physician, satirist and polymath in London. He is best remembered for his contributions to mathematics, his membership in the Scriblerus Club (where he inspired Jonathan Swift's Gulliver's Travels book III and Alexander Pope's Peri Bathous, Or the Art of Sinking in Poetry, Memoirs of Martin Scriblerus, and possibly The Dunciad), and for inventing the figure of John Bull.

== Biography ==
In his mid-life, Arbuthnot, complaining of the work of Edmund Curll, among others, who commissioned and invented a biography as soon as an author died, said, "Biography is one of the new terrors of death," and so a biography of Arbuthnot is made difficult by his own reluctance to leave records. Alexander Pope noted to Joseph Spence that Arbuthnot allowed his infant children to play with, and even burn, his writings. Throughout his professional life, Arbuthnot exhibited a strong humility and social conviviality, and his friends often complained that he did not take sufficient credit for his own work.

Arbuthnot was born in Arbuthnot, Kincardineshire, on the north-eastern coast of Scotland, son of Margaret (née Lammie) and Rev Alexander Arbuthnot, an Episcopalian priest. He may have graduated with an arts degree from Marischal College in 1685. Where Arbuthnot's brothers took part in Jacobite causes in 1689, he remained with his father. These brothers included Robert, who fled after fighting for King James VII in 1689 and became a banker in Rouen and half-brother George, who fled to France and became a wine merchant. However, when William and Mary came to the throne and the Scottish and English parliaments required all ministers to swear allegiance to them as king and queen, Arbuthnot's father did not comply. As a non-juror, he was removed from his church, and John was there to take care of affairs when, in 1691, his father died.

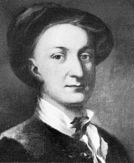
Arbuthnot, from a painting by Godfrey Kneller

Arbuthnot went to London in 1691, where he is supposed to have supported himself by teaching mathematics (which had been his formal course of study). He lodged with William Pate, whom Swift knew and called a "bel esprit". He published Of the Laws of Chance in 1692, translated from Christiaan Huygens's De ratiociniis in ludo aleae. This was the first work on probability published in English. The work, which applied the field of probability to common games, was a success, and Arbuthnot became the private tutor of one Edward Jeffreys, son of Jeffrey Jeffreys, an MP. He remained Jeffreys's tutor when the latter attended University College, Oxford in 1694, and he there met the variety of scholars then teaching mathematics and medicine, including Dr John Radcliffe, Isaac Newton, and Samuel Pepys. However, Arbuthnot lacked the money to be a full-time student and was already well educated, although informally. He went to the University of St Andrews and enrolled as a doctoral student in medicine on 11 September 1696. The same day he defended seven theses on medicine and was awarded the doctorate.

He first wrote satire in 1697, when he answered Dr John Woodward's An essay towards a natural history of the earth and terrestrial bodies, especially minerals... with An Examination of Dr Woodward's Account &c. He poked fun at the arrogance of the work and Woodward's misguided, Aristotelian insistence that what is theoretically attractive must be actually true. In 1701, Arbuthnot wrote another mathematical work, An essay on the usefulness of mathematical learning, in a letter from a gentleman in the city to his friend in Oxford. The work was moderately successful, and Arbuthnot praises mathematics as a method of freeing the mind from superstition.

In 1702, he was at Epsom when Prince George of Denmark, husband of Queen Anne fell ill. According to tradition, Arbuthnot treated the prince successfully. According to tradition again, this treatment earned him an invitation to court. Also around 1702, he married Margaret, whose maiden name is possibly Wemyss. Although there are no baptismal records, it seems that his first son, George (named in honour of the prince), was born in 1703. He was elected to be a Fellow of the Royal Society in 1704. Also thanks to the Queen's presence, he was made an MD at Cambridge University on 16 April 1705.

Arbuthnot was an amiable individual, and Swift said that the only fault an enemy could lay upon him was a slight waddle in his walk. His conviviality and his royal connections made him an important figure in the Royal Society. In 1705, Arbuthnot became physician extraordinary to Queen Anne, and at the same time was put on the board trying to publish the Historia coelestius. Newton and Edmund Halley wanted it published immediately, to support their work on orbits, while John Flamsteed, the Royal Astronomer whose observations they were, wanted to keep the data secret until he had perfected it. The result was that Arbuthnot used his leverage as friend and physician to Prince George, whose money was paying for the publication, to force Flamsteed to allow it out, albeit with serious errors, in 1712. Also as a scholar, Arbuthnot took up an interest in antiquities and published Tables of Grecian, Roman, and Jewish measures, weights and coins; reduced to the English standard in 1705, 1707, 1709, and, expanded with a preface (which indicated that his second son, Charles, was born in 1705), in 1727 and 1747.

Although Arbuthnot was not a Jacobite after the fashion of his brothers, he was a Tory, for national and familial reasons. Anne was advised (and many said controlled) by Sarah Churchill, Duchess of Marlborough, who was a champion of Whig causes. In 1706, the Duchess of Marlborough fell out with Anne—a schism which the Tories were pleased to encourage. The marriage of lady-in-waiting Abigail Hill to Samuel Masham, which was the first overt sign of Anne's displeasure with Sarah Churchill, took place in Arbuthnot's apartments at St James's Palace. The reasons for the choice of apartment and the degree of involvement of Arbuthnot in either the love match or Anne's estrangement, are not clear. As a Scotsman, Arbuthnot served the crown by writing A sermon preach'd to the people at the Mercat Cross of Edinborough on the subject of the union. Ecclesiastes, Chapter 10, Verse 27. The work was designed to persuade Scots to accept the Act of Union. When the Act passed, Arbuthnot was made a fellow of the Royal College of Physicians of Edinburgh. He was also made a physician in ordinary to the Queen, which made him part of the royal household.

Arbuthnot returned to mathematics in 1710 with An argument for Divine Providence, taken from the constant regularity observed in the births of both sexes (linked below) in the Royal Society's Philosophical Transactions. In this paper, Arbuthnot examined birth records in London for each of the 82 years from 1629 to 1710 and the human sex ratio at birth: in every year, the number of males born in London exceeded the number of females. If the probability of male and female birth were equal, the probability of the observed outcome would be 1/2^{82}. This vanishingly small number led Arbuthnot to believe that this phenomenon was not due to chance, but to divine providence: "From whence it follows, that it is Art, not Chance, that governs." This paper was a landmark in the history of statistics; in modern terms he performed statistical hypothesis testing, computing the p-value (via a sign test), interpreted it as statistical significance, and rejected the null hypothesis. This is credited as "… the first use of significance tests …", the first example of reasoning about statistical significance and moral certainty, and "… perhaps the first published report of a nonparametric test …".

== As a Scriblerian ==
In 1710, Jonathan Swift moved to London. With Robert Harley, 1st Earl of Oxford (who was then the secretary of the treasury and not a peer), he produced the Tory Examiner, and Arbuthnot made their acquaintance and began to provide "hints" to them. These "hints" were ideas for essays, satirical gambits, and facts, rather than secrets of any sort. From 1711 to 1713, Arbuthnot and Swift formed "The Brothers' Club," though Arbuthnot characteristically gave away his ideas and even his writings, never seeking credit for them.

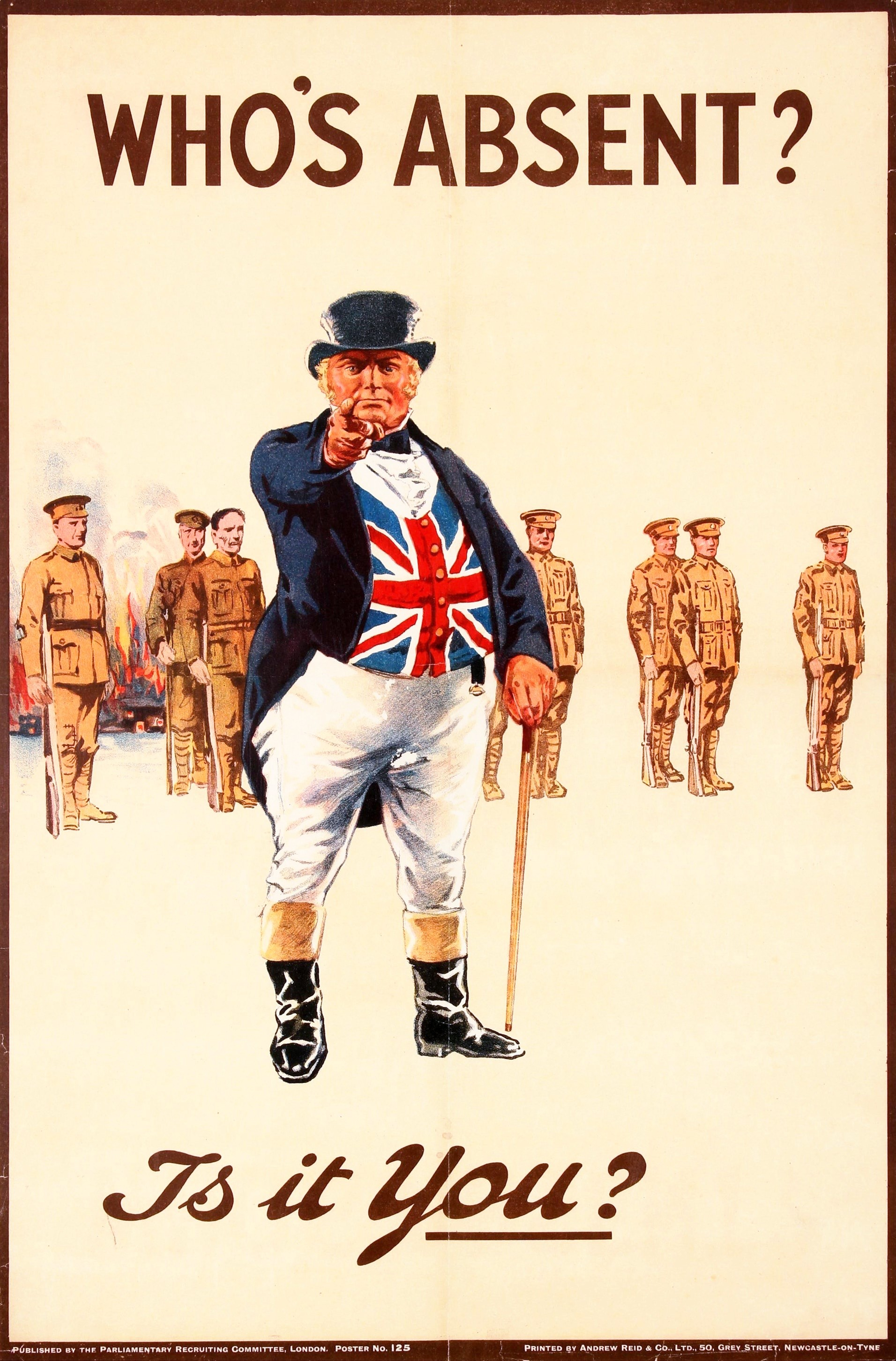
John Bull in his World War I iteration. Arbuthnot's character became an enduring symbol for the United Kingdom.

In 1712, Arbuthnot and Swift both attempted to aid the Tory government of Harley and Henry St. John in their efforts to end the War of the Spanish Succession. The war had profited John and Sarah Churchill, and the Tory ministry sought to end it by withdrawing from all England's alliances and negotiating directly with France. Swift wrote The Conduct of the Allies, and Arbuthnot wrote a series of five pamphlets featuring John Bull. The first of these, Law Is a Bottomless Pit (1712), introduced a simple allegory to explain the war. John Bull (England) is suing Louis Baboon (i.e. Louis Bourbon, or Louis XIV of France) over the estate of the dead Lord Strutt (Charles II of Spain). Bull's lawyer is the one who really enjoys the suit, and he is Humphrey Hocus (Marlborough). Bull has a sister named Peg (Scotland). The pamphlets are Swiftian in their satire, in that they make all of the characters hopelessly flawed and comic and none of their endeavour worth pursuing (which was Arbuthnot's intent, as he sought to make the war an object of scorn), but it is filled with homespun humour, a common touch, and a sympathy for the figures that is distinctly non-Swiftian.

In 1713, Arbuthnot continued his political satire with Proposals for printing a very curious discourse... a treatise of the art of political lying, with an abstract of the first volume. As with other works that Arbuthnot encouraged, this systemizes a rhetoric of bad thinking and writing. He proposes to teach people to lie well. Similar lists and systems are in Alexander Pope's Peri Bathos and John Gay and Pope's Memoirs of Martinus Scriblerus. Also in 1713, Arbuthnot was made a physician of Chelsea Hospital, which provided him with a house. It was this house that hosted the meetings of the Scriblerus Club, which had as its members Harley (now Earl of Oxford), St. John (now Viscount Bolingbroke), Pope, Gay, Swift, and Thomas Parnell. According to all the members of the club, Arbuthnot was the one who contributed the most in ideas, and he was the only source they could draw upon when satirizing the sciences, and his was the idea for the Memoirs of Martinus Scriblerus, a pedantic man who, like Arbuthnot's earlier opponent, Dr Woodward, would read three or four lines of Classical literature and deduce a universal (and absurd) truth from them.

The club met for only a year, as Queen Anne died in July 1714, and the club met for the last time in November of that year. When Anne died, she had no will. Consequently, all her servants were left without positions and entirely at the mercy of the next administration – an administration that was chosen by the enemies of Arbuthnot and the other Scriblerans. When George I came to the throne, Arbuthnot lost all of his royal appointments and houses, but he still had a vigorous medical practice. He lived at "the second door from the left in Dover Street" in Piccadilly.

== Life under the Hanoverians ==
In 1717, Arbuthnot contributed somewhat to Pope and Gay's play, Three Hours after Marriage, which ran for seven nights. He was a friend to George Frederic Handel and appointed director to the Royal Academy of Music (1719) from the start in 1719 till 1729.

In 1719 he took part in a pamphlet war over the treatment of smallpox. In particular, he attacked Dr Woodward, who had again presented a dogmatic and, Arbuthnot thought, irrational opinion. In 1723, Arbuthnot was made one of the censors of the Royal College of Physicians, and as such he was one of the campaigners to inspect and improve the drugs sold by apothecaries in London. In 1723, the apothecaries sued the RCP, and Arbuthnot wrote Reasons humbly offered by the ... upholders (undertakers) against part of the bill for the better viewing, searching, and examining of drugs. The pamphlet suggested that the funeral directors of London might wish to sue the Royal College of Physicians as well to ensure that drug safety remained poor. In 1727, he was made an elect of the Royal College of Physicians.

In 1726 and 1727, Jonathan Swift and Alexander Pope reunited at Arbuthnot's house during visits, and Swift showed Arbuthnot the manuscript of Gulliver's Travels ahead of time. The detailed parody of on-going Royal Society projects in book III of Gulliver's Travels likely came from "hints" from Arbuthnot. The visit also bore fruit in Pope's The Dunciad of 1729 (the second edition), where Arbuthnot probably wrote the "Virgilius restauratus" satirizing Richard Bentley.

Arbuthnot was guardian to Peter the Wild Boy on his first arrival in London.

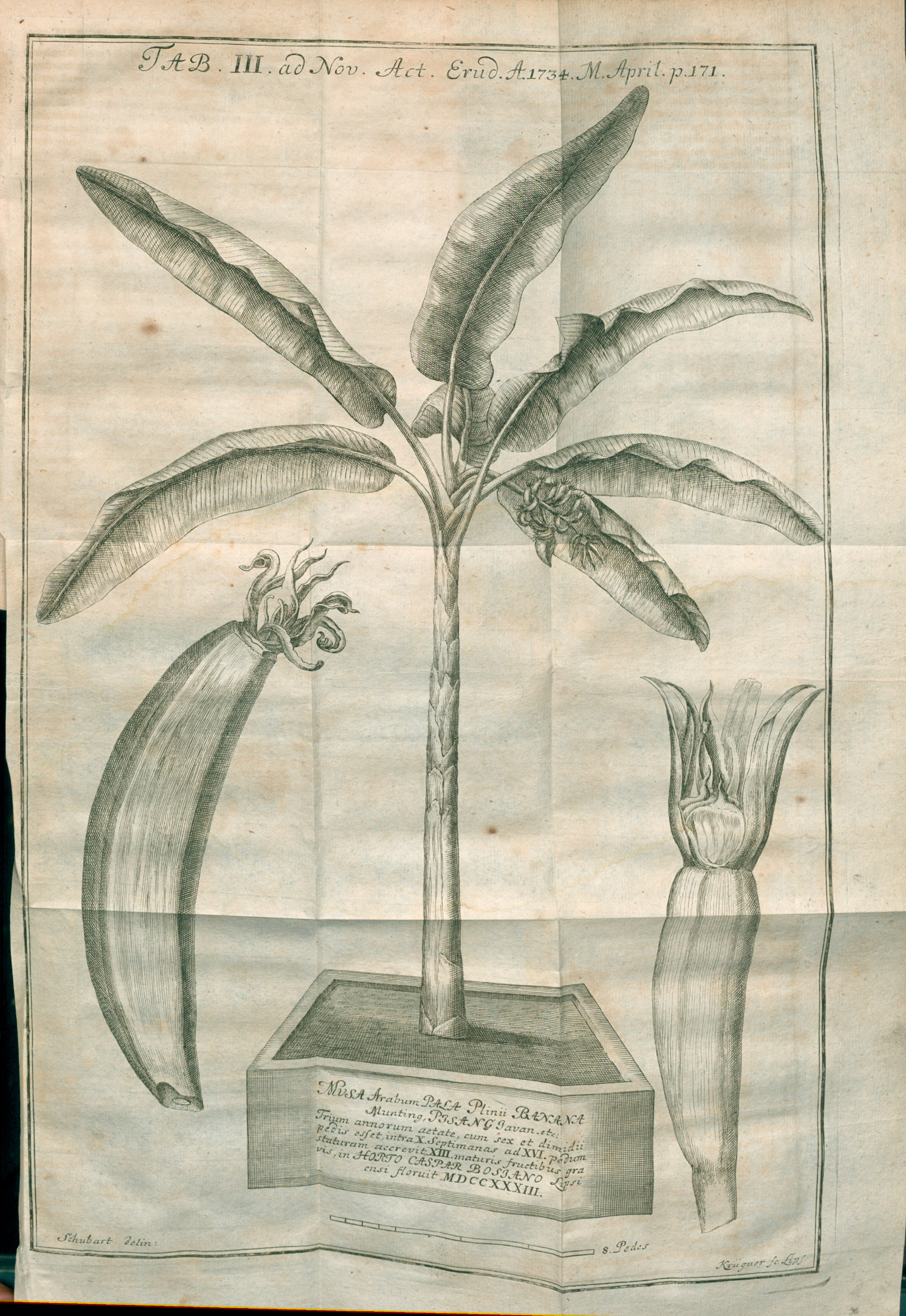
Illustration from Tentamen circa indolem alimentoru published in Acta Eruditorum, 1734

In 1730, Arbuthnot's wife died. The next year, he produced a work of popular medicine, An essay concerning the nature of aliments, and the choice of them, according to the different constitutions of human bodies. The book was quite popular, and a second edition, with advice on diet, came out the next year. It had four more full editions and translations into French and German. In 1733 he wrote another very popular work of medicine called An Essay Concerning the Effects of Air on Human Bodies. As with the former work, it went through multiple editions and translations. He argued that the air itself had to have enormous effects on the personality and persons of humanity, and he believed that the air of locations resulted in the characteristics of the people, as well as particular maladies. He advised his readers to ventilate sickrooms and to seek fresh air in cities. Although the idea that airs carried sickness was incorrect, the practical upshot of Arbuthnot's advice was efficacious, as crowded, poorly sanitized Augustan era cities had bad air and infectious air.

His son Charles, studying to be a divine at Christ Church, Oxford, died in 1731, the same year that the Swift and Pope Miscellanies, Volume the Third (which was the first volume) appeared. He contributed "An Essay of the Learned Martinus Scriblerus Concerning the Origine of the Sciences" to the volume.

In 1734, his health began to decline. He had kidney stones and asthma, and he was also overweight. On 17 July 1734, Arbuthnot wrote to Pope to tell him that he had a terminal illness. In a response dated 2 August, Pope indicates that he planned to write more satire, and on 25 August told Arbuthnot that he was going to address one of his epistles to him, later characterizing it as a memorial to their friendship. Arbuthnot died at his house in Cork Street, in London on 27 February 1735, eight weeks after the poem "Epistle to Dr Arbuthnot" was published. He is buried at St James's Church, Piccadilly.

== Literary significance ==
Arbuthnot was one of the founding members of the Scriblerus Club, and was regarded by the other wits of the group as the funniest, but he left fewer literary remains than the other members. His satires are written with an ease, a humanity, and an apparent sympathy. Swift and Arbuthnot had similar styles in language (both preferred direct sentences and clear vocabulary) with a feigned frenzy of lists and taxonomies, and sometimes their works are attributed to each other. The treatise on political lying, for example, has been attributed to Swift in the past, although it was definitely Arbuthnot's. Generally, Arbuthnot's writings are not as vicious or nihilistic as Swift's, but they attack the same targets and both refuse to hold up a set of positive norms for their readers.

Because of Arbuthnot's own insistence on not being recognized, it is difficult to speak definitively of his literary significance. Samuel Johnson thought highly of him as Boswell noted: "Talking of the eminent writers in Queen Anne's reign, he observed, 'I think Dr. Arbuthnott the first man among them. He was the most universal genius, being an excellent physician, a man of deep learning, and a man of much humour.'"

== Works ==
- John Arbuthnot (1710). "An argument for Divine Providence, taken from the constant regularity observed in the births of both sexes" (PDF). Philosophical Transactions of the Royal Society of London. 27 (325–336): 186–190. doi:10.1098/rstl.1710.0011. S2CID 186209819.
- John Arbuthnot (1712, published in 1727). The History of John Bull.
- John Arbuthnot (1722). Mr. Maitland’s account of inoculating the small-pox, London, printed for the author, by J. Downing. (Transcription in Eighteenth Century Collections Online).
- John Arbuthnot (1733). An essay concerning the effects of air on human bodies, London, printed for J. Tonson in the Strand. (Transcription in Eighteenth Century Collections Online).
- John Arbuthnot (1727). Tables of Ancient Coins, Weights and Measures. Explain'd and exemplify'd in several dissertations., London : printed for J. Tonson, 1727.

== Sources ==
- Anderson, William, John Arbuthnot, M.D., in The Scottish Nation, Edinburgh, 1867, vol.1, pps:146-151.
- Ross, Angus, John Arbuthnot in Matthew, H.C.G., and Brian Harrison (eds.), Oxford Dictionary of National Biography, vol. 2, 325–329. London: Oxford University Press, 2004.

Attribution

- Chambers, Robert; Thomson, Thomas Napier (1857). "Arbuthnot, John, M.D." . A Biographical Dictionary of Eminent Scotsmen . Vol. 1. Glasgow: Blackie and Son. pp. 68–73 – via Wikisource.
