= Climax (1965 film) =

- Directed by: Rolf Clemens
- Written by: Sten Rune Sterner
- Starring: Per Jansen; Rut Tellefsen
- Release date: 14 October 1965
- Running time: 94 minutes
- Country: Norway
- Language: Norwegian

Climax (Norwegian: Klimaks) is a 1965 Norwegian drama film directed by Rolf Clemens, starring Per Jansen and Rut Tellefsen. The film deals with the death of a man's mistress, and the love/hate relationship she had with his son.

== Plot ==
The film takes place in a remote house in the country, where a young boy lives alone with his father. The mother died in an accident or took her own life. The father's mistress comes to the house to live with the two. The main character is the boy, who does not want to have the woman in the house. He uses violence, as she does not allow herself to be intimidated. In the course of one day, the dramatic action reaches its climax.
