= Orlando, Kentucky =

Unincorporated community in Kentucky, United States

Orlando
- Unincorporated community
- Location within the state of Kentucky Orlando (the United States)
- Coordinates: 37°22′22″N 84°16′5″W
- Country: United States
- State: Kentucky
- County: Rockcastle
- Elevation: 919 ft (280 m)
- Time zone: UTC-5 (Eastern (EST))
  - Summer (DST): UTC-4 (EST)
- ZIP codes: 40460
- GNIS feature ID: 514376

Orlando is an unincorporated community in Rockcastle County, Kentucky, United States. It is located at the junction of Kentucky Route 1004 and Kentucky Route 1912. The CC Subdivision runs through Orlando.
