= Timotheus of Heraclea =

Tyrant of Heraclea (died 338 BC)

Timotheus of Heraclea (Ancient Greek: Τιμόθεος ὁ Ἡρακλειεύς, Timotheos; died 338 BC) was son of Clearchus, the tyrant of Heraclea on the Euxine (Black Sea). After the death of his father in 353 BC, he succeeded to the sovereignty, under the guardianship, at first, of his uncle Satyrus, and held the rule for fifteen years. There is extant a letter addressed to him by Isocrates, in which the rhetorician commends him for his good qualities, gives him some very common-place advice, and recommends to his notice a friend of his, named Autocrator, the bearer of the epistle.
