= Climax, Texas =

- Unincorporated community
- Location within Texas Location within the United States
- Coordinates: 33°12′17″N 96°26′59″W
- Country: United States
- State: Texas
- County: Collin
- Elevation: 554 ft (169 m)
- Time zone: UTC-6 (Central (CST))
  - Summer (DST): UTC-5 (CDT)
- GNIS feature ID: 1378132

Climax is an unincorporated community in Collin County, located in the U.S. state of Texas. According to the Handbook of Texas, the community had a population of 40 in 2000. It is located within the Dallas-Fort Worth Metroplex.

== History ==
William Warden was the first settler to the area in 1844, coming from Missouri. He received a land grant from Peter's Colony for 640 acres (260 ha) of land along the east fork of the Trinity River in 1850. He settled here with his family to start farming soon after. There were two gins, a grain elevator, a church, a hotel, and a general store in Climax in the mid-1890s. A post office was established at Climax in 1895 and remained in operation until 1901, after which mail was sent from Farmersville. The community has served as a retail point for local farmers for most of its history. It had a population of 40 from 1940 through 2000.

On June 29, 1974, a transport boiling liquid expanding vapor explosion occurred in Climax, resulting in 108 tons of vinyl chloride from rail being released into the air.

== Geography ==
Climax is located at the intersection of Farm to Market Roads 1377 and 2756, 5 mi (8.0 km) east of McKinney in central Collin County.

== Education ==
Climax had its own school in the mid-1890s. Today the community is served by the Princeton Independent School District. It is zoned for Leta Horn Smith Elementary School, Clark Middle School, and Princeton High School.
