= Oxyathres of Heraclea =

Tyrant of Heraclea (died 284 BC)

Oxyathres (Ancient Greek: Οξυάθρης; died 284 BC) was a son of Dionysius, tyrant of Heraclea and of Amastris, the daughter of the brother of Darius III Codomannus, also called Oxyathres. He succeeded, together with his brother Clearchus, to the sovereignty of Heraclea on the death of Dionysius, 306 BC, but the government was administered by Amastris during the minority of her two sons. Soon after the young men had attained to manhood and taken the direction of affairs into their own hands, they caused their mother to be put to death (284 BC); this act of matricide brought upon them the immediate vengeance of Lysimachus, who made himself master of Heraclea, and put both Clearchus and Oxyathres to death. According to Diodorus, they had reigned seventeen years; their death should be assigned to the year 284 BC.
