= Rhebas (river) =

Ancient river of Bithynia

Coordinates: 41°13′32″N 29°12′52″E

The Rhebas (Ancient Greek: Ῥήβας) was a very small river on the coast of ancient Bithynia, the length of which amounts only to a few miles (or km); it flows into the Euxine, near the entrance of the Bosporus, northeast of Chalcedon. This little river, which is otherwise of no importance, owes its celebrity to the story of the Argonauts. It also bore the names of Rhesaeus and Rhesus, the last of which seems to have arisen from a confusion with the Rhesus mentioned by Homer.

Its site is identified with the Riva Deresi in Asiatic Turkey.
