= Heraclea Pontica =

Ancient city on the coast of Bithynia

- Ἡράκλεια Ποντική
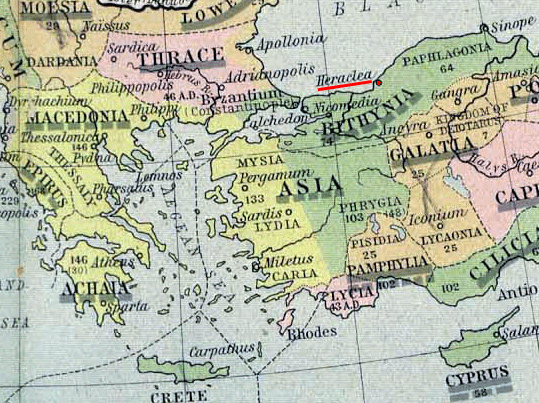
- Map indicating Heraclea Pontica (underlined in red) during the Roman expansion in 133 BC

- Location within Turkey
- 41°17′5″N 31°24′53″E
- Periods: Archaic Greece
- Location: Karadeniz Ereğli, Zonguldak Province, Turkey
- Region: Bithynia

History
- Built: Between 560–558 BC
- Built by: Colonists from Megara

Heraclea Pontica (/ˌhɛrəˈkliːə ˈpɒntɪkə/; Ancient Greek: Ἡράκλεια Ποντική, romanized: Hērákleia Pontikḗ; Attic Greek: [hɛːrákleːa pontikɛ́ː], Koine Greek: [(h)e̝ˈraklia pontiˈke̝]), known in Byzantine and later times as Pontoheraclea (Greek: Ποντοηράκλεια, romanized: Pontohērakleia), was an ancient city on the coast of Bithynia in Asia Minor, at the mouth of the river Lycus. The site is now the location of the modern city Karadeniz Ereğli, in the Zonguldak Province of Turkey.

== History ==
Heraclea Pontica was founded by the Greek city-state of Megara in approximately 560–558 BC and was named after Heracles who the Greeks believed entered the underworld at a cave on the adjoining Acherusian cape.

The colonists soon subjugated the native Mariandynians but agreed to terms that none of the latter, now helot-like serfs, be sold into slavery outside their homeland. Prospering from the rich, fertile adjacent lands and the sea-fisheries of its natural harbor, Heraclea soon extended its control along the coast as far east as Cytorus (Gideros, near Cide), eventually establishing Black Sea colonies of its own (Cytorus, Callatis and Chersonesus). It was the birthplace of the philosopher Heraclides Ponticus.

The prosperity of the city, rudely shaken by the Galatians and the Bithynians, was utterly destroyed in the Mithridatic Wars.

The Greek historical author Memnon of Heraclea (fl. 1st century AD) wrote a local history of Heraclea Pontica in at least sixteen books. The work has perished, but Photius's Bibliotheca preserves a compressed account of books 9–16, seemingly the only ones extant in his day. These books run from the rule of the tyrant Clearchus (c. 364–353 BC) to the later years of Julius Caesar (c. 40 BC) and contain many colorful accounts including the Bithynian introduction of the barbarian Gauls into Asia where they first allied themselves with the Heracleans and later turned violently against them.

Then, Heraclea Pontica was part of the (Eastern) Roman Empire for more than 1000 years. The Turks ravaged the area after the Battle of Mantzikert in 1071. David Komnenos, brother of the ruler of Trebizond Alexios I of Trebizond, took Heraclea Pontica in 1205 and made it capital of his domain, called Paphlagonia; he lost it in 1214 to Theodore I Laskaris, who made it a major frontier bulwark. The Genoese had a colony there after 1261. When the Turks conquered Paphlagonia in 1360, Genoa bought the city from the weakening Byzantine Empire. Heraclea developed as a trading centre of the Genoese, who settled there in large numbers. A ruined citadel on a height overlooking the town is a remnant of this period. The Italian name of the city was Pontarachia. The Genoese held the city until the Ottomans captured it after 1453.

== Ecclesiastical history ==
The city replaced Claudiopolis as metropolitanate in the late 13th century, during the reign of Andronikos II. After its fall in 1360, and its subsequent decline due to Turkoman raids and migrations, a synod in 1387 decreed that the metropolitanate of Heraclea Pontica be assumed by Amastris, for the following reason:

It is in no way just to leave without a metropolitan the remnant of the Christians captured by barbaric invasions in the most holy metropolitanate of Pontoheracleia. For such are in need of spiritual supervision and its consecration, since as human beings they are led astray by the deception of life and care little for the heavenly and immortal rewards. [...] Since it seems impossible for them to have a valid metropolitan, for the church had previously disintegrated and the ones there are not sufficient for his aid and support [...]

== Notable people ==
- Amastris, tyrant of Heraclea, niece to Persian King Darius III
- Bryson of Heraclea, mathematician and sophist
- Chamaeleon, philosopher
- Chion of Heraclea, a disciple of Plato who helped assassinate the tyrant Clearchus
- Clearchus of Heraclea, tyrant of Heraclea
- Diogenianus, a Greek grammarian
- Dionysius of Heraclea, tyrant of Heraclea
- Evagrius Ponticus, philosopher, monk, and ascetic
- Heraclides Ponticus, philosopher and astronomer, born in Heraclea
- Herodorus, mythographer, born in Heraclea.
- Marcian of Heraclea, geographer
- Memnon of Heraclea, historian
- Nicetas of Heraclea, Metropolitan of Heraclea
- Oxyathres of Heraclea, tyrant of Heraclea
- Promathidas of Heraclea, historian
- Spintharos Of Heraclea, poet
- Theodore Stratelates, Christian martyr saint
- Timotheus of Heraclea, son of Clearchus and succeeded him after his death
- Xenagoras (historian), historian

== See also ==
- List of ancient Greek cities
