= Cromnus =

Ancient city of Greece

Coordinates: 37°19′36″N 22°05′06″E

Cromnus or Kromnos (Ancient Greek: Κρῶμνος) or Cromna or Kromna (Κρῶμνα), or Cromi or Kromoi (Κρῶμοι), was a town of ancient Arcadia on the frontiers of Messenia, the inhabitants of which were removed to Megalopolis, on the foundation of the latter city in 371 BCE. Its territory is called Cromitis or Kromitis (Κρωμῖτις) by Pausanias. Cromnus was the site of a battle where the Arcadians defeated the forces of Sparta under Archidamus III in 364 BCE.

Its site is located near modern Paradeisia-Martiakos.
