= Cromna (Paphlagonia) =

Ancient city of Paphlagonia

Coordinates: 41°49′42″N 32°40′35″E

Cromna or Kromna (Ancient Greek: Κρῶμνα) was a town on the Paphlagonian coast, now in modern Turkey. It is mentioned by Homer in the Iliad. It was 60 stadia east of Erythini and 90 west of Cytorus. There are autonomous coins of Cromna.

Stephanus of Byzantium writes that it was named after Kromnos, the son of Lykaon.

The site of Cromna has been the subject of some disagreement among sources: Amasra and Kurucaşile both being suggested. However, modern scholars place its site near modern Tekeönü in Bartın Province.
