= Kurucaşile =

- Municipality
- Location within Turkey
- Coordinates: 41°50′44″N 32°43′07″E
- Country: Turkey
- Province: Bartın
- District: Kurucaşile

Government
  - Mayor: Uğur Güneş (CHP)
- Elevation: 30 m (98 ft)
- Population (2021): 2,097
- Time zone: UTC+3 (TRT)
- Postal code: 74500
- Climate: Cfb
- Website: www.kurucasile.bel.tr

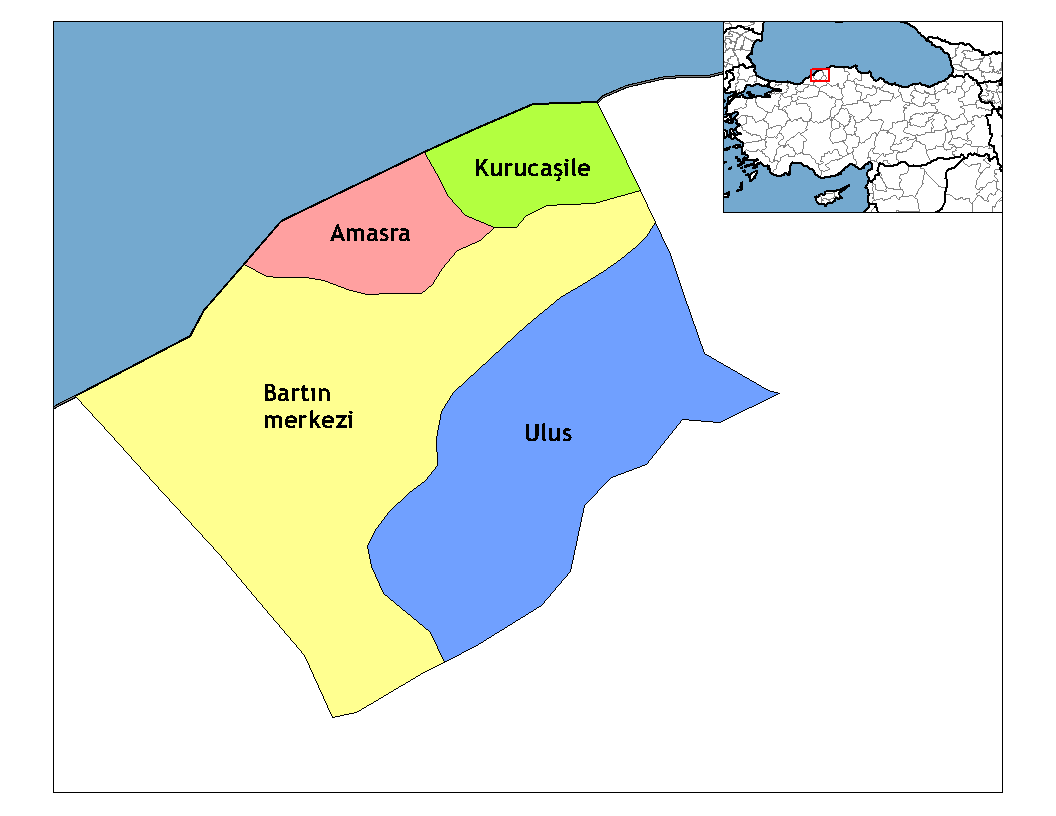

Kurucaşile is a town in Bartın Province in the Black Sea Region of Turkey. It is the seat of Kurucaşile District. Its population is 2,097 (2021). It lies on the Black Sea coast. The mayor is Uğur Güneş (CHP).

== Climate ==
Köppen-Geiger climate classification system classifies its climate as oceanic (Cfb).

Climate data for Kurucaşile
Month	Jan	Feb	Mar	Apr	May	Jun	Jul	Aug	Sep	Oct	Nov	Dec	Year
Mean daily maximum °C (°F)	9 (48)	10.3 (50.5)	12.7 (54.9)	17.1 (62.8)	21.3 (70.3)	25.3 (77.5)	27.5 (81.5)	27.5 (81.5)	24.6 (76.3)	19.7 (67.5)	15.4 (59.7)	11 (52)	18.5 (65.2)
Daily mean °C (°F)	5.1 (41.2)	6 (43)	8 (46)	12.1 (53.8)	16.2 (61.2)	19.7 (67.5)	21.9 (71.4)	21.8 (71.2)	18.8 (65.8)	14.6 (58.3)	10.7 (51.3)	7.1 (44.8)	13.5 (56.3)
Mean daily minimum °C (°F)	1.2 (34.2)	1.7 (35.1)	3.4 (38.1)	7.2 (45.0)	11.1 (52.0)	14.2 (57.6)	16.3 (61.3)	16.1 (61.0)	13 (55)	9.6 (49.3)	6.1 (43.0)	3.2 (37.8)	8.6 (47.4)
Average precipitation mm (inches)	91 (3.6)	66 (2.6)	58 (2.3)	53 (2.1)	49 (1.9)	52 (2.0)	51 (2.0)	64 (2.5)	63 (2.5)	90 (3.5)	101 (4.0)	111 (4.4)	849 (33.4)
Source: Climate-Data.org, altitude: 3m
