= Cytorus =

Ancient Greek city on the Black Sea

Coordinates: 41°51′34″N 32°51′29″E

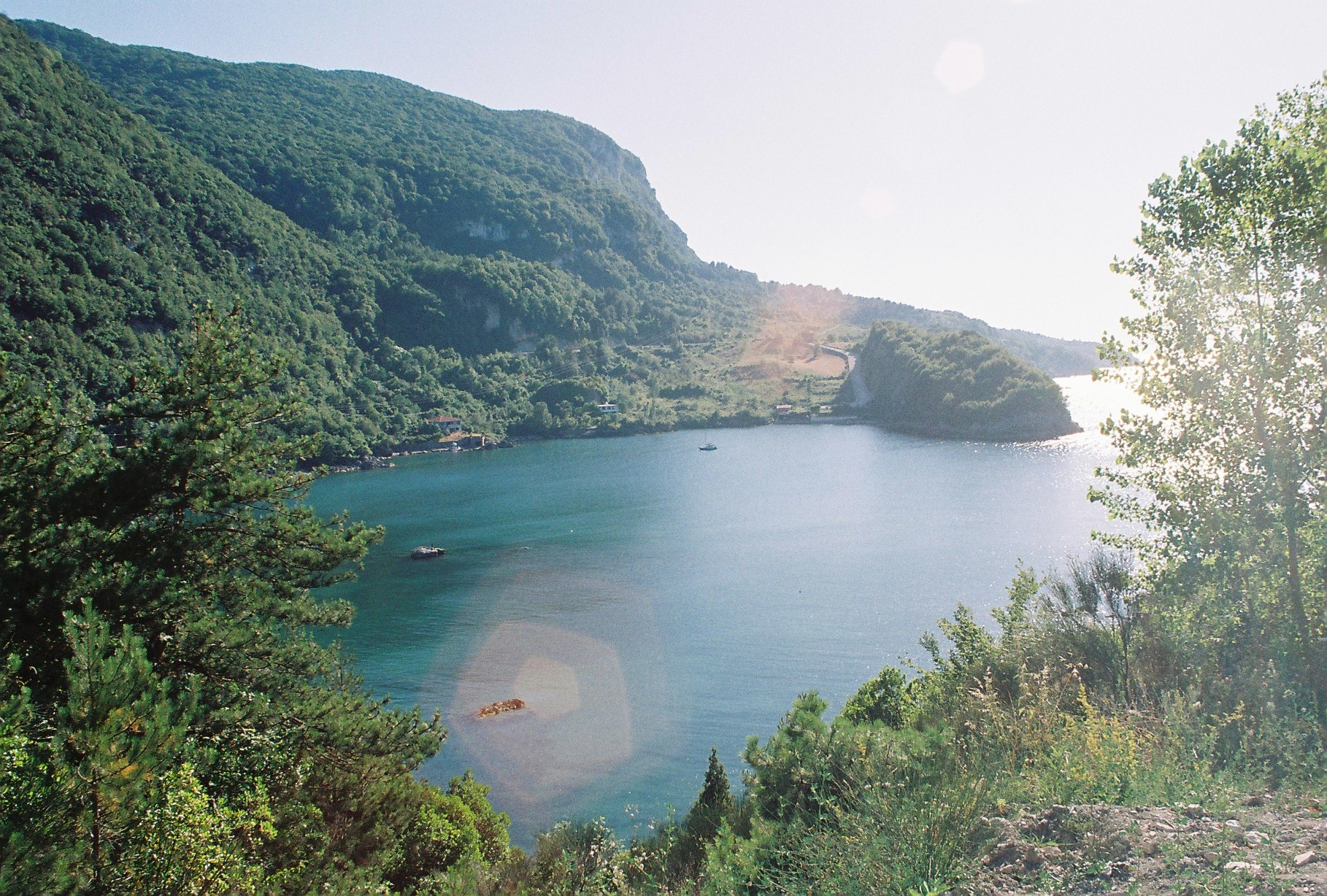
Gideros Bay

Cytorus (Greek Κύτωρος, Kytoros; also Cytorum, Κύτωρον, Kytoron and Κύτωρις) was an ancient Greek city on the northern coast of Asia Minor. Mentioned by Homer, Cytorus survives in the name of Gideros, which is both

- a bay of the Black Sea and
- the adjacent neighbourhood (mahalle) of the village of Kalafat in the district (ilçe) of Cide in the Kastamonu Province of Turkey.

Gideros is 12 km west of the town of Cide, and 15 km east of Kurucaşile. Possibly the name of Cide itself is derived from Cytorus.

Its mythical founder was Cytiorus, son of Phrixus, according to Ephorus and Stephanus of Byzantium. In giving the Trojan battle order in Book 2 of the Iliad, Homer mentions Cytorus and Sesamon as Paphlagonian settlements, along with others around the river Parthenius, today's Bartın River. Sesamon is today's Amasra. This town was Amastris for Strabo, who writes of its founding through a union of Cytorus, Sesamon, and two other settlements. He reports that Cytorus was an emporium of Sinope and was a source for boxwood. He derives the name of Cytorus (he uses the neuter Cytorum) from Cytorus, a son of Phryxus and therefore one of the Argonauts.

In the Argonautica, Apollonius of Rhodes mentions the settlement of Cytorus and related places in describing the voyage of the Argo. Unlike Strabo, he does not mention Cytorus as a son of Phryxus. Apollonius does apparently place Cytorus where Gideros Bay is today, between the Bartın River and the city of Sinop.

Apollonius applies the epithet "woody" to Cytorus, alluding to the boxwood that Strabo mentions. In the 4th of the Carmina, Catullus addresses "Box-tree-clad Cytórus", while in the Georgics, Virgil says, "Fain would I gaze on Cytorus billowy with boxwood". The Homeric commentator Eustathius of Thessalonica mentions a saying, "carry boxwood to Cytorus," with the meaning of "carry coals to Newcastle".

Strabo's etymology notwithstanding, Bilge Umar finds the origin of the name Cytorus in the Luwian for "Big wall".

There is also reported a folk etymology for the modern name of Gideros, based on its resemblance to the Turkish gideriz (we go). Villagers say that Roman ships once sought shelter from a storm at Gideros Bay, and when the villagers asked the sailors if they would stay, the sailors replied, "Kalamazsak, gideros"—If we can't stay, we go. Pleased at the prospect of not having the Romans around, the villagers called the bay Gideros.
