= Graziella Concas =

Italian pianist and composer

Graziella Concas (born 7 January 1970) is an Italian pianist and composer.

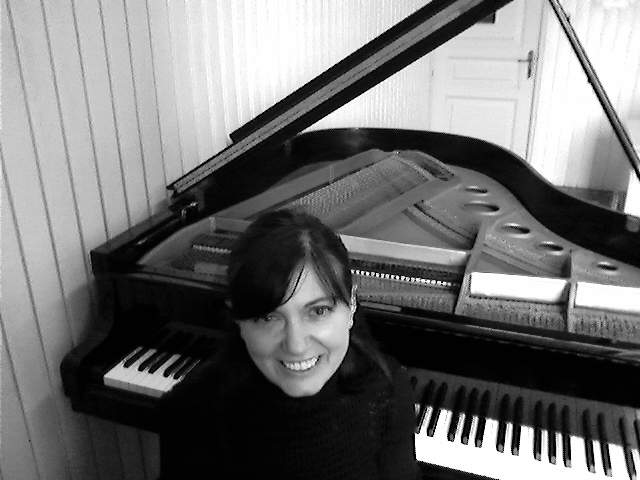
Graziella Concas (2005)

== Biography and career ==
She started studying piano at the age of five. Later she studied piano under Franca Zinghinì-Spinnicchia at the Catania Musical Institute ‘Vincenzo Bellini’, and composition under Angela Giuffrida. She later studied with Sergio Perticaroli, Agatella Catania, Aldo Ciccolini, Vera Gornostayeva and Boris Petrushansky. She is noted especially for her recordings of 20th century works and world premiere by composers such as Arnold Schoenberg, Olivier Messiaen, Mario Castelnuovo-Tedesco, Aldo Clementi, Giovanni Sollima, Francesco Pennisi, Alfredo Sangiorgi, Alexis Koustoulidis, Thomas Lawrence Toscano, Marco Betta, Roberto Carnevale, Alessandro Solbiati, Giovanni Ferrauto, Marina Leonardi, Sergio Pallante.

She won several awards: first prize at the 'Avagliano' Piano Competition; first prize at the ‘Ennio Porrino’ Piano Competition in Cagliari; first prize at the 'A.M.A. Calabria' Piano Competition; first prize at the 'Castello Normanno' Piano Competition; first prize at the 'Città di Barletta’ Piano Competition; second prize at the 'Città di Valentino' Piano Competition; second prize at the 'Città di Catanzaro’ international Piano Competition, third prize at the 'Kandinskij' International Competition, finalist at the 'Concorso Pianistico Internazionale "Arcangelo Speranza" (Taranto)’, at the 'Neglia' international Piano Competition and at the ‘Muzio Clementi’ Piano Competition (Firenze). She frequently appears as a member of the jury at important piano and chamber music competitions. She has collaborated with well-known musicians and orchestras: Augusto Vismara, Franco Petracchi, Ciro Scarponi, Roberto Carnevale, Alfio Antico, L'Offerta Musicale Ensemble, West Chester University Orchestra, Ploiești Philharmonic, etc. She has given recitals in Italy and in Europe: Festival Gazzelloni (Roccasecca), Festival Internazionale (Imola), Wiener Saal (Salzburg), Foerstr Hall (Prague), Lyceum Club (Catania), Amici della Musica (Cagliari), Amici della Musica (Palermo), Amici della Musica (Pistoia), Orestiadi (Gibellina), Associazione Musicale Romana (Rome), Associazione Musicale Etnea (Catania), Filarmonica Laudamo (Messina), Teatro Massimo Bellini (Catania), Teatro Sangiorgi (Catania), Teatro Massimo (Palermo), Teatro Garibaldi (Enna), etc.). She has recorded with CIMS, City Record, NEN-CD Classica, Suvini Zerboni.

She is professor of Piano and Chamber Music (two-year course of specialization) at the Catania Musical Institute ‘Vincenzo Bellini’.

== Bibliography ==
- Enciclopedia Italiana dei Compositori Contemporanei, edit. by Renzo Cresti, Pagano editore, 1997, IIt., pp. 158(sub voce), ISBN 88-87463-07-7.
- Annuario Istituto Bellini: A.A. 2000–2001 – Bicentenario Belliniano, Cinquantesimo anniversario dell'Istituto, edit. by Erminia Di Mauro, Istituto Musicale Vincenzo Bellini, 2002, 131 pp. IT\ICCU\LO1\0613399.
- Agostino Agazzari, Del sonare sopra 'l Basso con tutti li stromenti..., edit. by Graziella Concas, Palermo, NEN, 2003, IT\ICCU\LO1\0834426.
- Fedele Fenaroli, Regole musicali per i principianti di cembalo, edit. by Graziella Concas, Palermo, NEN, 2004, IT\ICCU\LO1\0834398.
