= Marziano =

Marziano is a surname and a given name. Notable people with the name include:

Given name:

- Marziano Capella (fl. c. 410–420), jurist, polymath and Latin prose writer
- Marziano Magnani (1936–1983), Italian wrestler
- Marziano Perosi (1875–1959), Italian composer, choirmaster and organist
- Marziano da Tortona (died 117 or 120 AD), saint of the Roman Catholic church

Surname:

- Elkana Marziano, Israeli singer of Moroccan-Jewish ancestry
- Sa’adia Marziano (1950–2007), Israeli social activist and politician

== See also ==
- Ciao marziano, 1980 Italian science fiction-comedy film
- Santissima Trinità e San Marziano, Lentini, Roman Catholic church in Syracuse, Sicily, Italy
- Los Marziano, 2010 Argentine comedy-drama film
