= Herbert Broennle =

German Luftwaffe pilot (1920–1943)

Herbert Brönnle
- Born: 25 December 1920; Munich, Free State of Bavaria, Weimar Republic
- Died: 4 July 1943 (aged 22) near Lake Lentini, Fascist Italy
- Cause of death: Killed in action
- Military career
- Allegiance: Nazi Germany
- Branch: Luftwaffe
- Service years: 1940–1943
- Rank: Leutnant (second lieutenant)
- Units: JG 54, JG 53
- Conflicts: World War II: Operation Barbarossa; Defense of the Reich
- Awards: Knight's Cross of the Iron Cross

Herbert Brönnle (25 December 1920 – 4 July 1943) was a Luftwaffe ace and recipient of the Knight's Cross of the Iron Cross during World War II. The Knight's Cross of the Iron Cross, and its variants were the highest awards in the military and paramilitary forces of Nazi Germany during World War II. Broennle was killed on 4 July 1943 when he was shot down north of Lake Lentini in Italy. He was credited with 58 victories in 387 missions.

== Early life and career ==
Brönnle was born on 25 December 1920 in Pasing, a district of Munich, in the Free State of Bavaria, then part of the Weimar Republic. He joined the military service of the Luftwaffe and in 1939 received flight training. (Note: Flight training in the Luftwaffe progressed through the levels A1, A2 and B1, B2, referred to as A/B flight training. A training included theoretical and practical training in aerobatics, navigation, long-distance flights and dead-stick landings. The B courses included high-altitude flights, instrument flights, night landings and training to handle the aircraft in difficult situations.) In September 1940, Brönnle was posted to 2. Staffel (2nd squadron) of Jagdgeschwader 54 (JG 54—54th Fighter Wing). At the time, his Staffel was commanded by Oberleutnant Rudolf Unger and subordinated to 2. Gruppe (1st group) of JG 54 headed by Hauptmann Hubertus von Bonin. On 23 September, the Gruppe had been withdrawn from Campagne-lès-Guines near the English Channel in France and ordered to Jever Airfield where the Gruppe was replenished. At Jever, the Gruppe flew fighter patrols over the German Bight.

== World War II ==
World War II in Europe had begun on Friday 1 September 1939, when German forces invaded Poland. In April 1941, 2. Staffel moved to Wangerooge Airfield located on the East Frisian Island of Wangerooge. Here on 27 May, Brönnle was injured when his Messerschmitt Bf 109 E-4 (Werknummer 2797—factory number) suffered engine failure resulting in an emergency landing at Wangerooge. On 14 June, the Gruppe was withdrawn and began preparations for the German invasion of the Soviet Union.

=== War against the Soviet Union ===
Operation Barbarossa, the German invasion of the Soviet Union, began on 22 June 1941. In the fortnight prior, JG 54 had been moved to an airfield in Lindenthal near Rautenberg, East Prussia, present-day Uslowoje in Kaliningrad Oblast. Tasked with supporting Army Group North in its advance through the Baltic states towards Leningrad, the unit began combat operations shortly afterwards. The next day, Brönnle claimed his first aerial victory when pilots of I. Gruppe of JG 54 claimed 14 Tupolev SB-2 bombers shot down, including one by Brönnle. On 29 July, I. Gruppe moved to a makeshift airfield named Malaja Owsischtschi located near Lake Ozero Samro (58°58′18″N 28°46′16″E) east of Lake Peipus where they remained until 24 August. Here, the Gruppe supported German forces in the attack on Leningrad. Here on 17 August, Brönnle made a forced landing near Tschertskowad when his Bf 109 F-2 (Werknummer 5444) suffered engine failure. His crash-site was 19 kilometers (12 miles) behind Soviet lines. Avoiding capture by diving into a river, Brönnle returned to German held territory the following day.

On 2 February 1942, Brönnle may have shot down Ivan Chulkov from the Soviet 41 IAP Fighter Regiment. (Note: IAP—Istrebitelny Aviatsionny Polk (Fighter Aviation Regiment—Истребительный Авиационный Полк)) Brönnle was the only pilot of JG 54 to claim an aerial victory that day. On 14 May, Brönnle engaged in aerial combat with SB-2 bombers near Peterhof. In this encounter, his Bf 109 F-4 (Werknummer 7474) was damaged, resulting in an emergency landing at Krasnogvardeysk, present-day Gatchina, and injuring Brönnle. While hospitalized, Brönnle was awarded the German Cross in Gold (Deutsches Kreuz in Gold) on 15 June.

Following his convalescence, Brönnle returned to his unit in October 1942 and was promoted to Oberfeldwebel, a non-commissioned officer's rank. In mid-December 1942, I. Gruppe began converting to the Focke-Wulf Fw 190 A-4 radial engine powered fighter. The conversion training took place at Heiligenbeil, present-day Mamonovo, before returning to Krasnogvardeysk.

On 14 March 1943, Brönnle, together with Oberleutnant Günter Fink, were awarded the Knight's Cross of the Iron Cross (Ritterkreuz des Eisernen Kreuzes) after 57 and 46 aerial victories respectively. Brönnle then briefly served as an instructor with Ergänzungs-Jagdgruppe Süd, a supplementary training unit, before transferring to Jagdgeschwader 53 (JG 53—53rd Fighter Wing).

=== Squadron leader and death ===
On 10 May 1943, JG 53 was stationed at various airfields in Sicily, the Geschwaderstab (headquarters unit) and II. Gruppe were based at Comiso Airfield, I. Gruppe was assigned to Catania Airfield and III. Gruppe at Sciacca. On 26 May, the United States Army Air Forces (USAAF) sent 45 Boeing B-17 Flying Fortress bombers of the 2nd and 301st Bombardment Group on a mission to bomb Comiso Airfield. Defending against this attack, Brönnle claimed one of the B-17s shot down 20 kilometers (12 miles) southwest of Gela. The B-17F "42-29594" of 96th Bomb Squadron, 2nd Bombardment Group was shot up with one member of the crew killed in action but managed to return.

On 22 June 1943, Brönnle was appointed Staffelkapitän (squadron leader) of JG 53, replacing Oberleutnant Dietrich Kasten in this capacity. The Staffel was subordinated to I. Gruppe of JG 53 led by Major Friedrich-Karl Müller and was based in Vibo Valentia, Italy at the time. Less than two weeks later, on 4 July, Brönnle was shot down and killed in action in his Bf 109 G-6/R1 (Werknummer 18430) by Supermarine Spitfire fighters north of Lago di Lentini. He was briefly succeeded by Oberleutnant Heinz-Günther Hennig as commander of 2. Staffel before Oberleutnant Kasten returned and took command again on 22 July. According to Dixon, his victor may have been the New Zealand fighter pilot Evan Mackie who claimed a Bf 109 shot down that day. In the account given by Shores, Massimello, Guest and Olynyk, Brönnle was experiencing engine trouble and was retreating from combat when he came under attack from four to eight Spitfire fighters of the Royal Air Force No. 43 Squadron. In this account, Brönnle was shot down by Flight Lieutenant Graham James Cox.

== Summary of career ==
=== Aerial victory claims ===
According to Obermaier, Brönnle was credited with 58 victories claimed in 387 combat missions, with 57 victories over the Eastern Front and one four-engined heavy bomber over the Western Front. Mathews and Foreman, authors of Luftwaffe Aces — Biographies and Victory Claims, researched the German Federal Archives and found records for 58 aerial victory claims, of which 57 were claimed on the Eastern Front and one four-engined heavy bomber on the Western Front.

Victory claims were logged to a map-reference (PQ = Planquadrat), for example "PQ 10184". The Luftwaffe grid map (Jägermeldenetz) covered all of Europe, western Russia and North Africa and was composed of rectangles measuring 15 minutes of latitude by 30 minutes of longitude, an area of about 360 square miles (930 km^{2}). These sectors were then subdivided into 36 smaller units to give a location area 3 km × 4 km (1.9 mi × 2.5 mi) in size.

Chronicle of aerial victories
This and the ? (question mark) indicates information discrepancies listed by Prien, Stemmer, Rodeike, Bock, Mathews and Foreman.
Claim	Date	Time	Type	Location	Claim	Date	Time	Type	Location
– 2. Staffel of Jagdgeschwader 54 – Operation Barbarossa — 22 June – 5 December 1941
1	23 June 1941	10:16	SB-2		11	16 August 1941	15:15	I-153	
2	6 July 1941	18:35	SB-2		12	19 August 1941	14:35	DB-3	
3	6 July 1941	18:38	SB-2		13	24 August 1941	11:05	DB-3	
4	6 July 1941	18:45	SB-2		14	8 September 1941	16:25	I-153	
5	10 July 1941	19:12	SB-3		15	8 September 1941	16:26	R-5	2 km (1.2 mi) east of Schinskoje Selo
6	17 July 1941	18:20	I-18 (MiG-1)		16	10 September 1941	18:00	I-18 (MiG-1)	
7	19 July 1941	18:31	I-16		17	11 September 1941	15:18	I-18 (MiG-1)	
8	31 July 1941	16:48	I-18 (MiG-1)		18	12 September 1941	06:00	I-153	
9	10 August 1941	17:20	SB-3		19	21 September 1941	16:59	I-18 (MiG-1)	
10	12 August 1941	17:40	SB-2		20	23 September 1941	10:53	I-18 (MiG-1)	
– 2. Staffel of Jagdgeschwader 54 – Eastern Front — 6 December 1941 – 30 April 1942
21	2 February 1942	15:30	I-18 (MiG-1)		26	16 March 1942	16:55	I-16	
22	3 February 1942	12:40? (Note: According to Mathews and Foreman claimed at 12:10.)	I-18 (MiG-1)		27	20 March 1942	17:05	P-40	
23	5 February 1942	08:50	I-18 (MiG-1)	9 km (5.6 mi) southeast of Malaya Vishera	28	28 March 1942	13:40	I-15	
24	5 February 1942	09:12	Pe-2		29	12 April 1942	15:15	Yak-1	
25	27 February 1942	08:45	I-18 (MiG-1)		30	18 April 1942	12:30	Yak-1	
– 2. Staffel of Jagdgeschwader 54 – Eastern Front — 1 May 1942 – 3 February 1943
31	14 May 1942	15:17	SB-2		41	14 January 1943	11:10	La-5	PQ 10161 southeast of Shlisselburg
32	14 May 1942	15:18	SB-2		42	14 January 1943	11:20	Hurricane	PQ 10184 southeast of Shlisselburg
33	22 October 1942	13:56	I-15	PQ 1161	43? (Note: This claim is not listed by Mathews and Foreman.)	14 January 1943	14:37	Il-2	PQ 00292
? (Note: According to Prien, Stemmer, Rodeike and Bock this claim was not attributed to Brönnle. Feldwebel Peter Bremer claimed a Petlyakov Pe-2 shot down at 12:05 in a location 6 kilometers (3.7 miles) north of Fedorovna.)	23 October 1942	12:05	Pe-2	6 km (3.7 mi) north of Techerwino	44	15 January 1943	09:00	La-5	PQ 10163 southeast of Shlisselburg
34	11 November 1942	08:29	P-40	PQ 10211; 45 km (28 mi) west of Volkhov	45	15 January 1943	14:15	P-40	PQ 00291; 10 km (6.2 mi) west of Mga
35	7 January 1943	14:04	LaGG-3	PQ 10213; 45 km (28 mi) west of Volkhov	46	15 January 1943	14:25	La-5	PQ 10142 south of Shlisselburg
36	12 January 1943	11:15	Il-2	PQ 10151 southeast of Shlisselburg	47	22 January 1943	12:55	Il-2	PQ 10174 vicinity of Mga
37	12 January 1943	11:18	Il-2	PQ 10162 southeast of Shlisselburg	48	22 January 1943	13:00	Il-2	PQ 10153 southeast of Shlisselburg
38	12 January 1943	11:32	Il-2	PQ 00264; 10 km (6.2 mi) southwest of Shlisselburg	49	23 January 1943	11:00	Yak-1	PQ 10142 south of Shlisselburg
39	13 January 1943	09:15	Il-2	PQ 10154 southeast of Shlisselburg	50	24 January 1943	11:45	LaGG-3	PQ 00234; 10 km (6.2 mi) west of Shlisselburg
40	13 January 1943	13:20	Il-2	PQ 00443; 10 km (6.2 mi) southeast of Slutsk	51	27 January 1943	14:15	Il-2	PQ 00291; 10 km (6.2 mi) west of Mga
– 2. Staffel of Jagdgeschwader 54 – Eastern Front — 4 February – March 1943
52	5 March 1943	14:57? (Note: According to Mathews and Foreman claimed at 14:37.)	LaGG-3	PQ 36 Ost 28312; 20 km (12 mi) west-northwest of Demyansk	55	17 March 1943	16:15	LaGG-3	PQ 35 Ost 18333; 30 km (19 mi) south of Staraya Russa
53	5 March 1943	14:58? (Note: According to Mathews and Foreman claimed at 14:38.)	LaGG-3	PQ 36 Ost 28323; 15 km (9.3 mi) northwest of Demyansk	56	17 March 1943	16:16? (Note: According to Mathews and Foreman claimed at 16:17.)	LaGG-3	PQ 35 Ost 18334; 30 km (19 mi) south of Staraya Russa
54	15 March 1943	08:45	Il-2	PQ 36 Ost 10184 east of Mga	57	21 March 1943	11:50	P-39	PQ 36 Ost 00273; 15 km (9.3 mi) northeast of Pushkin
– Stab I. Gruppe of Jagdgeschwader 53 – Sicily — May 1943
58	26 May 1943	12:30	B-17	20 km (12 mi) southwest of Gela; 20 km (12 mi) southwest of Gozo					
– 2. Staffel of Jagdgeschwader 53 – Sicily — July 1943
? (Note: This claim is not listed in the 2010 book by Prien, Stemmer, Rodeike and Bock, nor by Mathews and Foreman.)	2 July 1943	—	B-24						

=== Awards ===
- Iron Cross (1939) 2nd and 1st Class
- Honor Goblet of the Luftwaffe on 7 October 1941 as Unteroffizier in a Jagdgeschwader
- German Cross in Gold on 15 June 1942 as Feldwebel in the I./Jagdgeschwader 54
- Knight's Cross of the Iron Cross on 14 March 1943 as Oberfeldwebel and pilot in the 4./Jagdgeschwader 54 (Note: According to Scherzer as pilot in the 2./Jagdgeschwader 54.)
