= Santa Maria la Cava e Sant'Alfio =

Church building in Lentini, Italy

Coordinates: 37.28535°N 14.99835°E

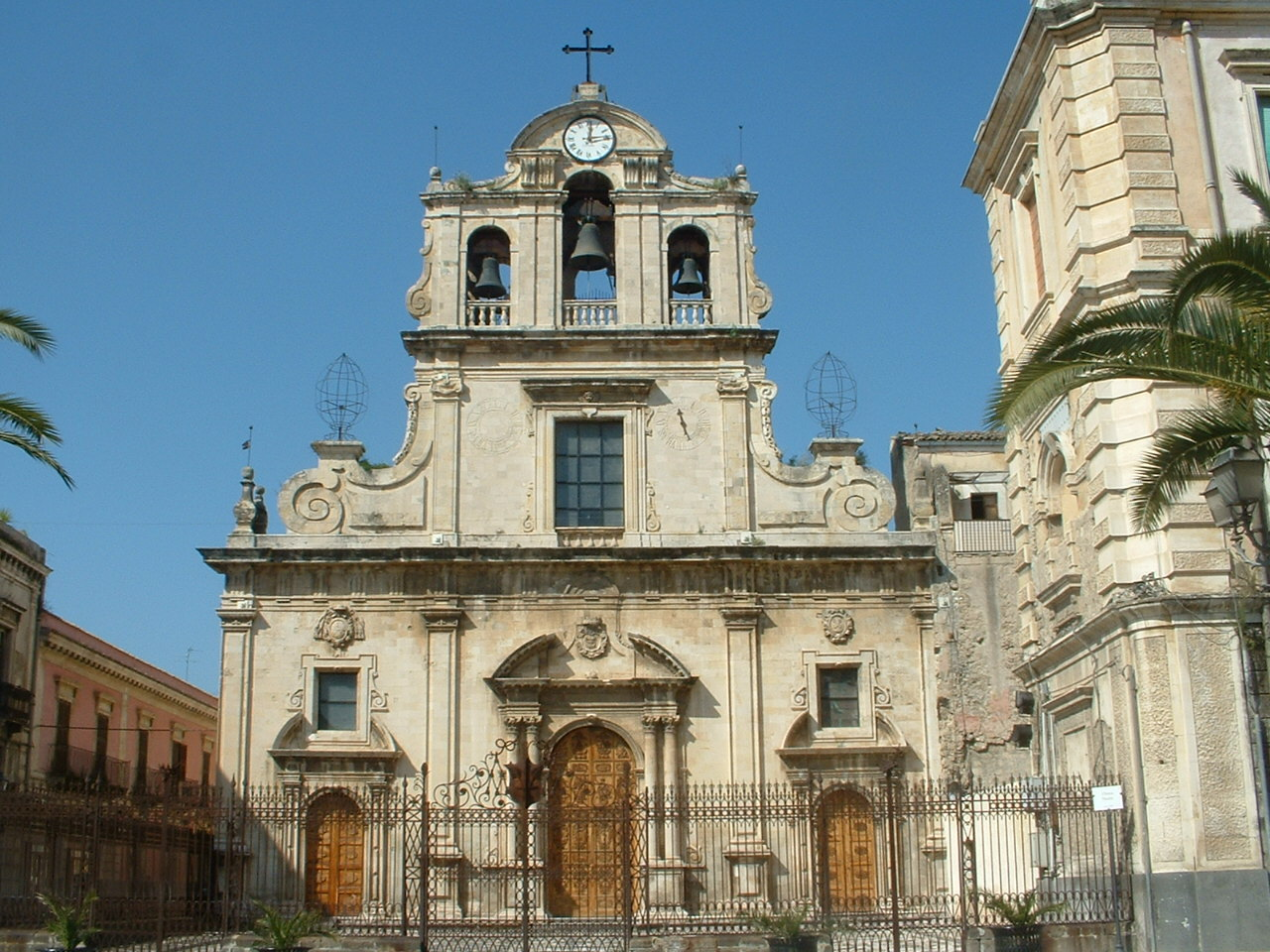
- Facade

Religion
- Affiliation: Catholic Church

Location
- Location: Lentini, Italy
- Interactive map of Santa Maria la Cava e Sant'Alfio

Architecture
- Architect: Vincenzo Vella da Malta
- Type: Church
- Style: Baroque
- Groundbreaking: 1693
- Completed: 1747

Website
- Official website

The Chiesa madre of Santa Maria la Cava e Sant'Alfio ('Mother Church of St. Mary of the Pit and St. Alphius') is the main Roman Catholic church in Lentini, province of Syracuse, Sicily Italy.

== History and description ==
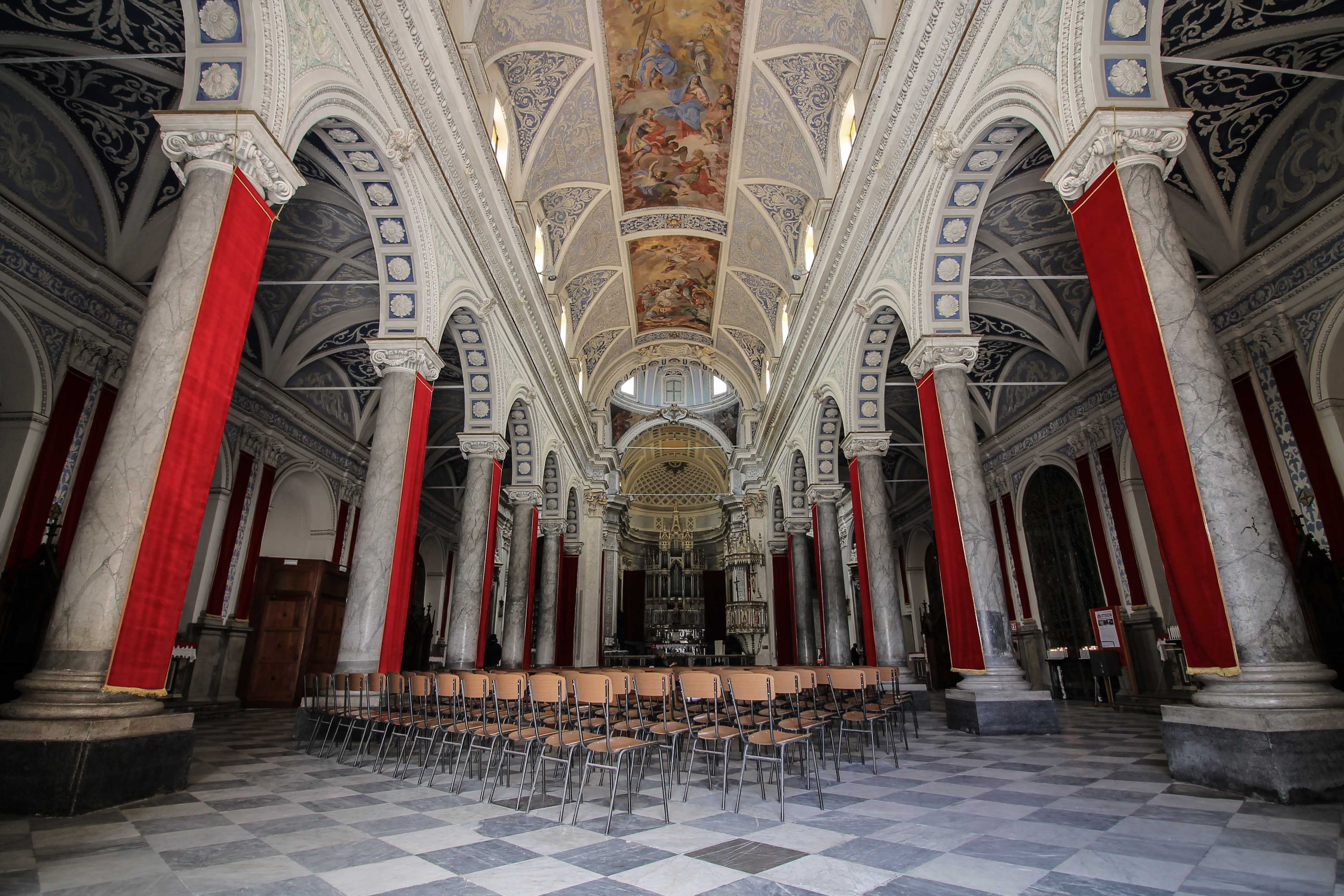
The central nave

The present church was built after the 1693 Sicily earthquake by merging the former cathedral of Santa Maria la Cava with the chapter of the collegiate church dedicated to the Saints Alphius, Philadelphus and Cyrinus. Construction began in 1700 and continued until 1750.

Built in baroque-style, the interior has three naves. In the left nave, the reliquary float of St. Alphius, made of silver, is stored. The float is carried in a procession through the main streets of Lentini during the celebrations for Saints Alphius (9–11 May), the patron saint of the town. The right nave hosts the sepulchres of the martyrs Alphius, Philadelphus and Cyrinus.

Notably, the church hosts a Byzantine icon of the Virgin Hodegetria dated from the 12th century.
