= Lentini =

Lentini Lintini (Sicilian)
- Comune
- Comune di Lentini
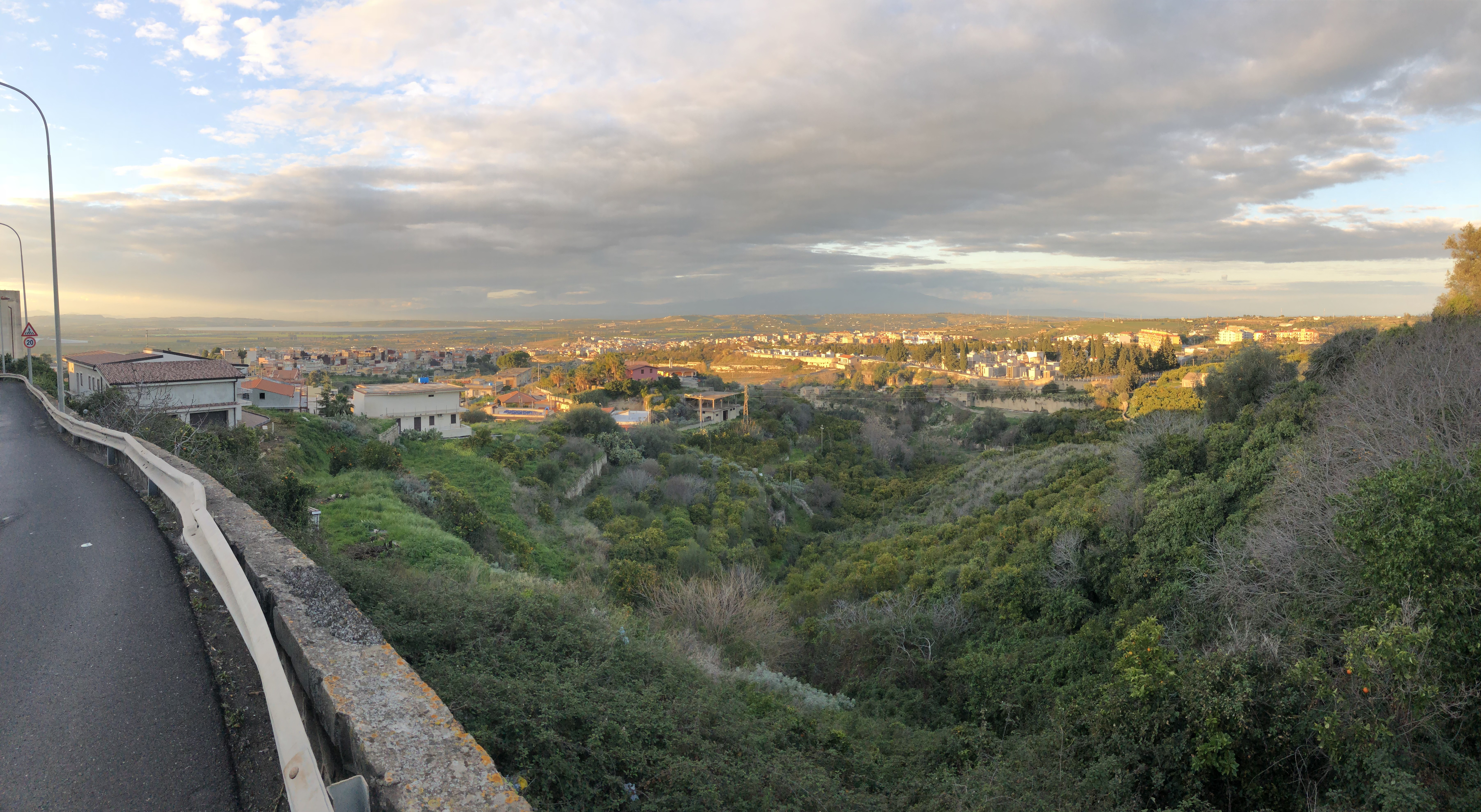
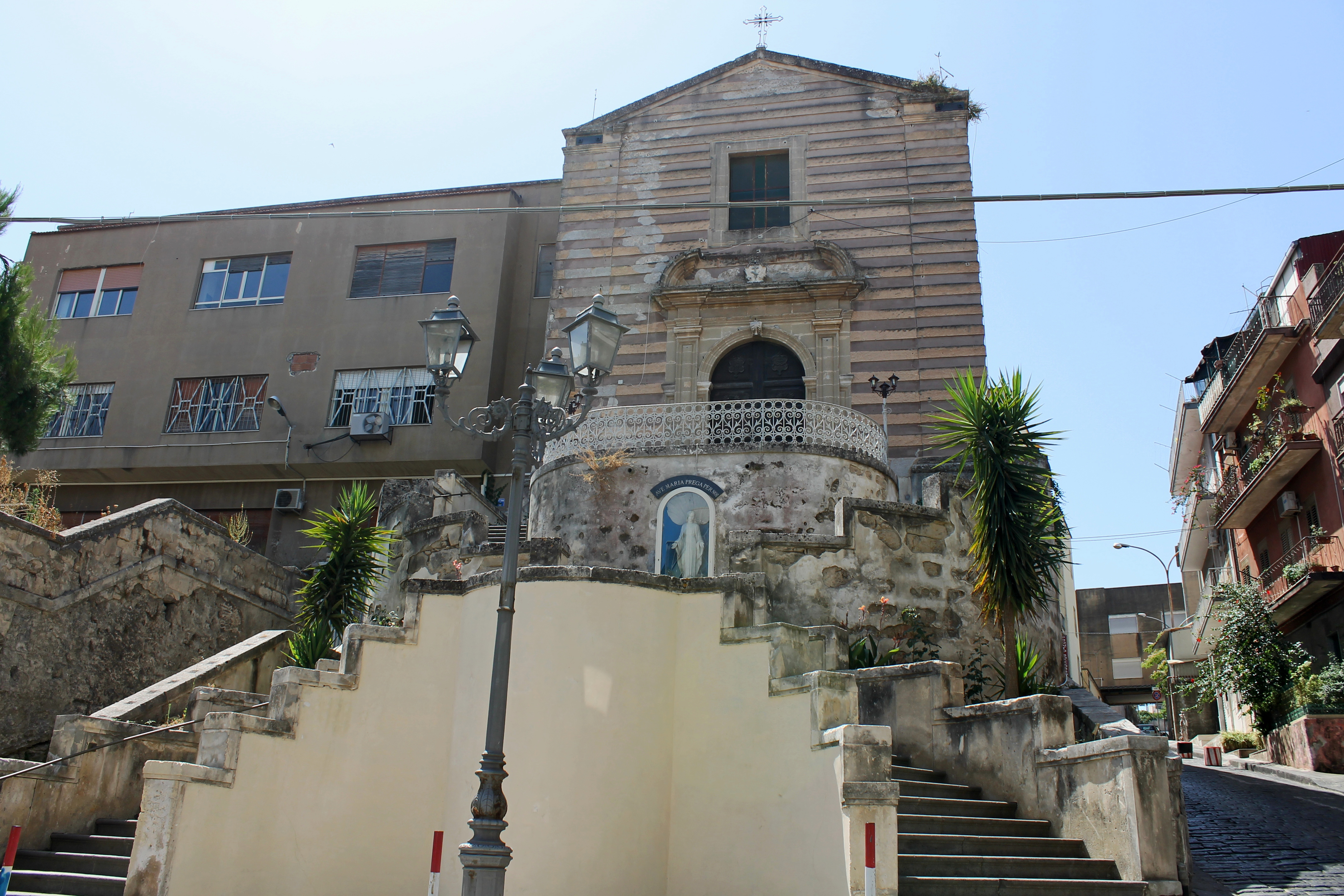
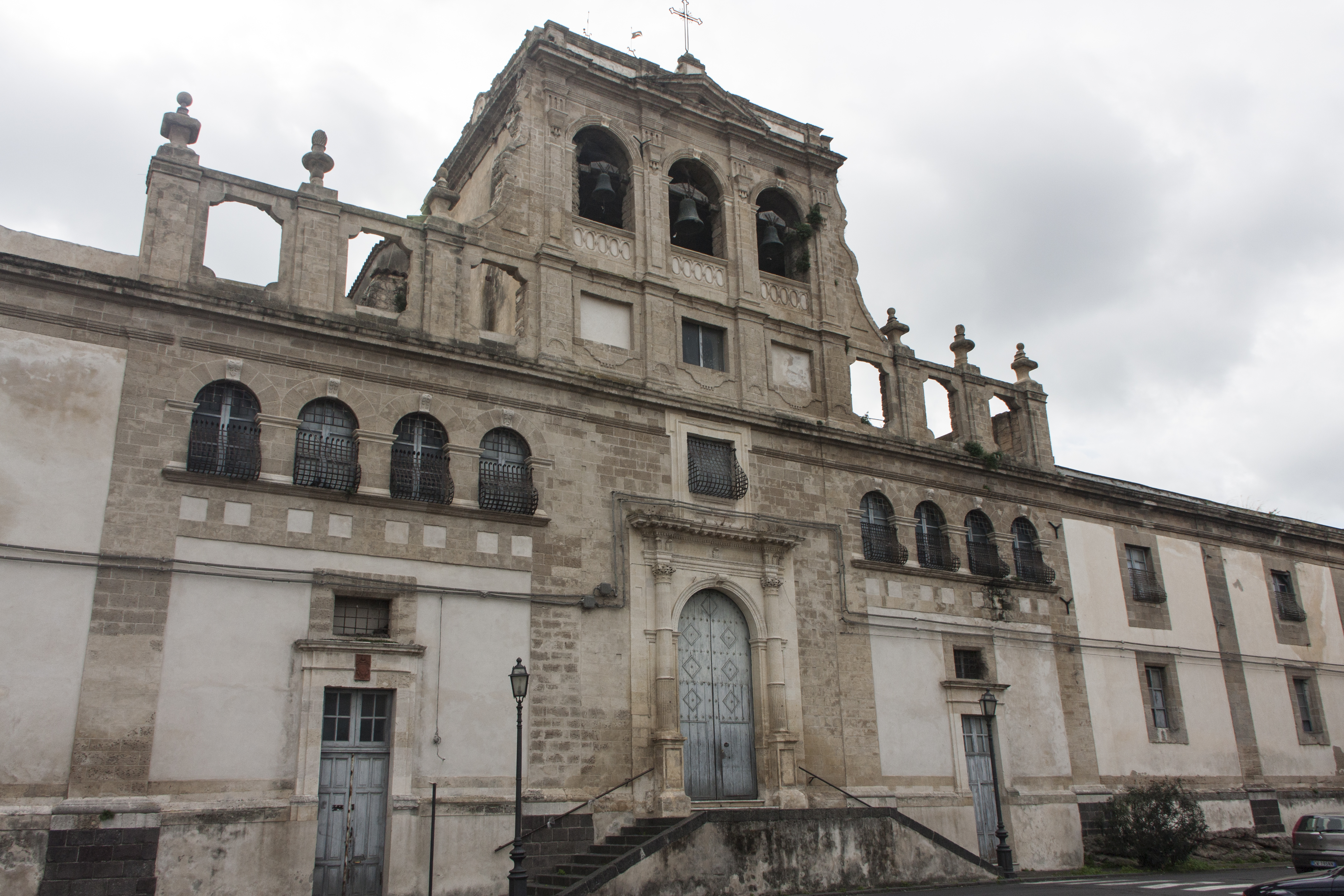
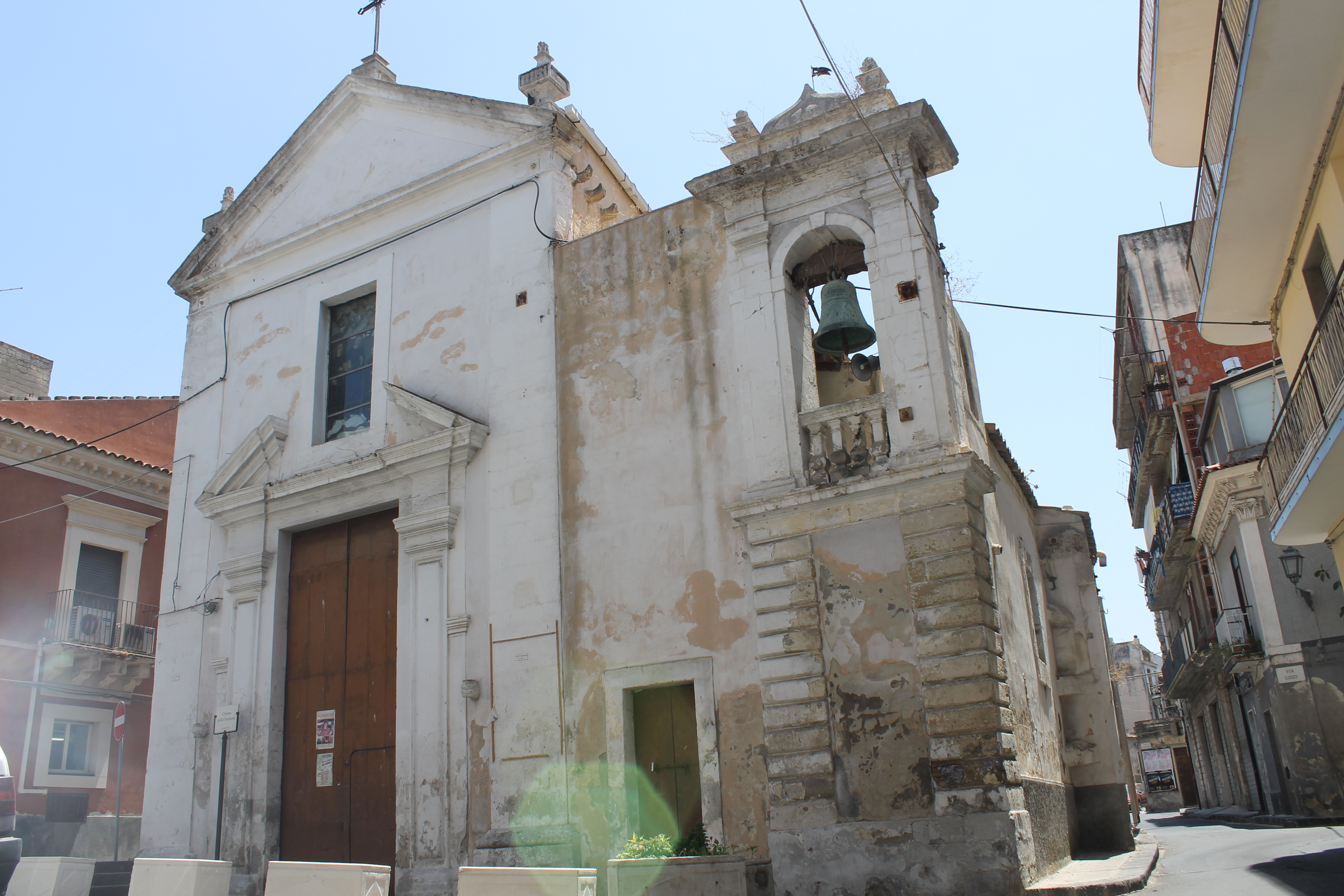
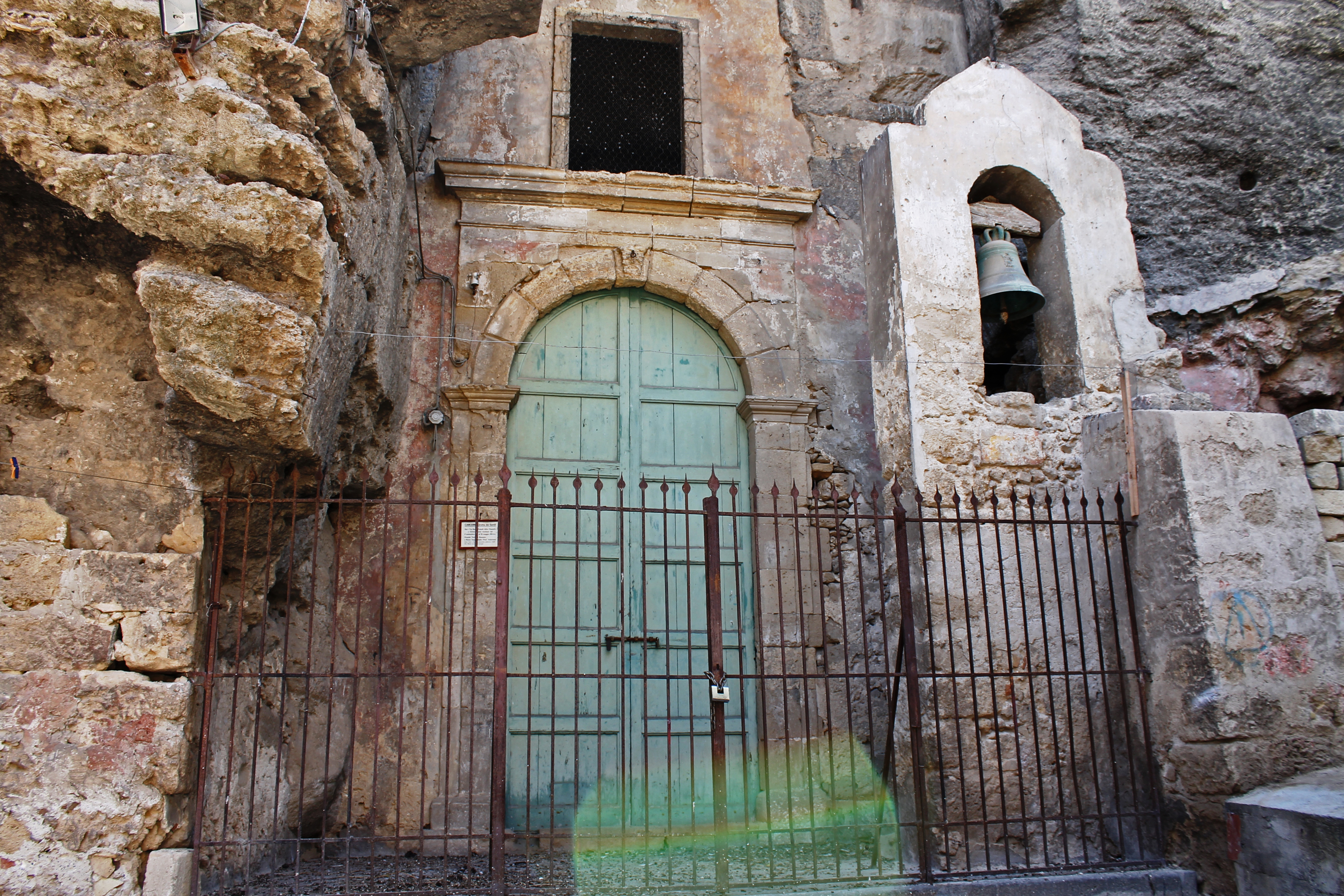
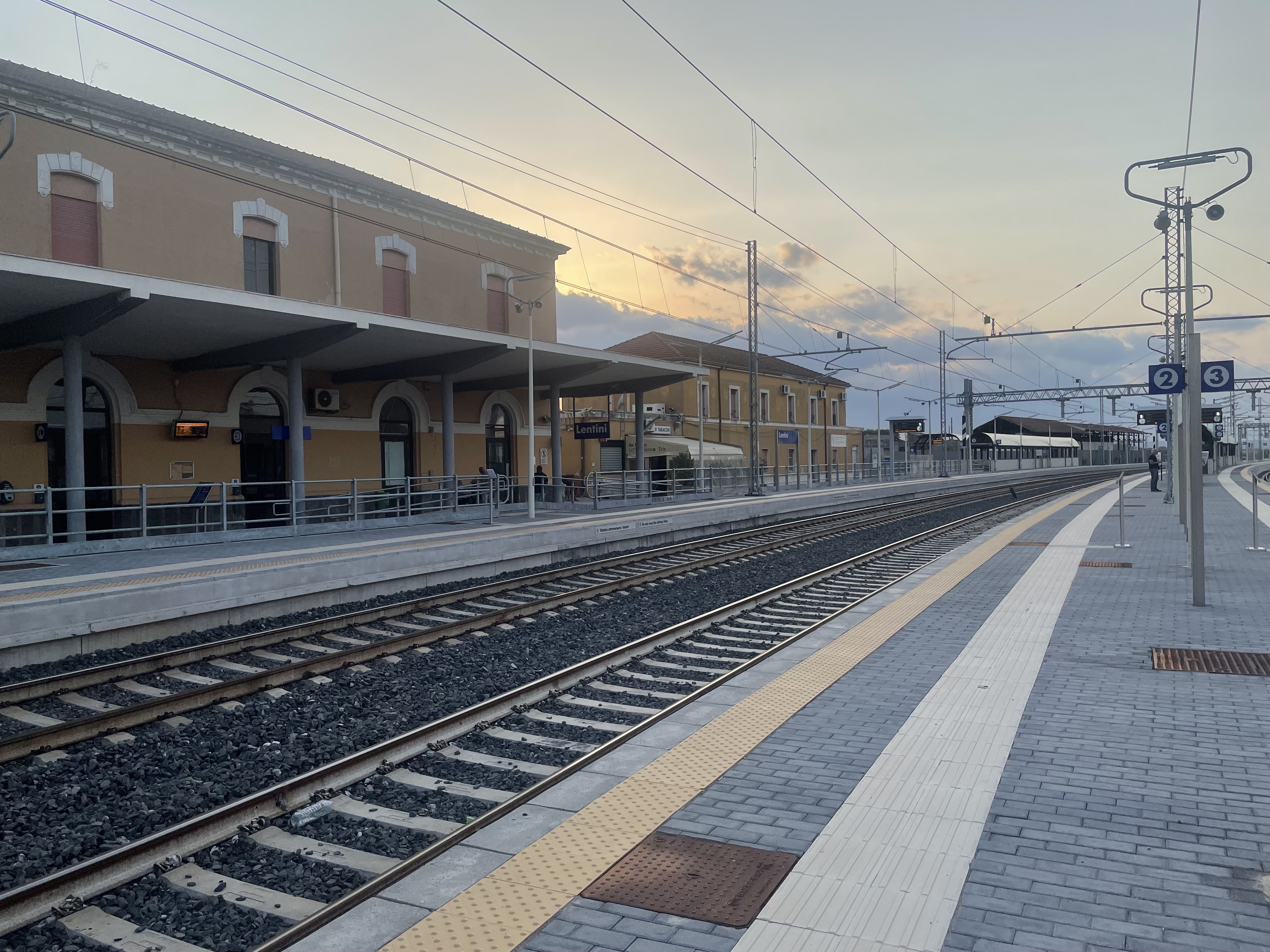
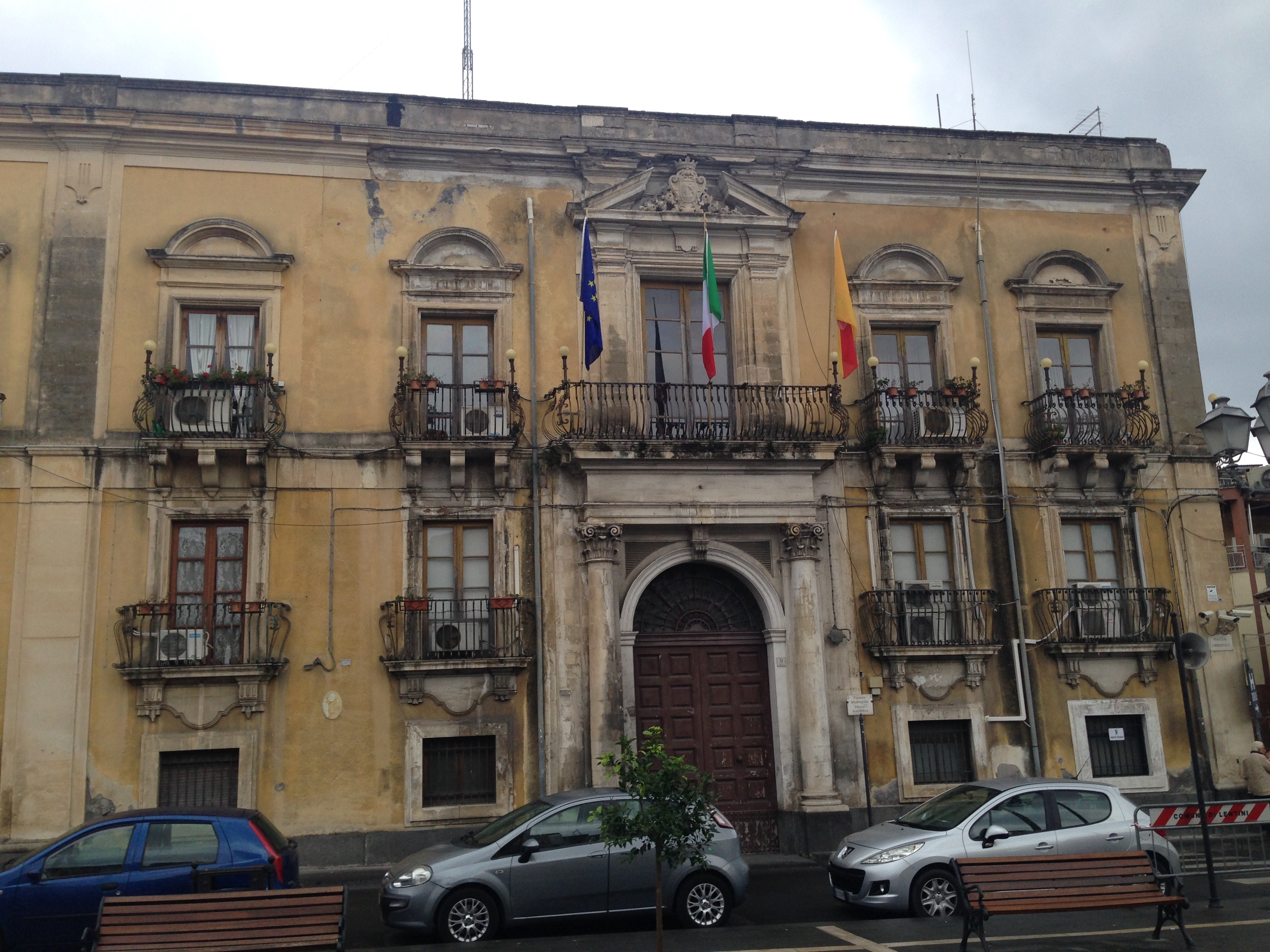
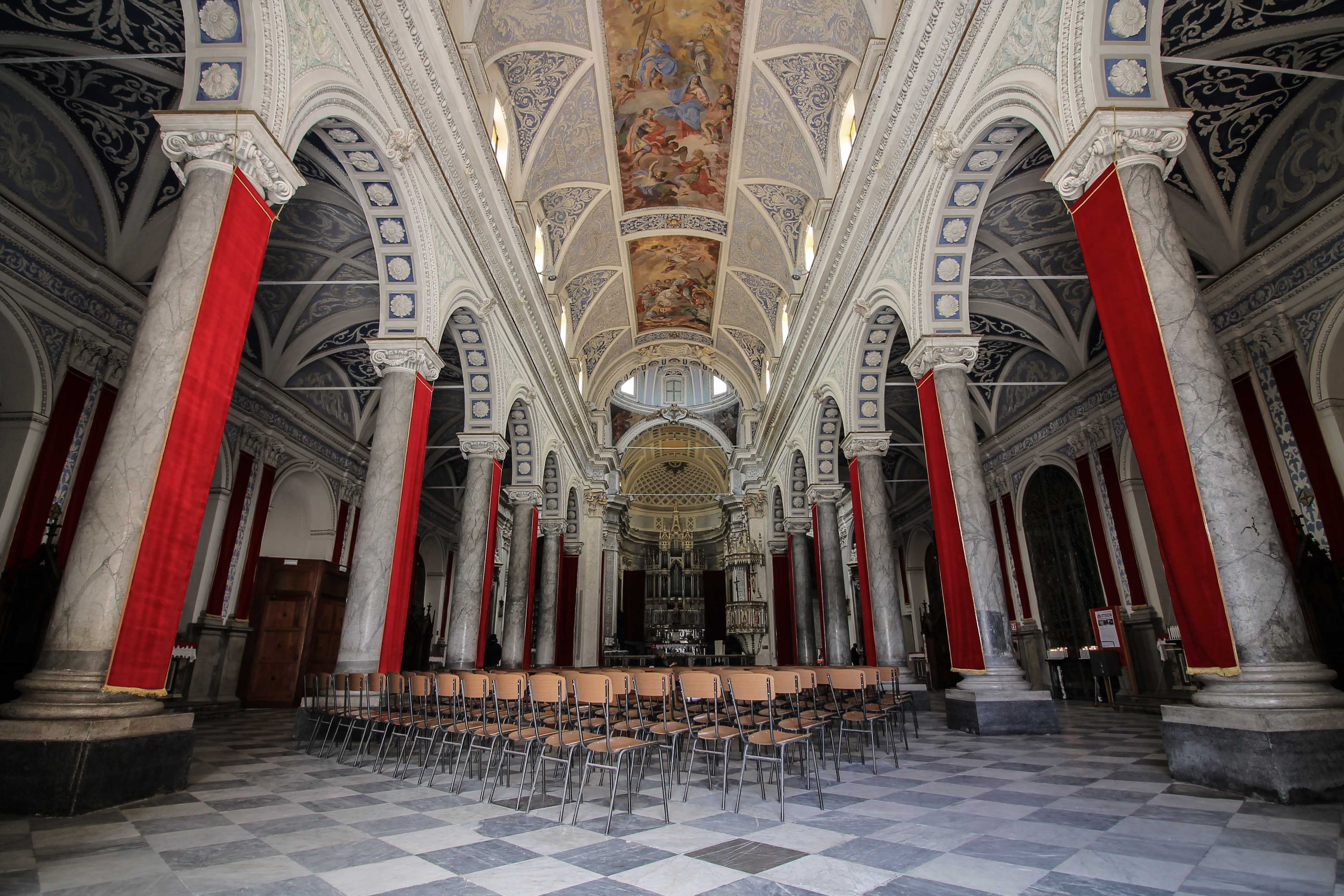
- View San Francesco all'Immacolata Santissima Trinità e San Marziano Chiesa della Fontana Chiesa del Sacro Carcere dei Tre Santi Train station Municipio Santa Maria la Cava e Sant'Alfio

- Coat of arms
- Nickname: Città delle arance (Italian) (lit. 'City of Oranges')
- Location within Italy Location within Sicily
- Coordinates: 37°17′N 15°00′E
- Country: Italy
- Region: Sicily
- Province: Syracuse (SR)

Government
  - Mayor: Rosario Lo Faro (Lista civica)

Area
  - Total: 215.75 km^{2} (83.30 sq mi)
- Elevation: 53 m (174 ft)

Population (31 October 2023)
  - Total: 21,425
  - Density: 99.305/km^{2} (257.20/sq mi)
- Demonym(s): Italian: lentinese (sg.), lentinesi (pl.); Sicilian: lintinisi (m. sg., pl.), lintinisa (f. sg.)
- Time zone: UTC+1 (CET)
  - Summer (DST): UTC+2 (CEST)
- Postal code: 96016
- Dialing code: 095
- Patron saint: Saints Alphius, Philadelphus and Cyrinus
- Saint day: May 10
- Website: Official website

Lentini (Italian: [lenˈtiːni]; Sicilian: Lintini; Latin: Leontīnī; Ancient Greek: Λεοντῖνοι, romanized: Leontînoi) is a town and comune in the Province of Syracuse, southeastern Sicily (Southern Italy), located 35 km (22 miles) north-west of Syracuse.

== History ==
The city was founded by colonists from Naxos as Leontini in 729 BC, which in its beginnings was a Chalcidian colony established five years earlier in Magna Graecia.

It is virtually the only Greek settlement in Sicily that is not located on the coast, founded around 10 km inland. The site, originally held by the Sicels, was seized by the Greeks owing to their command on the fertile plain in the north. The city was reduced to subject status in 494 BC by Hippocrates of Gela, who made his ally Aenesidemus its tyrant. In 476 BC, Hieron of Syracuse moved the inhabitants from Catana and Naxos to Leontini.

Later on, the city of Leontini regained its independence. However, as a part of the inhabitants' efforts to retain their independence, they invoked more than once the interventions of Athens. It was mainly the eloquence of Gorgias of Leontini which led to the abortive Athenian expedition of 427 BC.

In 422 BC, the Greek city-state of Syracuse supported the oligarchs against the people and received them as citizens, Leontini itself being forsaken. This led to a renewed, initially diplomatic, Athenian intervention. The exiles of Leontini joined the envoys of Segesta in persuading Athens to undertake the great Sicilian Expedition of 415 BC.

After the failure of the Expedition, Leontini became subject to Syracuse once more. The city's independence was guaranteed by the treaty of 405 BC between Dionysius and the Carthaginians, but it was soon lost again. The city was finally stormed by Marcus Claudius Marcellus in 214 BC.

In Roman times, it seemed to have been of little importance. It was destroyed by the Saracens in 847 AD, and almost completely ruined by the earthquake of 1693.

The ancient city is described by Polybius as lying in a valley between two hills and facing north. On the western side of this valley, a river flowed with a row of houses on its western bank below the hill. At each end was a gate, the northern gate leading to the plain, the southern at the upper end, leading to Syracuse. On each side of the valley was an acropolis lying between precipitous hills with flat tops, over which buildings extended. The eastern hill still has the remains of a strongly fortified medieval castle, in which some writers are inclined (though wrongly) to recognise portions of the Greek masonry.

Excavations were made in 1899 in one of the ravines in a Sicel necropolis of the third period; explorations in the various Greek cemeteries resulted in the discovery of some fine bronzes, notably a lebes.

During World War II, Lentini was occupied by the forces of Benito Mussolini's fascist government, though that government was deeply unpopular in Lentini as it was throughout most of Sicily. By the time the Allied invasion of Sicily occurred through Operation Husky, Lentini was occupied by German troops from the Nazi Germany's army. Nazi Germany's troops occupied the town until the arrival of British troops (specifically the Parachute Regiment) serving under Bernard Montgomery.

== Geography ==
Lentini is a municipality of 215.84 km² located 52 km northwest of the provincial capital, Syracuse. It is situated at an elevation of 53 meters above sea level on the first hill slopes at the southern edge of the Plain of Catania.

It is the ancient Leontinoi, one of the first Greek colonies in Sicily, and has significant archaeological remains. Not far from the town, to the northwest, lies the basin of the Lago di Lentini (better known as Biviere), which was once completely drained and today has been restored at its old site. The sea (Agnone Bagni) is 12 km from the town centre.

The Lentini area's environment is mainly characterised by its numerous citrus groves. It is called the Città delle arance ("City of Oranges") due to its high production of Siciian blood orange. The 15th meridian east, the reference line for Central European Time (UTC+1), passes through the town.

=== Climate ===
Lentini's climate is Mediterranean, with mild winters and hot summers. During the coldest months, the average temperature during the day is around 15 °C, while the warmest months see average daytime temperatures that reach 34 °C. In summer, temperatures reach 40 °C every year and temperatures over 45 °C are not unheard of. Winter also encounters temperatures over 15 °C yearly, with temperatures over 20 °C also occurring, but less frequently. Occasionally, winter lows go down to 0 °C, but rarely go under 0 °C. Summer lows normally do not go under 17 °C but can occasionally go down to 15 °C. While the climate is relatively dry all year round, there is a marked difference between precipitation days in summer, that experiences rain very rarely, and in winter, where rain occurs more frequently.

== Economy ==
Lentini's primary sector is based on the cultivation of cereals, wheat, vegetables, fodder, vineyards, olive groves, citrus groves (orange orchards especially represent the area's main economic activity) a well as cattle, sheep, pig and goat ranching. The secondary economic sector is made up of companies operating in areas such as food, construction, engineering, electronics, plastic goods manufacturing, refined petroleum products, medical and surgical equipment, furniture, wood processing, stone and ore extraction. Notable among craft activities is terracotta workmanship. A strong commercial network supplements the tertiary sector. There are private broadcasting stations and television networks.
The city is also known for the production of the blood orange, specifically the Tarocco, Moro, and Sanguinella cultivars.

== Sport ==
Lentini is home to the SS Leonzio 1909 football team and has its own city stadium.

== Attractions ==
=== Archaeological sites ===
- Castellaccio: Ruins of a medieval fortress located on a hill overlooking the town.

=== Religious sites ===
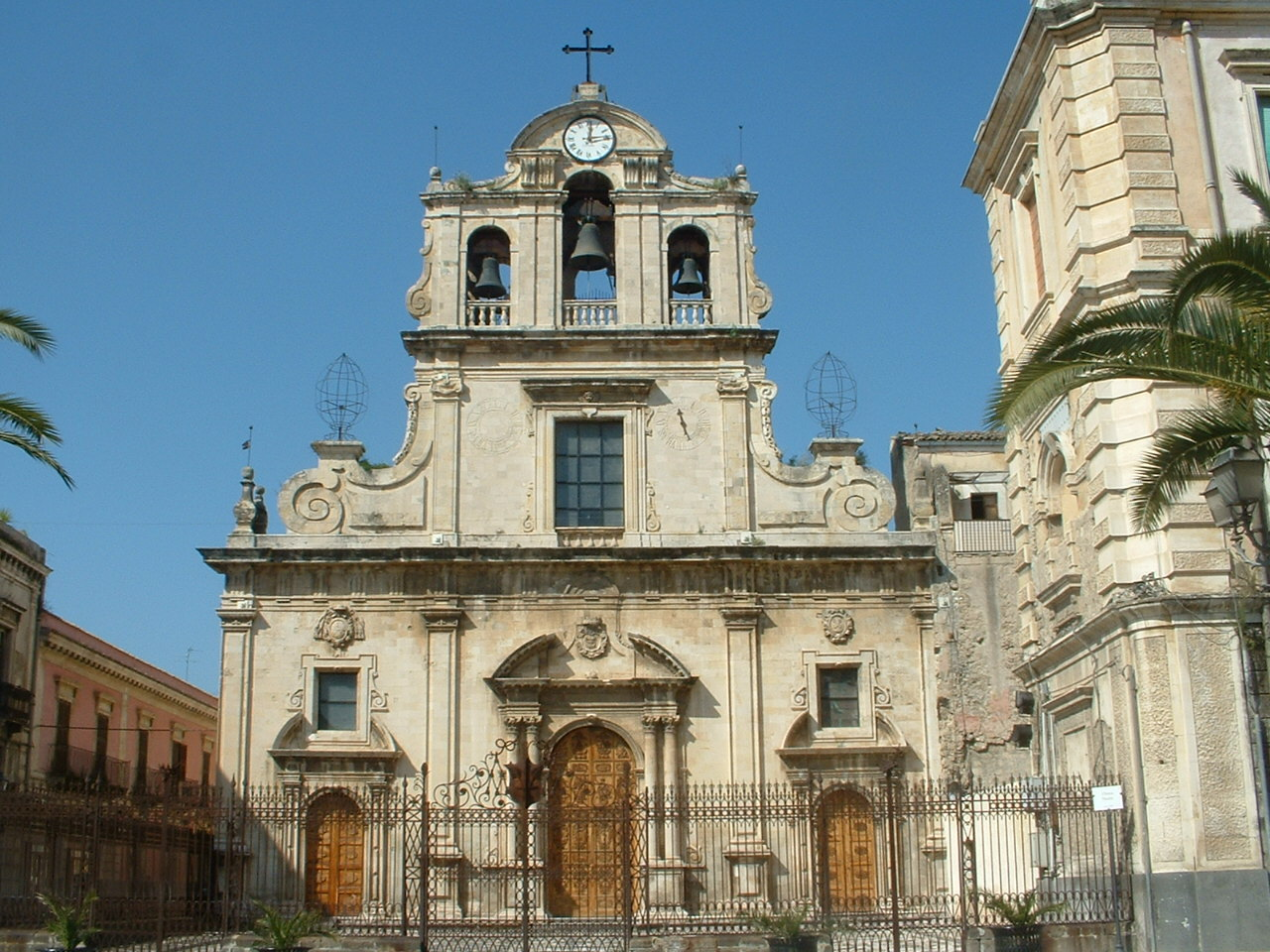
Mother church

- Santa Maria la Cava e Sant'Alfio: Baroque church built after the 1693 earthquake by Vincenzo Vella of Malta. It has a basilica plan with three naves; the three-order facade is from the 18th century. The central portal has scenes of the martyrdom of Saints Alphius, Philadelphus and Cyrinus. The interior houses a 12th-century Byzantine icon.
- Santissima Trinità e San Marziano: Church built over the ruins of the 16th-century Palazzo La Palumba. It has a noteworthy pavement in Caltagirone Ceramics (18th-century) and a polyptych of Antonello da Messina's school. The high altar tabernacle is made of lapis lazuli.
- Chiesa dell'Immacolata: 17th-century church, which houses a Romanesque lion sculpture, a Christ at the Column and the tombstone of Queen Mary (1402).
- San Luca Evangelista: The interior houses a canvas depicting St Francis of Assisi, attributed to the school of Bassano and other artworks. Next to the church are the remains of the Castle of Frederick II, the hypogeum of St. Lucy with 14th-century frescoes, the Crucifix Grottoes with frescoes from the 12th–17th centuries and the ruins of the old parish church of San Pietro (16th century).
- San Francesco di Paola: 18th-century church with a rare organ and artworks from churches which were destroyed by the 1693 earthquake.

=== Natural sites ===
- Lago di Lentini or Biviere: lake that extends not far away from the city, once drained but rebuilt in the 1970s in the old location. The lake is rich in vegetation and fauna.

== People ==
- Gorgias (c. 485 – c. 380 BC), pre-Socratic philosopher.
- Heracleides of Leontini (fl. 3rd century BC), tyrant.
- Hicetas of Leontini (died 338 BC), general and tyrant.
- Giacomo da Lentini, 13th century poet and notary at the court of Frederick II, leading exponent of the Sicilian School, considered the originator of the sonnet.
- Riccardo da Lentini, 13th century architect at the court of Frederick II.
- Arrigo Testa, 13th century poet at the court of Frederick II.
- Alaimo da Lentini (c. 1210 – 1287), nobleman.
- Thomas Agni da Lentini (died 1277), Bishop of Bethlehem, Archbishop of Cosenza, and Latin Patriarch of Jerusalem.
- Giovanni Luca Barberi (1452 – 1520), historian, lawyer and notary.
- Filadelfo Mugnos (1607 – 1675), man of letters and author of the Teatro genealogico delle famiglie nobili siciliane, titolate, feudatarie ed antiche del fedelissimo regno di Sicilia viventi ed estinte.
- Francesco Bonfiglio (1883 – 1966), neurologist and psychiatrist.
- Manlio Sgalambro (1924 – 2014), philosopher and writer.
- Luigi Briganti (1924 - 2006), partisan.
- Benedetto Vincenzo Nicotra (1933 – 2018), politician.
- Filadelfio Aparo (1935 – 1979), policeman, victim of mafia.
- Alfio Antico (born 1956), singer-songwriter.
- Jeffrey Jey (born 1970), singer and lead vocalist of the group Eiffel 65.
- Damiano Lia (born 1997), professional footballer.

== See also ==
- Carlentini
- Francofonte
- Agnone Bagni
- Syracuse, Sicily
- Catania

== Sources ==
- Valenti, Francesco (2007). Leontinoi. Storia della città dalla preistoria alla fine dell'impero romano (in Italian). Palermo: Publisicula.
