= Roberto Carnevale =

Italian composer, pianist and conductor

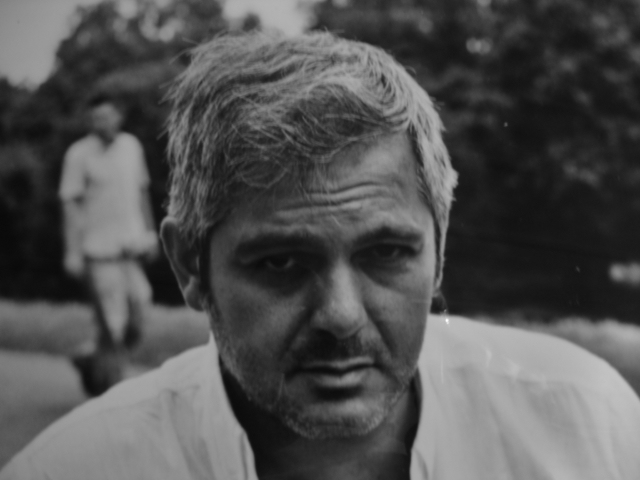
- Carnevale in 2008
- Born: 15 June 1966 (age 60); Catania, Italy
- Education: Accademia Musicale Chigiana
- Occupations: Composer; Conductor; Pianist; Academic teacher
- Organizations: Conservatorio Vincenzo Bellini

Roberto Carnevale (born 15 June 1966) is an Italian composer, pianist, conductor and academic teacher.

== Biography and career ==
Born in Catania, he started studying piano at the age of seven. He took a degree in Arts at the University of Catania and he attended the Accademia Musicale Chigiana in Siena. He studied under Roberto Bianco (piano), Franco Donatoni (composition), Salvatore Enrico Failla (musicology) and Ferdinand Leitner (conducting). He is Professor of History of Music and Assistant Headmaster at the Conservatorio Vincenzo Bellini, and Headmaster at the CEU. In 1988, he was awarded the international prize "Council of Europe".

His composition have been played all over the world by famous musicians and orchestras (Claudia Antonelli, Giovanni Sollima, Marco Betta, Tonino Battista, Riccardo Risaliti, Aldo Bennici, Vera Beths, Henk Guittart, Maurizio Ben Omar, Gidon Kremer, Graziella Concas, Marina Leonardi, Giorgio Magnanensi, Daniel Schweitzer, Logos Ensemble, Octandre Ensemble, Ensemble Modern, Klami Ensemble, Calamus Ensemble, Keldisc Group, L'Offerta Musicale Ensemble, Soloists of Santa Cecilia Academy, Soloists of Teatro La Fenice, Soloists of ORT, London Chamber Group, Ensemble Foriani, Ensemble Belliniano, West Chester University Orchestra, Amadeus Chamber Orchestra, Ploesti Philharmonic, Vilnius State Orchestra, etc.).

He is known for his use of multiple styles or techniques of music, sometimes within the same composition, and is seen as a postmodern characteristic. He explores a number of different areas of style and tone alongside the glittering, intricate, sonically alluring idiom that announced itself so strikingly in the I miei orologi (1995) for trio, an example of his flair for an openly mediterranean approach to instrumental sonority, articulated in cascading figuration and complex metres. His music of the 1990s continued to emphasize complex mechanical rhythms, often in a less densely chromatic idiom (tending to favor displaced major and minor triads and polymodal structures); his scores make huge technical demands on performers; sometimes, as in the case of Huaco for orchestra, creating parts that are so detailed they are likely impossible to realize completely. He views compositions as reification and formal structures of abstract ideas; but «he realises in a use of isolated sonorities, extended playing techniques, frequent silences and ironic quotation of previous music». Carnevale’s actual compositional approach rejects serialism and other generative methods of composing; he prefers instead to use systems only to create material and formal constraints. Carnevale's music combines the influences of serialism and American minimalism. His harmonic writing eschews the consonant modality of much minimalism, preferring post-war European dissonance, often crystallised into large blocks of sound.

Carnevale's music is published by LIM (Lucca), Verlag Neue Musik (Berlin), Suvini Zerboni (Milan), TEM-Taukay Edizioni Musicali (Udine), NEN (Palermo), CULC (Catania). His recordings appear on the Edizioni Carrara (Bergamo), Pongo Records (Paris), Suvini Zerboni (Milan), CIMS (Palermo), Pagano Editore (Naples), Union-Records (New York), NEN-CD Classica (Florence), etc.

== Works ==
- Elena o L’enigma della bellezza for flute, percussion, keyboard (1986),
- Herr Dr. Doppler. Studio divertimento for flute, guitar, cello, harpsichord (1987),
- Due Movimenti for piano (1987),
- Pedale for flute, violin, cello (1986),
- Cordialmente Suo… (I) for violin, viola, cello, harp, piano (1988),
- Istanze su Movil I (Omaggio ad Harold Gramatges) only to read (1989),
- Cordialmente Suo... (II) for piano 4 hands (1989),
- Hagamos un trato con Falla for harpsichord, flute, oboe, clarinet, violin, cello (1990),
- Huaco (Omaggio a Paolo Renosto) for orchestra (1990),
- Prit. Pif. Le piace Boulez? for recorder, flute, piano (1990),
- Zona rimozione for flute, piano (1990),
- Ludo-Ismi. Invenzioni e Cantabile appassionato for recorder, piano (1990),
- BachGoldbergVariationen. I Serie: Variationes 11, 15, 16, 14, 10 for piano foreword by Franco Donatoni (1991–1992),
- BachGoldbergVariationen. I Serie: Aria, Variationes 5 & 7 for piano (1991–92),
- Lectura BGV for flute, piano (1992),
- Strumenti (introduzione) for orchestra (1991),
- O1f9n7v5m for celesta, vibraphone, marimba, woodblocks, cello (1991),
- Apra prima for oboe, guitar, harp, vibraphone (1992),
- Lectura 1992 for clarinet, piano (1992),
- Linae. Prima stanza for 18 instruments (1992),
- The Right Hand for S., flute alto, piano, percussion (1992),
- È sempre la stessa cosa… for 2 violins, viola, cello, piano (1992),
- Accademia 90.91.92.93 for piano (1994),
- Aspanti… dr. (from Op. 47) for piano (1994),
- Come Inizio Molte Storie (from Variatio VII) for piano (1994),
- If*Alla (from Variatio VII) for piano (1994),
- Linae. Seconda stanza (con vista…) for ensemble (1993),
- È gradita un’Offerta for clarinet, viola, piano (1994),
- Linae. Terza stanza (con aria condizionata) for flute alto, oboe, clarinet, cello (1994),
- Notturno-Diurno for piano (1995),
- Linae. IV stanza (con doppi servizi…) for flute, flute alto, piano, double bass, drums (1994),
- Linae interne for 2 flutes, piano (1994–1995),
- Athenaeum for choir, violin, guitar, harpsichord, piano, percussion (1995),
- I miei orologi for clarinet, viola, piano 4 hands (1995),
- Stravinsky Cinque pezzi facili arr. for clarinet, viola, piano 4 hands (1995),
- Progression-Form (frattaglie!) for clarinet, piano (1995),
- Duetto. Omaggio a Denissow for guitar, piano (1996),
- Quartuccio for oboe, violin, viola, cello (1995),
- Toccata-Parodia for harpsichord (1995),
- Domina Stella lyrics by Francesco Tei for speaker, 2 flutes, 2 harps, celesta (1996),
- Exhortatio n. 1 for choir, clarinet, viola, piano (1996),
- Quintuccio for flute, oboe, clarinet, bassoon, horn (1997),
- Quintuccio for flute, oboe, clarinet, bassoon, horn (II vers. 2001),
- Linae VI stanza (con filodiffusione) for clarinet, (also electric guitar), viola, piano 4 hands (1997),
- Seiflautidolci for 6 recorders (1998),
- Traditional Jewish: Kolyn – Freylacher Bulgar – Rebn’s Waltz – Bay a Glezele Mashke arr. for clarinet, piano (1998),
- Duepertre for piano 6 hands (1997),
- Duepersei for 2 pianos 12 hands (1997),
- Quattro variazioni ancora sul tema di… for 2 piano, percussion (1998),
- Sei tavole per Corrado for piano (1998),
- La mia Sonata for piano (1999),
- Cadenze for the Piano Concert K.467 by Mozart (1999),
- Carnascialesca n. 1 for piano, organ, video, tape (2000),
- Weill: I’m a stranger here myself arr. for S, clarinet, violin, cello, double bass, piano (2000),
- Bernstein – Story n. 1 arr. for S, clarinet, violin, cello, double bass, piano (2000),
- Bernstein – Story n. 2 arr. for S, clarinet, violin, cello, double bass, piano (2000),
- Moussorgsky -Quadri-Frammenti n. 1 for wind orchestra (2000),
- Shostakovic: Valzer arr. for ensemble (2000),
- Sinfonia 2001: Odissea nello… for 23 wind orchestra (2001),
- Ve lo ricordate? for flute, oboe, clarinet, bassoon, horn, 2 pianos (2001),
- Il mio quartetto for 2 violins, viola, cello (2001),
- Bellini-Fest lyrics by Riccardo Insolia for speaker, 8 clarinet, 2 piano, percussion (2001),
- Movimentato n. 1 for 5 clarinets (2001),
- L’elefante e la pulce lyrics by Gianni Rigamonti for speaker, clarinet, violin, trumpet, trombone, piano 4 hands, percussion (2001),
- Finale per uno studio quasi da concerto for piano (2001),
- Belliniana n.1 for wind quintet, piano 4 hands (2001),
- Belliniana n. 2 for wind quintet, piano 4 hands (2002),
- Sogno d’una notte di… lyrics by Riccardo Insolia for speaker and orchestra (2002),
- Solo for cello, 3 marimbas, vibraphone (2002),
- Natale lunare for ensemble (2002),
- Mediterraneo for piano (2003),
- Eco d’un battito d’ali (from Farfalle by Francesco Pennisi) for 2 pianos, vibraphone (2003),
- Gli animali di Carnevale for flute, clarinet, 2 violins, viola, cello, cb, 2 piano, perc.(2003),
- Volo for 2 violins (2004),
- Vocalizzo for voice and piano (2004),
- Non l’avete già udito? for 2 pianos (2004),
- Arietta S-Canzonata (from L’elefante e la Pulce) for voice and piano (2004),
- Da-Solo for voice and piano (2004),
- Da-Mediterraneo for voice and piano (2004),
- Ennese for viola, piano, percussion (2004),
- Bach: Corale Wer nur den lieben Gott laebt walten (BWV691) arr. for piano (2004).

== Bibliography ==
- Enciclopedia Italiana dei Compositori Contemporanei, edit by Renzo Cresti, Pagano editore, 1997, IIt., pp. 126–127 (sub voce), ISBN 88-87463-07-7.
- AA.VV., «Archivio – Musiche del XX secolo», edit by Dario Oliveri, pref. Paolo Emilio Carapezza, CIMS, 1995, IV, pp. 68–75.
- Il clavicembalo nella musica contemporanea italiana, edit by D. Saviola e M.P. Jacoboni, pref. Mario Baroni, catalogo e ricerca a cura dell’Associazione Clavicembalistica Bolognese sotto l’alto patrocinio del Ministero per i Beni e le Attività Culturali.
