= San Francesco di Paola =

San Francesco di Paola may refer to:

- Francis of Paola (1416–1507), Italian mendicant friar, founder of the Roman Catholic Order of Minims
- San Francesco di Paola Bridge, Cosenza, Italy

== Churches in Italy ==
- San Francesco di Paola ai Monti, Rome
- San Francesco di Paola, Florence
- San Francesco di Paola, Lentini
- San Francesco di Paola, Milan
- San Francesco di Paola, Naples
- San Francesco da Paola, Oria
- San Francesco di Paola, Palermo
- San Francesco da Paola, Turin
- San Francesco di Paola, Venice
