= Aenesidemus, tyrant of Leontini =

5th-century BC tyrant of Leontini, Sicily

Aenesidemus (Aenesidemos or Enesidemus), the son of Pataecus of Gela in Sicily, Magna Graecia, was made tyrant of Leontini in 498 BC by Hippocrates of Gela after aiding the latter in his effort to conquer southeastern Sicily. Aenesidemus likely continued to hold Leontini at least until the death of Hippocrates in 491 BC.

The inclusion of Aenesidemus as a character in the ancient Greek novel The Wonders Beyond Thule by Antonius Diogenes provides the general fictive or dramatic date for these events.
