= Monarchia Sicula =

Claimed religious right of Sicilian monarch

The monarchia Sicula (Sicilian monarchy) was a historical, but unduly inflated titular right exercised from the beginning of the sixteenth century by the secular authorities of Sicily (presently in Italy), according to which they claimed final jurisdiction in Catholic matters, independent of the Holy See.

They premised this right on an old Papal privilege. The oldest document advanced in support of their claim was a Papal Bull of 5 July 1098 by Pope Urban II to Count Roger I of Sicily. The Pope agreed not to appoint a Papal legate to Sicily against the will of the Count and declared his intention of permitting the Count to execute ecclesiastical acts in Sicily that were ordinarily executed by a legate (quinimmo quae per legatum acturi sumus, per vestram industriam legati vice exhiberi volumus). Pope Paschal II, in a Bull of 1 October 1117 addressed to Count Roger II of Sicily, confirmed and clarified this privilege. He gave Roger II the same power "in the sense that if a Papal legate be sent thither, that is a representative of the Pope, you in your zeal shall secure the execution of what the legate is to perform" (ea videlicet ratione, ut si quando illuc ex latere nostro legatus dirigitur, quem profecto vicarium intelligimus, quae ab eo gerenda sunt, per tuam industriam effectui mancipentur).

Pope Urban II thus had granted Apostolic legatine authority to the secular authority of Sicily; according to the Bull of Pope Paschal II this meant that, when a Papal legate was appointed to Sicily to exercise jurisdiction in certain ecclesiastical matters as the Papal representative, he was required to communicate the nature of his commission to the secular authority, which then would execute the Papal acts so commissioned in place of the legate (legati vice). In both instances it was a question not of a jurisdiction of the Prince of Sicily independent of the Holy See, but only of the privilege of the secular authority to execute ecclesiastical acts as a deputy of the Catholic Church; in other words, the sovereign of Sicily was privileged, but also obligated, to execute Papal regulations in his jurisdiction (of Sicily).

As a result of the feudal relation between the Princes of Sicily and the Pope, ecclesiastical matters there were more political in character than elsewhere, and the Catholic Church in Sicily was reduced to the greatest dependence upon secular authority. However, up to the beginning of the sixteenth century, the privilege bestowed by Pope Urban II was never invoked or even mentioned. When Ferdinand II of Aragon became King of Sicily, his secretary, Giovanni Luca Barberi of Noto, Sicily, undertook to collect the documents by which the rights of the Kings of Sicily, both in ecclesiastical and secular matters, were determined. To this collection, denominated the Capibrevio, was joined a collection of documents titled the Liber Monarchiae (Book of the Monarchy), meant to prove that the Sicilian monarchs always had exercised spiritual authority. The Liber Monarchiae first published the legatine privilege conferred by Pope Urban II.

The Kings promoted it as a legal basis of the purported authority that they had long exercised over the local Catholic Church. They also used it to extend their pretensions that, by virtue of an old Papal privilege, they possessed ecclesiastical authority in spiritual matters independent of the Pope. Despite doubts expressed concerning the authenticity of the document, Ferdinand declared on 22 January 1515: "As for the Kingdom of Sicily, where we exercise the supervision of spiritual as well as of secular affairs, we have made sure that we do so legitimately". In consequence of such an exorbitant claim, disputes arose between the Popes and the Sicilian monarchs. Pope Clement VII negotiated with Charles V, Holy Roman Emperor concerning the "monarchia Sicula" ("Sicilian monarchy"), but without success. In 1578 Philip II of Spain tried vainly to obtain a formal confirmation of the right from Pope Pius V. In 1597 the King appointed a special permanent judge ("Judex Monarchiae Siculae") to give final decisions in the highest ecclesiastical causes, an appeal from his judgment to that of the Pope being forbidden. The Judex Monarchiae Siculae claimed the general right to visit convents, supreme jurisdiction over the Sicilian Bishops and the Clergy, and the exercise of a number of episcopal rights, such that Papal authority was almost wholly excluded.

When Caesar Baronius, in an excursus on the year 1097 in the eleventh volume of his Annales Ecclesiastici (Rome, 1605), produced good reasons against the genuineness of the bull of Pope Urban II and especially against the legality of the monarchia Sicula, a violent feud arose, and the Court of Madrid, Spain forbid the eleventh volume from the whole of the Spanish Empire. Baronius omitted the excursus in the second edition of the "Annales" (Antwerp, 1608), but published instead a special Tractatus de Monarchia Sicula. During the War of the Spanish Succession another serious conflict arose between the Papal Curia and the Spanish court in regard to this alleged legatine authority. The occasion of the dispute was a question of ecclesiastical immunity, and the differences continued after Count Victor Amadeus II of Sardinia had been made King of Sicily by the Treaty of Utrecht and had been crowned in Palermo in 1713.

On 20 February 1715, Pope Clement XI declared the monarchia Sicula null and void, and revoked the privileges attached to it. The monarchs of Sicily rejected the declaration, and, when a few years later the island came under the rule of Charles VI, Holy Roman Emperor, Pope Benedict XIII negotiated with him, with the result that the Decree of Pope Clement XI was withdrawn and the monarchia Sicula restored, but in an altered form. The King, through the concession of the Pope, could now appoint the Judex Monarchiae Siculae, who was at the same time to be the delegate of the Holy See and empowered with final jurisdiction of religious matters. On the basis of this concession the Kings of Sicily demanded more and more far reaching rights in ecclesiastical matters, so that fresh struggles with the Holy See constantly arose. The situation grew more unbearable.

Pope Pius IX tried in vain by amicable adjustments to enforce the essential rights of the Holy See in Sicily. Giuseppe Garibaldi, as "Dictator" of Sicily, claimed the rights of the Papal legate, and, during the ceremony in Palermo Cathedral, caused legatine honours to be given him. In the bull Suprema of 28 January 1864, which was not published with the prescriptions for its execution until 10 October 1867, Pope Pius IX permanently revoked the monarchia Sicula. The government of Victor Emmanuel II of Italy protested, and the Judex Monarchiae Siculae, Rinaldi, refused to submit, for which he was excommunicated in 1868. Article 15 of the Italian law of guarantees of 13 May 1871 explicitly revoked the monarchia Sicula and the question was thus finally disposed of.
