= Heracleides of Leontini =

Heracleides (Ancient Greek: Ἡρακλείδης) was a tyrant or ruler of Leontini, Magna Graecia, at the time when Pyrrhus of Epirus landed in Sicily, in 278 BC. He was one of the first to offer submission to that monarch.
