= Benedetto Vincenzo Nicotra =

Italian politician (1933–2018)

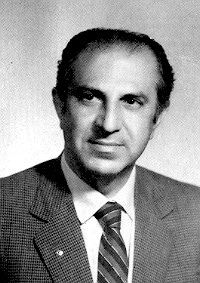
- Benedetto Vincenzo Nicotra Camera Foto Camera dei Deputati

Member of the Chamber of Deputies
- In office May 19, 1972 – April 14, 1994

Personal details
- Born: March 17, 1933 Lentini, Syracuse, Italy
- Died: October 21, 2018 (aged 85) Rome, Italy
- Party: Christian Democracy (1972–1994)
- Education: University of Catania (Law)
- Occupation: Judge, Politician

Benedetto Vincenzo Nicotra (5 April 1933 – 21 October 2018) was an Italian politician.

== Biography ==
A native of Lentini born on 5 April 1933, Nicotra studied law and began his career as a lawyer in 1956. He assumed several political positions on the municipal and regional levels before serving on the Chamber of Deputies from 1983 to 1994, as a member of Christian Democracy.
