= Giovanni Luca Barberi =

Italian historian, lawyer and notary

Giovanni Luca Barberi (1452–1520) was an Italian historian, lawyer and notary. He was born and lived in Sicily all of his life.

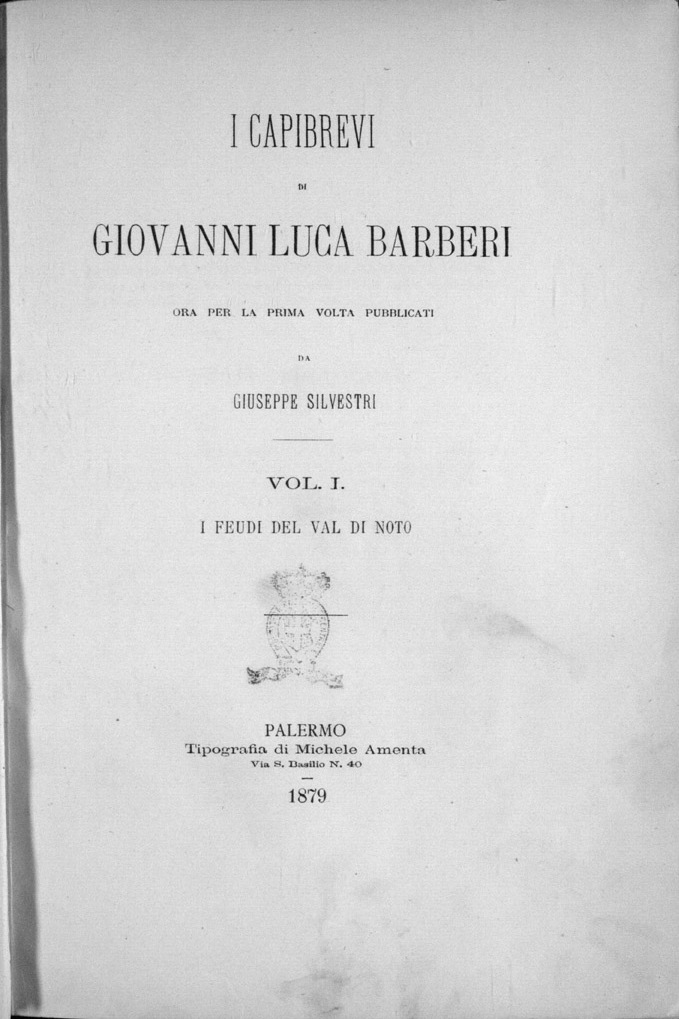
I Capibrevi di Giovanni Luca Barberi, 1879 edition

His writing was particularly important in compiling the list of feudal and noble titles in Sicilian history.

== Biography ==
Biographical information on Giovan Luca Barberi is scarce and uncertain, starting already with the surname itself, which also has the variants Barbieri, Barberio, De Barberiis, and Barberius.

His date of birth or place is unknown; one tradition, dating back to the 17th century, has him a native of Noto, another of Lentini, and others have him a native of Syracuse, Sicily. A recent study, published in Archivio Storico per la Sicilia Orientale (No. 2, 2018), proved without equivocation, with the help of a copy of a notarial deed attached to the trial for his inheritance, that Barberi was born in Lentini.

From the Capibrevius, his legal culture, particularly versed in Feudalism law, is evident, which is not sufficient to get him mentioned in the list of jurists.

The first certain date concerning him is 13 November 1484, when he was appointed Commissioner of the Royal Grand Court. Beginning in 1491, he is Master Notary of the Royal Chancery. In 1497, he became Usher of the Provveditore dei reali castelli and again Procuratore Fiscale del Regio Patrimonio.

While holding this post, he found, in examining the baronage titles, that many Baron held fiefs without any title and raised the possibility that the fiefs might be revoked from the Royal Treasury. He communicated the discovery to Viceroy Ramón de Cardona, who, seeing the great profit that could come to the crown, instructed him to carry out the investigation and then sent him to Spain to make present to King Ferdinand II of Aragon the rights of the Crown over those fiefs that the barons held illegitimately. The sovereign approved, and Barberi threw himself headlong into the search.

In 1509, he was able to present the results of his work to the King of Spain: the Capibreve della secrezia (drafted in 1506), the Magnum Capibrevium (1508), and some investigations related to church-state relations collected in the Dignitates Ecclesiasticae (1506) and the codex De Monarchia (1508).

The extent of the sovereign's approval was proportionate to the irritation Barberi's work aroused in the Sicilian nobility. Indeed, the beneficiaries were not always able to support their rights with solid evidence. Their reasons were often entrusted to the luck of finding the titles in the various offices of the Kingdom and to the objectivity of Barberi, who, having made himself a “promoter of all royal rights and prerogatives,” carried out his research in a very rigid manner.

As early as the Parliament of Palermo on 7 August 1508, the first protest against his actions began. The Parliament had been convened by Ferdinand to present his request for grants to finance the enterprise against the Berbers pirates infesting the Mediterranean Sea coast. The barons declared themselves willing to give a grant of 300,000 Guilder in exchange for certain graces, including being freed from Barberi's harassment and having Alfonso's chapter reconfirmed.

== Works ==
- I Capibrevi (in Italian). Vol. 1. Palermo: Amenta. 1879.
- I Capibrevi (in Italian). Vol. 2. Palermo: Amenta. 1886.
- I Capibrevi (in Italian). Vol. 3. Palermo: Amenta. 1888.

== Bibliography ==
- Davide Alessandra, L'eredità di Giovan Luca Barberi 1523-1579, in Archivio Storico per la Sicilia Orientale, n. 2, FrancoAngeli, 2018
- Enrico Mazzarese Fardella, J. Luca de Barberiis Liber de secretiis, Giuffrè, 1966
- Lelio I. Prestifilippo. Tesi di Laurea. Un esemplare del "magnum capibrevium" di Giovan Luca Barberi. I feudi di Agira, Assoro, Barrafranca, Cerami, Gagliano e Pietraperzia. Università degli Studi di Catania, Facoltà di Giurisprudenza, Academic year 1993/94 (supervisor Prof. F. Migliorino)
- G. Catalano. Studi sulla Legatia Apostolica in Sicilia. Edizioni Parallelo 38, Reggio Calabria 1973
- G. Silvestri. I Capibrevi di Giovanni Luca Barberi. Società Siciliana per la Storia Patria, Tipografie Michele Amenta, Palermo 1879–1888, ristampa anastatica, Palermo 1985
  - Volume 1 - I feudi di Val di Noto, 1879.
  - Volume 2 - I feudi di Val Demone, 1886.
  - Volume 3 - I feudi di Val di Mazzara, 1888.

== See also ==
- Monarchia Sicula
