= San Luca Evangelista, Lentini =

Roman Catholic parish church in Italy

Coordinates: 37.28458°N 15.00047°E

San Luca Evangelista
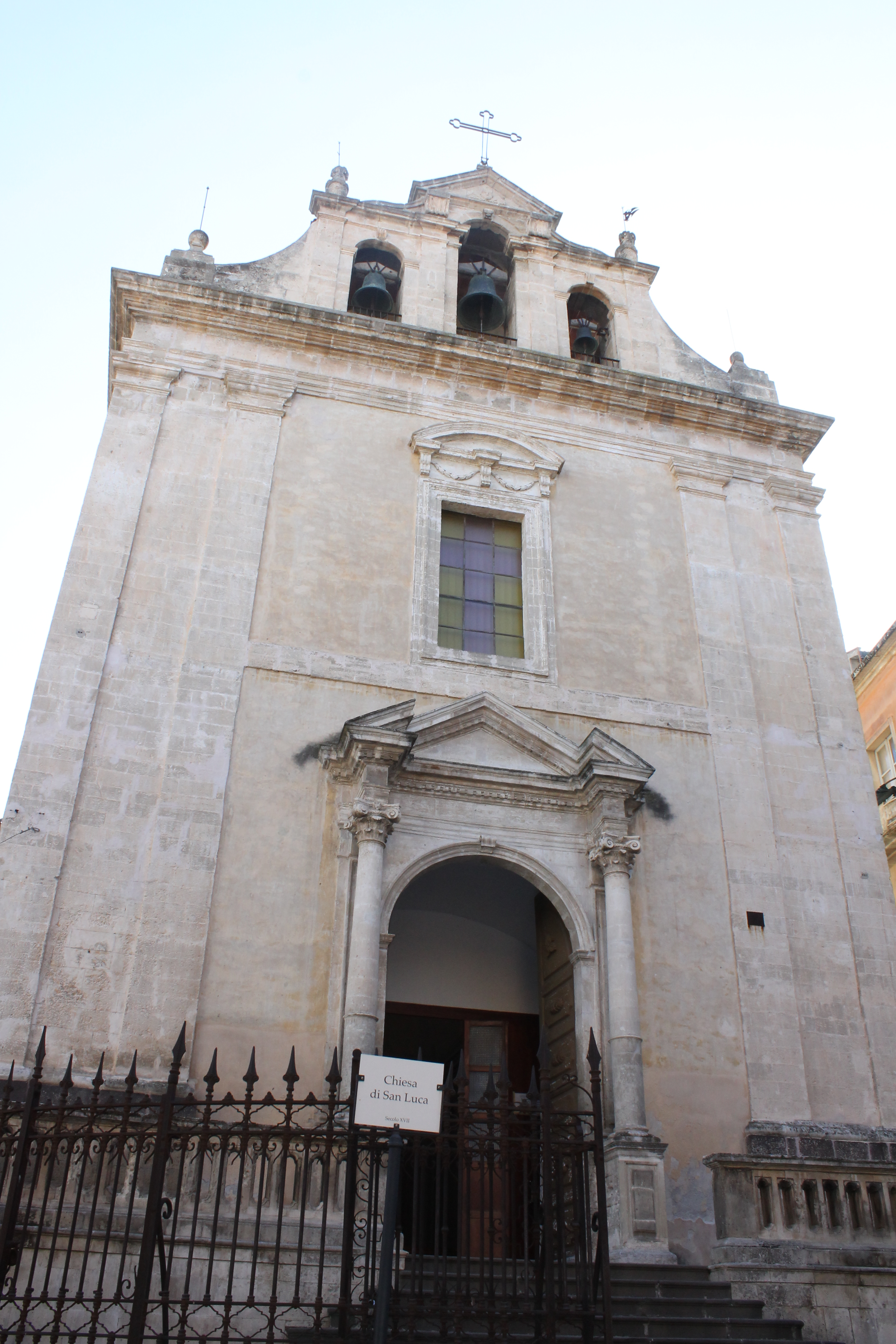
- Facade

Religion
- Affiliation: Catholic Church

Location
- Location: Lentini, Italy
- Interactive map of San Luca Evangelista

Architecture
- Type: Church
- Style: Baroque

San Luca Evangelista is a baroque-style, Roman Catholic parish church located on piazza San Luca, between via Cairoli and via Bricinna, in the town of Lentini, province of Syracuse, Sicily, Italy.

== History and description ==
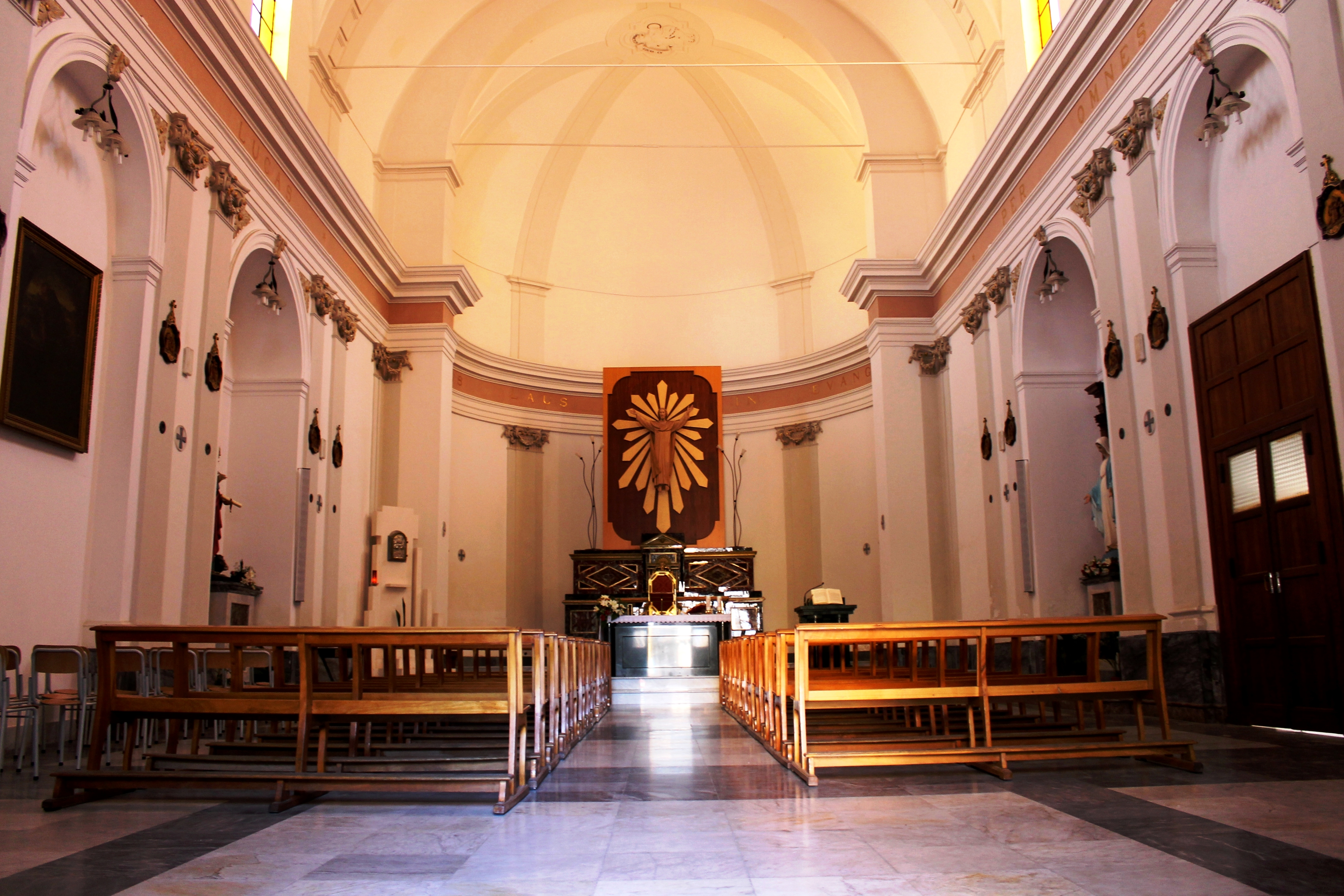
Nave towards apse.

The present church was rebuilt after the 1693 Sicily earthquake using white stone. The interior houses an altarpiece depicting the crucifixion attributed to followers of Tintoretto, and another depicting Francis of Assisi attributed to followers of Jacopo Bassano. There is also a Birth of the Virgin (1760) by Francesco Gramignani Arezzi. The church suffered damage from the 1990 earthquake, which has since been repaired. The interiors are presently a sober neoclassical single nave.
