= Filadelfo Mugnos =

Italian historian and poet

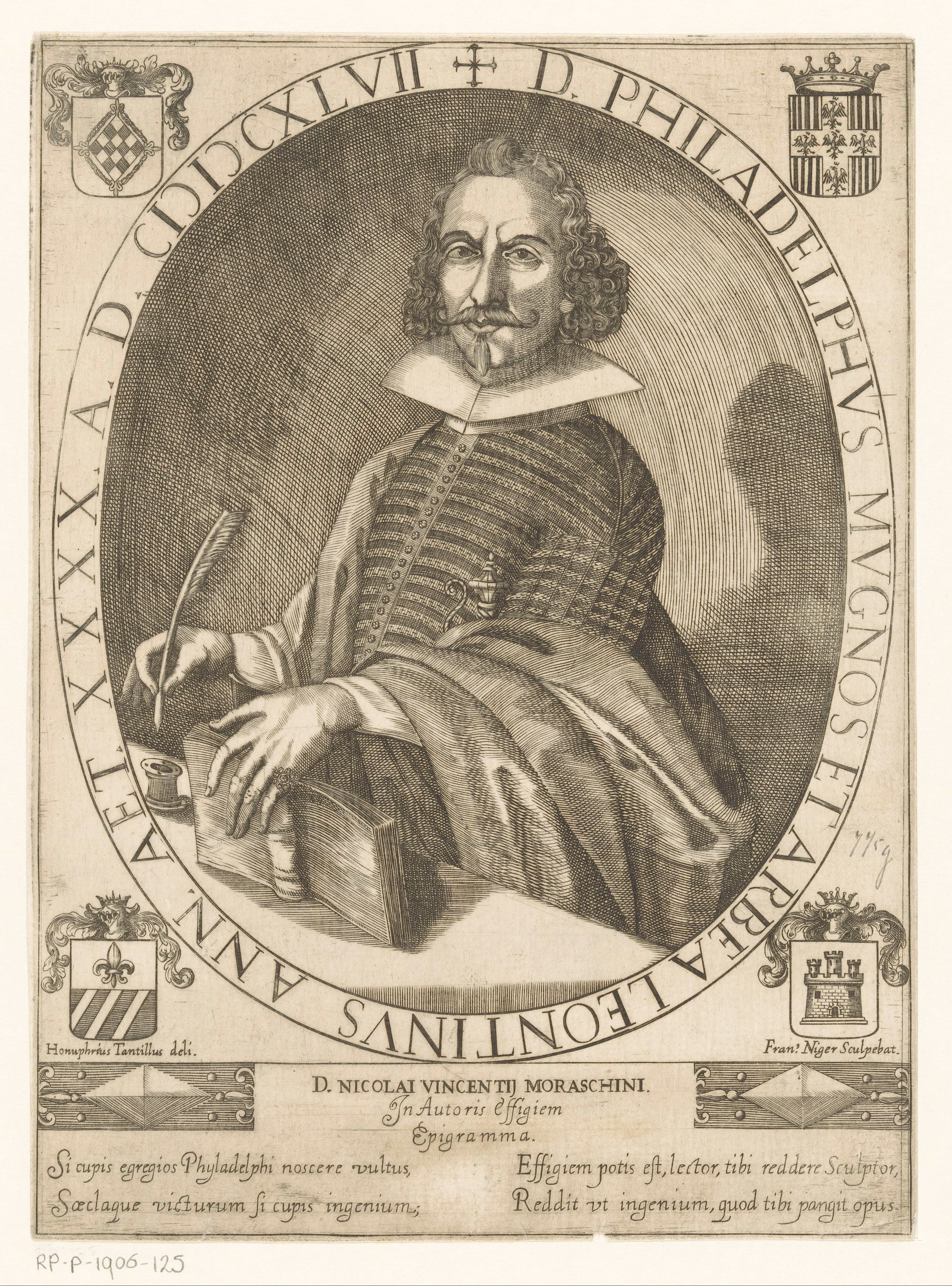
- Mugnos in December of 1646
- Born: 1607; Lentini, Kingdom of Sicily
- Died: 28 May 1675 (aged 67–68); Palermo, Kingdom of Sicily
- Resting place: San Francesco d'Assisi, Palermo
- Occupations: historian, genealogist, poet and man of letters
- Movement: Baroque
- Honours: Military Order of Christ

Filadelfo Mugnos (1607 – 28 May 1675) was an Italian historian, genealogist, poet, and man of letters.

== Biography ==
Filadelfo Mugnos was born in Sicily at Lentini in 1607 but moved while young to Palermo. He obtained a doctorate in law at the University of Catania. He was made a member of the Portuguese chivalric Order of Christ and various learned academies of the day.

Of his numerous historical works, the best known is the Teatro genealogico delle famiglie nobili, titolate, feudatarie ed antiche del fedelissimo regno di Sicilia viventi ed estinte, published in three volumes between 1647 and 1670, which for many centuries has been the mainstay for knowledge aboutSicilian nobility.

Filadelfo Mugnos died in Palermo on 28 May 1675.

== Works ==
- Il trionfo leontino, o vero, il meraviglioso Martirio o Morte delli gloriosi Martiri Alfio, Filadelfo e Cirino, A. Martarello, Palermo 1640
- Proserpina Rapita, Idillio, Giacobbe Matteo, Messina 1643
- Discorso contro coloro che dicono di essersi ritrovata un'arte nuova di compor Tragedie (inserita nel tomo II delle tragedie di Ortensio Scammacca), Pietro Coppola, Palermo 1645
- Raguagli istorici del Vespro Siciliano, Pietro Coppola, Palermo 1645 (on line ed. 1645) (on line ed. 1669)
- Teatro genologico delle famiglie nobili, titolate, feudatarie ed antiche del fedelissimo regno di Sicilia viventi ed estinte, Pietro Coppola, Palermo 1647 (on line)
- Lico e Lisso, favola Boscareccia. Roma: presso gli eredi di Lodovico Grignani. 1650.
- Aggitamento accademico sopra l'origine e progresso della lingua latina, Roma 1650
- Annali del Regno di Sicilia con i successi d'anno in anno dal principio della sua abitazione sino all'anno 1649, Palermo 1650
- Historia dell'augustissima famiglia Colonna, Venezia 1658 (on line)
- Il Nuovo Laerzio [...] Parte prima, dove si leggono le Vite de' Filosofi, Poeti, Oratori, Leggisti, Historici, et d'altre famose persone nelle scienze litterali del mondo, e precisamente del nostro Regno di Sicilia, innanzi e dopo Christo Redentore S.N. infino à gli anni del 1600, etcet. In Palermo 1664
- Discorso laconico della famiglia Petrucci, Novello De Bonis, Napoli 1670
- Albero genealogico delle famiglie Molli, 1674
- Teatro della nobiltà del Mondo, Novello De Bonis, Napoli 1680
