= Alfio Antico =

Italian singer-songwriter, percussionist, and actor

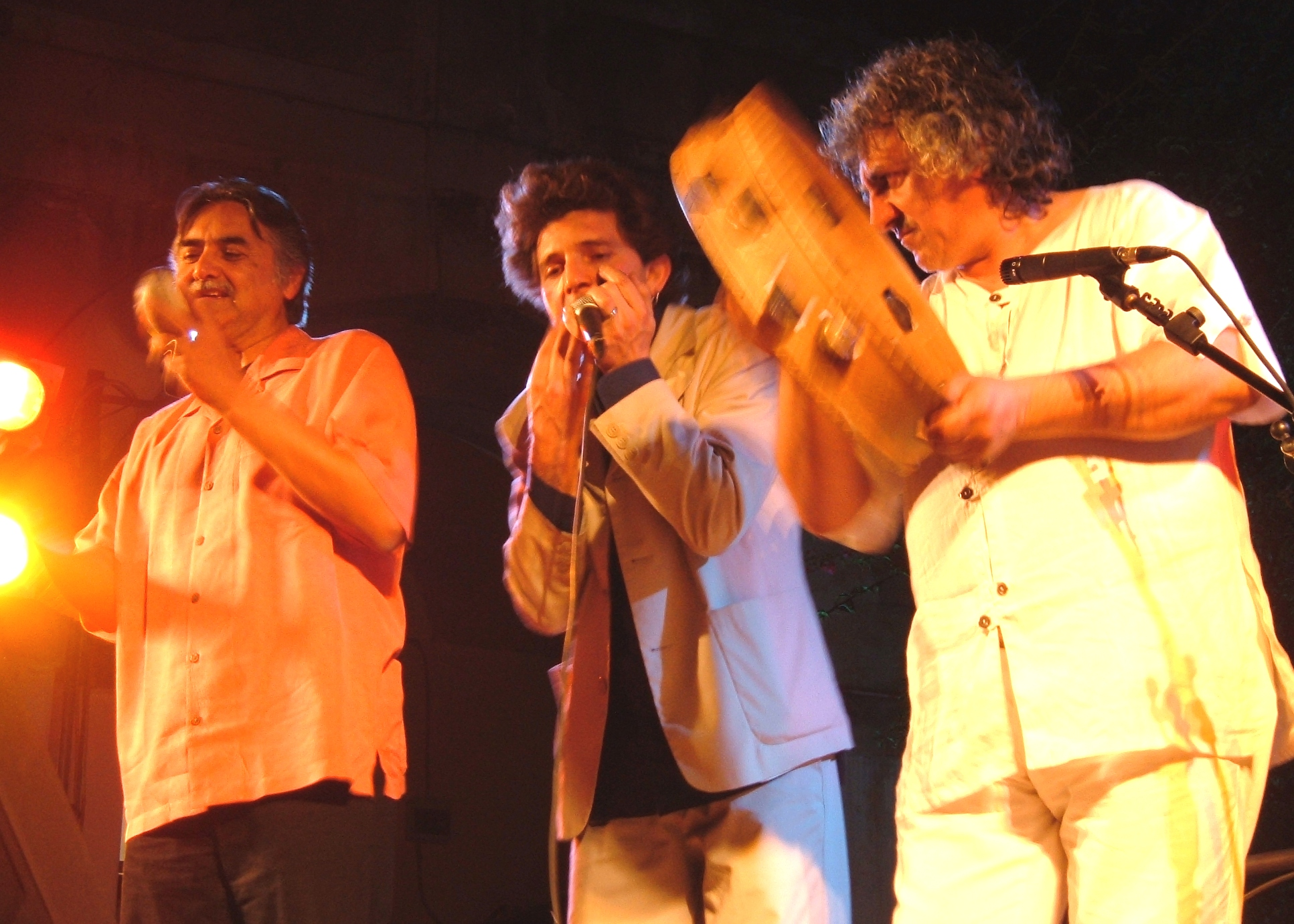
- Alfio Antico (right) performing with Glen Velez and Luca Recupero

Background information
- Born: November 22, 1956 (age 69); Lentini, Sicily, Italy
- Origin: Italy
- Genres: Folk, world music, folktronica
- Occupations: Musician, singer-songwriter, actor
- Instruments: Tamburo a cornice, voice, guitar
- Years active: 1970–present
- Labels: Ala Bianca, Onyx, Rai Trade, Narciso Records

Alfio Antico (born 22 November 1956) is an Italian singer-songwriter, percussionist, and theatrical actor, regarded as one of the world’s foremost interpreters of the tamburo a cornice (frame drum). His work blends traditional Sicilian pastoral culture with contemporary folk and world music.

== Early life ==
Antico was born in Lentini, Sicily. He lived as a shepherd until the age of 18, surrounded by pastoral life and immersed in oral traditions passed down by his grandmother.

== Career ==
=== Beginnings ===
In the 1970s, while performing in Florence, Antico was discovered by Eugenio Bennato and invited to join the folk group Musicanova. This marked his entry into the Italian folk scene.

=== Collaborations ===
Over his career, Antico has collaborated with Fabrizio De André, Lucio Dalla, Carmen Consoli, and Vinicio Capossela. He has also contributed to theatrical productions alongside leading Italian actors and directors.

=== Solo work ===
Antico has released multiple albums, both studio and live, often featuring his self-crafted tamburi decorated with ancient symbols. His music combines traditional rhythms with experimental sounds, earning him recognition in the European folk and world music scenes.

== Legacy ==
Antico is considered both a guardian of traditional Sicilian music and an innovator who has expanded its reach into contemporary genres.
