= San Francesco di Paola, Lentini =

Church in Lentini, Italy

Coordinates: 37.28275°N 14.99677°E

San Francesco di Paola
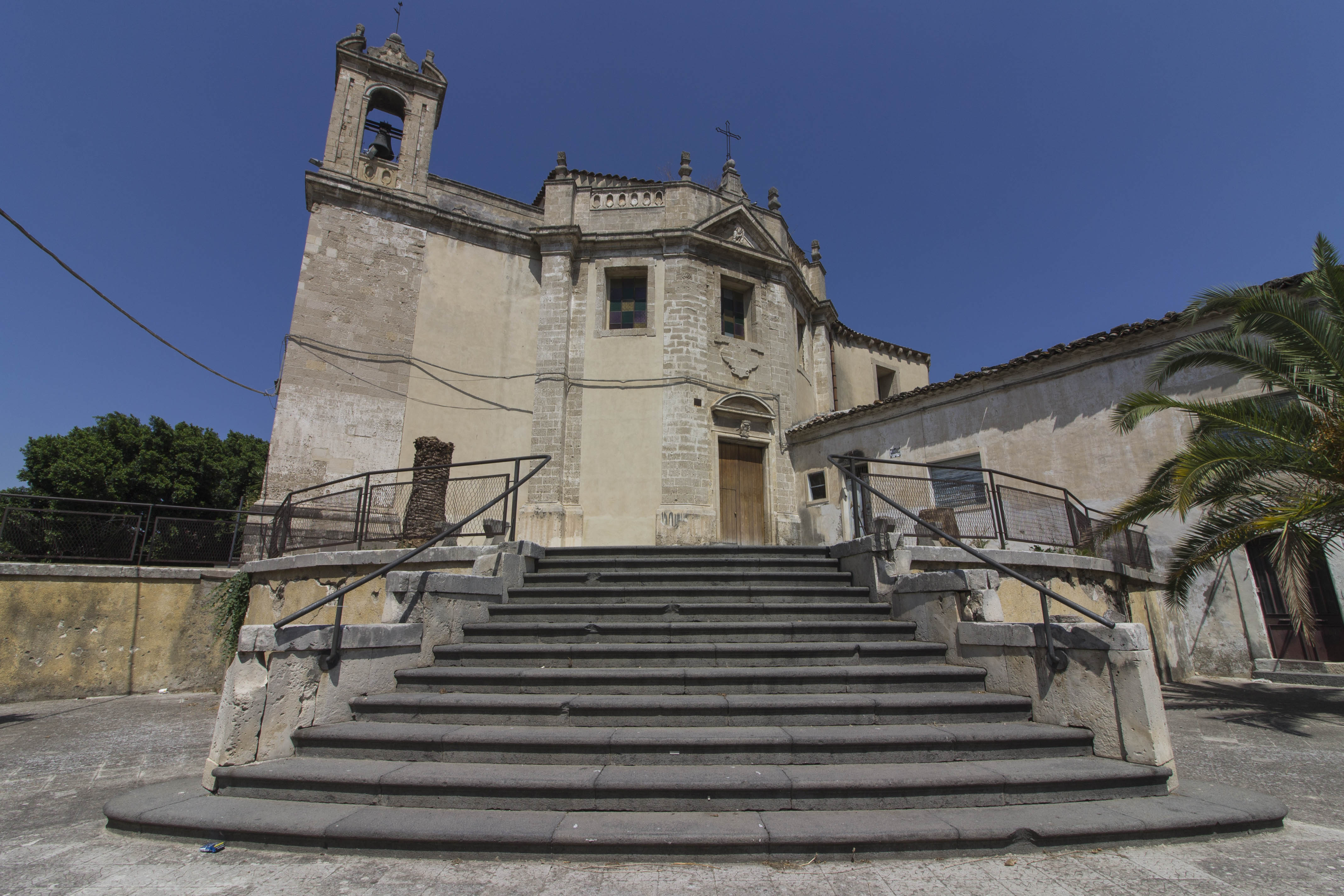
- Facade and stairs leading to church

Religion
- Affiliation: Catholic Church

Location
- Location: Lentini, Italy
- Interactive map of San Francesco di Paola

Architecture
- Type: Church
- Style: Baroque

San Francesco di Paola is a Roman Catholic parish church located at the intersection of via Conte Alaimo and Piazza Guido Rossa, in the town of Lentini, province of Syracuse, Sicily, Italy.

== History and description ==
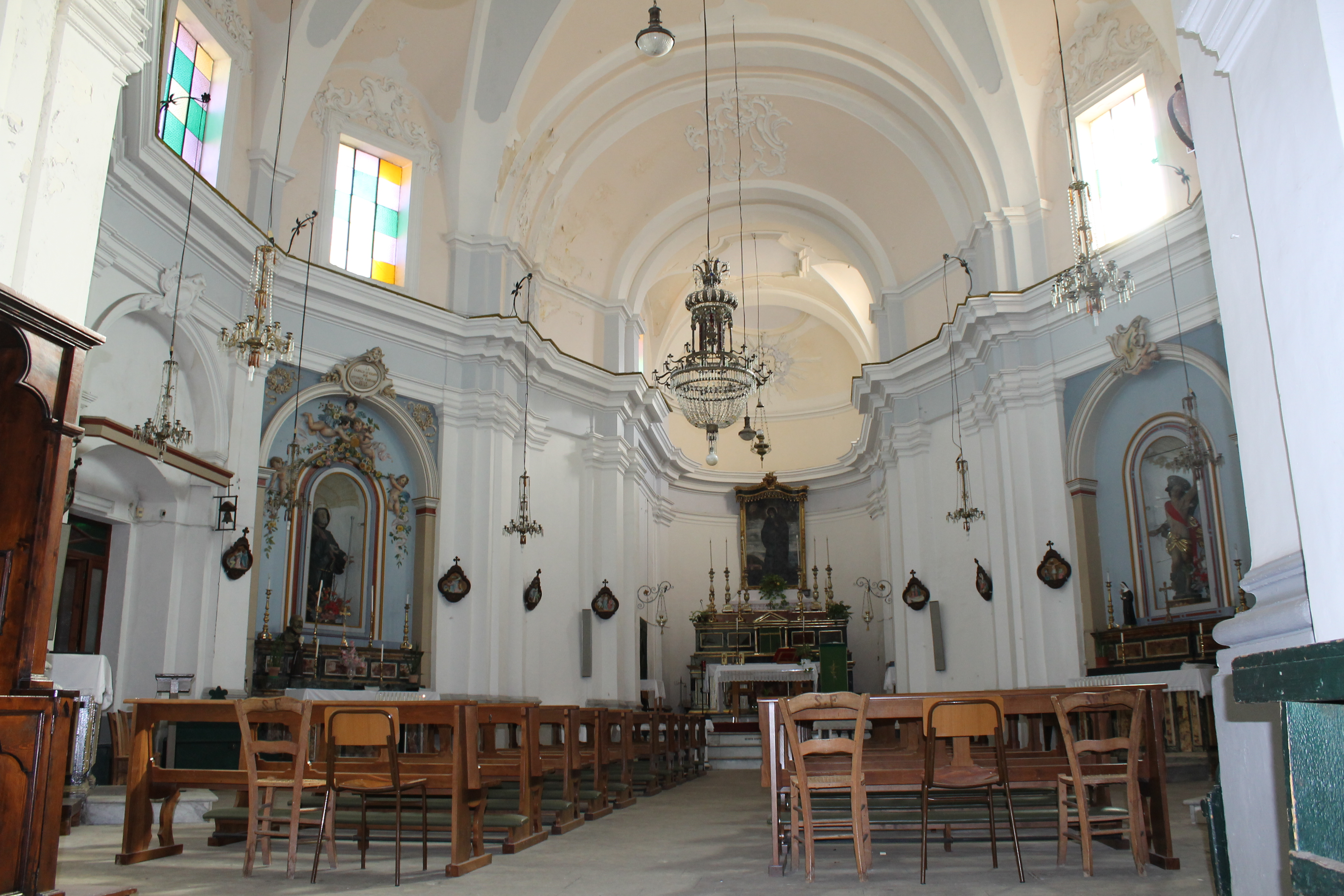
Central nave looking towards apse

The present church was rebuilt after the 1693 Sicily earthquake and completed in 1762. The church is accessed by scenic broad stairs. The facade is simple.

It hosts artworks collected from other churches devastated by the earthquake.
