= Alphius, Philadelphus and Cyrinus =

Catholic saints

Saints Alphius, Philadelphus and Cyrinus (Alfio, Filadelfo and Cirino)
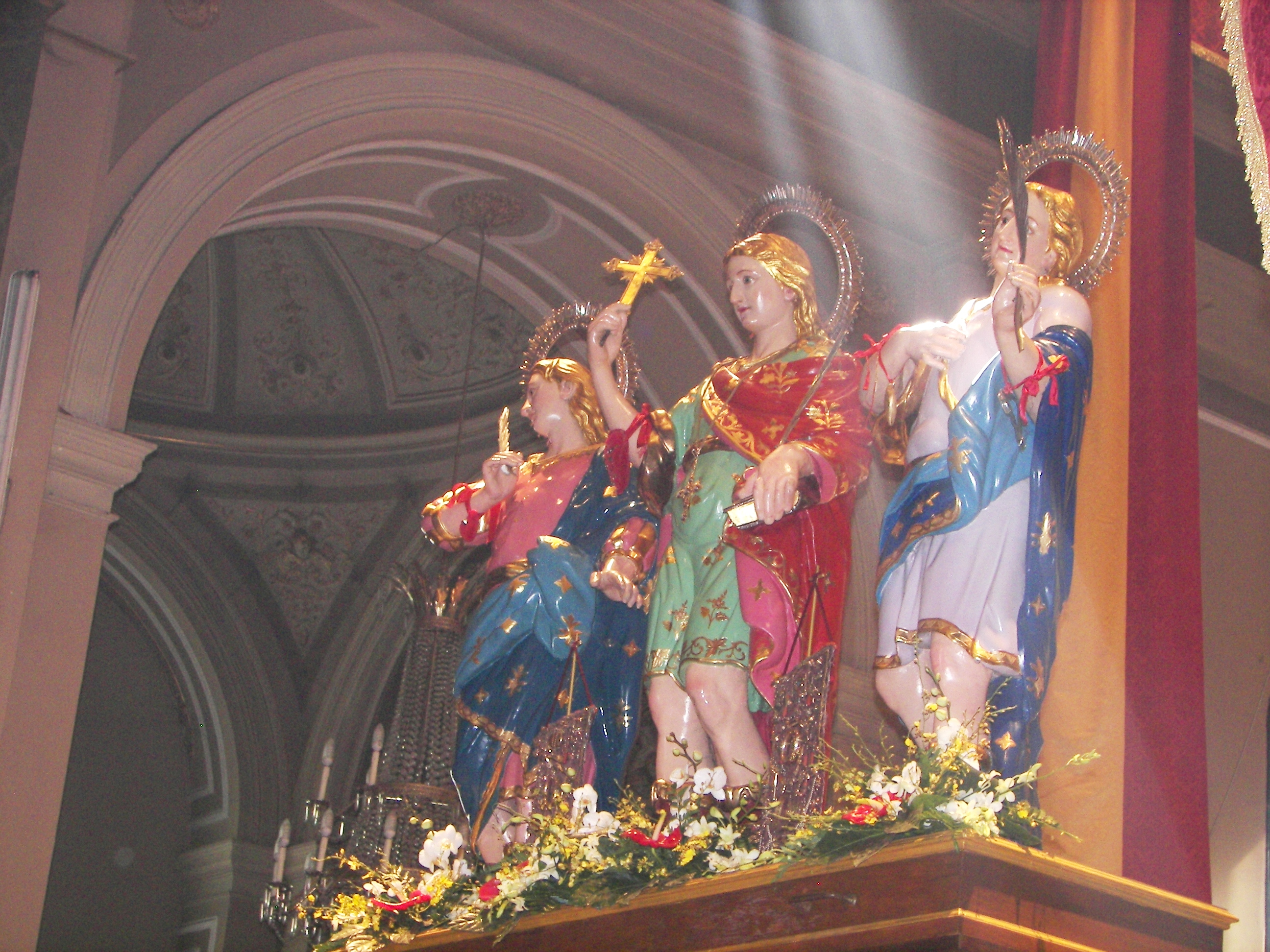
- Statues of Saints Alphius, Philadelphus, Cyrinus
- Born: Prefetta, Gascony
- Died: 253 AD
- Venerated in: Roman Catholic Church; Eastern Orthodox Church
- Beatified: May 10, 253 AD, Lentini, Trecastagni
- Feast: 10 May in Lentini, Trecastagni, Sant'Alfio a Vara (Sicily) Labor Day Weekend Lawrence, Massachusetts, USA
- Attributes: Alphius, Philadelphus, Cyrinus are depicted as three young men
- Patronage: Lentini; Trecastagni

Saints Alphius, Philadelphus and Cyrinus (Italian: S.S. Alfio, Filadelfo e Cirino), martyrs in the Byzantine traditions of southern Italy, were three brothers from Vaste, in the diocese of Otranto, who died with their mother, Benedicta, during the persecution of Decius, ca 251 AD. The details concerning these martyrdoms are traditional, drawn up at a later date in the Benedictine Acta of Saint Alphius.

According to the Acta, Alphius, Philadelphus, Cyrinus, ranging in age from nineteen to twenty-two, and their mother Benedicta were arrested with other Christians during the persecutions under Decius. They were taken to Pozzuoli, near Naples, where one of the Christians, Onesimus, was executed. The brothers were taken on to Sicily, where they were martyred at Lentini; there they are among the patron saints. Alphius had his tongue torn from his mouth. Philadelphus was burned on a stake and Cyrinus was boiled alive in oil. No details of her execution are given for Benedicta. Their feast day is 10 May in Trecastagni, Sicily and Labor Day Weekend in Lawrence, Massachusetts, USA. The town of San Fratello, in Sicily, is named after them.

== Sources ==
- F. Halkin, 1987. Six inédits d'hagiologie Byzantine. (Subsidia hagiographica)
- Catholic on-line: Saint Alphius
- (in Italian) Sant’Alfio santiebeati.it
- (in Italian) SS. Alfio - Filadelfo e Cirino: L'attesa è già festa
