= Santissima Trinità e San Marziano, Lentini =

Building in Lentini, Italy

Coordinates: 37.28275°N 14.99677°E

Santissima Trinità e San Marziano
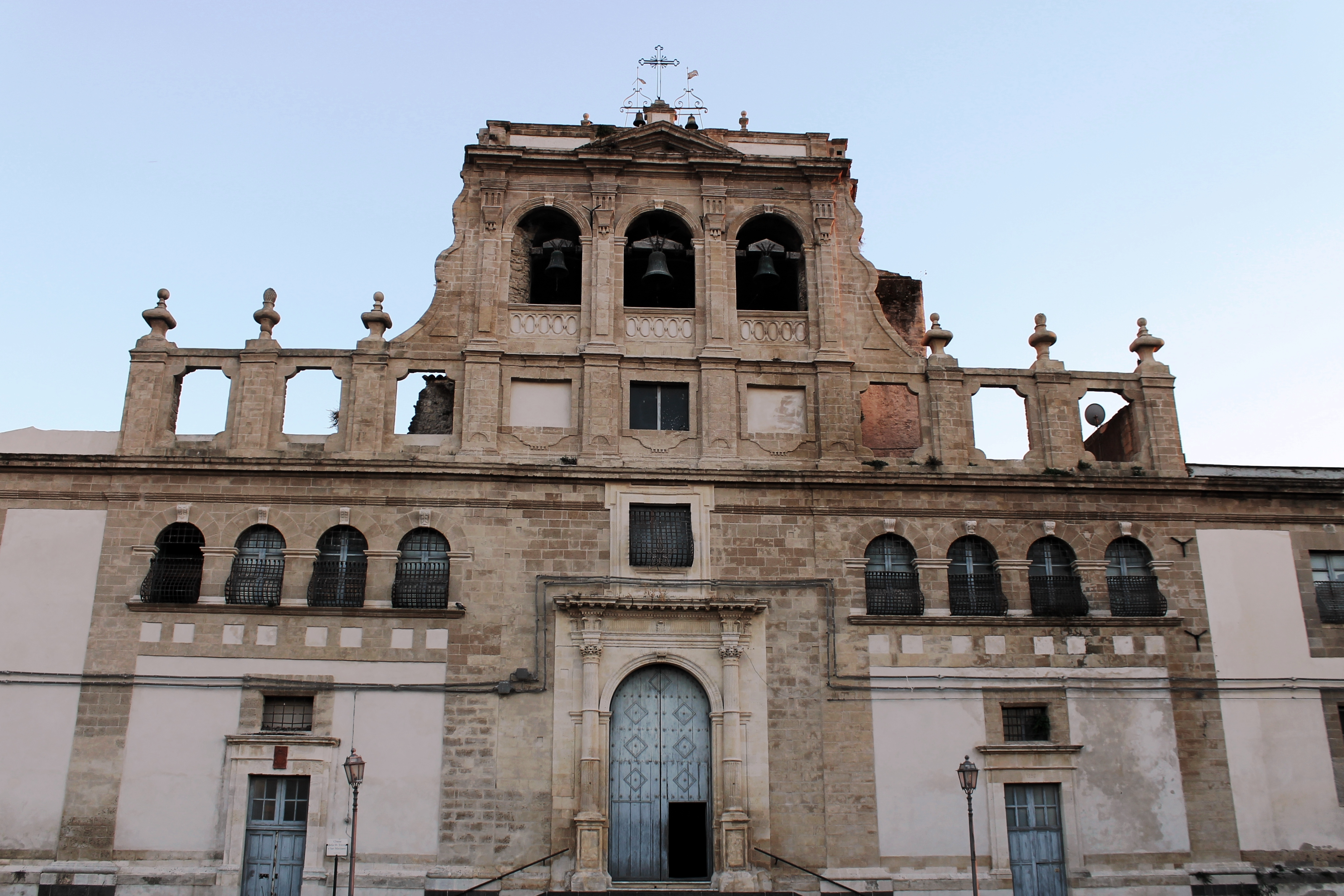
- Facade

Religion
- Affiliation: Catholic Church

Location
- Location: Lentini, Italy
- Interactive map of Santissima Trinità e San Marziano

Architecture
- Architect: Vincenzo Vella da Malta
- Type: Church
- Style: Baroque

The Chiesa of Santissima Trinità e San Marziano (Church of the Holiest Trinity and St Marziano) is a Roman Catholic church located on via San Francesco d'Assisi, 3, just south of the town centre of Lentini, province of Syracuse, Sicily, Italy.

== History and description ==
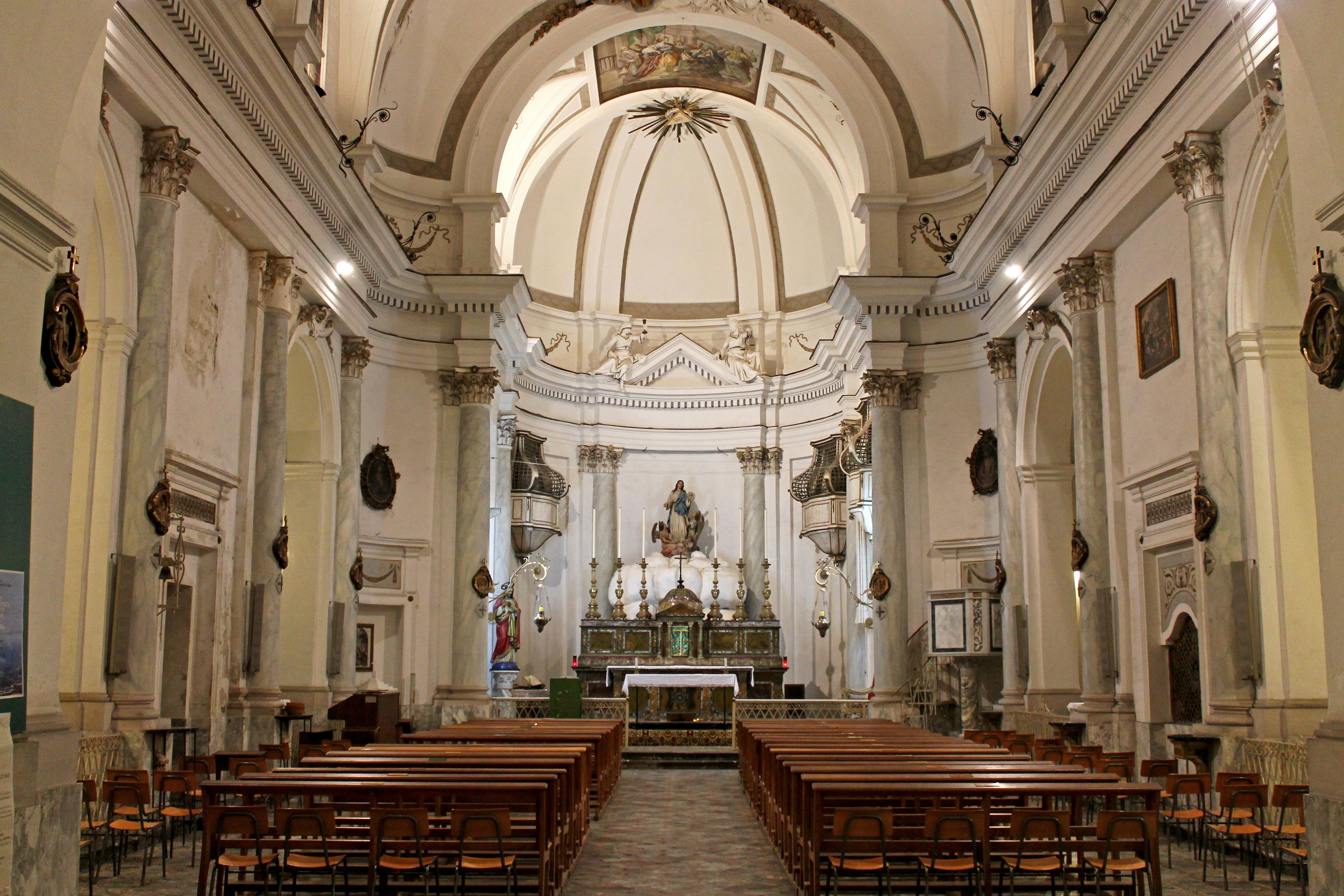
Central nave

The present church was built after the 1693 Sicily earthquake inserted into the ruins of the 16th-century palace of La Palumba, which then became a Clarissan order monastery. The design is attributed to Vincenzo Vella. The facade interrupts the palace front and is topped by a sail-like bell tower. The portal is accessed through a brief double staircase. The second story has a row of windows with metal grills used by the cloistered nuns to look out on the piazza in front of the church.

The interior has a ceiling fresco depicting the Glory of the Trinity with St Marziano, Clare, Benedict, and Francis by Sebastiano Lo Monaco; one of the altarpieces was painted by Giuseppe Velasco. The main altar utilizes polychrome precious stone, including lapis lazuli. The church is paved with majolica tiles with floral designs from Caltagirone. The church also houses a polyptych from the 16th-century attributed to Giovanni Antonio Gangi.
