= Lago di Lentini =

Lake in Sicily, Italy

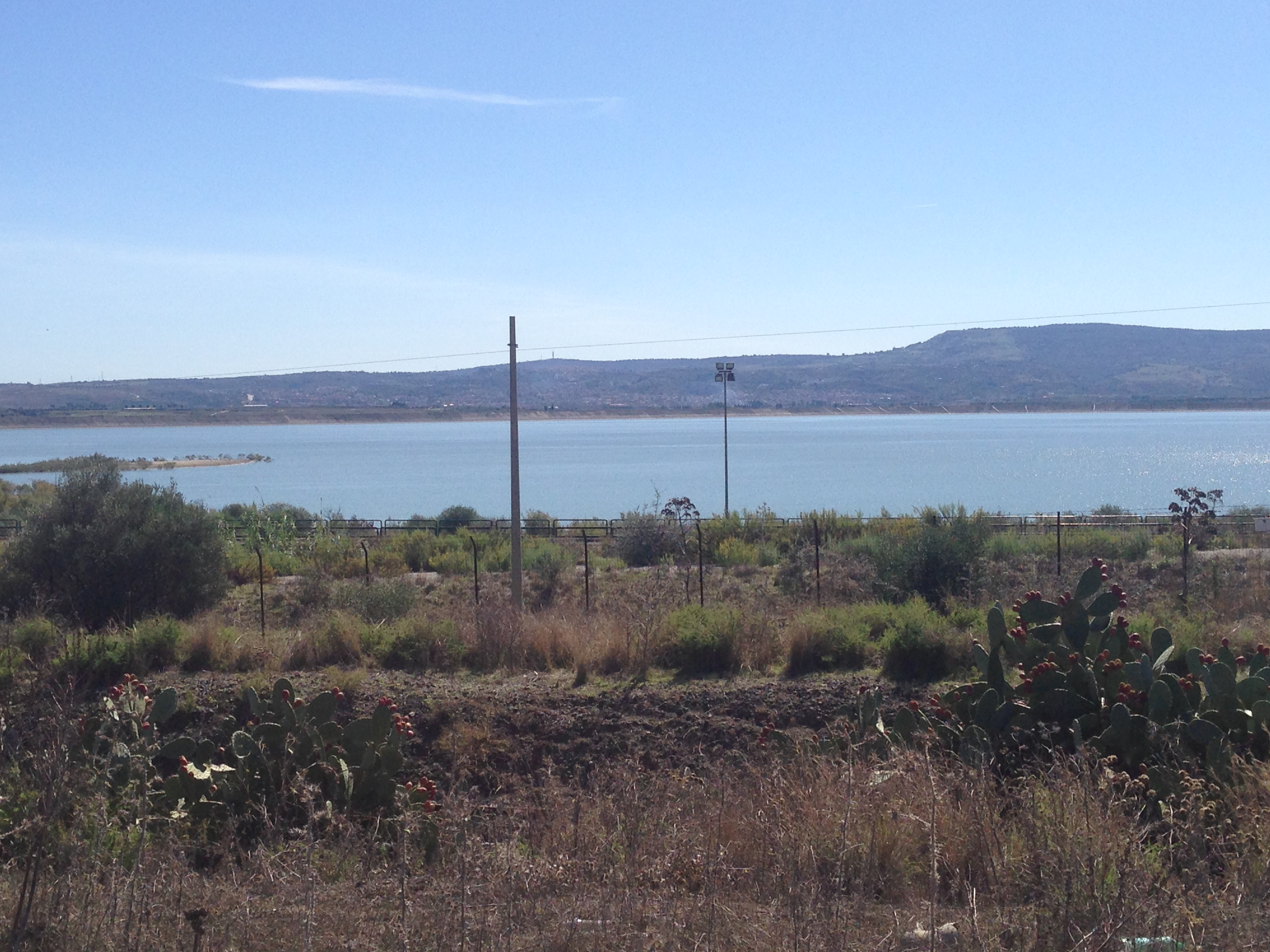
- The Biviere

- Location within Sicily
- Location: Province of Syracuse, Sicily
- Coordinates: 37°19′23″N 14°57′00″E
- Type: Artificial
- Primary inflows: Trigona
- Primary outflows: San Leonardo
- Basin countries: Italy
- Surface area: 12 km^{2} (4.6 sq mi)
- Water volume: 0.127 km^{3} (0.030 cu mi)
- Shore length^{1}: 20 km (12 mi)
- ^{1} Shore length is not a well-defined measure.

The Lago di Lentini, also called Biviere, is a lake near Lentini in the Province of Syracuse, Sicily, Italy. It is the largest lake on the island.

== History ==
The origin of the lake is attributed to the Knights Templar between the end of the 12th and the start of the 13th century. They blocked the bed of the river Trigona-Galici before it merged into the river San Leonardo so as to create a space for hunting and fishing.

During the 19th century, increased attention was paid to the fact that the lake was the cause of the spread of malaria during warm seasons. Therefore, a process of reclamation was started in the 20th century and the lake was dried out in the 1930s. The reclamation continued for about 30 years and the lake disappeared in the 1970s. In the late 1970s, the lake was rebuilt using the public fund Cassa per il Mezzogiorno. The new lake is smaller but deeper and has become rich in vegetation and fauna.
