= Agnone Bagni =

- Frazione
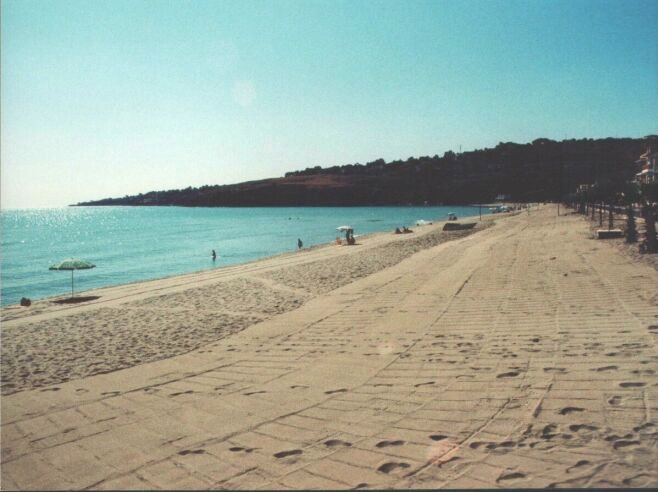
- Beach of Agnone Bagni

- Location of Agnone Bagni in Italy
- Coordinates: 37°19′51″N 15°05′17″E
- Country: Italy
- Region: Sicily
- Province: Syracuse (SR)
- Comune: Augusta
- Elevation: 34 m (112 ft)

Population (2011)
  - Total: 120
- Time zone: UTC+1 (CET)
  - Summer (DST): UTC+2 (CEST)
- Postal code: 96011
- Dialing code: (+39) 095

Agnone Bagni (Sicilian: Agnuni) is a southern Italian beach resort and hamlet (frazione) of Augusta, a municipality part of the Province of Syracuse, Sicily.

In 2011, it had a population of 120.

== Geography ==
Agnone Bagni is located by the Ionian Sea coast of the island of Sicily and is 15 kilometres (9.3 mi) from Augusta.
