= Marina Leonardi =

Italian pianist and composer

Marina Leonardi (born 1970) is an Italian pianist and composer. Leonardi was born in Catania, Italy and studied piano with Oria Dell’Angelo, and composition with Alexander Mullenbach, Giovanni Ferrauto, Alessandro Solbiati and Eliodoro Sollima. After completing her studies, Leonardi took a position as professor of composition at the Vincenzo Bellini Musical Institute in Catania. Her compositions have been performed internationally.

== Works ==
Leonardi is known for prepared piano works. Selected compositions include:

- Postludio for piano (2008)
- Interludio for two pianos (2008)
- Tre Pezzi for orchestra (2007)
- Duo for piano and percussions (2007)
- Rubaijat for soprano and flute (2006)
- Itinera for ensemble (2006)
- Giochi for violin and piano (2005)
- Rubaijat for ensemble (1996)
