= List of ancient Greek tyrants =

This is a list of tyrants from Ancient Greece.

== Abydus ==
- Daphnis, c. 500 BC under Darius I (pro-Persian)
- Philiscus, c. 368–360 BC (assassinated)
- Iphiades, 360–? BC

== Agrigentum (Acragas) ==
- Phalaris, 570–554 BC (overthrown and roasted)
- Telemachus, after 554 BC
- Alcamenes, 6th/5th century BC
- Alcandros (Alcander), 6th/5th century BC
- Theron, 488–472 BC
- Thrasydaeus, 472 BC (expelled and executed)
- Phintias, c. 288–279 BC
- Sosistratus, 279–277 BC. Later tyrant in Syracuse

== Alabanda ==
- Aridolis, 480 BC (POW)
- Amyntas, after 480 BC

== Ambracia ==
- Gorgus, son of Cypselus, fl. 628–600 BC
- Periander, until 580 BC, son of Gorgus and grandson of Periander of Corinth
- Archinus, 6th century BC

== Amastris ==
- Amastris, until 284 BC
- Eumenes, 284 – c. 270 BC (hands city over to Kingdom of Pontus)

== Argos ==
- Laphaes, 6th century BC
- Pheidon, around 550 BC
- Perilaus, c. 546 BC
- Archinus, c. 395 BC
- Aristippus the Elder, after 272 BC
- Aristomachos the Elder, before 250–240 BC (assassinated)
- Aristippus, 240–235 BC (killed in action)
- Aristomachus the Younger, 235–229 BC (resigned), 224–223 BC (tortured and executed)

== Assos & Atarneus ==
- Eubulus, before 351 BC
- Hermias, 351–342 BC

== Astacus ==
- Evarchus, c. 430–420 BC

== Athens ==
- Cylon, 632 BC (stoned)
- Pisistratus, 561 BC, 559–556 BC and 546–528 BC
- Hippias, 527–510 BC
- Theramenes, Critias, and Charicles leading members of the Thirty Tyrants 404–403 BC
- Lachares, 300–294 BC
- Aristion, 88–86 BC (executed)

== Byzantium ==
- Ariston, c. 513 BC, pro-Persian, participated in the Scythian campaign of Darius I
- Pausanias the Regent, c.477–476 BC
- Clearchus of Sparta, 411–409 BC, 404–401 BC

== Cardia ==
- Hecataeus, fl. 323 BC

== Camarina ==
- Psaumis of Camarina, fl. c. 460 BC

== Cassandreia ==
- Apollodorus, 279–276 BC (executed)

== Catane ==
- Euarchus, 729 BC–?, founder of Catane
- Deinomenes the Younger, fl. 470–465 BC
- Mamercus of Catane, 345–338 BC

== Chalcis (Euboea) ==
- Tynnondas, c. 580 BC
- Antileon, 6th century BC
- Mnesarchus, before 354 BC
- Callias, c. 354–350 BC, c. 343–330 BC
- Taurosthenes, c. 330 BC

== Chersonese ==
- Miltiades the Elder, 555–519 BC
- Stesagoras, 519–516 BC (assassinated)
- Miltiades, 516–510 BC, 496–492 BC

== Chios ==
- Strattis, fl. 513–480 BC

== Cibyra ==
- Moagetes, fl. 190 BC

== Corcyra ==
- Lycophron (?), before 587 BC
- Cleonymus, 303/02 BC

== Corinth ==
- Cypselus, 657–627 BC
- Periander, 627–587 BC
- Psammetich (Psammetichus, named after Psamtik I), 587–584 BC
- Timophanes, 364 BC (assassinated)
- Alexander, 253–247 BC
- Nicaea, 247–245 BC (married)

== Cos ==
- Scythes, late 6th century BC
- Cadmus, resigned 494 BC
- Nicias of Cos, 1st century BC
- Nicippus, 1st century (with Nicias)

== Croton ==
- Cleinias, c. 504–495 BC
- Menedemus

== Cumae ==
- Aristodemus, c. 505–490 BC

== Cyme ==
- Aristagoras, fl. 513–493 BC

== Cyprus ==
- Nicocreon, 4th century BC

== Cyrene ==
- Ophellas, 312–308 BC (assassinated)
- Lycopus, c. 163 BC
- Nicocrates, c. 51 BC (assassinated)
- Leander, c. 50 BC (arrested)

== Cyzicus ==
- Aristagoras, c. 513 BC

== Dardanos ==
- Mania, killed by her son-in-law c. 399 BC

== Elatea ==
- Mnason, 4th century BC

== Elea ==
- Demylus, 5th century BC
- Nearchus, c. 430 BC

== Elis ==
- Aristotimus, 272 BC (assassinated)

== Ephesus ==
- Melas the Elder, 7th century BC, brother-in-law to king Gyges
- Pythagoras, son of Miletus, 6th century BC
- Melas the Younger, son of Pythagoras, son-in-law of king Alyattes
- Pindarus, son of Melas, around 560 BC, overthrown by his cousin king Croesus
- Aristarchus, sent from Athens, c. 545–540 BC, to rule instead of Melas III
- Pasicles, 540–530 BC, killed when returning from a feast.
- Aphinagorus, fl. 530 BC
- Comas, fl. 530 BC
- Athenagoras, late 6th century BC
- Phanes
- Melancomas, c. 500 BC
- Hegesias, before 323 BC (assassinated)
- Melancomas II, fl. 214 BC

== Epidaurus ==
- Procles, 640 BC

== Eretria ==
- Themison, fl. 366 BC
- Plutarch, c. 355–350 BC (expelled)
- Hipparchus, c. 345 BC
- Automedon, c. 345 BC
- Cleitarchus, 345–341 BC (expelled)

== Gela ==
- Cleander, 505–498 BC (assassinated)
- Hippocrates, 498–491 BC
- Gelon, 491–485 BC
- Hieron I, 485–466 BC
- Polyzalus, fl. c. 476 BC

== Halicarnassus ==
- Artemisia I of Caria, fl. 480 BC
- Lygdamis II of Halicarnassus, fl. 469–444 BC

== Heraclea Pontica ==
- Clearchus, 365–353 BC (assassinated)
- Satyrus, 353–? BC
- Timotheus, 352–337 BC
- Dionysius, 337–305 BC
- Amastris, 305–284 BC (drowned by her sons)
- Oxyathres, 305–284 BC
- Clearchus, 305–284 BC

== Hermione ==
- Xenon, stepped down 229 BC

== Himera ==
- Terillus, early 5th century BC

== Keryneia ==
- Iseas, 275 BC (resigned)

== Lampsacus ==
- Hippoclus, c. 513 BC
- Aeantides, fl. 515–510 BC
- Astyanax, before 360 BC, assassinated

== Larissa ==
- Medius, fl. 395 BC

== Leontini ==
- Panaetius, c. 615 – c. 609 BC
- Aenesidemus, 498–491 BC
- Hicetas, c. 347–338 BC
- Heracleides, fl. 278 BC

== Lindos ==
- Cleobulus, 6th century BC

== Locri ==
- Dionysius the Younger, 356–346 BC

== Megalopolis ==
- Aristodemus the Good, c. 262–252 BC (assassinated by the "philosopher tyrannicides" Ecdemus and Damophanes)
- Lydiadas, c. 245–235 BC (joined the Achaean League)

== Megara ==
- Theagenes, c. 620–600 BC

== Messana ==
- Scythes, c. 494 BC
- Cadmus, c. 494–490 BC
- Anaxilas, c. 490–476 BC
- Micythus, c. 476–467 BC (retired)
- Leophron, c. 467–461 BC (popular revolt)
- Hippon, c. 338 BC
- Cios the Mamertine, c. 269 BC (POW)

== Messene ==
- Phyliades, before 336 BC (?)
- Neon, son of Phyliades (expelled in 336 after Philip II died, but restored by Alexander) after 336 BC (?)
- Thrasymachus, son of Phyliades (expelled in 336 after Philip II died, but restored by Alexander) after 336 BC (?)

== Methymnae ==
- Aristonicus, before 332 BC (tortured and executed)

== Miletus ==
- Amphitres, late 8th or 7th century BC
- Thrasybulus, 7th century BC
- Thoas, 6th century BC
- Damasanor, 6th century BC
- Histiaeus, 518–514 BC
- Aristagoras, c. 513–499 BC (reintroduced democracy)
- Timarchus, 3rd century BC

== Mytilene ==
- Myrsilus, late 7th century BC, (Alcaeus was against him)
- Pittacus, fl. 600 BC (resigned after ten years)
- Coes, c. 507–499 BC (stoned)

== Naxos ==
- Lygdamis, until c. 512 BC
- Aristagoras, c. 502–499 BC

== Orchomenus ==
- Aristomelidas, Archaic period (?)
- Nearchus, 234 BC (resigned)

== Oreus ==
- Philistides, c. 341 BC (expelled)
- Menippus, 341 BC (expelled)

== Parium ==
- Herophantus, c. 513 BC

== Pellene ==
- Chaeron, after 336 BC

== Pharsalus ==
- Sisyphus, fl. 395 BC
- Polydamas, until 370 BC

== Pherae ==
- Lycophron
- Jason, before 370 BC (assassinated)
- Polydorus, 370 BC (assassinated)
- Polyphron, 370–369 BC (assassinated)
- Alexander, 369–358 BC (assassinated)
- Tisiphonus, 357–355/4 BC
- Lycophron II, 355–352 BC (resigned)
- Peitholaus, 355–352 and 349 BC (resigned, expelled)

== Phlius ==
- Leo, c. 540 BC
- Cleonymus, before 229 BC (resigned)

== Phocaea ==
- Laodamas, c. 513 BC

== Phocis ==
- Aulis, fl. c. 520 BC
- Phayllus, fl. 352 BC

== Pisa ==
- Damophon, before 7th century BC (?)
- Pantaleon, fl. 660–644 BC
- Damophon, fl. 588 BC
- Pyrrhus, 6th century BC

== Priene ==
- Hieron of Priene, 300–297 BC

== Proconnesus ==
- Metrodorus, c. 513 BC

== Rhegium ==
- Anaxilas, 494–476 BC
- Micythus, c. 476–467 BC (retired)
- Leophron, c. 467–461 BC (popular revolt)
- Dionysius the Younger, before 352 BC (expelled)
- Calippus, 352/351 BC (assassinated)
- Leptines II, after 351 BC

== Samos ==
- Demoteles, 7th century BC
- Syloson, c. 538 BC, again c. 521 BC
- Polycrates, c. 538-522 BC
- Maiandrius, c. 522 BC (reintroduced democracy)
- Charilaus, c. 522 BC
- Aeaces, c. 513 BC, reinstalled after 494 BC
- Theomestor, after 480 BC
- Kaios (father of Duris), after 322 BC
- Duris, c. 300–280 BC

== Selinus ==
- Theron, 6th/5th century BC
- Pythagoras, 6th/5th century BC
- Euryleon of Sparta, 6th/5th century BC (killed)

== Sicyon ==
- Orthagoras, from 676 BC
- Myron the Elder, fl. 648 BC, former Olympian winning in chariot race
- Aristonymus, father of Cleisthenes
- Isodemus
- Cleisthenes, 600–560 BC
- Aeschines, 560–556 BC removed by the Spartans
- Euphron, 368–366 BC (assassinated)
- Aristratus, fl. c. 340 BC
- Epichares (?), fl. c. 330 BC
- Cratesipolis, 314–308 BC (bribed)
- Cleon, c. 300–280 BC (assassinated)
- Euthydemus, c. 280–270 BC (expelled)
- Timocleidas, c. 280–270 BC (expelled)
- Abantidas, 264–252 BC (assassinated)
- Paseas, 252–251 BC (assassinated)
- Nicocles, 251 BC (expelled by Aratus of Sicyon)

== Sigeum ==
- Hegesistratus, fl. 510 BC

== Sinope ==
- Timesilaus, before 433 BC
- Scydrothemis, 301–280 BC

== Sparta ==
- Machanidas, 210–207 BC (killed in action)
- Nabis, 207–192 BC (assassinated by allies)
- Chaeron, 180 BC

== Sybaris ==
- Telys, c. 510 BC

== Syracuse ==
- Gelon, 491–478 BC
- Hieron I, 478–466 BC
- Thrasybulus, 466–465 BC (expelled, democracy restored)
- Dionysius the Elder, 405–367 BC
- Dionysius II, the Younger, 367–357 BC
- Apollocrates, 357 BC
- Heracleides, 357 BC
- Dion, 357–354 BC
- Calippus, 354–352 BC
- Hipparinus, 352–351 BC
- Dionysius II, the Younger, (restored, 346–344 BC)
- Timoleon, 345–337 BC
- Agathocles, 320 BC (banished)
- Acestorides, 320–319 BC
- Agathocles, 317–289 BC
- Hicetas, 289–279 BC
- Thoenon, 279 BC, See Siege of Syracuse (278 BC)
- Sosistratus, 279–277 BC
- Hieron II, 275–215 BC
- Gelon II, c. 240–216 BC
- Hieronymus, 215–214 BC
- Adranodoros, 214-212 BC
- Hippocrates, 213–212 BC
- Epicydes, 213–212 BC

== Tarentum ==
- Aristophilides, 6th/5th century BC

== Tarsus ==
- Lysias, before 67 BC

== Tauromenium ==
- Andromachus, fl. 344 BC
- Tyndarion, fl. 278 BC

== Thasos ==
- Symmachus, c. 520 BC

== Thebes ==
- Leontiades, 382–379 BC (killed)
- Archias, 382–379 BC (killed)
- Philippus, 382–379 BC (killed)
- Hypates, 382–379 BC (killed)

== Zeleia ==
- Nicagoras, 334 BC (conquered by Alexander the Great)
