= Aristagoras (given name) =

Aristagoras usually refers to the tyrant of Miletus (d. 496 BC) who began the Ionian Revolt.

Aristagoras (Αρισταγόρας) was also a Greek masculine given name which may refer to:

- Aristagoras, 6th century BC, father of Hegesistratus, the emissary from Samos to the Lacedaemonian army at Delos in one incident of the Persian Wars
- Aristagoras of Cyme (6th century BC), tyrant of Cyme, son of Heracleides
- Aristagoras, 5th century BC, tyrant of Cyzicus on the Propontis
- Aristagoras (poet), 5th century BC, a comic writer at Miletus
- Aristagoras of Tenedos, c. 446 BC, a person of athletic note mentioned in an ode of Pindar
- Aristagoras, 4th century BC, son of Eudoxus of Cnidus
- Aristagoras (writer), Greek historian on Egypt
- Aristagoras, c. 268 BC, member of the Amphictyonic League at Delphi for that year for the Ionians

Its feminine form Aristagora may refer to:

- Aristagora, 6th century BC, mistress of the orator Hyperides
