= Apis (deity) =

Ancient Egyptian deity and sacred bull

Name in hieroglyphs
V28 Aa5 Q3 E1 G43 (Note: Variant representations of Apis include V28 Aa5 Q3 E1,Aa5 Q3 E1, Aa5 Q3 G43,Aa5 Q3, and G39.)
- Major cult center: Memphis
- Symbol: Bull
- Parents: Hathor

In ancient Egyptian religion, Apis or Hapis, (Note: Ancient Egyptian: ḥjpw, reconstructed as Old Egyptian */ˈħujpVw/ with unknown final vowel; Medio-Late Egyptian ˈħeʔp(Vw); Coptic: ϩⲁⲡⲉ ḥapə) alternatively spelled Hapi-ankh, was a sacred bull or multiple sacred bulls worshipped in the Memphis region. He was commonly identified as the son of Hathor, a major goddess in the ancient Egyptian pantheon. Initially, he was assigned a significant role in her worship, but later he also served as an intermediary between humans and other deities such as Ptah and Osiris.

Auguste Mariette's excavation of the Serapeum of Saqqara revealed the tombs of more than sixty bulls scarified to the Apis cult. The bulls were buried over a period of 1400 years, from the New Kingdom period until the end of the Ptolemaic dynasty.

== History of worship ==
Worship of an Apis bull, experienced by ancient Egyptians as holy, has been known since the First Dynasty in Memphis, while worship of the Apis as a proper god, at least according to Manetho's Aegyptiaca, seems to be a later adoption, purportedly started during the reign of king Kaiechos (possibly Nebra) of the Second Dynasty.

Apis is named on very early monuments, but little is known of the divine animal before the New Kingdom. Ceremonial burials of bulls indicate that ritual sacrifice was part of the worship of the early cow deities, Hathor and Bat, and a bull might represent her offspring, a king who became a deity after death. He was entitled "the renewal of the life" of the Memphite deity Ptah: but after death, he became Osorapis, i.e. the Osiris Apis, just as dead humans were assimilated to Osiris, the ruler of the underworld. This Osorapis was identified with Serapis of the late Hellenistic period and may well be identical with him. Creating parallels to their own religious beliefs, ancient Greek writers identified Apis as an incarnation of Osiris, ignoring the connection with Ptah.

Apis was the most popular of three great bull cults of ancient Egypt, the others being the cults of Mnevis and Buchis. All are related to the worship of Hathor or Bat, similar primary goddesses separated by region until unification that eventually merged as Hathor. The worship of Apis was continued by the Greeks and after them by the Romans, and lasted until almost 400 CE.

== Herald of Ptah ==
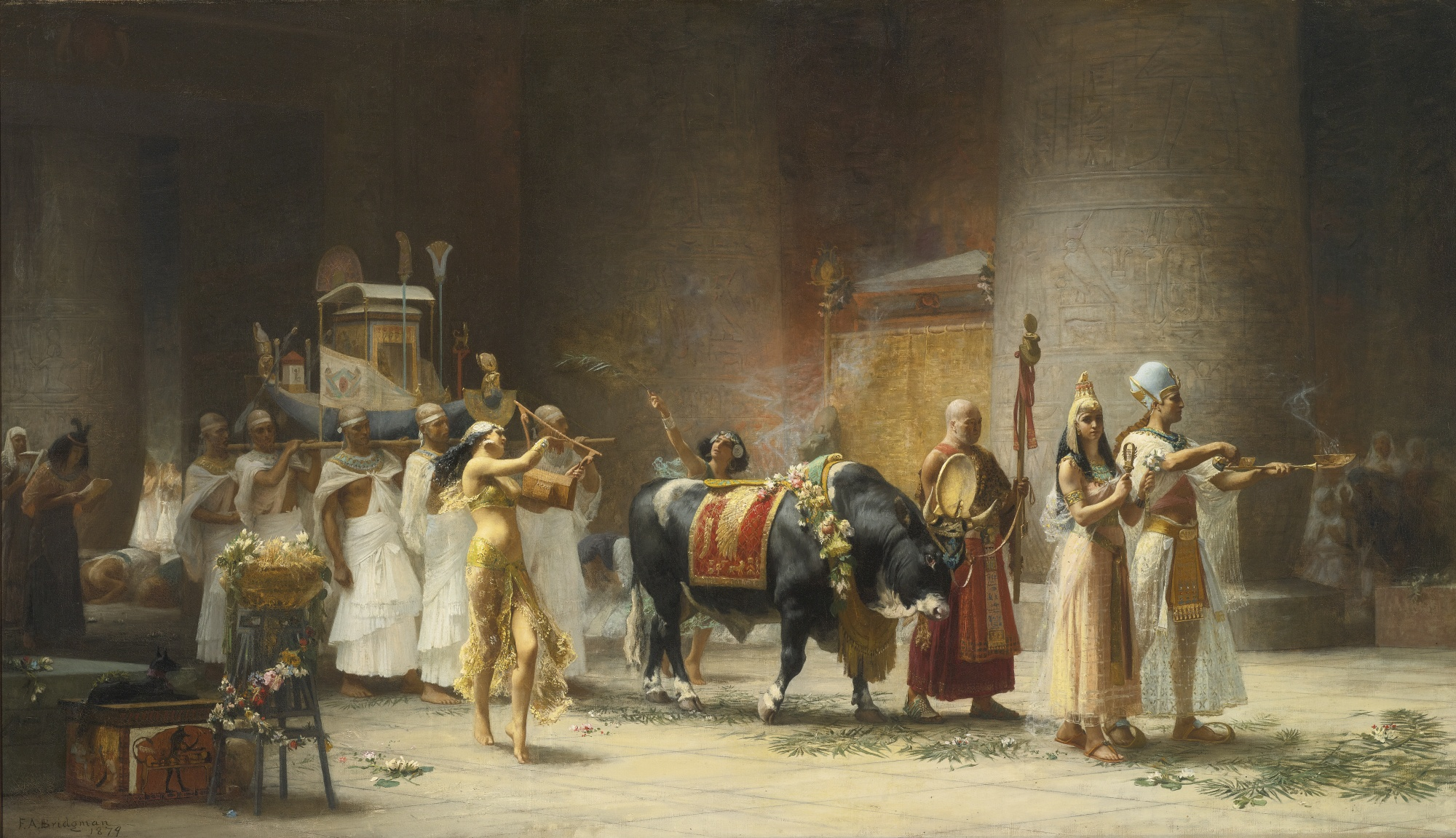
The sacred procession of Apis Osiris by F.A. Bridgman

This animal was chosen because it symbolized the courageous heart, great strength, and fighting spirit of the king. Apis came to be considered a manifestation of the king, as bulls were symbols of strength and fertility, qualities that are closely linked with kingship. "Strong bull of his mother Hathor" was a common title for Egyptian gods and male kings, being unused for women serving as king, such as Hatshepsut.

As early as the time of the Narmer Palette, the king is depicted with a bovine tail on one side, and a bull is seen knocking down the walls of a city on the other.

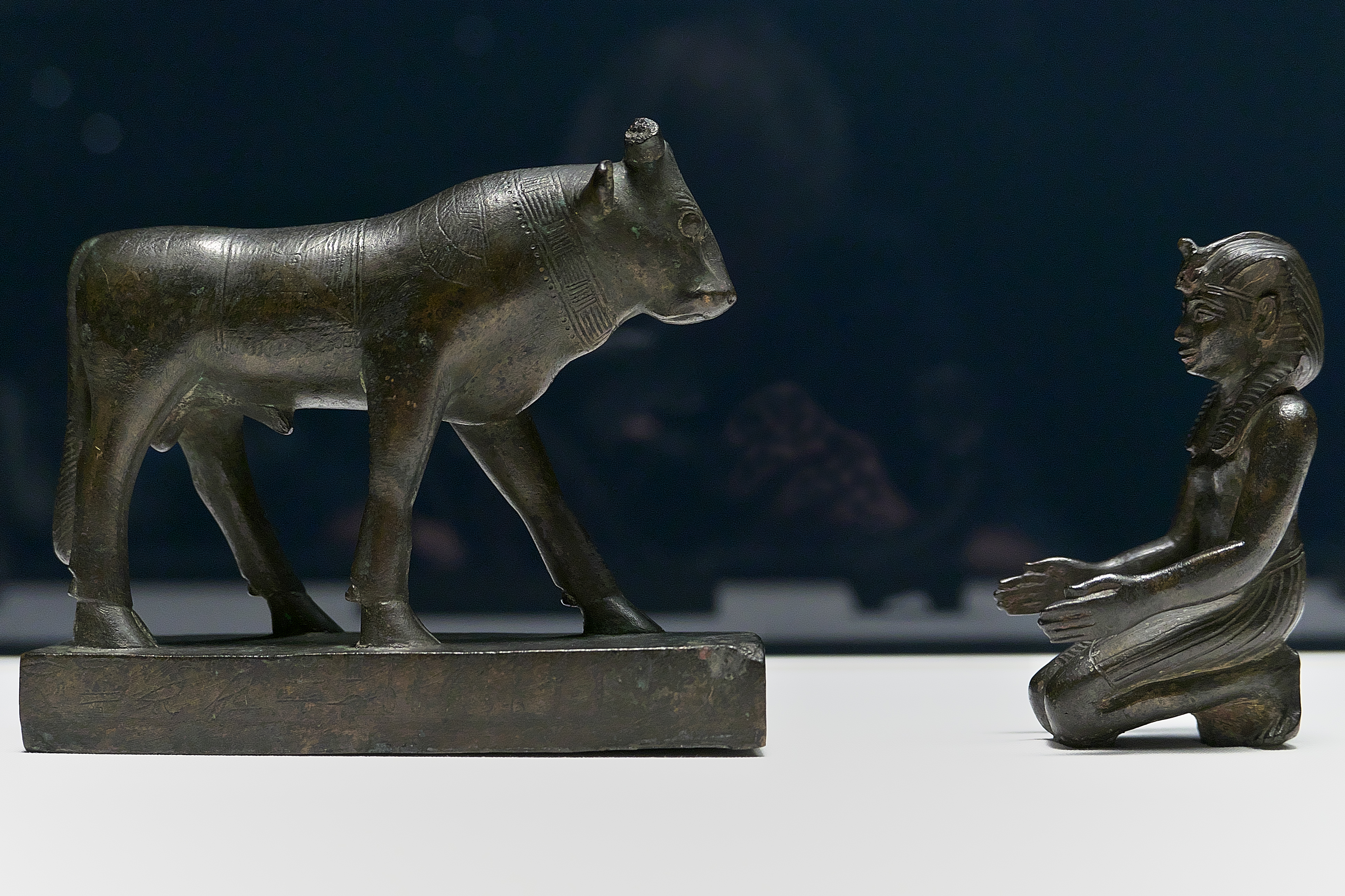
Pharaoh statuette with the Apis bull (British Museum)

Occasionally, Apis was pictured with the sun-disk symbol of his mother, Hathor, between his horns, being one of few deities ever associated with her symbol. When the disk was depicted on his head with his horns below and the triangular marking on his forehead, an ankh was suggested. That symbol always was closely associated with Hathor.

Early on, Apis was the herald (wḥm) of Ptah, the chief deity in the area around Memphis. As a manifestation of Ptah, Apis also was considered to be a symbol of the king, embodying the qualities of kingship. In the region where Ptah was worshiped, cattle exhibited white patterning on their mainly black bodies, and so a belief grew up that the Apis calf had to have a certain set of markings suitable to its role. It was required to have a white triangular marking upon its forehead, a white Egyptian vulture wing outline on its back, a scarab mark under its tongue, a white crescent moon shape on its right flank, and double hairs on his tail.

The calf that matched these markings was selected from the herds, brought to a temple, given a harem of cows, and worshiped as an aspect of Ptah. The cow who was his mother was believed to have conceived him by a flash of lightning from the heavens, or from moonbeams. She also was treated specially, and given a special burial. At the temple, Apis was used as an oracle, his movements being interpreted as prophecies. His breath was believed to cure disease and his presence to bless those around with strength. A window was created in the temple through which he could be viewed and, on certain holidays, he was led through the streets of the city, bedecked with jewelry and flowers.

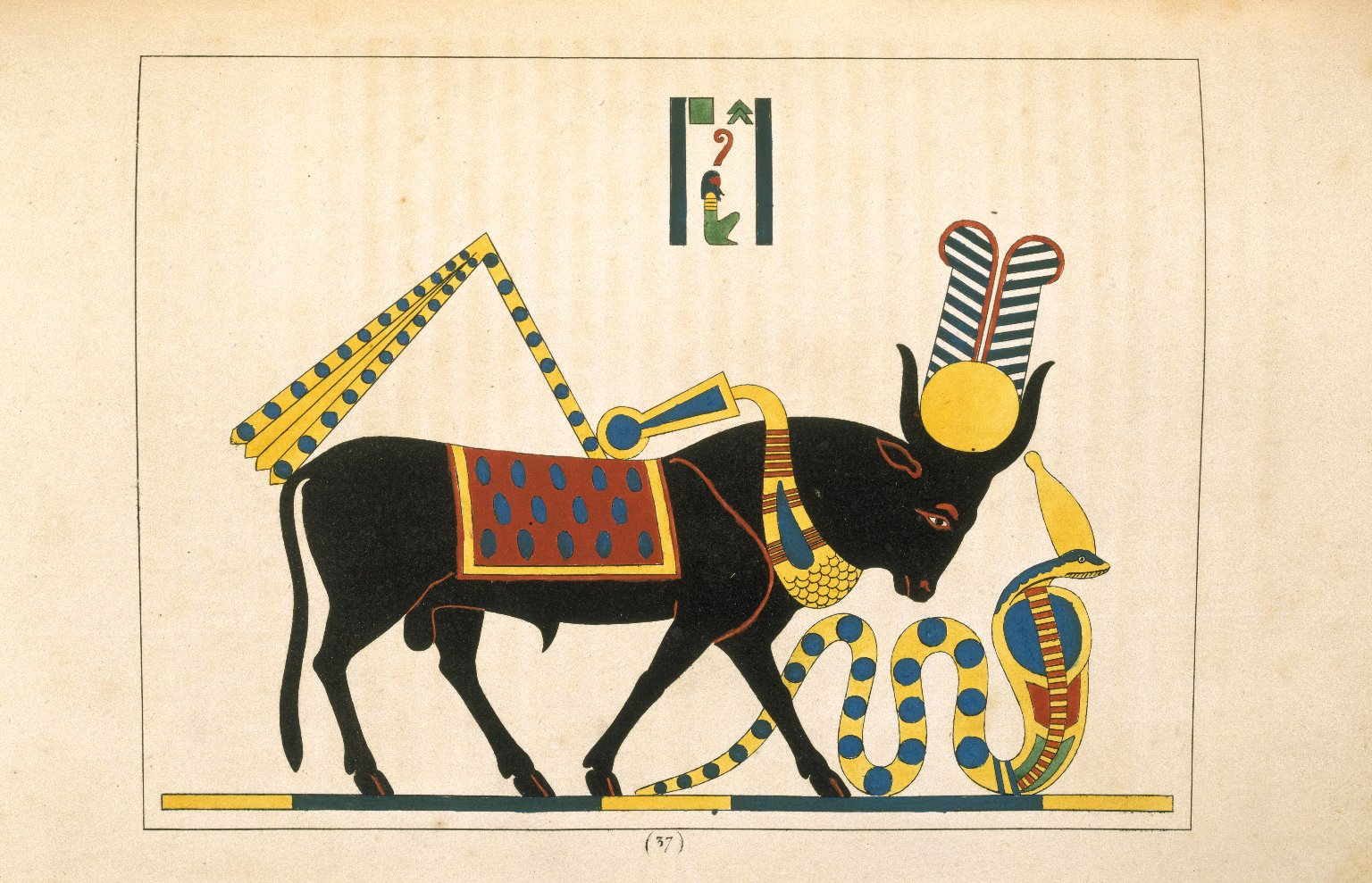
Api or Hapi (Apis, Taureau Consacré a la Lune), N372.2, Brooklyn Museum

== Burial ==
Details of the mummification ritual of the sacred bull are written within the Apis papyrus. Sometimes the body of the bull was mummified and fixed in a standing position on a foundation made of wooden planks.

By the New Kingdom period, the remains of the sacred bulls were interred at the cemetery of Saqqara. The earliest known burial in Saqqara was performed in the reign of Amenhotep III by his son Thutmose; afterward, seven more bulls were buried nearby. Ramesses II initiated Apis burials in what now is known as the Serapeum, an underground complex of burial chambers at Saqqara for the sacred bulls, a site used throughout the rest of Ancient Egyptian history into the reign of Cleopatra.

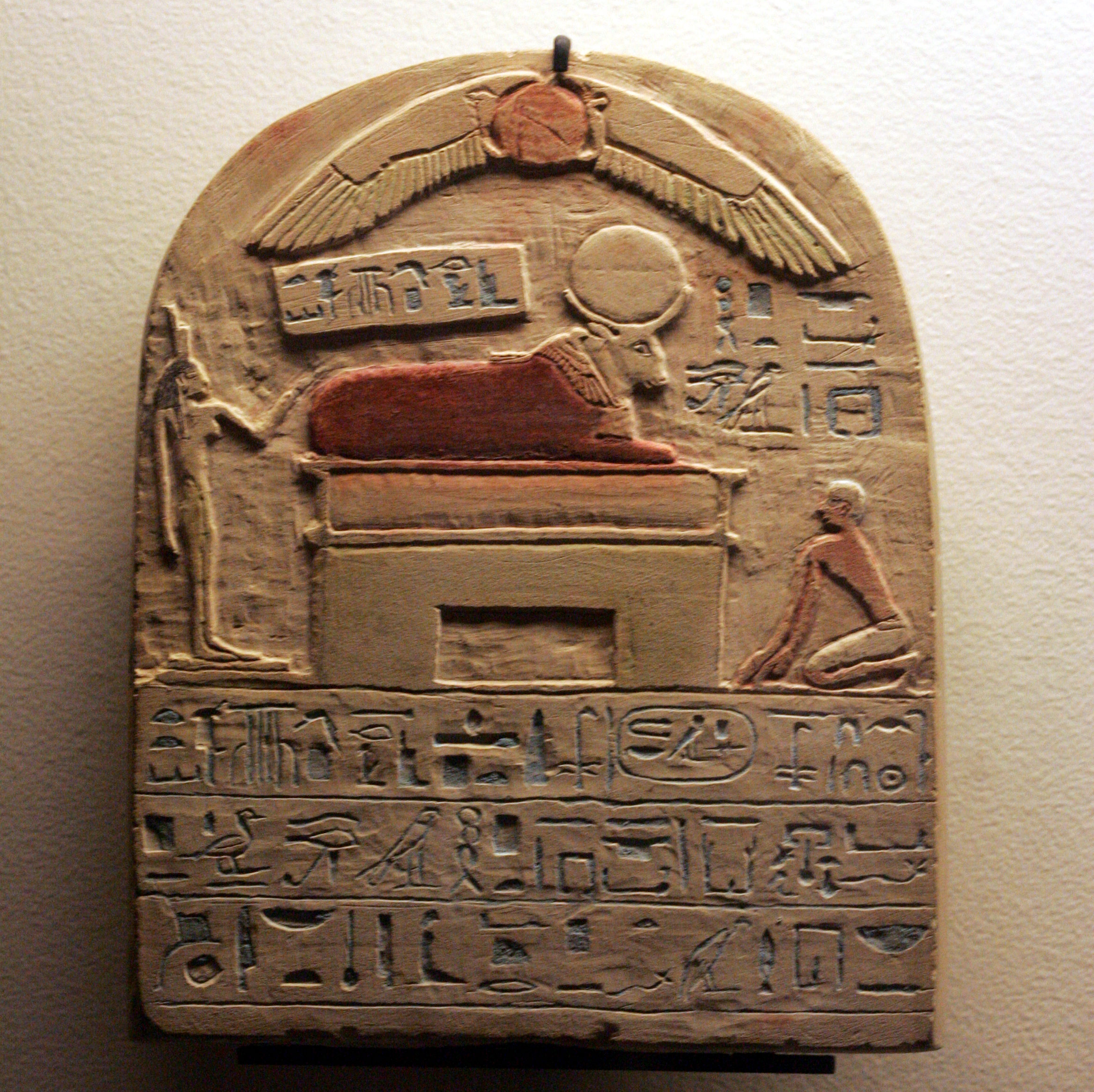
Stele dedicated to an Apis, dating to Year 21 of Psamtik I (c. 644 BCE)

Khaemweset, the priestly son of Ramesses II (c. 1300 BCE), excavated a great gallery to be lined with the tomb chambers; another similar gallery was added by Psamtik I. The careful documentation of the ages of the animals in the later instances, with the regnal dates for their birth, enthronement, and death have thrown much light on the chronology from the Twenty-second Dynasty onward. The name of the mother cow and the place of the calf's birth are often recorded. The sarcophagi are of immense size and the burial must have entailed enormous expense. It is remarkable, therefore, that the ancient religious leaders contrived to bury one of the animals in the fourth year of Cambyses II.

The Apis was a protector of the deceased and linked to the pharaoh. Horns embellish some of the tombs of ancient pharaohs and Apis often was depicted on private coffins as a powerful protector. As a form of Osiris, ruler of the underworld, it was believed that to be under the protection of Apis would give the person control over the four winds in the afterlife.

== From animal to human ==
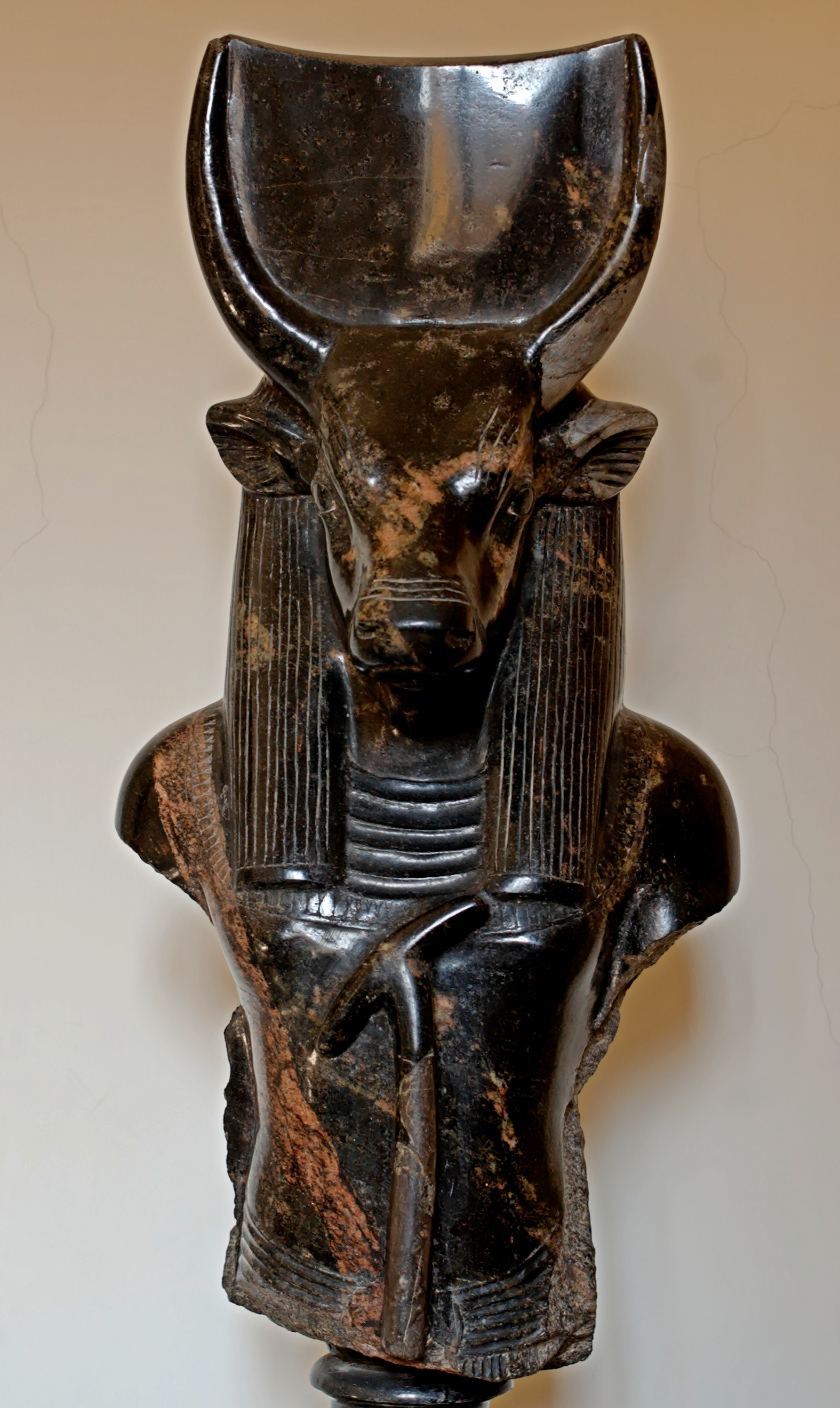
Anthropomorphical representation of Apis, Ptolemaic Period (3rd–2nd centuries BC).

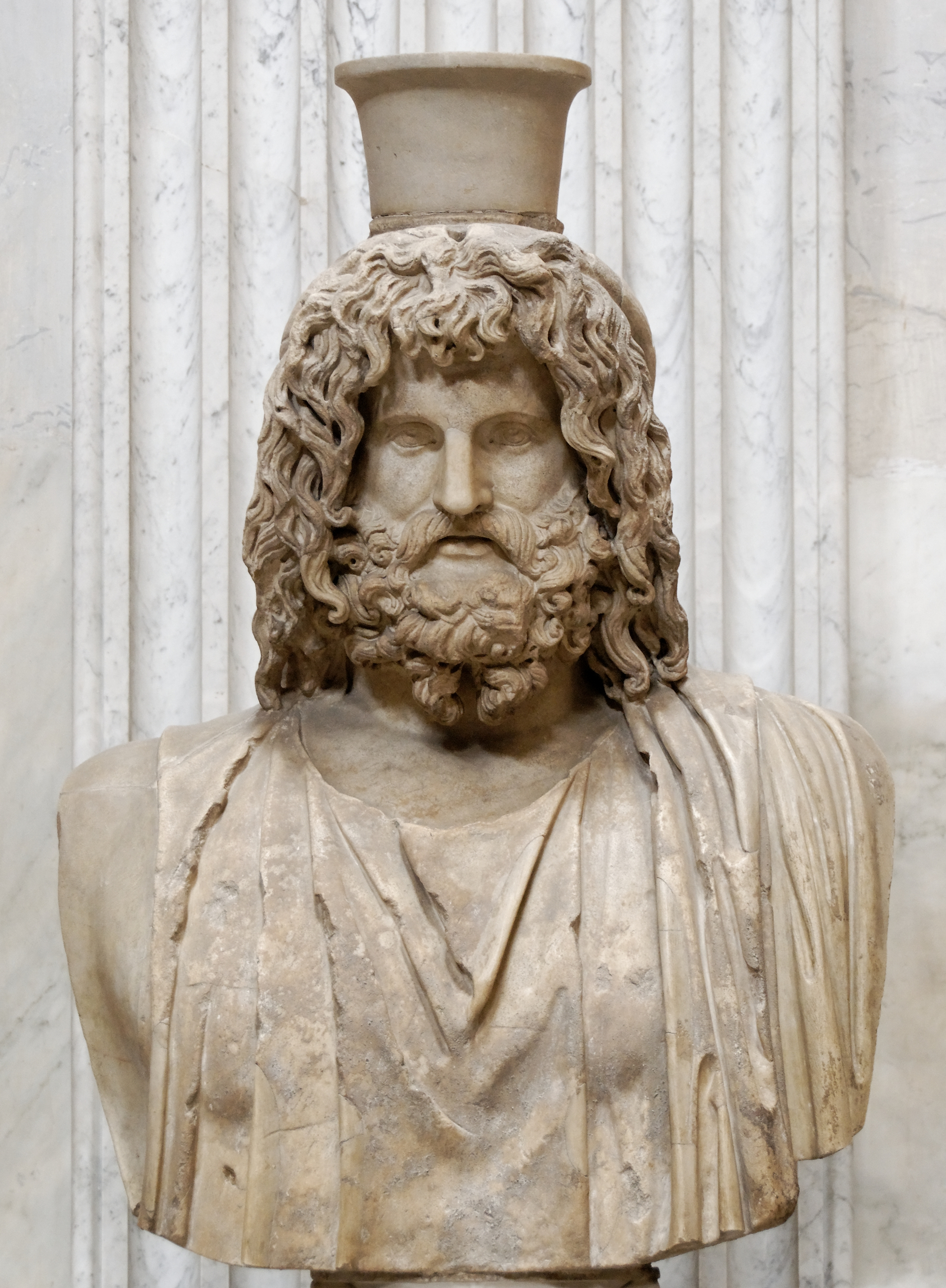
Bust of the Hellenistic-Egyptian deity Serapis, Roman copy of an original by Bryaxis that stood at the Serapeion of Alexandria, Vatican Museums

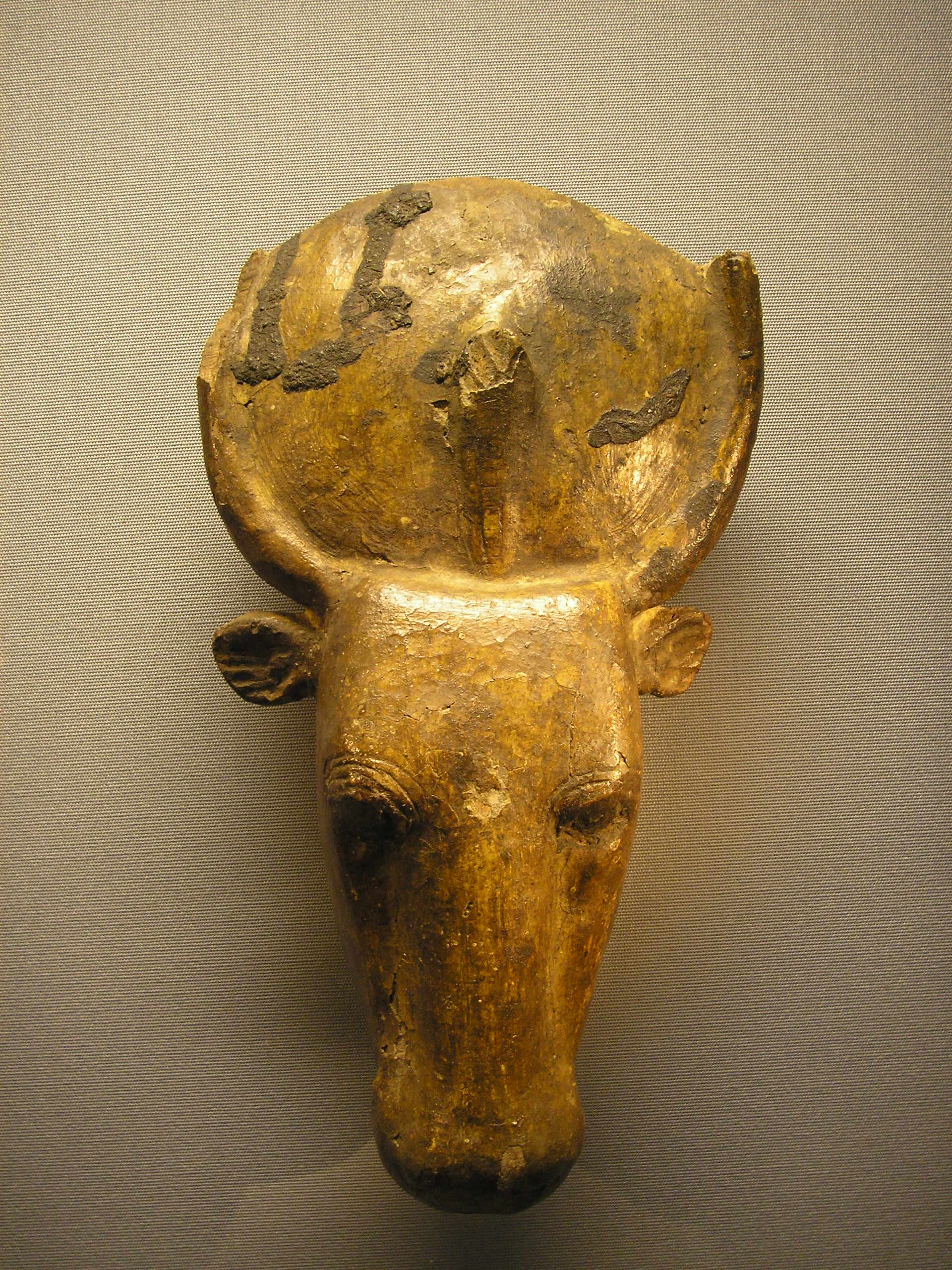
Gilded sculpture of an Apis head with the sacred disk of Hathor, Kunsthistorisches Museum

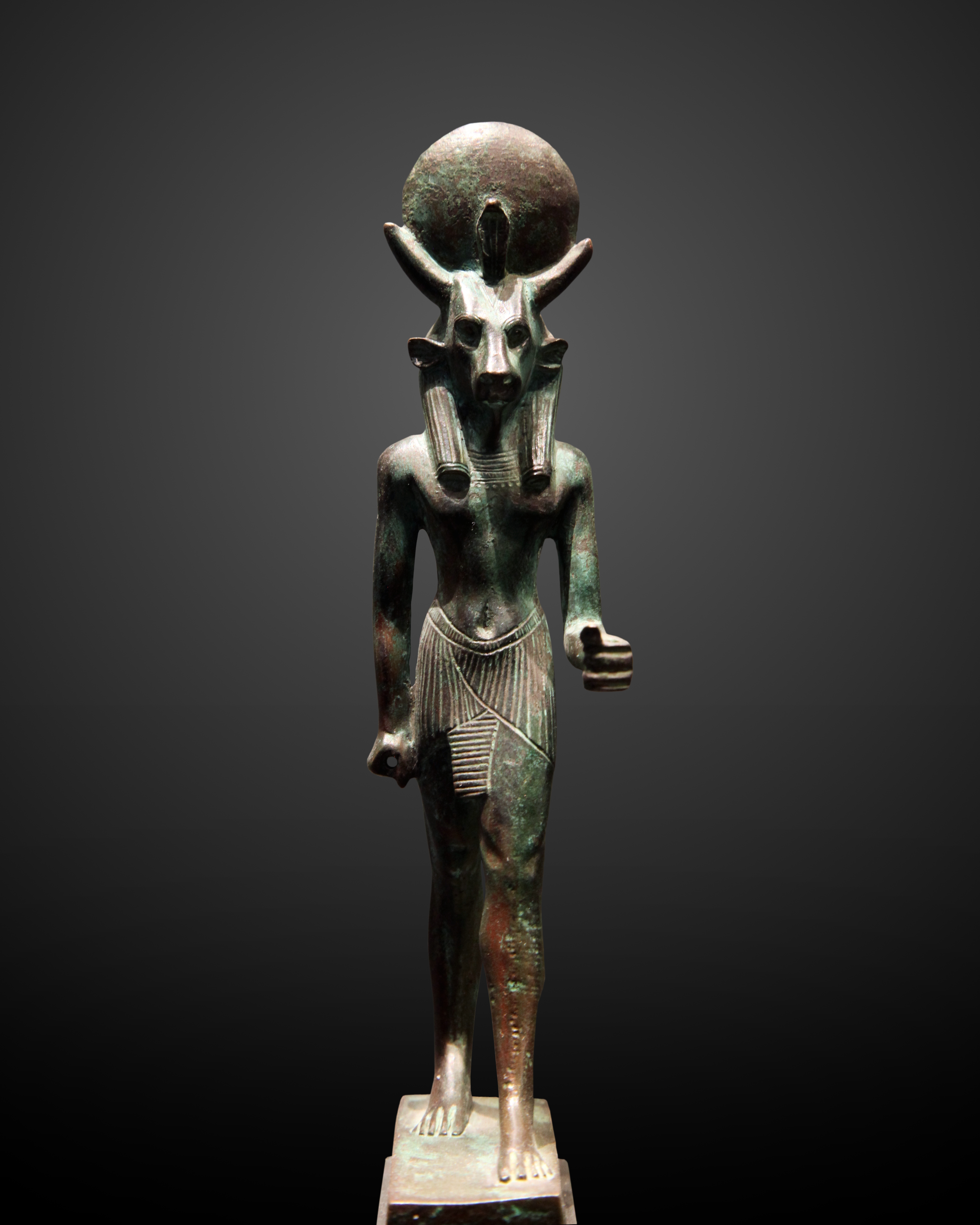
Bronze statuette of the god Apis - Louvre Museum.

According to Arrian, Apis was one of the Egyptian deities Alexander the Great propitiated by offering a sacrifice during his seizure of Ancient Egypt from the Persians. After Alexander's death, his general Ptolemy I Soter made efforts to integrate Egyptian religion with that of the new Hellenic rulers. Ptolemy's policy was to find a deity that might win the reverence of both groups, despite the curses of the Egyptian religious leaders against the deities of the previous foreign rulers (i.e. Set, lauded by the Hyksos). Without success, Alexander had attempted to use Amun for this purpose, but that deity was more prominent in Upper Egypt and not for those in Lower Egypt, where the Greeks had stronger influence. Since the Greeks had little respect for animal-headed deities, a Greek statue was created as an idol and proclaimed as an anthropomorphic equivalent of the highly popular Apis. It was named Aser-hapi (i.e. Osiris-Apis), which became Serapis, and later was said to represent Osiris fully, rather than just his Ka.

The earliest mention of a Serapis is in the authentic death scene of Alexander, from the royal diaries. Here, Serapis has a temple at Babylon, and is of such importance that he alone is named as being consulted on behalf of the dying Alexander. The presence of this temple in Babylon radically altered perceptions of the mythologies of this era, although it has been discovered that the unconnected Babylonian deity Ea was entitled Serapsi, meaning king of the deep, and it is Serapsi who is referred to in the diaries, not Serapis. The significance of this Serapsi in the Hellenic psyche, however, due to its involvement in Alexander's death, also may have contributed to the choice of Osiris-Apis as the chief Ptolemaic deity during their occupation of Ancient Egypt.

According to Plutarch, Ptolemy stole the statue from Sinope, having been instructed in a dream by the Unknown God to bring the statue to Alexandria, where the statue was pronounced to be "Serapis" by two religious experts. Among those experts was one of the Eumolpidae, the ancient family from which the hierophant of the Eleusinian Mysteries traditionally had been chosen since before any historical records. The other expert supposedly was the scholarly Egyptian priest Manetho, which increased acceptability from both the Egyptians and the Greeks.

Plutarch may not be correct, however, as some Egyptologists assert that the Sinope in Plutarch's report is the hill of Sinopeion, a name given to the site of an existing Serapeum at Memphis. Also, according to Tacitus, Serapis (i.e. Apis explicitly identified as Osiris in full) had been the tutelary deity of the village of Rhacotis, before it suddenly expanded into the great capital of "Alexandria".

Being introduced by the Greeks, understandably, the statue depicted a fully human figure resembling Hades or Pluto, both being kings of the Greek underworld. The figure was enthroned with the modius, which is a basket or a grain-measure, on his head, a Greek symbol for the land of the dead. He also held a sceptre, indicating rulership, and Cerberus, gatekeeper of the underworld, rested at his feet. It also had what appeared to be a serpent at its base, fitting the Egyptian symbol of sovereignty, the uraeus.

With his (i.e., Osiris') wife, Isis, and their son (at this point in history) Horus (in the form of Harpocrates), Serapis won an important place in the Greek world, reaching Ancient Rome, with Anubis being identified as Cerberus.

== See also ==
- List of Apis bulls
- Ankh
- Auðumbla
- Golden calf
- Hathor
- Hesat
- Mehet-Weret
- Nandi (bull)
