= Labda =

Labda may refer to:

- Lambda, a letter of the Greek alphabet
- Labda (mythology), a figure in Greek mythology

== See also ==
- Lambda (disambiguation)
- Lapda, an ancient town in Roman Africa
