= Phintias =

Phintias may refer to:

- Phintias (painter), the red-figure painter
- The city of Licata, known as "Phintias" in ancient times
- Phintias of Agrigentum, tyrant of Agrigentum and founder of the above
- The philosopher Pythias, also known as "Phintias"
