= Mnesarchus =

Mnesarchus or Mnesarch may refer to:

- Father of Pythagoras
- Alleged son of Pythagoras
- Mnesarchus of Athens, a Stoic philosopher, lived c. 100 BC
- A possible name of the father of Euripides
- Father of Callias of Chalcis
- An assistant archon of Athens (thesmothete)
