= Meidias =

4th-century BC influential Athenian citizen

Meidias (Greek: Mειδίας; lived during the 4th century BC), an Athenian of considerable wealth and influence, was a violent and bitter enemy of Demosthenes, the orator. He displayed his first act of hostility in 361 BC when he broke violently into the house of Demosthenes with his brother Thrasylochus in order to take possession of it. Thrasylochus offered, in the case of a trierarchy, to make an exchange of property with Demosthenes, under a private understanding with the guardians of the latter that, if the exchange were effected, the suit then pending against them should be dropped.

This led Demosthenes to bring against him an accusation of kakegoria (i.e. verbal insult), and when Meidias after his condemnation did not fulfil his obligations, Demosthenes brought against him a dike exules (i.e. a trial for obtaining something already lawfully assigned to the plaintiff). Meidias found means to prevent any decision being given for a period of eight years, and at length, in 354 BC, he had an opportunity to take revenge upon Demosthenes, who had in that year voluntarily undertaken the choregia.

Meidias endeavoured in all possible ways to prevent Demosthenes from discharging his office in its proper form. Their mutual relations soured even more when Demosthenes attempted to oppose the proposal for sending aid against Callias and Taurosthenes of Chalcis to Plutarch, the tyrant of Eretria, and the friend of Meidias. The breaking point arrived when Meidias violently attacked Demosthenes during the celebration of the great Dionysia. Such an act gave Demosthenes a good opportunity for moving a public incrimination against his enemy (353 BC), and on this occasion wrote Against Meidias, still extant, which was never pronounced as the two adversaries found an amicable arrangement under which Demosthenes retired his accusation for thirty minae.
