= Hicetas (disambiguation) =

Hicetas was a Pythagorean philosopher from Syracusae Sicily.

Hicetas also may refer to:

- Hicetas (tyrant of Syracuse), Tyrant of Syracuse, 289 BC-278 BC
- Hicetas of Leontini, a military leader of Syracuse and tyrant of Leontini, fl. c. 353 BC - 344 BC
- Hicetas (Orchomenus), a king of Orchomenus in Arcadia, Greece. He was son of the elder Aristocrates of Orchomenus and father of the younger Aristocrates of Orchomenus.
