= Clitarchus =

Clitarchus may refer to:

- Cleitarchus, a Greek historian active in the late 4th century BCE
- Cleitarchus of Eretria, a Greek tyrant who lived in the 4th century BCE
- Clitarchus (phasmid), a genus of insects in the family Phasmatidae
