= Callias (disambiguation) =

Callias was the head of a wealthy Athenian family.

Callias may also refer to:

- Callias (poet) (5th century BC), poet of the Old Comedy
- Callias (son of Calliades) (c. 470–432 BC), son of Calliades, who died in the battle of Potidaea
- Callias III (4th century BC), Athenian dilettante
- Callias of Chalcis (4th century BC), Greek ruler
