= Leophron =

Greek tyrant of Rhegium and Messana from 467 to 461 BC

Leophron was the son of Anaxilas, tyrant of Rhegium and Messana in Magna Graecia. According to Dionysius of Halicarnassus, he succeeded his father in the sovereign power. It is therefore probable that he was the eldest of the two sons of Anaxilas, in whose name Micythus assumed the sovereignty, and who afterwards, at the instigation of Hieron of Syracuse, dispossessed the latter of his authority. Diodorus, from whom we learn these facts, does not mention the name of either of the young princes. According to the same author, their reign lasted six years (467–461 BC), when they were expelled by a popular insurrection both from Rhegium and Zancle. Leophron is elsewhere mentioned as carrying on war against the neighbouring city of Locri, and as displaying his magnificence at the Olympic games, by feasting the whole assembled multitude. His victory on that occasion was celebrated by Simonides.
