= List of Apis bulls =

This is a list of the Apis bulls of Ancient Egypt, worshipped at Memphis and buried in the Serapeum of Saqqara. All the bulls were called Apis, but they were differentiated by naming the cow that bore them.

Mother	Date of birth	Date of death	Birthplace	Notes
Tawere	321 BC	July 299 BC	-	Burial funded by Ptolemy I.
Wadjetiti	299 BC	17 December 281 BC	Ta-ouba-ta-may, Heliopolis	
Unknown	281 BC	255 BC	Unknown	Example
Trenenutet I	255 BC	231 BC	Sais	
Gerege I	231 BC	210 BC	Hout-, Memphis	Alternatively dated 232–210 BC
Ta-amun II Mutiiti	210 BC	7 December 187 BC	Perkha, Thebaid	
Trenenutet II	19 January 186 BC	7 April 164 BC	Damanhur, Sais	Enthroned 29 October 185 BC. Especially patronised by Ptolemy VI who was born in the same year as this bull and was referred to as "twin of the living Apis upon their birth-brick."
Tahor	164 BC	21 July 143 BC	Pagereghor, Athribis	Ptolemy VIII's titulature closely associated him with this bull.
Gerege II	18 February 142 BC	8 September 119 BC	Temple of Ptah, Memphis	Closely associated with Ptolemy IX, who was born in the same year as this bull and was referred to as "distinguished in his birth together with that of the living Apis."
Gerege III	119 BC	11 June 96 BC	Pahetep, Heliopolis	Not buried until 86 BC.
Taamun III Ta-igesh	96 BC	27 October 75 BC	Oxyrhynchus	
Tabastet	75 BC	after 50 BC	Pagereghor, Cynopolis	
Tapihy or Taihy	after 50 BC	-	Unknown	Perhaps the Apis bull at the time of the Roman conquest

== Bibliography ==
- Thompson, Dorothy J. (2012). Memphis under the Ptolemies (2. ed.). Princeton: Princeton Univ. Press. ISBN 9780691140339.
