= Mnason of Phocis =

Greek general, slaveowner, and student of Aristotle

Mnason of Phocis (Greek: Μνάσων) was the son of Mnaseas, who took command of the Phokian army after the death of Phayllus. Mnason was a student of Aristotle. Mnason was infamous for the large number of slaves he kept.

There is an apocryphal story of Aristotle aggressively questioning Plato in his old age, in which Mnason is mentioned as being in attendance.
