= Apis Papyrus =

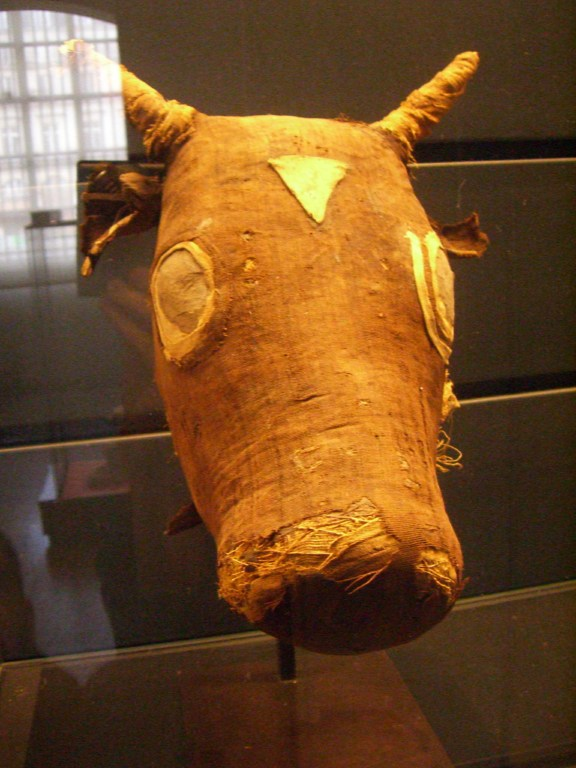

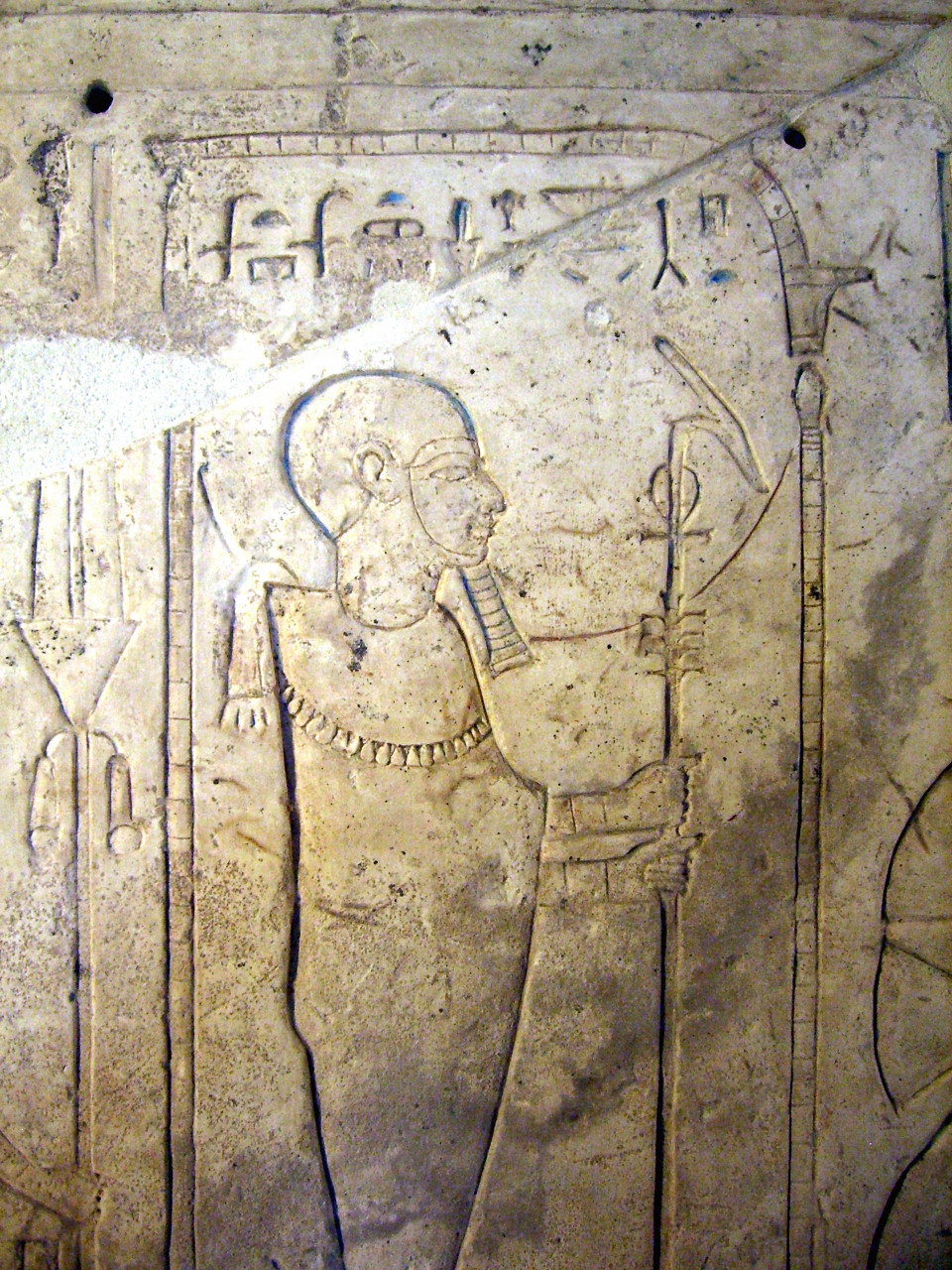
The Apis was the earthly form of the god Ptah while alive...

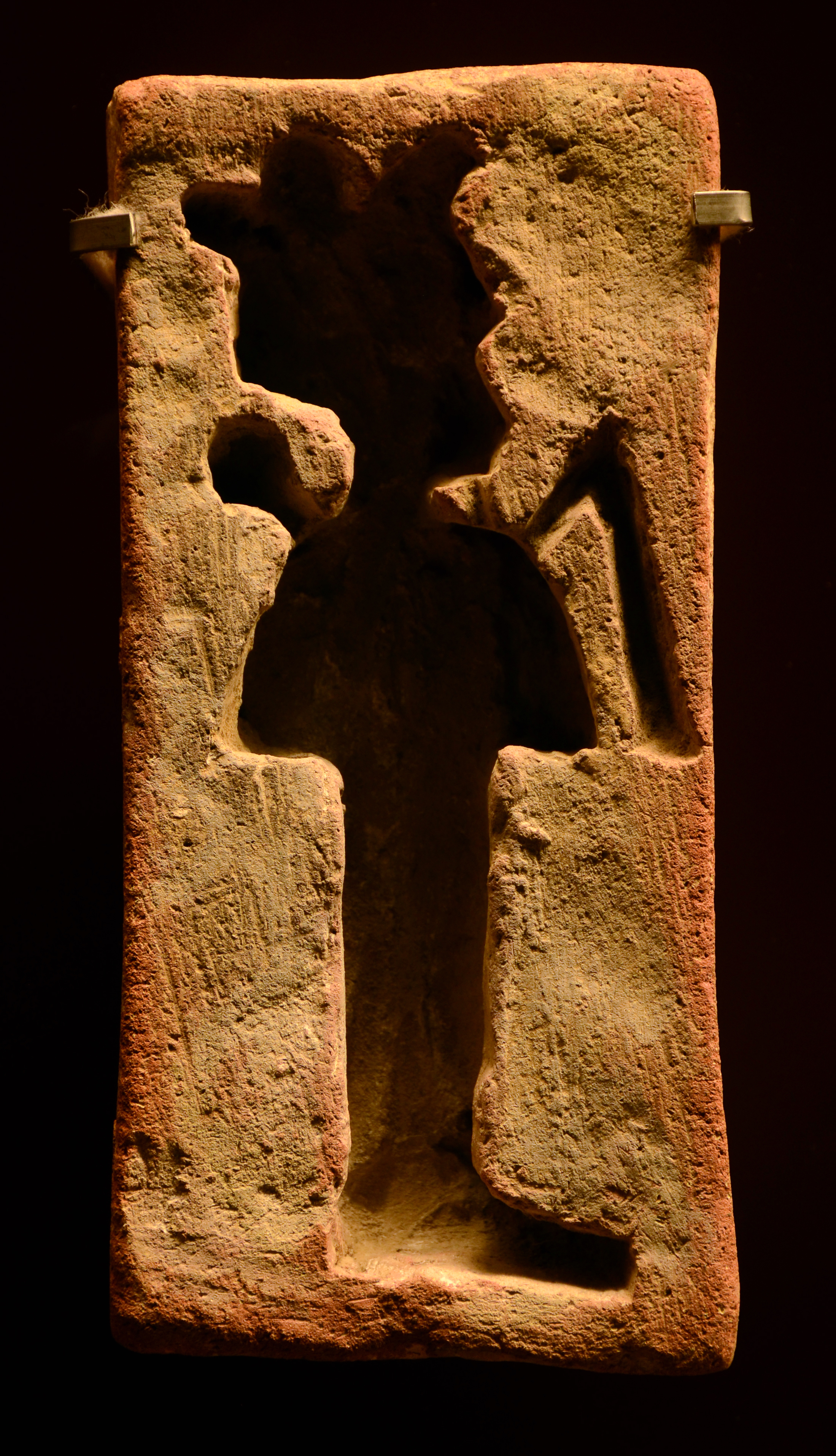
... and the god Osiris after death

The Apis Papyrus is an ancient Egyptian artifact, the work of scribes upon papyrus, concerning the Apis bull.

== Language ==
The text on the papyrus is written in hieratic-demotic script, and the inscriptions are the work of two scribes.

== Dating ==
According to one source the papyrus was written during the middle of the 2nd century BC, another source dates the papyrus to a period falling within the 26th Dynasty, and a third considers the papyrus dates to the 1st century C.E.

== Contents ==
The text shows details of the burial rites and ritual of performing an embalming of the Apis, particularly the last parts or stages of the embalming.

D.K. Sharpes states the ritual extended to seventy days. Priests performing the ritual were required to maintain hair at a long length, not bathe, to wear costumes made especially for the purposes of the fulfilment of the ritual, wail loudly, fast for four days and abstain from milk and meat for the remaining sixty-six days.

== History of scholarship ==
The papyrus was purchased in 1821 by Dr Ernst August Burghart for the Münz und Antikencabinet at a cost of 200 Guilders Konventionsmünze.

Heinrich Brugsch was the first scholar to study the papyrus. In 1886, von Bergmann published a photolithograph of it, and in 1920 Wilhelm Spiegelberg published the first translation. The papyrus was contained within the Kunsthistoriches Museum at a time circa 1993.

== See also ==
- List of ancient Egyptian papyri
