= Rhacotis =

Ancient city in Egypt

Rhacotis Ῥακῶτις
- City
- Interactive map of Rhacotis
- Country: Egypt

r Z1 a A35 t niwt
r-ꜥ-qd(y)t (Alexandria)
in hieroglyphs
Era: Ptolemaic dynasty
(305–30 BC)

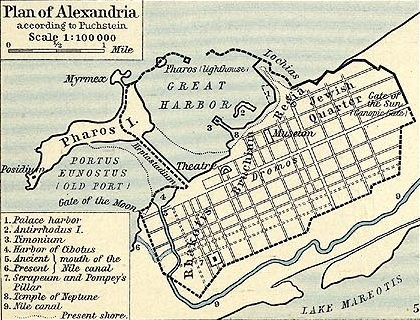

Rhacotis (Egyptian: r-ꜥ-qd(y)t, Coptic: ⲣⲁⲕⲟϯ, Greek Ῥακῶτις; also romanized as Rhakotis) was the name for a city on the northern coast of Egypt at the site of Alexandria. Rhacotis may have been the name for an earlier settlement on the site of Alexandria or, alternatively, a term meaning "construction site" referring to the establishment of the new city.

Rhacotis was located west of the now-silted Canopic branch of the Nile. Unlike ports within the Nile Delta, it was reliably accessible to large ships, and enough water for a city could be supplied by a canal. It is also described as the home of sentinels who protected the Egyptian kingdom from outsiders.

== Etymology ==
The root of the name, qd, means "construct". The prefix r-ꜥ can be used as a derivational morpheme forming nouns of action from infinitives, so a likely interpretation of the name as a whole is "building site" or "construction in progress". Michel Chaveau of the École pratique des hautes études argues that Rhakotis may simply have been the Egyptian name of the construction site for Alexandria; while John Baines contends that the style of the name and its linguistic context indicate that the name is older.

== Classical descriptions ==
The original city may have included the island of Pharos, a harbor mentioned in Homer's Odyssey as the kingdom of Proteus. Plutarch writes that this reference influenced Alexander in his decision to found a new capital at the harbor of Pharos.

The earliest text from Alexandria, a hieroglyphic "satrap" stela from the month of Thout in 311 BC, refers to R-qd as the preceding name of the city.

Strabo, in his description of Alexandria, describes Rhacotis as the home of Egyptian sentinels guarding the Nile. Pliny the Elder mentions Rhacotes as the former name of the site of Alexandria.

Alexandria was planned by Dinocrates, an experienced Greek architect and city planner from Rhodes, who modeled the new city after the Hellenistic architectural style popular in the Greek world at the time. The existing small village of Rhacotis, then a fishing port, became the Egyptian quarter of the city, located on the West side. Egyptians may have continued to refer to the whole city as Rhakotis, and in some cases resented its existence.

Tacitus relates a story of the Egyptian priests that Ptolemy I Soter, seeking a blessing for the construction of Alexandria, received instructions to obtain a certain statue from the temple of "infernal Jupiter" (Pluto) in Pontus (on the northern coast of modern Turkey, along the Black Sea). First, they visit the oracle Pythia at Delphi, who confirms they are to remove the statue, but not its female companion (Proserpina). When they reach King Scydrothemis at Sinope, they find him reluctant to part with the statue. The god then leaves the temple of his own will and conveys the party back to Alexandria, where a new temple is established at Rhacotis—the historical site of a temple to Serapis and Isis.

== Archaeology ==
Continuing maritime archaeology in the harbour of Alexandria has revealed details of Rhakotis before the arrival of Alexander. In 1916, while preparing the construction of a new port, French engineer Gaston Jondet found a sophisticated ancient port facility west of Pharos. Kamal Abu el-Saadat continued research in the 1960s with a pioneering submarine archaeology campaign, which found more ruins and a 25-ton statue fragment. Another campaign began in the 1990s under the supervision of Franck Goddio, finding numerous artifacts, including twelve sphinxes, some apparently removed from Heliopolis by the Ptolemies.

Wood pilings and planks, dated chemically and stratigraphically to c. 400 BC, and potsherds dated to 1000 BC, have been recovered from Alexandria's eastern harbor.

Recent chemical analysis of artifacts found in the harbor has discovered high levels of lead in the third millennium BC, peaking circa the turn of the 23rd century BC (Old Kingdom), and again near the turn of the first millennium BC (Nineteenth and Twentieth dynasties), as well as in the Hellenic era following the conquest of Alexander. They also suggest an expansive trade network including metal imports from Cyprus and Turkey.

Some or all of the remains of Rhacotis may lie beneath the densely populated modern city of Alexandria, and thus remain off limits to archaeologists. No attempts to date have discovered remains of an early city in the Alexandrine neighborhood with the same name.

== Significance ==
The importance of Rhacotis remains a matter of debate. If Rhacotis was indeed no more than a building yard, it may have been an inconsequential part of the Egyptian civilization before the arrival of Hellenic invaders who eventually established the Ptolemaic kingdom.
