= Aristagoras (writer) =

Aristagoras (Ancient Greek: Ἀρισταγόρας) was a Greek writer in Egypt who lived somewhere between the 4th and 2nd centuries BCE. The writer Stephanus of Byzantium says that Aristagoras was not much younger than Plato, and from the order in which he is mentioned by Pliny the Elder in the list of authors who wrote upon the pyramids, he would appear to have lived between, or been a contemporary of, Duris of Samos and Artemidorus of Ephesus.
