= Scythes =

Early 5th century BC tyrant of Zankle in Sicily

Scythes (Ancient Greek: Σκύθης, romanized: Skúthēs) was tyrant or ruler of Zancle, Magna Graecia, in Sicily. He was appointed to that post in about 494 BC by Hippocrates of Gela.

The Zanclaeans had contacted Ionian leaders to invite colonists to join them in founding a new city on the Kale Acte (Καλὴ Ἀκτή), or north shore of Sicily. This offer had been accepted by a large number of Samians, together with some exiles from Miletus.

But when the colonists arrived at Locri, Scythes and the Zanclaeans were engaged in hostilities against the Sicels. Meanwhile, the Samians were persuaded by Anaxilas of Rhegium to take advantage of Scythes' absence, and occupy the city of Zancle itself. In response, Scythes asked for the assistance of his ally, Hippocrates, tyrant of Gela.

However, Hippocrates proved to be just as untrustworthy as the Samians. On his arrival, he placed Scythes and his brother, Pythogenes, in chains and sent them as prisoners to Inycum. He then betrayed his allies the Zanclaeans so that they fell into the hands of the Samians.

Scythes, however, was able to escape from Inycum and made his way to Himera. Once there he was able make his way to the court of Darius, king of Persia, where he was received with much distinction and rose to a high place in the king's favour.

Some time afterwards, Scythes was able to visit his native city, but again had to return to the Persian court, where he died at an advanced age, and in the possession of great wealth, while he enjoyed general esteem for the probity of his character. Herodotus designates Anaxilas and Hippocrates as tyrants (τύραννοι) of their respective cities, but he styles Scythes as king (βασιλεύς) or monarch (μούναρχος) of the Zanclaeans.

Scythes is thought by some writers, including Perizonius, to have been the father of Cadmus of Kos. Others, such as Lodewijk Caspar Valckenaer, suppose that Scythes was the uncle of another Scythes in Kos, who was the father of Cadmus.
