= Lachares =

Ancient Athenian politician

Lachares (Ancient Greek: Λαχάρης) was a demagogue and tyrant of Athens at the turn from the 4th to the 3rd century BC.

== Rule in Athens ==
Lachares was one of the most influential leaders in his native city, after Athenian democracy had been re-established by Demetrius Poliorcetes. In 301/300 BC he besieged Charias, who had occupied the Acropolis with his followers; after Charias surrendered, he and three others were sentenced to death by the popular assembly. Allegedly, Lachares was afterwards secretly gained over by the King of Macedonia Cassander, who incited him to aim at the acquisition of the tyranny, hoping to be able through his means to rule Athens.

He does not seem, however, to have been able to effect this purpose until Athens was besieged by Demetrius (296 BC), when he took advantage of the excitement of the popular mind to expel Demochares, the leader of the opposite party, and establish himself as undisputed master of the city. We know but little either of the intrigues by which he raised himself to power or of his proceedings afterwards, but he is described in general terms by Pausanias, as "of all tyrants the most inhuman towards men, and the most sacrilegious towards the gods". He plundered the temples, and especially the Parthenon, of all their most valuable treasures, stripping even the chryselephantine statue of Athena Parthenos of her sacred ornaments.

At the beginning of his rule he had procured a decree to be passed, forbidding, under pain of death, even the mention of treating with Demetrius and he succeeded in inducing, or compelling, the Athenians to hold out until they were reduced to the last extremities of famine. At length, however, he despaired of doing so any longer, and made his escape to Boeotia.

== Escape from Athens ==
The historian Polyaenus tells a number of stories about the tyrant's lucky escapes which appear almost as a literary topos. According to Polyaenus, Lachares fled from Athens stealing the city's put and hiding the gold in a basket covered with dung. Dressed up as a slave, with his face blackened, he slipped out through a minor gate. Chased by a squadron of fast cavalry, he scattered some gold coins on the road to slow his pursuers, which allowed him to reach Thebes. When Demetrius Poliorcetes took that city, too, Lachares hid himself in the sewers, only to come out at night after a few days and make his escape to Delphi. From there he went to king Lysimachus in Thrace, and there he was once again in danger of falling into the hands of his enemy, when Demetrius besieged the town of Sestos on the Hellespont, in which Lachares happened to be. Again, Lachares stayed for several days in a pit, with just enough provisions to support himself, and this time he escaped during a funeral procession disguised as a mourning woman wearing a gown and a black veil over his head. From Sestos he fled to Lysimachia.

Finally we hear of him at Cassandrea as late as 279 BC, when he was expelled from that city by Apollodorus, on a charge of having conspired to betray it into the hands of Antiochus.

== Death ==
Pausanias states that Lachares was murdered by the people of Coroneia for the sake of the wealth he was supposed to have accumulated. The geographer gives no date for his death, which leaves several possibilities: either he died much earlier than Polyaenus believes, or Pausanias is mistaken, or Lachares later returned south, to meet his fate in Boeotia many years after his tyranny.
