= Anaxilas =

Tyrant of Rhegium from 494 to 476 BC

Anaxilas or Anaxilaus (Ancient Greek: Ἀναξίλας, Ἀναξίλαος), son of Cretines, was a tyrant of Rhegium (modern Reggio Calabria) in Magna Graecia. He was originally from Messenia, a region in the Peloponnese.

== Life ==
Anaxilas was master of Rhegium in 494 BC, when he encouraged the Samians and other Ionian fugitives to seize Zancle, a city across the strait in Sicily which was then under the rule of the tyrant Scythes. Shortly after the Samian takeover, Anaxilas besieged the city himself, drove the Samians out, peopled it with fresh inhabitants, and changed its name to Messana, after his native Messene.

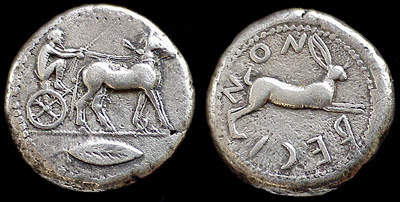
In 484 or 480 BC, Anaxilas won the mule biga event at the Olympic games, and struck this tetradrachm to commemorate his success.

Pausanias tells a somewhat different story. After the second war with the Spartans, Anaxilas assisted the refugees from Messina in the Peloponnese to take Zancle in Sicily.

Anaxilas married Cydippe, daughter of Terillus, tyrant of Himera. In 480 BC he obtained the assistance of the Carthaginians for his father-in-law, who had been expelled from his city by Theron, tyrant of Agrigentum. It was this auxiliary army that Gelo defeated at Himera. Anaxilas wanted to destroy the Locrians, but was prevented by Hiero I of Syracuse, as related by Epicharmus.

Anaxilas' daughter was married to Hiero. Anaxilaus died in 476 BC, leaving Micythus guardian of his children. The children only gained control of their inheritance in 467 BC, when Leophron became tyrant. However, in 461 BC the new rulers were removed by a popular revolt of the citizens of both Rhegium and Messana.
