= Thrasybulus of Miletus =

Tyrant of Miletus in the 7th century BC

Thrasybulus (Greek: Θρασύβουλος ὁ Μιλήσιος) was the tyrant of Miletus in the 7th century BC. Under his rule, Miletus fought a lengthy war against Lydia. This war ended without a decisive victor (a result that Herodotus credits to Thrasybulus's tricking Alyattes into making peace.). Following the war, Miletus and Lydia concluded an alliance.

Thrasybulus was an ally of Periander, the tyrant of Corinth. He features in a famous anecdote from Herodotus's Histories, in which a messenger from Periander asks Thrasybulus for advice on ruling. Thrasybulus, instead of responding, takes the messenger for a walk in a field of wheat, where he proceeds to cut off all of the best and tallest ears of wheat. The message, correctly interpreted by Periander, was that a wise ruler would preempt challenges to his rule by "removing" those prominent men who might be powerful enough to challenge him.
