= Apollodorus of Cassandreia =

Tyrant of Cassandreia, c. 279–276 BC

Apollodorus (Ancient Greek: Ἀπολλόδωρος) was the tyrant of Cassandreia in Chalcidice from about 279 to 276 BC. (Note: Van Oppen de Ruiter instead places the tyranny in 278 to 276 BC, arguing that Eurydice's restoration of the city's liberty followed Arsinoe's flight and that the tyranny began later still.) He rose to power as a professed champion of popular liberty and seized control of the city by a conspiracy that ancient authors say was sealed with human sacrifice; his rule became a byword for cruelty in Greek and Roman moralizing literature. He was overthrown when Antigonus II Gonatas took Cassandreia in 276 BC.

== Background ==
Cassandreia had been founded in 316/315 BC by Cassander on the site of Potidaea and held the status of a city formally independent of, though allied to, the kingdom of Macedonia. In about 281 BC the city, then held by Arsinoe II, was seized by Ptolemy Keraunos, who took its citadel and killed her two younger sons; she fled to Samothrace. Keraunos appears to have installed a Macedonian garrison, which after his death in the Gallic invasion of 279 BC was withdrawn by his mother Eurydice, daughter of Antipater and sister of Cassander. In the ensuing period, Apollodorus came to prominence.

== Rise to power ==
Polyaenus presents Apollodorus, before his coup, as a citizen so careful in word and deed that he was thought "the greatest patriot who ever lived". He supported the decree expelling Lachares from Cassandreia, on the ground that Lachares was a friend and ally of king Antiochus and suspected of intending to betray the city to him. Lachares was the former tyrant of Athens, driven out when Demetrius took that city, and van Oppen de Ruiter takes him to have been in control of Cassandreia at the time of his expulsion. When a certain Theodotus proposed that Apollodorus be given a bodyguard, Apollodorus was the first to oppose the motion. He established the Eurydiceia (Εὐρυδίκεια), a festival commemorating Eurydice as the restorer of the city's liberty; (Note: Polyaenus calls it an ἑορτή. Van Oppen de Ruiter, following Habicht's observation that festivals named after human beings are regularly called πανήγυρις rather than ἑορτή, holds that whether the festival was religious in character, and so whether Eurydice received cult at Cassandreia, cannot be determined.) obtained citizenship for soldiers who had refused to hold the fortress against the people, settling them on land in Pallene as guardians of that liberty; and denounced tyranny at every public meeting as the worst of evils.

Polyaenus also relates that when Apollodorus was accused of plotting against the people's liberty, he appeared before his judges dressed in black, with his wife and daughters likewise in mourning, and submitted himself to their judgment; moved to compassion, they acquitted him. After seizing power, he had those same judges cruelly punished, "as if he owed his life not to their humanity, but to his own conduct".

== Seizure of power ==
Both Diodorus Siculus and Polyaenus describe the conspiracy by which Apollodorus took control, in about 279 BC, as bound by a rite of human sacrifice. In Diodorus's account, he invited a young man, one of his friends, to a sacrifice, killed him as an offering to the gods, gave the conspirators his entrails to eat, and mixed his blood with wine for them to drink. Polyaenus names the victim Callimeles and the cook who prepared the flesh Leontomenes, and describes the participants as a following of slaves and workmen united by these "savage mysteries". Plutarch, in a passage on the punishment of the wicked, likewise numbers Apollodorus among those "who sacrificed the lives of men to the success of their tyrannies and conspiracies".

== Tyranny ==
According to Diodorus, Apollodorus recruited Gauls, then invading the Balkans, as enforcers, accumulated wealth by confiscation, and increased soldiers' pay to secure military support; he extracted money by torturing many citizens, women among them, and took as his guide in the practice of tyranny a Sicilian named Calliphon. Pausanias records that Sparta was reproached by the Messenians for having made an alliance with Apollodorus, and remarks that the sufferings of the people of Cassandreia under him fell little short of the Messenians' own. Aelian reports that he drank more wine than any man, made no secret of the vice, and that drink inflamed his violent nature.

Modern scholarship has connected the tyranny with a distinctive bronze coinage of Cassandreia bearing the head of Dionysus and the legend ΑΠΟΛΛΩΝΟΣ, dated to the 270s BC and struck before the city's incorporation into the Macedonian kingdom; the issue is frequently overstruck on coins of Ptolemy Keraunos.

== Fall ==
In 276 BC Antigonus Gonatas laid siege to Cassandreia, intending to expel Apollodorus, but after ten months was obliged to raise the siege and withdraw. He left behind the pirate captain Ameinias, who cultivated Apollodorus's confidence, offering to reconcile him with Antigonus and to supply grain and wine, until the guard on the walls was relaxed. Ameinias had ladders made to the height of the walls and concealed two thousand men, together with ten Aetolian pirates under Melatas, at a place called Bolus not far from the fortifications. Finding the sentries drowsy, the party crossed to the curtain wall between the towers, set the ladders and gave the signal; Ameinias came up with his two thousand and took the walls. Antigonus, arriving suddenly, took the city and put an end to the tyranny.

The capture of the city is generally taken to mark its definitive incorporation into the Macedonian kingdom, after which the Macedonian calendar replaced the local one in its public documents.

== Reception ==
Apollodorus became a standard exemplar of tyrannical cruelty. Polybius, criticizing historians who exaggerated the wickedness of Hieronymus of Syracuse, wrote that on their account "neither Phalaris nor Apollodorus nor any other tyrant would seem to have been more savage than he", a judgment repeated in the Suda. Seneca twice pairs him with Phalaris, in De Ira as an instance of anger passing into savagery and in De Beneficiis in asking whether a benefit should be repaid to a man who has become "not only bad, but savage, even ferocious, like Apollodorus or Phalaris". Aelian lists him as "the oppressor of Cassandreia", among the tyrants who trusted in the sword, beside the Dionysii of Sicily, Clearchus of Heraclea and Nabis of Sparta.

Plutarch preserves a tradition of dreams sent to trouble him: that Apollodorus saw himself flayed by Scythians and boiled, and heard his own heart speak from the cauldron, saying "I am the cause thou sufferest all this"; and that on another occasion he saw his daughters running about him with their bodies aflame.

== Sources ==
- Klinaki, Eleni K.; Nikolakopoulou, Antonia G. (2025). "Numismatic Evidence from Ancient Cassandreia at Chalcidice, Northern Greece". In Bodzek, Jarosław; Bursche, Aleksander; Zapolska, Anna (eds.). Proceedings of the XVI International Numismatic Congress, 11–16.09.2022, Warsaw, Vol. I: Greek Numismatics. WSA. Vol. 10. Turnhout: Brepols. pp. 225–236. doi:10.1484/M.WSA-EB.5.144876.
- Landucci Gattinoni, Franca (2003). L'arte del potere: vita e opere di Cassandro di Macedonia. Historia Einzelschriften (in Italian). Vol. 171. Stuttgart: Franz Steiner Verlag. ISBN 978-3-515-08381-2.
- Psoma, Selene (2008). "Panegyris Coinages". American Journal of Numismatics. 20: 227–255.
- Psoma, Selene; Karadima, Chryssa; Terzopoulou, Domna (2008). The Coins from Maroneia and the Classical City at Molyvoti: A Contribution to the History of Aegean Thrace. Meletemata. Vol. 62. Athens: de Boccard.
- van Oppen de Ruiter, Branko F. (2015). "The Marriage and Divorce of Ptolemy I and Eurydice: An Excursion in Early-Hellenistic Marital Practices". Chronique d'Égypte. 90 (179). doi:10.1484/J.CDE.5.107573.
