= Cleitarchus of Eretria =

4th-century BC tyrant of Eretria

Cleitarchus or Clitarchus (Greek: Kλειταρχος; lived 4th century BC) was tyrant of Eretria in Euboea.

After Plutarch had been expelled from the tyranny of Eretria by Phocion in 350 BC, popular government was initially established. However, struggles for power ensued between different political parties in the city. Eventually, the supporters of Athens were overpowered by those supporting Macedon. So Philip then sent Hipponicus, one of his generals, to destroy the walls of Porthmus, the harbour for Eretria, and to set up Hipparchus, Automedon and Cleitarchus as tyrants.

Philips' actions against Eretria occurred after the peace between Athens and Philip in 346 BC, since Demosthenes gives it as one of the proofs of a breach of the peace by Macedon. The tyrants, however, were not willing to keep their power quietly, for Demosthenes mentions two separate forces sent by Philip for their support, under Eurylochus and Parmenion, respectively.

Soon after, Cleitarchus managed to gain sole control of the government. However, he does not seem to have been openly hostile towards Athens, though he held Eretria for Philip, for the Athenians sent ambassadors to Cleitarchus to request his consent to an arrangement for uniting Euboea under one federal government, having its base at Chalcis, to which Athens was also to transfer the annual contributions from Oreus and Eretria.

Aeschines says that a talent from Cleitarchus was part of the bribe which he alleges that Demosthenes received for procuring the decree in question. Therefore, Cleitarchus appears to have joined the project of Demosthenes and Callias, to whom he should have been naturally opposed. Cleitarchus may have thought that it was in his interests to join the plan as a means of getting rid of the remnant of Athenian influence in Eretria.

The plan, however, seems to have collapsed, and in 341 BC, Demosthenes carried a decree for an expedition to Euboea with the view of putting down the Macedonian interest on the island. In response, Cleitarchus and Philistides, the tyrant of Oreus, sent ambassadors to Athens to prevent, if possible, the threatened invasion. Aeschines, at whose house the envoys were entertained, appears to have supported their cause in the assembly. But the decree was carried into effect, and the command of the Athenian forces was given to Phocion. Subsequently, the Athenian forces led by Phocion were able to expel both Cleitarchus and Philistides from their respective cities.
