= Hipparchus of Euboea =

Partisan of Philip of Macedon

Hipparchus or Hipparch of Euboea (Greek: Ἵππαρχος; fl. 4th century BC) was one of the warmest partisans of Philip of Macedon, who rewarded him for his zeal by appointing him, together with Automedon and Cleitarchus, to be rulers, or, as Demosthenes calls them, tyrants of Eretria, supported by a force of mercenary troops. From an anecdote mentioned by Plutarch, it appears that Philip entertained for him feelings of warm personal regard.
