= Aristagoras (poet) =

Aristagoras (Ancient Greek: Ἀρισταγόρας) was a comic writer, possibly from Miletus, whose date is uncertain. He wrote a play whose title is usually translated into English as "Blockhead", "Nincompoop", or "Simpleton" (Μαμμάκυθος) that is supposed by some historians to have been an adaptation of the existing play "Breezes" (Αὖραι) by Metagenes. These are listed in some sources as being separate and distinct plays, and some sources seem to indicate they are the same play.

There is generally some confusion with Aristagoras's identity among the fragments we possess of writing that is ostensibly his (or supposed to be his). For his play "Simpleton", several sources attribute this to Platon, and there is some confusion with Metagenes, as above. And there are also some fragments of a play with this title that have no author specified.
