= Aeinautae =

Aeinautae (Ancient Greek: Ἀειναῦται, Aeinautai, from aeí 'always' and naûtai 'sailors') were magistrates at Miletus around 600 BC, consisting of the chief men in the state, who obtained the supreme power on the deposition of the tyrants, Thoas and Damasenor. Whenever they wished to deliberate on important matters, they embarked on board ship (hence their name), put out at a distance from land, and did not return to shore until they had transacted their business.

The historic source is Plutarch Moralia Vol. IV, fasc. 21, Quaestiones Graecae (Αἴτια Ἑλληνικά), 32.298c-d:

Ancient Greek:

Τίνες οἱ ἀειναῦται παρὰ Μιλησίοις;

Τῶν περὶ Θόαντα καὶ Δαμασήνορα τυράννων καταλυθέντων ἑταιρεῖαι δύο τὴν πόλιν κατέσχον, ὧν ἡ μὲν ἐκαλεῖτο Πλουτὶς ἡ δὲ Χειρομάχα. Κρατήσαντες οὖν οἱ δυνατοὶ καὶ τὰ πράγματα περιστήσαντες εἰς τὴν ἑταιρείαν, ἐβουλεύοντο περὶ τῶν μεγίστων ἐμβαίνοντες εἰς τὰ πλοῖα καὶ πόρρω τῆς γῆς ἐπανάγοντες· κυρώσαντες δὲ τὴν γνώμην κατέπλεον, καὶ διὰ τοῦτ´ « ἀειναῦται » προσηγορεύθησαν.

Translation: Who are the Perpetual Sailors among the Milesians? When the despots associated with Thoas and Damasenor had been overthrown, two political parties came into control of the city, one of which was called Plutis, the other Cheiromacha. When, accordingly, the men of influence gained the upper hand and brought matters into the control of their party, they used to deliberate about matters of the greatest importance by embarking in their ships and putting out to a considerable distance from the land. But when they had come to a final decision, they sailed back; and because of this they acquired the appellation of Perpetual Sailors.

Further there are three known stone inscriptions from the island Euboea which feature the word aeinautai. The first one, IG XII.9.923 from Chalkis, is broken so badly that we are left merely with a list of names and the word aeinautai. A second inscription LSAG 88.21a.S433 from Eretria, records a dedication of a herma made by the "association" (koinon) of the aeinautai. It dates to the 5th century BC. The third, IG XII.9.909, is a dedicatory inscription from the 3rd century BC, also from Chalkis.
