= Antileon =

Antileon (Ancient Greek: Ἀντιλέων) was an ancient Greek author who wrote a work on chronology (Περὶ Χρόνων), the second book of which is referred to by Diogenes Laërtius. Whether he is the same person as the Antileon mentioned by Julius Pollux is uncertain.
