= Cypselus =

- Tyrant of Corinth
- Reign: 657–627 BC
- Predecessor: Bacchiadae
- Successor: Periander
- Born: before 670 BC; Corinth
- Died: 627 BC; Corinth
- Consort: Cratea
- Issue: Periander; Gorgus
- Greek: Κύψελος
- House: Cypselid
- Father: Eëtion
- Mother: Labda
- Religion: Greek polytheism

Cypselus (Ancient Greek: Κύψελος, Kypselos) was the first tyrant of Corinth in the 7th century BC.

With increased wealth and more complicated trade relations and social structures, Greek city-states tended to overthrow their traditional hereditary priest-kings; Corinth, the richest archaic polis, led the way. Like the signori of late medieval and Renaissance Italy, the tyrants usually seized power at the head of some popular support. Often the tyrants upheld existing laws and customs and were highly conservative as to cult practices, thus maintaining stability with little risk to their own personal security. As in Renaissance Italy, a cult of personality naturally substituted for the divine right of the former legitimate royal house.

After the last traditional king of Corinth, Telestes, was assassinated by Arieus and Perantas, there were no more kings; instead prytanes taken from the former royal house of the Bacchiadae ruled for a single year each. Cypselus, the son of Eëtion and a disfigured woman named Labda, who was a member of the Bacchiad family, the ruling dynasty, usurped power, became tyrant and expelled the Bacchiadae.

According to Herodotus the Bacchiadae heard two prophecies from the Delphic oracle that the son of Eëtion would overthrow their dynasty, and they planned to kill the baby once it was born; however, Herodotus says that the newborn smiled at each of the men sent to kill it, and none of them could go through with the plan. An etiological myth-element, to account for the name Cypselus (cf. κυψέλη, kypsele, "chest") accounted how Labda then hid the baby in a chest, and when the men had composed themselves and returned to kill it, they could not find it. (Compare the infancy of Perseus.) The cedar Chest of Cypselus, richly worked with mythological narratives and adorned with ivory and gold, was a votive offering at Olympia, where Pausanias gave it a detailed description in his 2nd century AD travel guide.

When Cypselus had grown up, he fulfilled the prophecy. Corinth had been involved in wars with Argos and Corcyra, and the Corinthians were unhappy with their rulers. At the time, around 657 BC, Cypselus was polemarch, the archon in charge of the military, and he used his influence with the soldiery to expel the Bacchiadae. He also expelled his other enemies, but allowed them to set up colonies in northwestern Greece. He also increased trade with the colonies in Italy and Sicily. Some accounts suggest that he was so popular among the people of Corinth and its army that he never required a personal bodyguard. Still, while contemporary sources depicted Cypselus in a positive light, later accounts tended to portray his rule as highly oppressive.

He ruled for thirty years and in 627 BC was succeeded as tyrant by his son Periander, who was considered one of the Seven Sages of Greece. The treasury Cypselus built at Delphi was apparently still standing in the time of Herodotus.

Cypselus' second son Gorgus became tyrant of the Corinthian colony Ambracia, followed after his death by his son Periander of Ambracia. Another known Cypselid from Ambracia was named Archinus, whose wife later married Peisistratus of Athens. While some consider him a tyrant as well, the sources are not definite, and there is no reason to believe Ambracia had any Cypselid tyrants other than the aforementioned two. Cypselus' other grandson by Gorgus was Psammetich, who followed the sage Periander as the last tyrant of Corinth.

== Bibliography ==
- Schmitz, Winfried (2010). "Kypselos und Periandros. Mordende Despoten oder Wohltäter der Stadt?" [Cypselus and Periander. Murderous despots or benefactors of the city?] In: Bernhard Linke, Mischa Meier, Meret Strothmann (eds): Zwischen Monarchie und Republik. Gesellschaftliche Stabilisierungsleistungen und politische Transformationspotentiale in den antiken Stadtstaaten. Historia Einzelschriften, vol. 217. Stuttgart: Steiner, ISBN 978-3-515-09782-6, pp. 19–49.
