= Nearchus of Orchomenus =

Arcadian tyrant

Nearchus (Greek: Νέαρχος, Nearchos; fl. 234 BC) was a ruler of the Greek city of Orchomenus in Arcadia. He was probably a tyrant and is known only from an inscription relating a treaty with the Achaean League in which he agrees to renounce his post while the Orchomenians promise not to prosecute him or his sons.
