= Labda (mythology) =

Mother of Cypselus, tyrant of Corinth

According to Herodotus, Labda (Ancient Greek: Λάβδα) was a daughter of the Bacchiad Amphion, and mother of Cypselus, by Eetion. Her name was derived from the fact of her feet being turned outward, and thus resembling the letter lambda (Λ), which, by the accounts of the most ancient Greek grammarians, was originally pronounced labda [labda].
