= Lycophron of Corinth =

Son of Corinthian tyrant Periander

Lycophron of Corinth (/ˈlaɪkəfrɒn/ LY-kə-fron; Ancient Greek: Λυκόφρων, romanized: Lukóphrōn) was the second son of the Corinthian tyrant Periander.

Periander beat his wife, Melissa, to death in a fit of anger. Lycophron, on learning of the cause of his mother's death through his grandfather Procles, ruler of Epidaurus, refused to speak to Periander. Periander punished Lycophron by first throwing him out of the palace, then forbidding any Corinthian to speak with him. Finally, Periander sent Lycophron in exile to Corcyra. Many years later, Periander asked Lycophron to return to Corinth to inherit his tyranny, but he refused; eventually Lycophron agreed on the condition that Periander would take his place in Corcyra. On learning that Periander would be coming to Corcyra, the inhabitants of that island murdered Lycophron. In revenge, Periander had 300 sons of the people of Corcyra sent to Alyattes of Lydia to be made into eunuchs.

The story of Periander and Lycophron parallels a number of other stories in Herodotus where a son is killed because of their father's actions, such as those of the sons of Harpagus and of Prexaspes.
