= Scydrothemis =

Scydrothemis (r. 301–280 BC) was a ruler of the Greek colony of Sinope on the southern shore of the Black Sea (modern day Sinop, Turkey). Scydrothemis was a tyrant. His name has a barbarian, perhaps a Paphlagonian, sound and Tacitus gives him the title of king, which is in fact more accurately descriptive than tyrant.

Ptolemy I sent ambassadors to visit the shrine of Pythian Apollo at Delphi. They took with them gifts for Scydrothemis. The leader was afraid of this embassy, at the same time fearing divine will as well as the threats from his own people who opposed the transaction, although he found the gifts tempting. Years passed and Ptolemy continued his appeals to Scydrothemis, upgrading his gifts all the time. A terrible apparition confronted Scydrothemis in a dream, forbidding him to delay further the purposes of the god. When he still hesitated, he was plagued by all manner of disasters, by plague and by the manifestation of a divine wrath which became daily more grievous. Then he called his people together and explained to them the orders of the deity, his own vision and that of Ptolemy, and their ever-growing afflictions. The common folk, turning a deaf ear to their king and jealous of Egypt, staged a sit-down strike around the temple in self-defence.
