= Aristagoras of Cyme =

Tyrant of Cyme

Aristagoras
- Αρισταγόρας

Tyrant of Cyme
- In office fl. 500
- Appointed by: Darius the Great

Personal details
- Parent: Heracleides

Aristagoras (Ancient Greek: Ἀρισταγόρας) was a tyrant of Cyme, and son of Heracleides, one of the Ionian chiefs left by Darius the Great to guard the bridge over the Danube River. On the revolt of the Ionians from Persia, in 500 BCE, Aristagoras was taken by stratagem and delivered up to his fellow citizens, who, however, dismissed him uninjured.
