= Plutarch of Eretria =

4th-century BC tyrant of Eretria

Plutarch (Ancient Greek: Πλούταρχος; fl. 4th century BC) was a tyrant of Eretria in Euboea. Whether he was the immediate successor of Themison, and also whether he was in any way connected with him by blood, are points which we have no means of ascertaining. Trusting perhaps to the influence of his friend Meidias, he applied to the Athenians in 354 BC for aid against his rival, Callias of Chalcis, who had allied himself with Philip of Macedon. The application was granted in spite of the resistance of Demosthenes, and the command of the expedition was entrusted to Phocion, who defeated Callias at Tamynae in 350 BC. But the conduct of Plutarch in the battle had placed the Athenians in great jeopardy, and though it may have been nothing more than rashness, Phocion would seem to have regarded it as treachery, for he thenceforth treated Plutarch as an enemy and expelled him from Eretria.
