= Phintias of Agrigentum =

Phintias was an ancient Greek tyrant of the Sicilian town of Acragas c. 288 – c. 279 BC in Magna Graecia. He appears to have established his power over that city during the period of confusion which followed the death of Agathocles (289 BC), about the same time that Hicetas obtained the chief command at Syracuse. War soon broke out between the two despots, in which Phintias was defeated near Hybla.

But this success having induced Hicetas to engage with a more formidable enemy, the Carthaginians, he was defeated in his turn, and Phintias, who was probably in alliance with that power, was now able to extend his authority over a considerable part of Sicily. Among the cities subject to his rule we find mention of Agyrium, which is a sufficient proof of the extent of his dominions.

He at the same time made a display of his wealth and power by founding a new city, to which he gave his own name Phintias, and to which he removed all the inhabitants from Gela, which he razed to the ground. His oppressive and tyrannical government subsequently alienated the minds of his subjects, and caused the revolt of many of the dependent cities. But he had the wisdom to change his line of policy, and, by adopting a milder rule, retained possession of the sovereignty until his death. The period of this is not mentioned, but it may probably be inferred from the fragments of Diodorus, that it preceded the expulsion of Hicetas from Syracuse, and may therefore be referred to 279 BC.

There are extant coins of Phintias which indicate that he assumed the title of king, in imitation of Agathocles. They all have the figure of a boar running on the reverse, and a head of Apollo or Diana on the obverse. Those which show the head of Phintias himself are probably spurious.
