= Hicetas (tyrant of Syracuse) =

3rd-century BC tyrant of Syracuse

Hicetas (Greek: Ἱκέτας or Ἱκέτης) was tyrant of Syracuse from 288-279 BC. He rose to power following the death of Agathocles of Syracuse. He defeated his rival to the west, Phintias of Agrigentum, in 285 BC, but was badly defeated by the Carthaginians in 284 BC, and was overthrown in 279 BC. A large gold coinage produced during his final days in power survives.

== Life ==
In 289 BC Agathocles died due to jaw cancer, and his grandson, Archagathus, was assassinated. After this, Menon of Syracuse assumed command of the army with which Archagathus had been besieging Aetna and led it to attack Syracuse. In response to this, the Syracusans sent Hicetas against him with a considerable army. Menon allied with the Carthaginians and forced the Syracusans to make peace. At around the same time, there was a revolution at Syracuse which led to the expulsion of the Campanian mercenaries, who became known as the Mamertines, but it is unclear what role Hicetas himself played in this.

Probably in 288/7 BC Hicetas secured the position of strategos autokrator (general with full powers), which made him the supreme authority in Syracuse. The date is derived from Diodorus Siculus, who states that he ruled for nine years.

At Acragas, Phintias had declared himself king and led a campaign of expansion. In 285 BC, Hicetas defeated him in battle at the River Hyblaeus (Dirillo) in the territory of Camarina. This ended Phintias' efforts to expand into the Syracusan sphere, although Hicetas was either unable or uninterested in attempting to remove him altogether. In the aftermath of this defeat, in 282 BC, Phintias evacuated the population of Gela and resettled them to the west at Licata.

Hicetas now turned north and led an army to Leontini, where the Carthaginians had established a base, but they defeated him at the river Terias in 284 BC and forced him to withdraw his forces behind the walls of Syracuse, leaving the hinterland of the city to be raided by the Carthaginians.

In 279 BC, an opposition group in Syracuse, led by one Thoenon, overthrew Hicetas. It appears that Thoenon was aided in this by Sosistratus, who had taken over from Phintias as ruler of Acragas, but Thoenon and Sosistratus were soon at variance. Shortly after this, the city was besieged by the Carthaginians and Thoenon and Sosistratus were forced to summon Pyrrhus of Epirus to their aid - he arrived in 278 BC.

=== Coinage ===
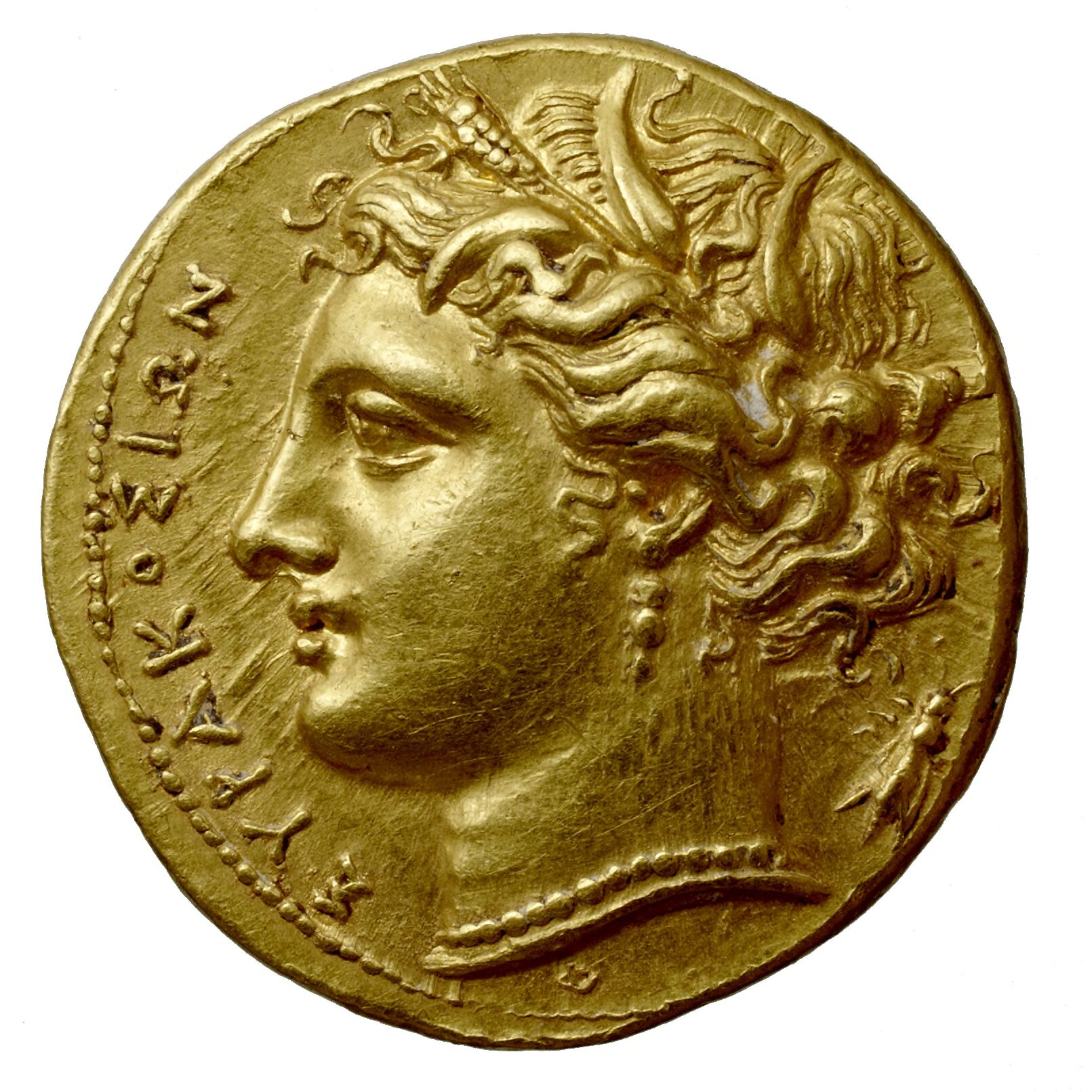
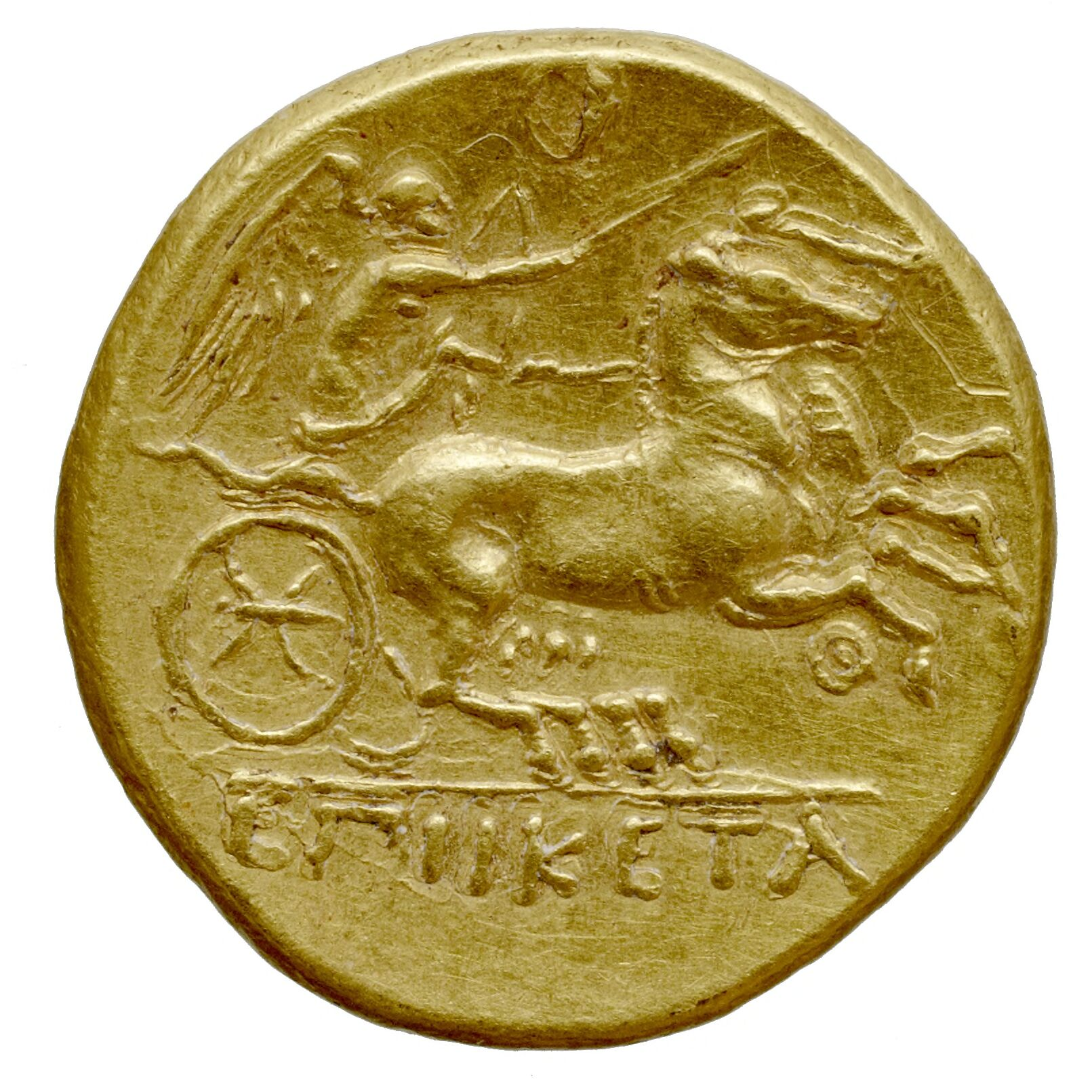
Gold half-litra coin of Hicetas.
Obverse: Head of Persephone, ΣΥΡΑΚΟΣΙΩΝ ("of the Syracusans").
Reverse: Nike driving a two-horse chariot, with various symbols and the legend, ΕΠΙ ΙΚΕΤΑ, "under the authority of Hicetas."

Hicetas struck gold and bronze coins at Syracuse. The gold coins are half-litrae, weighing 4.24 grammes. On the obverse, they depict the head of Persephone with various symbols and the legend ΣΥΡΑΚΟΣΙΩΝ ("of the Syracusans"). On the reverse, they show Nike driving a two-horse chariot, with various symbols and the legend, ΕΠΙ ΙΚΕΤΑ, "under the authority of Hicetas." This makes it clear that Hicetas — unlike his predecessor Agathocles and his contemporary Phintias — never assumed the title of "king." A total of 28 dies were used to mint this coinage, with two anvils operating simultaneously for most of the period. The pattern of die-linking indicates that the whole coinage was issued in a rush, at the very end of his reign. Theodore V. Buttrey Jr. associates them with his conflict with the Carthaginians. On the third-to-last and second-to-last reverse dies of the coinage, Hicetas' name was erased. In the very last issue of the series, the reverse has ΣΥΡΑΚΟΣΙΩΝ ("of the Syracusans") instead of his name. These three issues must have been produced after he was overthrown in 279 BC, but before the arrival of Pyrrhus in 278 BC. The design was resumed, essentially unchanged by Hiero II in 276 BC.

A group of silver 15-litra coins have been attributed to Hicetas, but this is not absolutely certain. They depict the head of Persephone on the obverse with various symbols. The reverse shows a four-horse chariot and a star symbol with the legend ΣΥΡΑΚΟΣΙΩΝ ("of the Syracusans").

Two bronze coinages are probably associated with Hicetas. The first shows the head of Persephone on the obverse with the legend ΣΥΡΑΚΟΣΙΩΝ ("of the Syracusans") and a two-horse chariot on the reverse. The second coinage, which overstrikes much of the first, is known as the "eagle and fulmen" coinage. It depicts a beardless head of Zeus wearing a wreath on the obverse with the legend ΔΙΟΣ ΕΛΛΑΝΙΟΥ ("of Zeus Hellanios," i.e. Greek Zeus). On the reverse there is an eagle perched on a thunderbolt, usually with a star or letter to the left, with the legend ΣΥΡΑΚΟΣΙΩΝ ("of the Syracusans"). Excavation finds from Gela seem to show that it was minted before 282 BC.

== Bibliography ==
- Diodorus Siculus, Excerpta Hoescheliana 21.12.13, 22.2.6.
- Smith, William, ed. (1870). "Hicetas (2)". Dictionary of Greek and Roman Biography and Mythology.
- Buttrey, T. V. (1973). "The Morgantina Gold Hoard and the Coinage of Hicetas". The Numismatic Chronicle. 13: 1–17. ISSN 0078-2696. JSTOR 42664659.
- Zambon, Efram (2008). Tradition and Innovation: Sicily between Hellenism and Rome. Stuttgart: Franz Steiner Verlag.
- Walthall, D. Alex (2024). Sicily and the Hellenistic Mediterranean world: economy and administration during the reign of Hieron II. Cambridge; New York, NY: Cambridge University Press. pp. 19–22, 37–38. ISBN 9781316511053.
