= Micythus =

5th-century BC tyrant of Rhegium, Sicily

Micythus (Ancient Greek: Μίκυθος), son of Choerus, was a 5th-century BC tyrant of Rhegium (modern Reggio Calabria) and Zancle (modern Messina) in Magna Graecia. He also founded the city of Pyxus (c. 471 BC).

He was at first a slave in the service of Anaxilas, tyrant of Rhegium, but gradually rose to so high a place in the confidence of his master, that at his death (476 BC) Anaxilas left him guardian of his infant sons, with the responsibility of holding sovereign power in trust for them until they should attain manhood.

The administration of Micythus appears to have been both wise and vigorous. He gained the affection of his subjects, and managed the government of both Rhegium and Messana undisturbed by any popular commotions. One of the principal events of his reign was the assistance he provided to the Tarentines in their war against the Iapygians (473 BC), which was terminated by a disastrous defeat, in which 3000 Rhegians perished, with the survivors being pursued by the Iapygians up to the very gates of the city. But notwithstanding this blow, shortly after (471 BC) he was still powerful enough to found a new colony, the city of Pyxus, or Buxentum, as it was afterwards called.

Hieron, tyrant of Syracuse, who had been on friendly terms with Anaxilas but was jealous of Micythus, invited Anaxilas' sons, who were now adults, to his court, urging them to demand that their guardian surrender his sovereign power, as well as an account of his administration. When the young princes returned to Rhegium (467 BC), Micythus immediately complied with their request, and after rendering an exact account of the period of his rule, he resigned his supreme power and departed with all his private wealth to the Peloponnese, where he settled at Tegea and resided there for the rest of his life in honour and tranquillity.

He is also mentioned by Pausanias (who calls him Smicythus) as having distinguished himself by the number of statues and other offerings that he dedicated at Olympia.
