= Phayllus =

Man in Greek mythology

In ancient Greek legend and folklore, Phayllus (Ancient Greek: Φάυλλος, romanized: Pháullos) is a man from Oetaea who stole the cursed necklace of Harmonia from the temple of Athena to gift his mistress. The necklace then brought immense suffering to the woman, its last known owner, and her family. He seems to be a mythologized account of the Phocian strategos Phayllus who lived in the fourth century BC, who rewarded his allies with treasures taken from Delphi.

== Biography ==
The historical Phayllus was a Phocian strategos, who took seven thousand soldiers to support Lycophron against Philip II of Macedonia during the Third Sacred War in 353 BC, but was defeated. When his brother Onomarchus died, he became supreme commander over the Phocians and repelled Philip from Thermopylae with the help of the Spartans, Athenians, Achaeans and mercenaries; he rewarded them with treasures and gold taken from the temples at Delphi. He further suffered defeats at Orchomenus, Cephisus and Coronea. Eventually he died of an illness after assaulting Naryca.

== The legend ==
=== The necklace ===
The necklace of Harmonia, the daughter of Ares and Aphrodite, was a jewel of gold, enchanted to bring peril to its owners, crafted and given to her by the god Hephaestus, who wanted to take revenge for her mother's infidelity against him. Eriphyle, bribed with it by Polyneices, a descendant of Harmonia, convinced her husband Amphiaraus to take part in the war against Thebes where he perished. Their son Alcmaeon killed Eriphyle in anger, and eventually he was killed himself by his wife Alphesiboea's brothers for leaving her for another woman. Alcmaeon's sons killed their father's murderers and dedicated the necklace to Delphi.

=== Phayllus ===
Phayllus desired a married woman, the wife of Ariston, an Oetaean commander, and sent many envoys to her with promises of gold and silver if she should have him, and that she might ask anything she desired from him. Ariston's wife replied then that what she wanted was the notorious cursed necklace of Harmonia, which was kept in the sanctuary of Athena Pronaea in Delphi at the time after the murders of Eriphyle and Alcmaeon. Phayllus agreed and then looted the offerings at Delphi, the necklace among them, and offered it to his mistress who wore it for some time and achieved much fame for that. But the curse's ill fortune befell her as well, and eventually either the eldest or the youngest son of the family, who disliked his mother, succumbed to madness and set the entire house ablaze, burning everyone alive in it.

In one variation of the tale, the man who stole the necklace is not Phayllus but Ariston himself to please his wife. Unlike Phayllus, Ariston took the jewels from the temple with the permission of the local rulers.

== See also ==
- Brísingamen
- Alexander the Great in legend
- King Arthur

== Bibliography ==
- Diodorus Siculus, Library of History, Volume IV-VIII: Books 9-17, translated by C. H. Oldfather, Loeb Classical Library No. 341. Cambridge, Massachusetts, Harvard University Press, 1939. Online version at the Perseus Digital Library.
- Hornblower, Simon; Spawforth, Antony; Eidinow, Esther (2012). The Oxford Classical Dictionary. OUP Oxford. p. 257. ISBN 978-0-19-954556-8.
- Parthenius of Nicaea, Love Romances, translated by Sir Stephen Gaselee (1882–1943), Loeb Classical Library, 1916. Online version at topos text.
- Plutarch, Moralia, translated from the Greek by several hands. Corrected and revised by. William W. Goodwin, PH. D. Boston. Little, Brown, and Company. Cambridge. Press Of John Wilson and son. 1874. 4. Online version at Perseus Digital Library.
- Roman, Luke; Roman, Monica (2010). Encyclopedia of Greek and Roman Mythology. Infobase Publishing. ISBN 9781438126395.
