= Callias of Chalcis =

4th-century BC tyrant of Chalcis

Callias of Chalcis (Greek: Kαλλίας; fl. 4th century BC), son of Mnesarchus, together with his brother Taurosthenes, succeeded his father as tyrants of Chalcis. Callias formed an alliance with Philip of Macedon against Plutarch, tyrant of Eretria, with the view of extending his authority over the whole of Euboea, a design which, according to Aeschines, he disguised as a plan for uniting in one league the states of the island and establishing a general Euboean congress based at Chalcis.

In response to the threat from Callias, Plutarch sought aid from Athens, which was granted in opposition to the advice of Demosthenes. An army was sent into Euboea under the command of Phocion, who defeated Callias at Tamynae in 350 BC.

After the defeat at Tamynae, Callias went to the Macedonian court, where for some time he had been held in high regard by Philip. However, having in some way offended the Macedonian king, Callias travelled to Thebes, in the hope of gaining their support.

After also falling out with the Thebans and fearing an attack both from them and from Philip, he sought the support of Athens and, through the influence of Demosthenes, not only obtained an alliance and an acknowledgement of the independence of Chalcis, but even persuaded the Athenians to transfer to Chalcis the annual contributions from Oreus and Eretria. In return, Callias promised (apparently never realized) assistance in men and money from Achaea, Megara, and Euboea. Callias' actions seemed to have taken place in 343 BC, at the time of Philip's planned attempt to take Ambracia.

Aeschines ascribes his rival's support of Callias to be the result of corruption, but Demosthenes may have thought that Euboea, united under a strong government, might serve as an effective barrier to Philip's ambition.

In 341 BC, the defeat by Phocion of the Macedonian party in Eretria and Oreus under Cleitarchus and Philistides, gave control over the island to Callias.

Callias seems to have been still living in 330 BC, the date of Demosthenes' oration, On the Crown. This can be deduced by comments made by Aeschines, who mentions a proposal by Demosthenes to confer on Callias and his brother Taurosthenes the honour of Athenian citizenship.
