= List of rulers of Paphlagonia =

List of rulers of Paphlagonia, an ancient region and Hellenistic kingdom in northwestern Asia Minor.

== Legendary kings of Paphlagonia ==
(according to Flavius Josephus)

- Riphat, son of Gomer, grandson of Japheth (legendary ancestor of «Riphatheans, now called Paphlagonians»).

(according to classic Greek mythology)

- Tantalus the Elder, son of Zeus.
- Pelops, son of Tantalus.
- Broteas, son of Tantalus.
- Tantalus the Younger, son of Broteas.

(according to Homer's Iliad)

- Pylaemenes, son of Bilsates or Melius (king of the Eneti tribe of Paphlagonia).

== Satraps of Paphlagonia under the Achaemenid Empire and the Macedonian Empire ==
(native Paphlagonian dynasty)

- ca. 425–400 BCE: Corylas I.
- ca. 400–380 BCE: Cotys I, son or brother of Corylas I.
- ca. 380–364 BCE: Thuys I, son of Corylas I or Cotys I.

(Cappadocian dynasty)

- 364–362 BCE: Datames I of Cappadocia, son of Camissares of Cilicia.

(Achaemenid non-dynastic satraps)

- 362–353 BCE: Sysinas I.
- 353–334 BCE: Arsites I.

(Macedonian satraps)

- 334–325 BCE: Calas I, son of Harpalus of Elimiotis.
- 325–323 BCE: Demarchus I.
- 323–316 BCE: Eumenes I of Cardia.
- 316–306 BCE: Antigonus I Monophthalmus (king of Asia from 306 BCE).

To the kingdom of Antigonus I Monophthalmus in 306–302 BCE…

To the kingdom of Pontus in 302–276 BCE…

To Galatia from 276 BCE…

== Kings of Paphlagonia ==
(Galatian dynasty)

- ca. 200–170 BCE: Morzios I (in 182–179 BCE ruled only in South-Eastern part of country).
  - 182–179 BCE: Gaizatorix I (an ally of Pharnaces I of Pontus; ruled in North-Western part of country).
- ca. 170–150 BCE: Morzios II, son of Morzios I.
- ca. 150–140 BCE: Pylaemenes I, son or brother of Morzios II.
- ca. 140–130 BCE: Pylaemenes II, son of Pylaemenes I (bequeathed his kingdom to Pontus after death).

(Pontian dynasty)

- 130–121 BCE: Mithridates I (V) Euergetes, son of Pharnaces I of Pontus.
- 121–119 BCE: Mithridates II (VI) Eupator Dionysus, son of Mithridates I (V) [1st time].
- 121–119 BCE: Mithridates III (VII) Chrestus, son of Mithridates I (V) [co-ruler with brother].
  - 121–119 BCE: Laodice (VI), daughter of Antiochus IV of Syria, widow of Mithridates I (V), mother of Mithridates II (VI) and Mithridates III (VII) [regentess].

(Galatian dynasty)

- 119–108 BCE: Astreodon I, relative (probably brother) of Pylaemenes II.

(Bithynian dynasty)

- 108– 89 BCE: Pylaemenes III Euergetes, son of Nicomedes III of Bithynia.

(Pontian dynasty)

- 89 – 84 BCE: Mithridates II (VI) Eupator Dionysus, son of Mithridates I (V) [2nd time].

(Bithynian dynasty)

- 84 – 74 BCE: Nicomedes I (IV) Philopator, son of Nicomedes III of Bithynia.

To Roman Republic in 74–73 BCE…

(Pontian dynasty)

- 73 – 70 BCE: Mithridates II (VI) Eupator Dionysus, son of Mithridates I (V) [3rd time].

To Roman Republic in 70–68 BCE…

(Pontian dynasty)

- 68 – 66 BCE: Mithridates II (VI) Eupator Dionysus, son of Mithridates I (V) [4th time].

To Roman Republic in 66–65 BCE…

== Client kings under Roman authority ==
(Bithynian dynasty)

- 65 – 51 BCE: Pylaemenes IV, son of Pylaemenes III (co-ruler with brother).
- 65 – 48 BCE: Attalus I, son of Pylaemenes III (co-ruler with brother to 51 BCE) [1st time].

(Pontian dynasty)

- 48 – 47 BCE: Pharnaces I (II) of Bosporus, son of Mithridates II (VI).

(Bithynian dynasty)

- 47 – 40 BCE: Attalus I, son of Pylaemenes III [2nd time].

(Tectosagian dynasty)

- 40 – 36 BCE: Castor I (II) of Galatia, son of Castor (I) (tetrarch of the Tectosagi tribe in Galatia) and daughter of Deiotarus I of Galatia (tetrarch of the Tolistobogii tribe in Galatia, then king of Galatia).

To Roman Republic (under authority of Marcus Antonius) in 36–31 BCE…

(Tectosagian dynasty)

- 31 – 6 BCE: Deiotarus I (III) Philadelphus, son of Castor I (II).
- 31 – 27 BCE: Deiotarus II (IV) Philopator, son of Deiotarus I (III) [co-ruler with father].

To Roman Empire (under authority of Augustus) in 6 BCE (merged with Galatia).

== See also ==
- Paphlagonia
- Paphlagonia (theme)

== Sources ==
- Broughton, T. Robert S., The Magistrates of the Roman Republic, Vol. I (1951)
- Smith, William, Dictionary of Greek and Roman Biography and Mythology, Vol III (1867)
- Truhart P., Regents of Nations. Systematic Chronology of States and Their Political Representatives in Past and Present. A Biographical Reference Book, Part 1: Antiquity Worldwide (2000).
