= Garius =

Town of ancient Paphlagonia

Coordinates: 41°59′20″N 33°34′08″E

Garius or Garios (Ancient Greek: Γάριος) was a town of ancient Paphlagonia, located 80 stadia to the east of Callistratia. It was inhabited during Roman and Byzantine eras.

Its site is located near Katırga in Asiatic Turkey.
