= Siege of Amasra =

1460 capture of the Genoese colony of Amasra by the Ottoman Empire

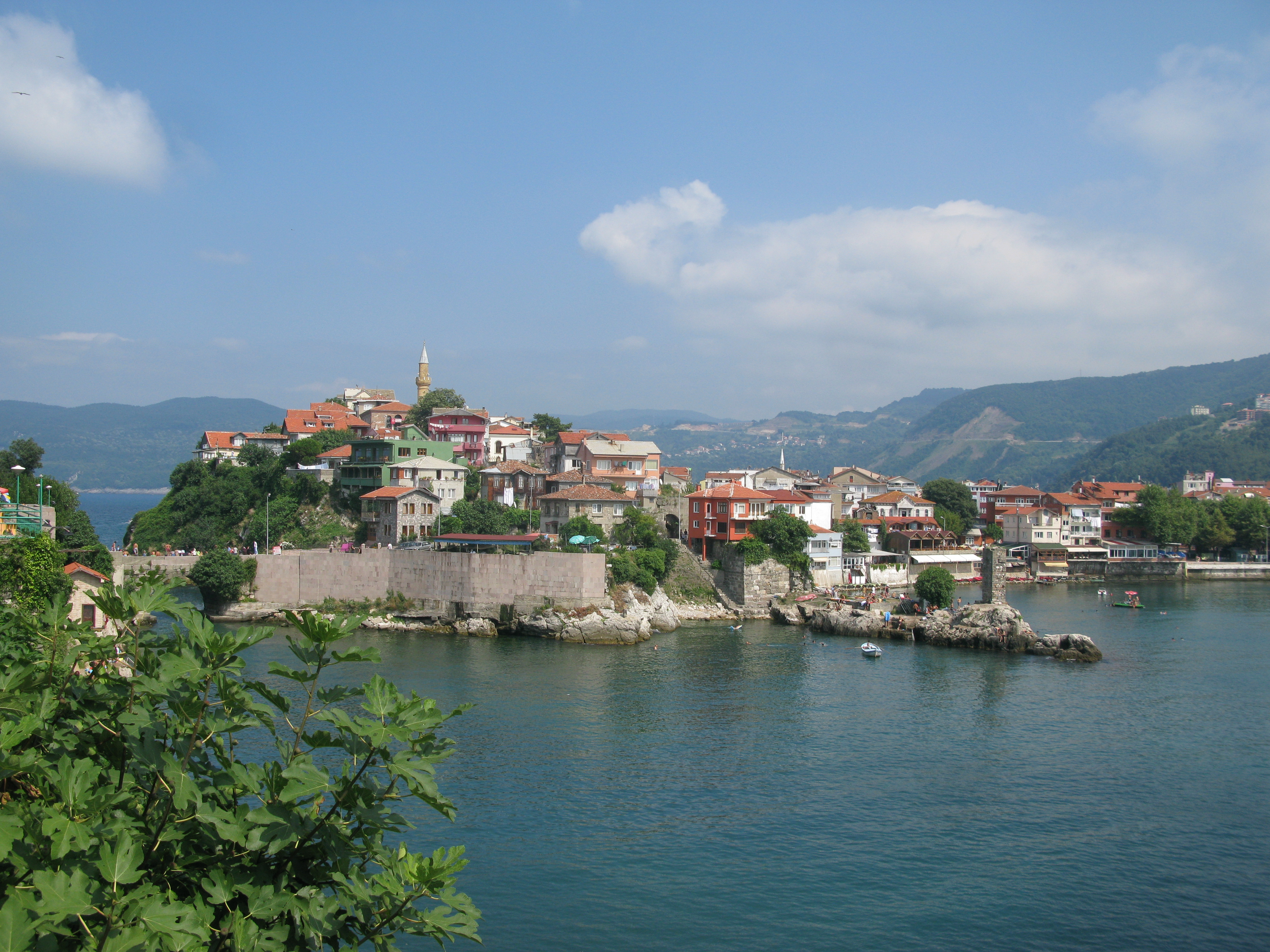
- Amasra Fortress
Date	16–17 October 1460
Location	Amasra, Turkey
Result	Ottoman victory
Territorial changes	Annexation of Amasra by the Ottoman Empire

Belligerents
Ottoman Empire	Republic of Genoa

Commanders and leaders
(Ottoman Empire) Mehmed II (Ottoman Empire) Mahmud Pasha	Unknown

Strength
100 galleys 50 transport ships 30,000 marines 5,000 infantry	Unknown

The siege of Amasra was the land and sea besiegement that resulted in the Ottoman Army, under the command of Fatih Sultan Mehmed, and the Ottoman Navy, under the command of Grand Vizier Veli Mahmud Pasha, capturing the Genoese colony of Amasra, and annexing it into Ottoman lands in 1460.

== Process leading up to the siege ==
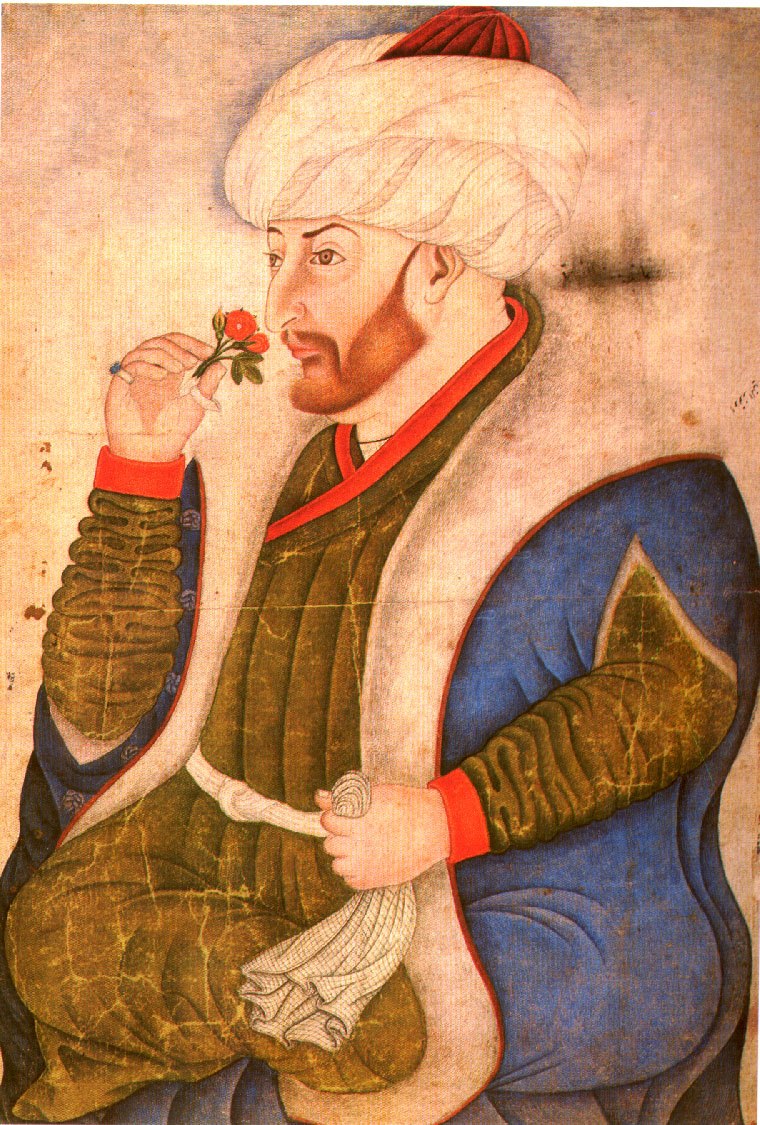
Miniature of Mehmed the Conqueror (Nakkaş Sinan Bey)

After the Conquest of Istanbul, Mehmed the Conqueror's attention was directed to the establishment of Ottoman sovereignty on the Black Sea coasts. In fact, only Samsun, one of the important ports on the Black Sea coast of Anatolia, was under Ottoman rule.

Three days after the conquest of Istanbul (June 1, 1453), Galata was taken from the Genoese, and free trade was granted in the Ottoman Empire through a mandate. In the summer of 1454, the Ottoman Navy, which went to Kefe, the center of the Genoese colonies in Crimea, besieged the city, together with the forces of the Crimean Khan Haji I Giray, and forced the Genoese to pay 3,000 gold annual tribute to the Ottoman Empire and 1,200 gold to the Crimean Khanate. In the same summer, the Ottoman Navy, which continued its forward campaign, blockaded Akkerman Port, where Moldavia opened to the Black Sea. Boğdan Bey, Peter III Aaron, whose trade was completely dependent on the Turkish Straits and dealing with the civil war in his country, submitted to the Ottomans and agreed, under duress, to send 2,000 gold of tribute to the Empire yearly on October 5, 1455. As a result, the Moldavians were allowed free trade in the Ottoman Empire. When the Empire of Trebizond accepted to become a tributary state of the Ottoman Empire in 1456, all the governments on the Black Sea coasts recognized Ottoman domination.

Amasra (Amastris), located on the Black Sea coast of Anatolia and in the region between Istanbul and Sinop, is located on a small peninsula. There were also a few villages in Amasra other than the castle and city under the rule of the Genoese. These villages were taxed annually by the Ottoman treasury.

In response to the Genoese who wanted Galata, which was right next to Istanbul, to remain as Genoese land, after the Conquest of Istanbul, as it was in the Byzantine period, Sultan Mehmed the Conqueror declared that Galata was his own property and that it was part of the Ottoman Empire, annexed not by force, but by the will of the people. Therefore, the Genoese started to display hostile attitudes towards the Ottomans.

== Siege ==
Fatih Sultan Mehmed suspected that the Genoese were joining an alliance and plotting against the Ottomans due to their increasing hostility towards the Empire, and declared war on them.

Returning from the Second Mora Expedition in 1460, at the end of August, Fatih Sultan Mehmed headed for Amasra, but kept this decision a secret. First of all, he sent the Ottoman Navy, consisting of 100 galleys and 50 transport ships (to carry 30,000 marines), to the Black Sea under the command of Grand Vizier Veli Mahmud Pasha, and gave secret orders to the Pasha, who did not know where he was going and for what purpose, to open these orders at certain stages (this method was one of the counter-intelligence measures employed by the Ottoman Empire in response to multiple failed operations and sieges due to espionage).

The Sultan gave the impression that he was hunting, and went to Üsküdar. With a small number of Anatolian soldiers with him and with a very rapid march, he headed north from the Akyazı-Bolu route. While the soldiers were resting in Bolu, Sinop ruler İsfendiyar İsmail Bey withdrew to Sinop Fortress, believing that the expedition was aimed at his own country. There were also camel trains loaded with bronze in the Ottoman army, to cast cannons if necessary. The Sultan, who went down to the Bartın River valley with his army after a difficult hike in the mountainous terrain of Bolu, learned that the Navy had anchored in the offshores of Amasra, which prompted him to leave some dead weight in Bartın and march onto Amasra. A detachment of messengers was also sent to Genoan officials at the fort in Amasra to surrender. It was announced that if they did not surrender, the castle would be shelled from the sea and land, and that the Sultan would not show mercy. The Sultan, on the other hand, stopped when he reached the hill where the Amasra peninsula and its castles were visible and viewed the siege from afar. Surprised by a sudden siege from the sea and land, the officials in the castle decided to surrender without resistance and sent a delegation to the Sultan under the Genoan Consul. As a result, the Genoese domination in Amasra, which had been going on since 1204, came to an end.

== Aftermath of the siege ==
The Sultan failed to conquer the Republic of Genoa and returned to Istanbul with a small fleet of the Ottoman Navy.

Amasra, on the other hand, was attached to the Bolu Sanjak and an armory was built and guards were stationed all around the castle. For the protection of the city, the guards of the Eflani castle, located between Kastamonu and Safranbolu and on the Ottoman-Isfendiyarids border, were transferred to Amasra.

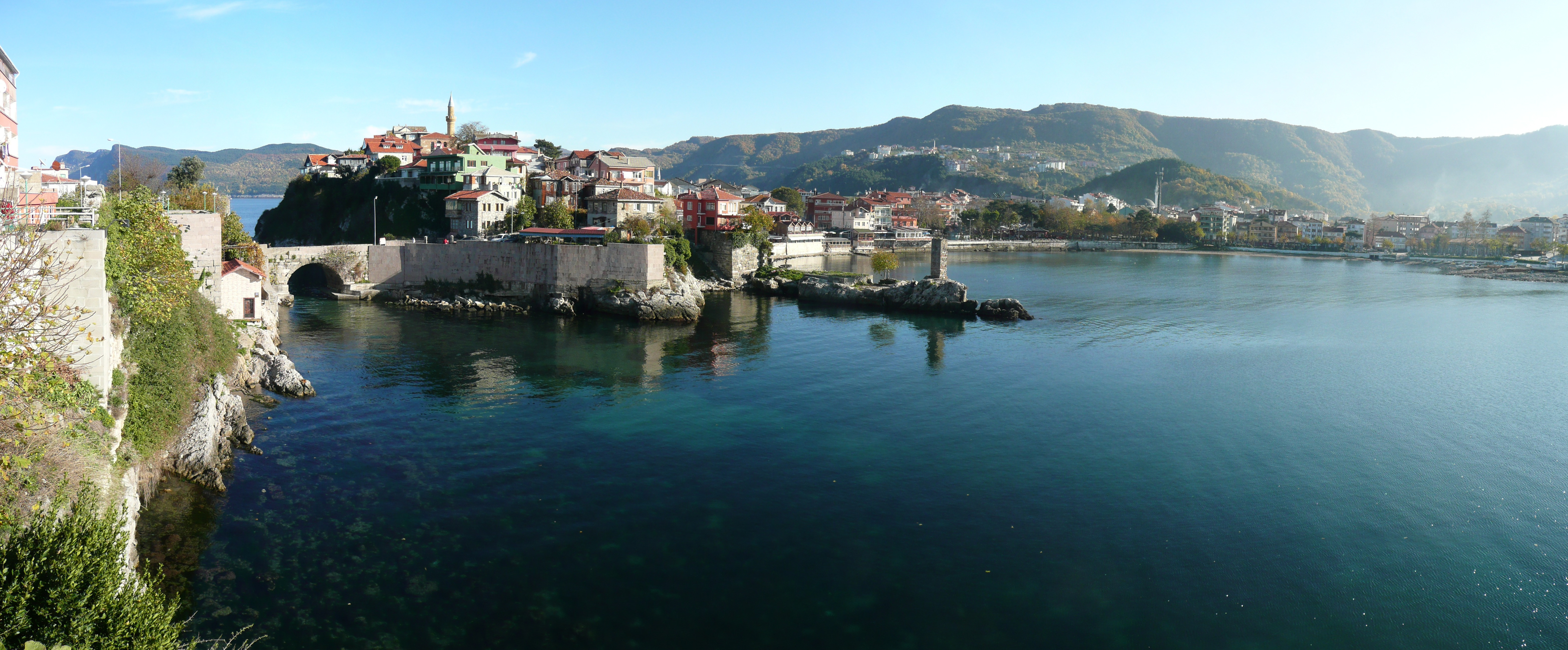
Panoramic view of Amasra fortress and harbor

== See also ==
- Ottoman overtake of Sinope
- Siege of Trebizond (1461)
- Siege of Kefe
