= Bostanlar, Amasra =

Bostanlar
- Village
- Location in Turkey
- Coordinates: 41.7127°N 32.3856°E
- Country: Turkey
- Province: Bartın
- District: Amasra
- Population (2021): 137
- Time zone: UTC+3 (TRT)

Bostanlar is a village in the Amasra District, Bartın Province, Turkey. Its population is 137 (2021).

== Geography ==
The village is 9 km from Bartın city center and 9 km from Amasra town center.
