= Gomu =

Gomu or Gömü may refer to:

- Gömü, Amasra, village in Bartın Province, Turkey
- Gömü, Emirdağ, village in Afyonkarahisar Province, Turkey
- Gomu or Moo language, Adamawa language of Nigeria
