= Cumayanı =

Cumayanı refers to several places in Turkey:

- Cumayanı, Amasra
- Cumayanı, Karabük
- Cumayanı, Köşk
