= Ziporea =

Town of ancient Paphlagonia

Coordinates: 41°34′17″N 33°07′09″E

Ziporea was a town of ancient Paphlagonia, inhabited in Roman and Byzantine times.

Its site is located near Karafasıl, Asiatic Turkey.
