= Tarlaağzı, Amasra =

Tarlaağzı
- Village
- Location within Turkey
- Coordinates: 41°43′N 32°21′E
- Country: Turkey
- Province: Bartın
- District: Amasra
- Population (2021): 304
- Time zone: UTC+3 (TRT)

Tarlaağzı is a village in the Amasra District, Bartın Province, Turkey. Its population is 304 (2021).

== Geography ==
The village is 14 km from Bartın city center and 6 km from Amasra town centre. Kuşkayası Monument is located near the village.
