= Erythini =

Former coastal town in ancient Paphlagonia

Coordinates: 41°46′46″N 32°29′03″E

Erythini or Erythinoi (Ancient Greek: Ἐρυθῖνοι), also Erythrini or Erythrinoi (Ἐρυθρῖνοι), was a coastal town in ancient Paphlagonia, mentioned by Homer in the Iliad as an ally of Troy during the Trojan War. Strabo fixed the position of the town upon two rocks, called, from their colour, Ἐρυθρῖνοι, 90 stadia east of Amastris, and 60 stadia north of Cromna. Arrian writes that the Amastris is 60 stadia from the Erythini.

Its site is located near Çakraz, Asiatic Turkey.
