= Kemere Bridge =

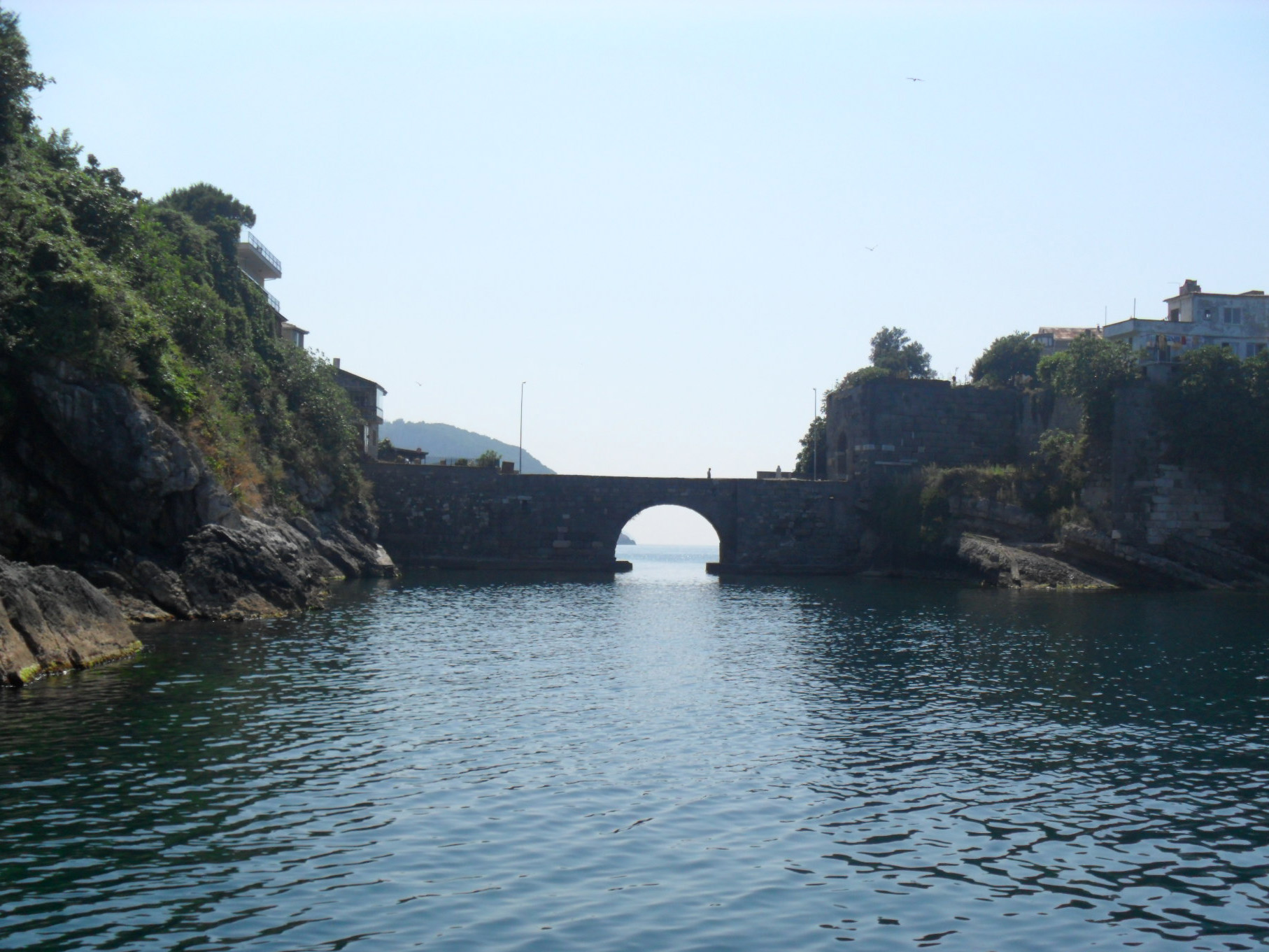
- Kemere Bridge in Amasra
- Coordinates: 41°45′01″N 32°23′05″E
- Crosses: Black Sea

Characteristics
- Material: Stone arches
- No. of spans: 1

History
- Construction end: 9th century

Statistics
- Toll: free

Kemere Bridge (Turkish: Kemere Köprüsü) is a historical bridge in Turkey.

The bridge is in Amasra ilçe (district) of Bartın Province at 41°45′01″N 32°23′05″E. It is over a Black Sea channel connecting two neighborhoods of Amasra. It is between Anatolia mainland and Boztepe Island. The bridge was constructed in the 9th century, i.e., during the Byzantine Empire era probably together with the Amasra Castle.

Kemere is a one-arch bridge. Up until recently, the bridge was over a pebble embankment area. After dredging, now the channel has been opened to sea traffic. The width of the sea channel between the mainland and the island is only about 35 metres (115 ft). Currently the abutment of the bridge is being repaired by the governorate of Bartın.
