= Topallar =

Topallar may refer to:

- Topallar, Amasra, village in Bartın Province, Turkey
- Topallar, Musabeyli, village in Kilis Province, Turkey
