= Mokata =

Populated place in ancient Paphlagonia

Coordinates: 41°36′47″N 32°10′13″E

Mokata was an inland town of ancient Paphlagonia inhabited during the Hellenistic period. Its name does not occur in ancient authors, but is inferred from epigraphic and other evidence.

Its site is located near Muda in Asiatic Turkey.
