= Endeira =

Town in the borderlands between ancient Bithynia and Paphlagonia

Coordinates: 40°58′04″N 32°38′19″E

Endeira was a town in the borderlands between ancient Bithynia and Paphlagonia, inhabited in Roman times. The name does not occur among ancient authors but is inferred from epigraphic and other evidence.

Its site is located near Emrodere, Asiatic Turkey.
