= Kalaycı =

Kalaycı may refer to:

== People ==
- Barış Kalaycı (born 2005), Turkish footballer
- Dilek Kalayci (born 1967), Turkish politician
- Selim Kalaycı (born 2000), Turkish volleyball player

== Places ==
- Kalaycı, Amasra, town in Bartın Province, Turkey
- Kalaycı, Mazgirt, town in Tunceli Province, Turkey
