= Paphlagonian Eneti =

Ancient people of Asia Minor

The Eneti (Ancient Greek: Ἐνετοί, Enetoí; Latin: Eneti, Heneti, Enetae) were a people that inhabited parts of Paphlagonia and the surrounding areas in antiquity.

They are mentioned by Homer and Strabo.

Homer says that the Enetoí lived on the southern coast of the Black Sea in northern Paphlagonia at the time of the Trojan War (c. 1200 BC). He particularly notes that in their lands "the mules run wild in herds". Pylaemenes of the Enetae led the Paphlagonians who came to Troy's aid. Their combined territory is said to hold "Cytorus and the country round Sesamus, with the cities by the river Parthenius, Cromna, Aegialus, and lofty Erithini". Pylaemenes and his son Harpalion were both killed during the war.

Strabo notes that the scholars of his own time were confused by the supposed identity of the Enetoí with none present in Paphlagonia. He reports that the most common belief was that—after losing their leaders in battle—they had crossed into Thrace after the Trojan War. Zenodotus considered Homer to "clearly" be talking about Amisus. Others said the Eneti had bordered the Cappadocians and, after a failed expedition against the Cimmerians, were driven to the Adriatic Sea. Still others claimed that Antenor and his children particularly fled there. (Both theories conflated the Eneti with the Adriatic Veneti, whose name was similar in Greek transcription but whose language and artifacts bear no obvious connection to ancient Anatolia.) Strabo further reports that one village is identified as the Enetoí at a location on the Aegialus 10 schoeni from Amastris.

== See also ==
- Paphlagonia
