= Kocaköy, Amasra =

Kocaköy
- Village
- Location within Turkey
- Coordinates: 41.6941°N 32.4788°E
- Country: Turkey
- Province: Bartın
- District: Amasra
- Population (2021): 511
- Time zone: UTC+3 (TRT)

Kocaköy is a village in the Amasra District, Bartın Province, Turkey. Its population is 511 (2021).

== Geography ==
The village is 19 km from Bartın city center and 18 km from Amasra town centre.
