= Yahyayazıcılar, Amasra =

Yahyayazıcılar
- Village
- Location within Turkey
- Country: Turkey
- Province: Bartın
- District: Amasra
- Population (2021): 267
- Time zone: UTC+3 (TRT)

Yahyayazıcılar is a village in the Amasra District, Bartın Province, Turkey. Its population is 267 (2021).

== Geography ==
The village is 36 km from Bartın city center and 21 km from Amasra town centre.
