= Hattat Holding =

Turkish holding company

- Website: www.hattat.com.tr

Hattat Holding is a holding company headquartered in Turkey with companies in coal mining, construction, and engine assembly.

It is making Amasra B coal mine which was formerly intended to supply a power plant, but the power plant was rejected (different from Amasra coal mine) which they claim will be one of the largest hard coal mines in the country, with help from a Chinese group and is on the Urgewald global coal exit list.
