= Kazpınarı, Amasra =

Kazpınarı
- Village
- Location within Turkey
- Coordinates: 41°42′N 32°22′E
- Country: Turkey
- Province: Bartın
- District: Amasra
- Population (2021): 523
- Time zone: UTC+3 (TRT)

Kazpınarı is a village in the Amasra District, Bartın Province, Turkey. Its population is 523 (2021).

== Geography ==
The village is 8 km from Bartın city center and 7 km from Amasra town centre.
