= Gömü, Amasra =

Gömü
- Village
- Location in Turkey
- Coordinates: 41.7305°N 32.3598°E
- Country: Turkey
- Province: Bartın
- District: Amasra
- Population (2021): 457
- Time zone: UTC+3 (TRT)

Gömü is a village in the Amasra District, Bartın Province, Turkey. Its population is 457 (2021).

== Geography ==
The village is 13 km from Bartın city center and 4 km from Amasra town centre. Kuşkayası Monument is located near the village.
