= Göçkündemirci, Amasra =

Göçkündemirci
- Village
- Location within Turkey
- Country: Turkey
- Province: Bartın
- District: Amasra
- Population (2021): 228
- Time zone: UTC+3 (TRT)

Göçkündemirci is a village in the Amasra District, Bartın Province, Turkey. Its population is 228 (2021).

== History ==
The name of the village was mentioned as Göçkün Demirciler in the records of 1928.

== Geography ==
The village is 36 km from Bartın city center and 20 km from Amasra town centre.
