= Karakaçak, Amasra =

Karakaçak
- Village
- Location within Turkey
- Coordinates: 41°46′N 32°29′E
- Country: Turkey
- Province: Bartın
- District: Amasra
- Population (2021): 278
- Time zone: UTC+3 (TRT)

Karakaçak is a village in the Amasra District, Bartın Province, Turkey. Its population is 278 (2021).

== Geography ==
The village is 29 km from Bartın city center and 14 km from Amasra town centre.
