= Çakrazboz, Amasra =

Çakrazboz
- Village
- Location within Turkey
- Coordinates: 41.7705°N 32.4649°E
- Country: Turkey
- Province: Bartın
- District: Amasra
- Population (2021): 154
- Time zone: UTC+3 (TRT)

Çakrazboz is a village in the Amasra District, Bartın Province, Turkey. Its population is 154 (2021).

== History ==
The name of the village was mentioned as Bozköy in 1907 and as Çakraz Bozköy in 1928.

== Geography ==
The village is 27 km from Bartın city center and 12 km from Amasra town centre.
