= Amasra District =

District of Bartın Province, Turkey

- District
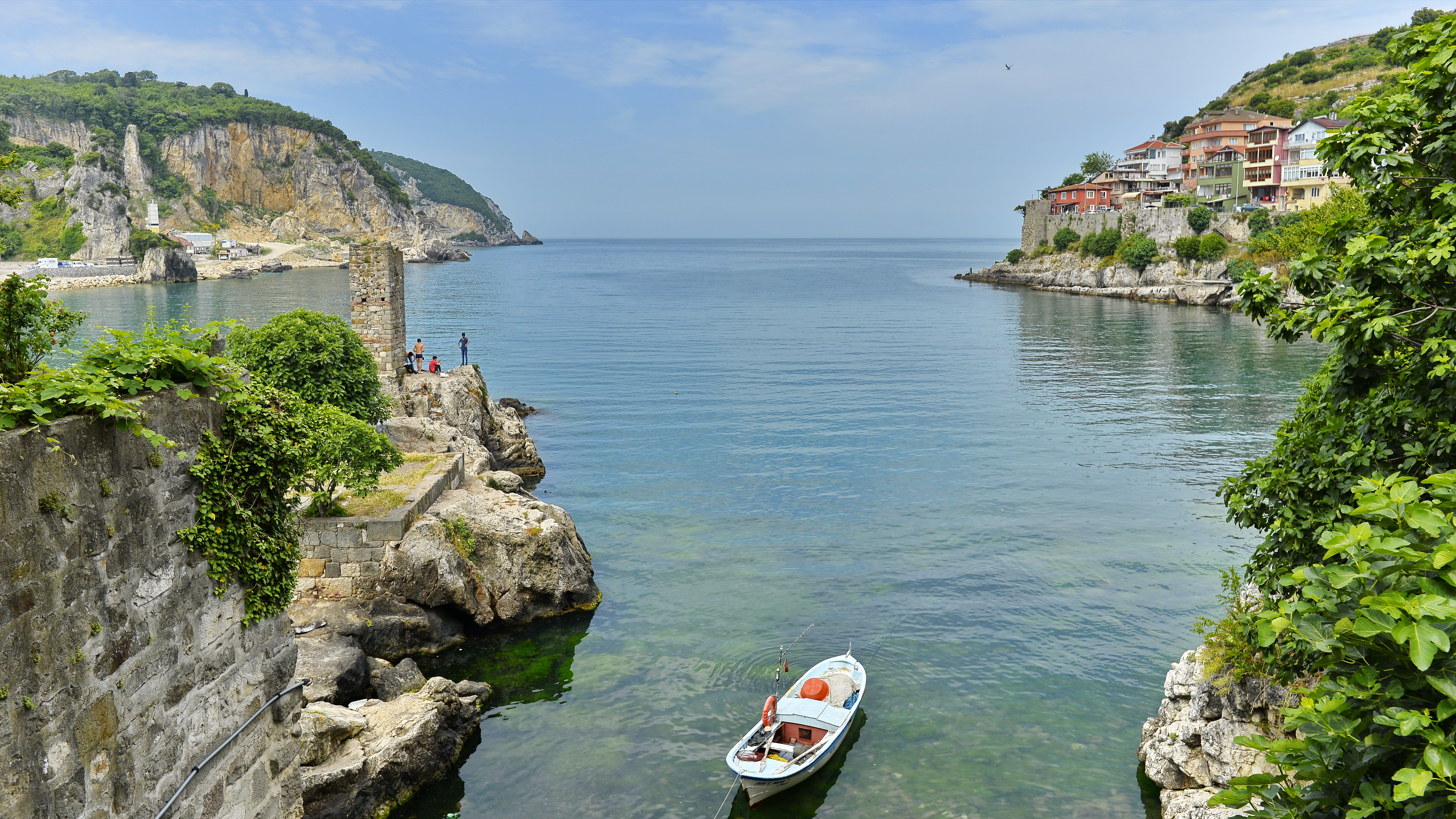
- Gulf of Amasra

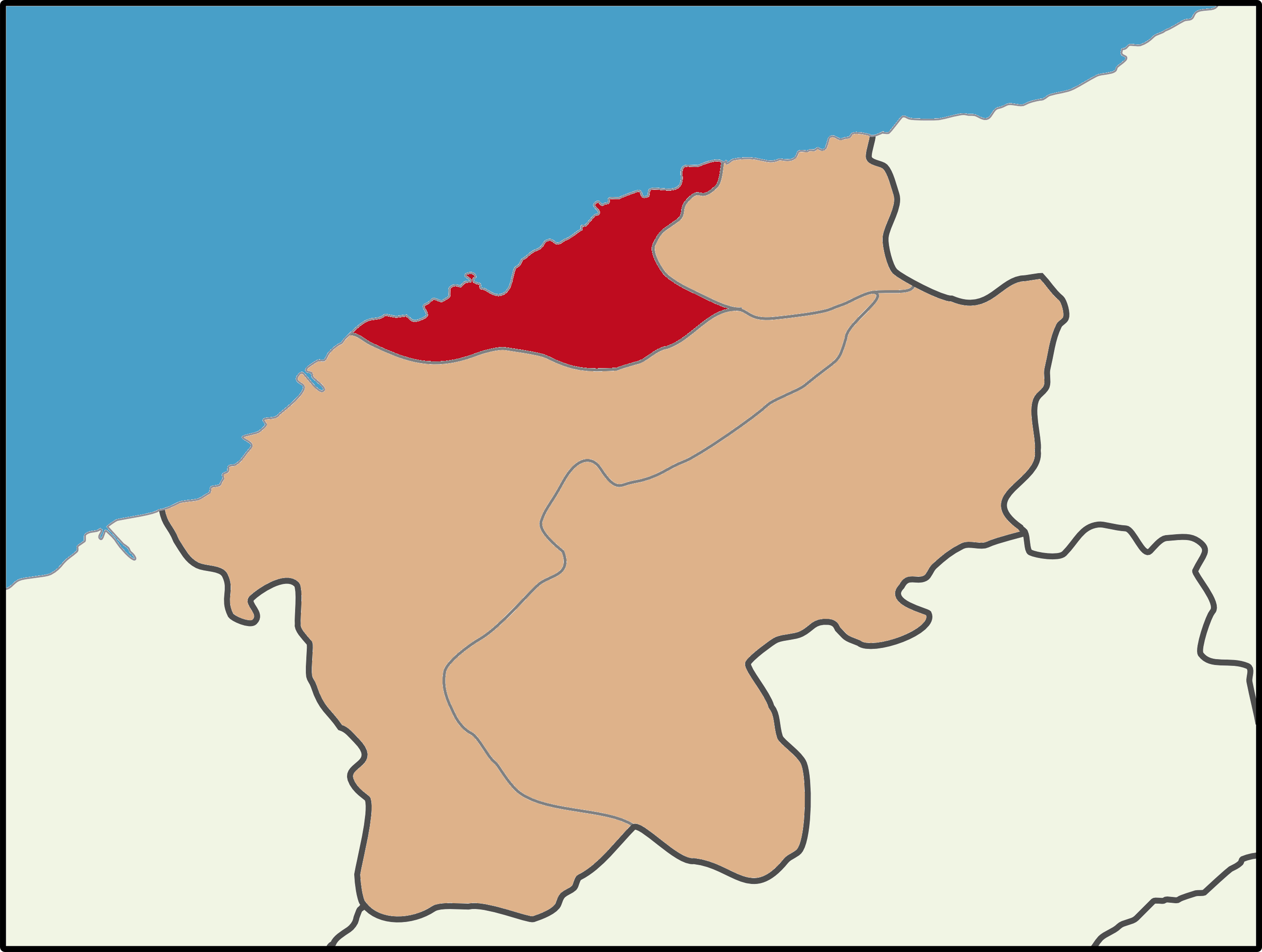
- Map showing Amasra District in Bartın Province

- Location within Turkey
- Coordinates: 41°44′N 32°23′E
- Country: Turkey
- Province: Bartın
- Seat: Amasra

Government
  - Kaymakam: Kadir Perçi
- Area: 178 km^{2} (69 sq mi)
- Population (2021): 14,086
  - Density: 79.1/km^{2} (205/sq mi)
- Time zone: UTC+3 (TRT)
- Website: www.amasra.gov.tr

Amasra District is a district of Bartın Province of Turkey. Its seat is the town Amasra. Its area is 178 km^{2}, and its population is 14,086 (2021).

== Composition ==
There is one municipality in Amasra District:

- Amasra

There are 30 villages in Amasra District:

- Acarlar
- Ahatlar
- Akkonak
- Aliobası
- Bostanlar
- Çakrazboz
- Çakrazova
- Çakrazşeyhler
- Çanakçılar
- Cumayanı
- Esenler
- Göçkün
- Göçkündemirci
- Gömü
- Hatipler
- İnciğez
- İnpiri
- Kalaycı
- Karakaçak
- Kazpınarı
- Kocaköy
- Makaracı
- Saraydüzü
- Şenyurt
- Şükürler
- Tarlaağzı
- Topallar
- Topderesi
- Yahyayazıcılar
- Yukarısal
