= Hatipler, Amasra =

Hatipler
- Village
- Location within Turkey
- Coordinates: 41.7754°N 32.4920°E
- Country: Turkey
- Province: Bartın
- District: Amasra
- Population (2021): 80
- Time zone: UTC+3 (TRT)

Hatipler is a village in the Amasra District, Bartın Province, Turkey. Its population is 80 (2021).

== History ==
The village was mentioned as Hatib in 1927.

== Geography ==
The village is 29 km from Bartın city center and 14 km from Amasra town centre.
