= İnpiri, Amasra =

İnpiri
- Village
- Location within Turkey
- Coordinates: 41.7439°N 32.4408°E
- Country: Turkey
- Province: Bartın
- District: Amasra
- Population (2021): 179
- Time zone: UTC+3 (TRT)

İnpiri is a village in the Amasra District, Bartın Province, Turkey. Its population is 179 (2021).

== History ==
The name of the village was mentioned as İnköy in 1907. The village has the name İnpiri since 1928.

== Geography ==
The village is 21 km from Bartın city center and 6 km from Amasra town centre.
