= Callistratia =

Town on the Black Sea coast of ancient Paphlagonia

Coordinates: 42°00′11″N 33°24′20″E

Callistratia or Kallistratia (Ancient Greek: Καλλιστρατία) was a town on the Black Sea coast of ancient Paphlagonia, at a distance of 20 stadia east of Cape Carambis (modern Kerempe Burnu). It was also called Marsilla or Marsylla, according to the anonymous Periplus.

Its site is tentatively located near Kışla in Asiatic Turkey.
