= İnciğez, Amasra =

İnciğez
- Village
- Location within Turkey
- Coordinates: 41.7052°N 32.4858°E
- Country: Turkey
- Province: Bartın
- District: Amasra
- Population (2021): 285
- Time zone: UTC+3 (TRT)

İnciğez is a village in the Amasra District, Bartın Province, Turkey. Its population is 285 (2021).

== History ==
The village was mentioned as İnceğiz in 1928.

== Geography ==
The village is 21 km from Bartın city center and 15 km from Amasra town centre.
