= Aliobası, Amasra =

Aliobası
- Village
- Location within Turkey
- Coordinates: 41°46′N 32°31′E
- Country: Turkey
- Province: Bartın
- District: Amasra
- Population (2021): 286
- Time zone: UTC+3 (TRT)

Aliobası is a village in the Amasra District, Bartın Province, Turkey. Its population is 286 (2021).

== History ==
The name of the village was mentioned as Alabas in 1907.

== Geography ==
The village is 33 km from Bartın city and 17 km from Amasra town.
