= Göçkün, Amasra =

Göçkün
- Village
- Location within Turkey
- Country: Turkey
- Province: Bartın
- District: Amasra
- Population (2021): 139
- Time zone: UTC+3 (TRT)

Göçkün is a village in the Amasra District, Bartın Province, Turkey. Its population is 139 (2021).

== History ==
The name of the village is mentioned as Göçkün in the records of 1928 and as Göçkünşili in the records of 1946.

== Geography ==
The village is 36 km from Bartın city center and 20 km from Amasra town centre.
