= Ahatlar, Amasra =

Ahatlar
- Village
- Location within Turkey
- Coordinates: 41.7354°N 32.4229°E
- Country: Turkey
- Province: Bartın
- District: Amasra
- Population (2021): 318
- Time zone: UTC+3 (TRT)

Ahatlar is a village in the Amasra District, Bartın Province, Turkey. Its population is 318 (2021).

== History ==
The name of the village was mentioned as Ahatköy in 1907.

== Geography ==
The village is 19 km from Bartın city center and 4 km from Amasra town centre.
