= Makaracı, Amasra =

Makaracı
- Village
- Location within Turkey
- Coordinates: 41°44′N 32°27′E
- Country: Turkey
- Province: Bartın
- District: Amasra
- Population (2021): 507
- Time zone: UTC+3 (TRT)

Makaracı is a village in the Amasra District, Bartın Province, Turkey. Its population is 507 (2021).

== Geography ==
The village is 24 km from Bartın city center and 8 km from Amasra town centre. Gürcüoluk Cave is located near the village.
