= Esenler, Amasra =

Esenler
- Village
- Country: Turkey
- Province: Bartın
- District: Amasra
- Population (2021): 194
- Time zone: UTC+3 (TRT)

Esenler is a village in the Amasra District, Bartın Province, Turkey. Its population is 194 (2021).

== Geography ==
The village is 38 km from Bartın city center and 22 km from Amasra town centre.
