= Topderesi, Amasra =

Topderesi
- Village
- Location in Turkey
- Coordinates: 41°43′N 32°24′E
- Country: Turkey
- Province: Bartın
- District: Amasra
- Population (2021): 183
- Time zone: UTC+3 (TRT)

Topderesi is a village in the Amasra District, Bartın Province, Turkey. Its population is 183 (2021).

== Geography ==
The village is 11 km from Bartın city center and 11 km from Amasra town center.
