= Saraydüzü, Amasra =

Saraydüzü
- Village
- Location within Turkey
- Coordinates: 41.6952°N 32.4392°E
- Country: Turkey
- Province: Bartın
- District: Amasra
- Population (2021): 422
- Time zone: UTC+3 (TRT)

Saraydüzü is a village in the Amasra District, Bartın Province, Turkey. Its population is 422 (2021).

== Geography ==
The village is 13 km from Bartın city center and 10 km from Amasra town centre.
