= Çakrazova, Amasra =

Çakrazova
- Village
- Location within Turkey
- Coordinates: 41°47′N 32°30′E
- Country: Turkey
- Province: Bartın
- District: Amasra
- Population (2021): 160
- Time zone: UTC+3 (TRT)

Çakrazova is a village in the Amasra District, Bartın Province, Turkey. Its population is 160 (2021).

== history ==
The village was mentioned as Çakraz Ova in 1928. It was a Caucasian and Laz settlement at the beginning of the 20th century.
