= Yukarısal, Amasra =

Yukarısal
- Village
- Location within Turkey
- Coordinates: 41°44′N 32°33′E
- Country: Turkey
- Province: Bartın
- District: Amasra
- Population (2021): 307
- Time zone: UTC+3 (TRT)

Yukarısal is a village in the Amasra District of the Bartın Province in Turkey. Its population was 307 as of 2021.

== Geography ==
The village is 35 km from the Bartın city center and 20 km from the Amasra town centre.
