= Akkonak, Amasra =

Akkonak
- Village
- Location within Turkey
- Coordinates: 41.7958°N 32.5102°E
- Country: Turkey
- Province: Bartın
- District: Amasra
- Population (2021): 140
- Time zone: UTC+3 (TRT)

Akkonak is a village in the Amasra District, Bartın Province, Turkey. Its population is 140 (2021).

== Geography ==
The village is 30 km from Bartın city center and 18 km from Amasra town centre.
