= Çanakçılar, Amasra =

Çanakçılar
- Village
- Location within Turkey
- Coordinates: 41.7103°N 32.4983°E
- Country: Turkey
- Province: Bartın
- District: Amasra
- Population (2021): 458
- Time zone: UTC+3 (TRT)

Çanakçılar is a village in the Amasra District, Bartın Province, Turkey. Its population is 458 (2021).

== Geography ==
The village is 55 km from Bartın city center and 26 km from Amasra town centre.
