= Şenyurt, Amasra =

Şenyurt
- Village
- Location within Turkey
- Coordinates: 41°46′14″N 32°29′21″E
- Country: Turkey
- Province: Bartın
- District: Amasra
- Population (2021): 216
- Time zone: UTC+3 (TRT)

Şenyurt is a village in the Amasra District, Bartın Province, Turkey. Its population is 216 (2021).

== History ==
The name of the village was mentioned as Zurnacı in the records of 1928.

== Geography ==
The village is 30 km from Bartın city center and 15 km from Amasra town centre.
