= Şükürler, Amasra =

Şükürler
- Village
- Location within Turkey
- Coordinates: 41.7139°N 32.5337°E
- Country: Turkey
- Province: Bartın
- District: Amasra
- Population (2021): 386
- Time zone: UTC+3 (TRT)

Şükürler is a village in the Amasra District, Bartın Province, Turkey. Its population is 386 (2021).

== Geography ==
The village is 24 km from Bartın city center and 19 km from Amasra town centre.
