= Acarlar, Amasra =

Acarlar
- Village
- Location in Turkey
- Coordinates: 41.7716°N 32.5667°E
- Country: Turkey
- Province: Bartın
- District: Amasra
- Population (2021): 138
- Time zone: UTC+3 (TRT)

Acarlar is a village in the Amasra District, Bartın Province, Turkey. Its population is 138 (2021).

The village is 38 km from Bartın city center and 23 km from Amasra district center.
