= Çakrazşeyhler, Amasra =

Çakrazşeyhler
- Village
- Location within Turkey
- Coordinates: 41°47′N 32°29′E
- Country: Turkey
- Province: Bartın
- District: Amasra
- Population (2021): 332
- Time zone: UTC+3 (TRT)

Çakrazşeyhler or Çakraz is a village in Amasra District, Bartın Province, Turkey. Its population is 332 (2021).

== History ==
The village was mentioned as Çakraz Şeyxler in 1928.

== Geography ==
The village is 28 km from Bartın city center and 13 km from Amasra town centre.

== See also ==
- Erythini
