= Topallar, Amasra =

Topallar
- Village
- Location within Turkey
- Country: Turkey
- Province: Bartın
- District: Amasra
- Population (2021): 64
- Time zone: UTC+3 (TRT)

Topallar is a village in the Amasra District, Bartın Province, Turkey. Its population is 64 (2021).
