= Pylaemenes =

Characters of Greek mythology

In Greek mythology, Pylaemenes (Ancient Greek: Πυλαιμένης) may refer to two distinct characters:

- Pylaemenes, king of the Eneti tribe of Paphlagonia. He claimed to be related to Priam through Phineus (also a reputed king of Paphlagonia) as the latter's daughter Olizone was married to Dardanus. Pylaemenes led his Paphlagonian forces to the Trojan War, as a Trojan ally. He was killed in battle by Menelaus of Sparta. However, when his son Harpalion was killed by the Cretan warrior Meriones, son of Molus, the father of Harpalion is said to have been left weeping, suggesting Pylaemenes' survival. Porphyry comments that the wording of Iliad 5.576 may mean that he was wounded or captured instead of being killed. Homer provided no parentage for Pylaemenes, but other mythographers named his father as Bilsates or Melius.
- Pylaemenes, one of the Suitors of Penelope who came from Dulichium along with other 56 wooers. He, with the other suitors, was shot dead by Odysseus with the help of Eumaeus, Philoetius, and Telemachus.
