= Kalaycı, Amasra =

Kalaycı
- Village
- Location within Turkey
- Coordinates: 41°47′8″N 32°32′26″E
- Country: Turkey
- Province: Bartın
- District: Amasra
- Population (2021): 167
- Time zone: UTC+3 (TRT)

Kalaycı is a village in the Amasra District, Bartın Province, Turkey. Its population is 167 (2021).

== Geography ==
The village is 35 km from Bartın city and 20 km from Amasra town.
