= Amasra Fortress =

Fortress in Amasra, Bartın, Turkey

Coordinates: 41.7504°N 32.3846°E

Amasra Fortress or Amasra Castle is located in the Amasra district of Bartın, on the Black Sea coast of Turkey. It was built by the Romans and later restored by the Byzantines, Genoese and Ottomans. It consists of two parts: Sormagir Castle and Zindan Castle. It was added to the Tentative List of World Heritage Sites by UNESCO in 2020.

Amasra Fortress consists of two main masses which are connected by a bridge called the Boztepe Arch. The fortress was used extensively during the Genoese period and had serious repairs done in the 14th and 15th centuries. The length of the eastern walls of the fortress between the northeast and southeast is 65 meters, the length of the southern walls with 8 bastions is 300 meters, and the length of the northern walls from the Kemere Bridge, most of which have been destroyed, is 200 meters.

Since the north and northwest of Sormagir Castle descend into the sea in a very steep cliff, no walls were built here. Most of the walls surrounding the east, northeast and west have been destroyed, and a 50-meter part of the west walls adjacent to the gate is still standing. There are tower gaps, interior divisions, and coats of arms of the Genoese placed in certain places on the walls. Figures such as Eros, Medusa, an eagle, and ox head are also still preserved.

== Gallery ==
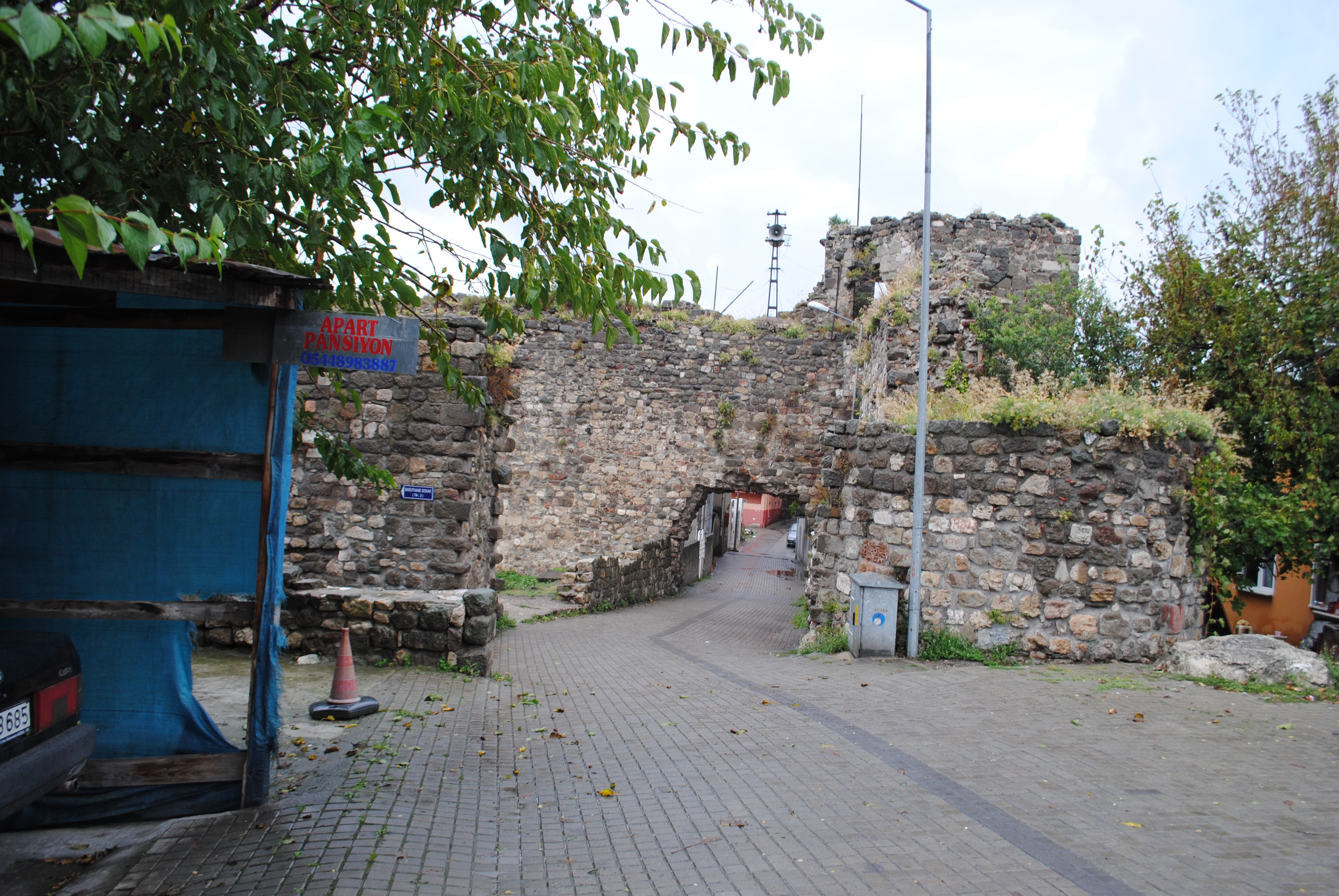

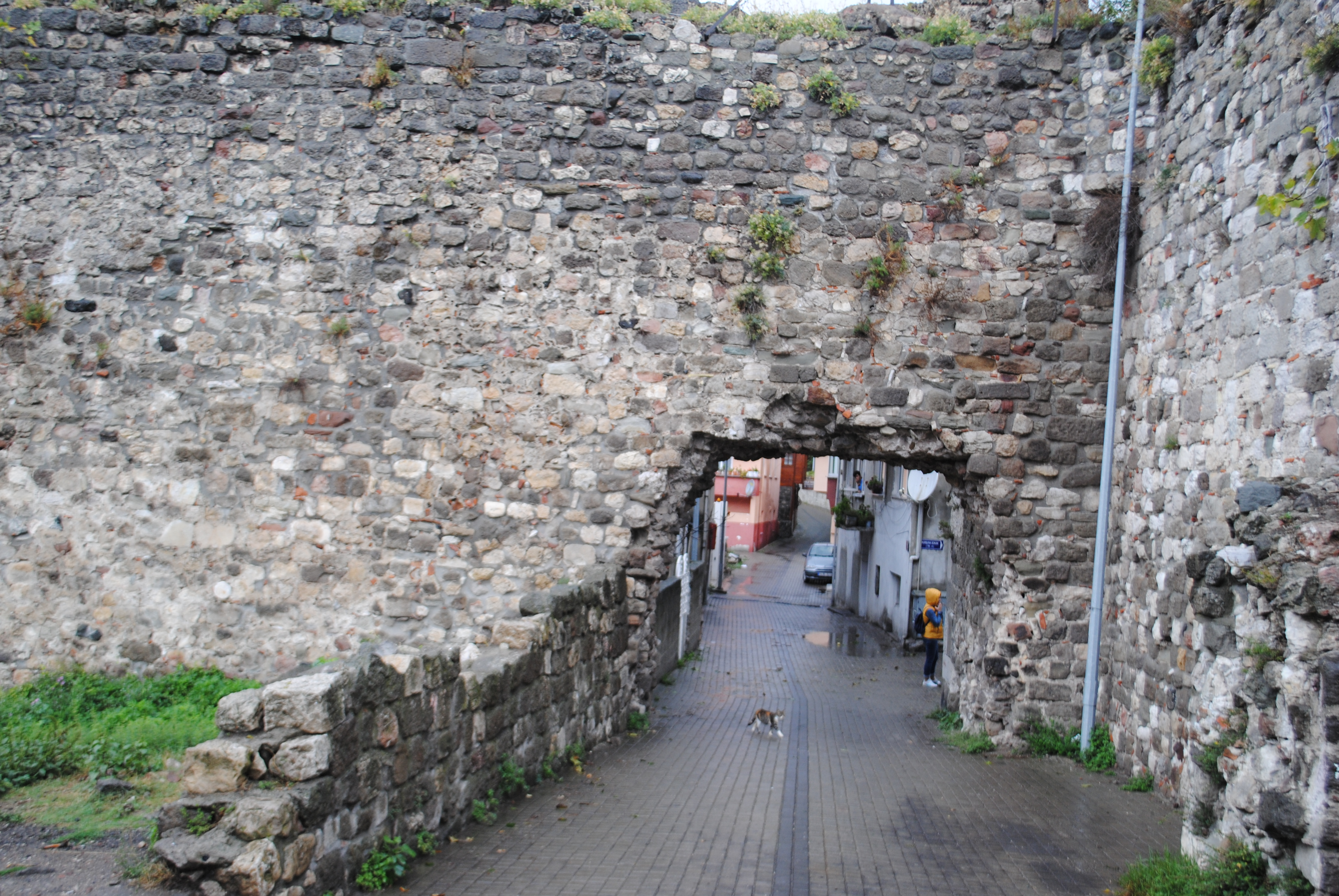

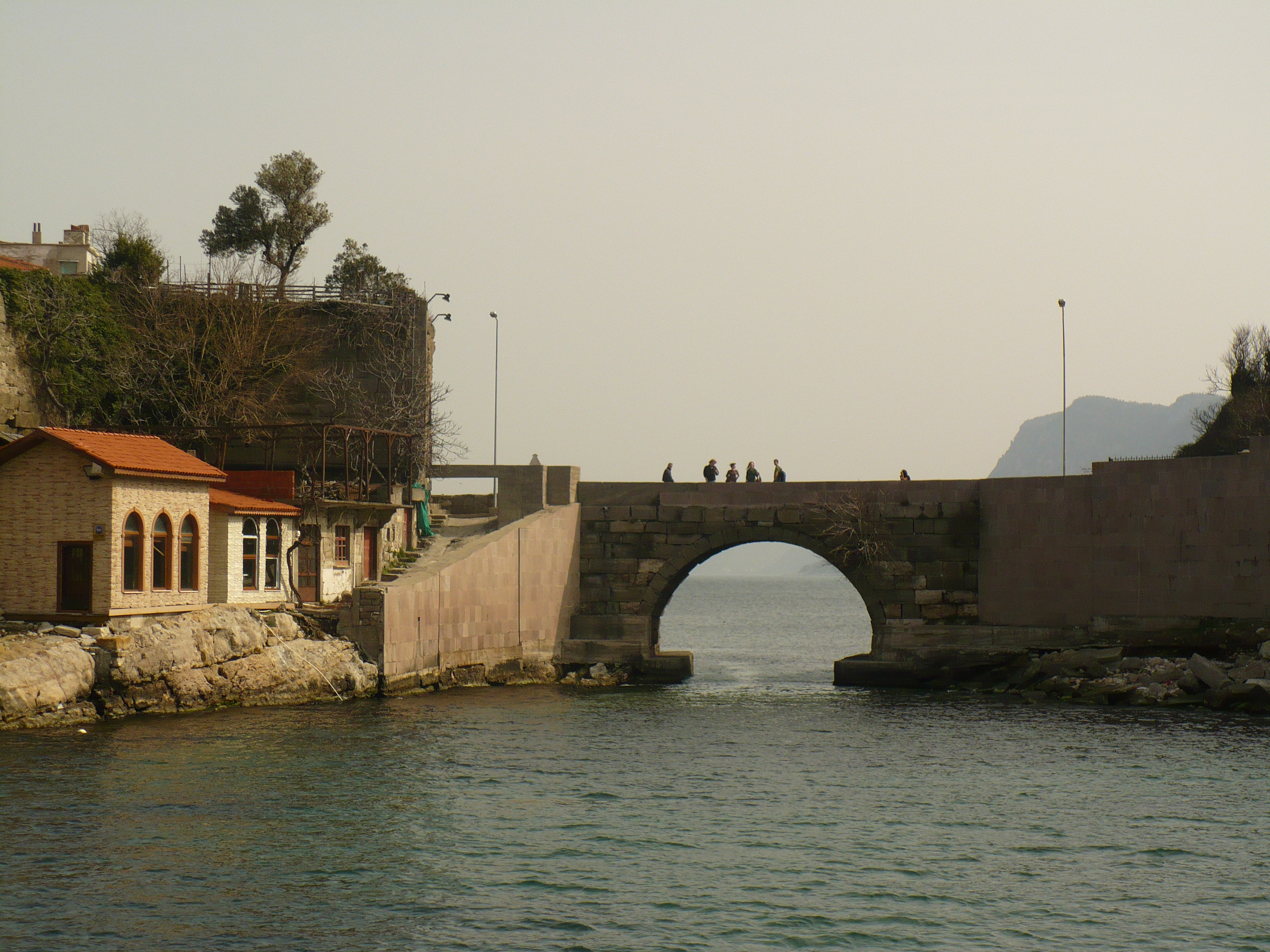
Kemere Bridge

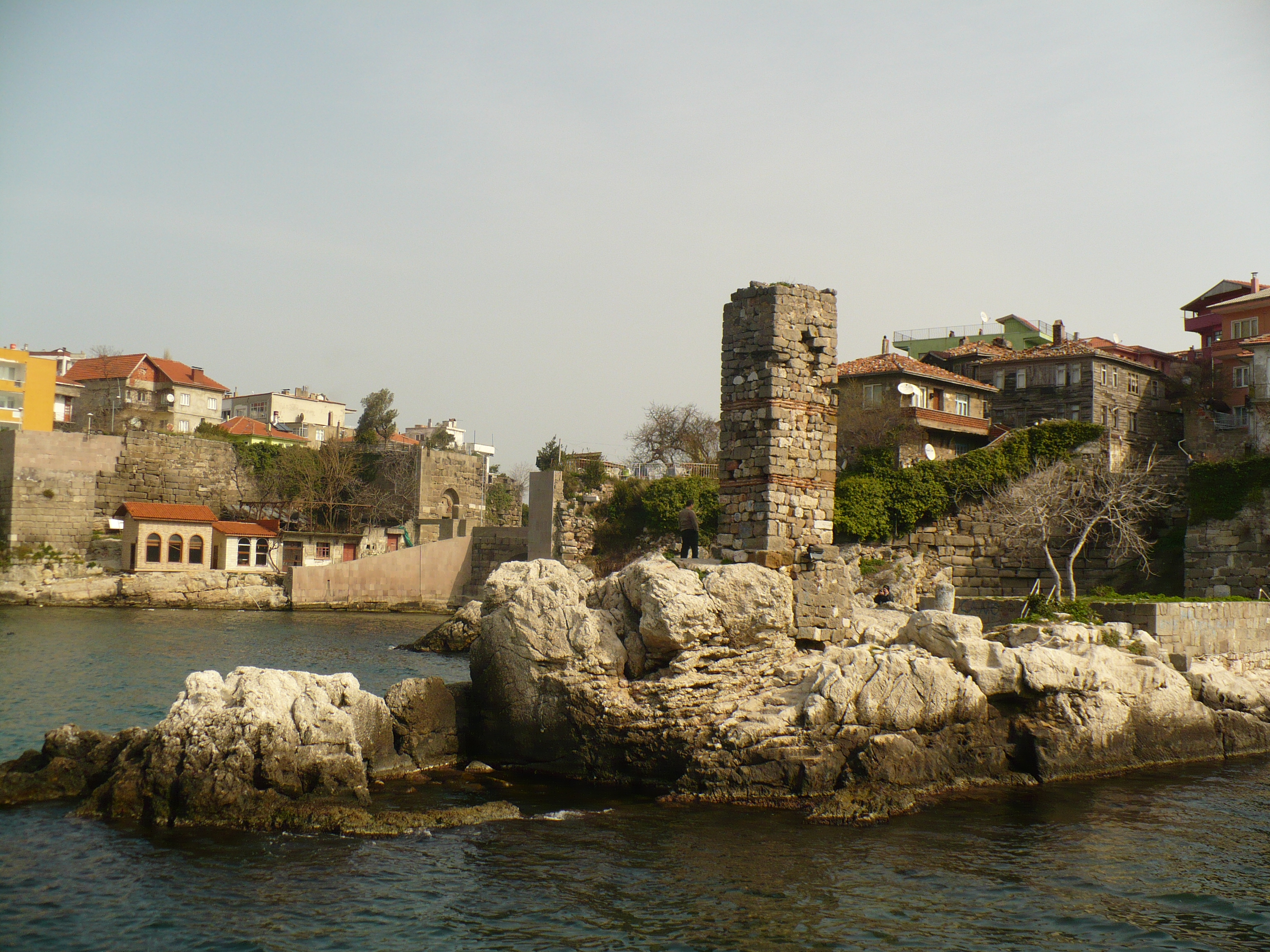
Fortress gate

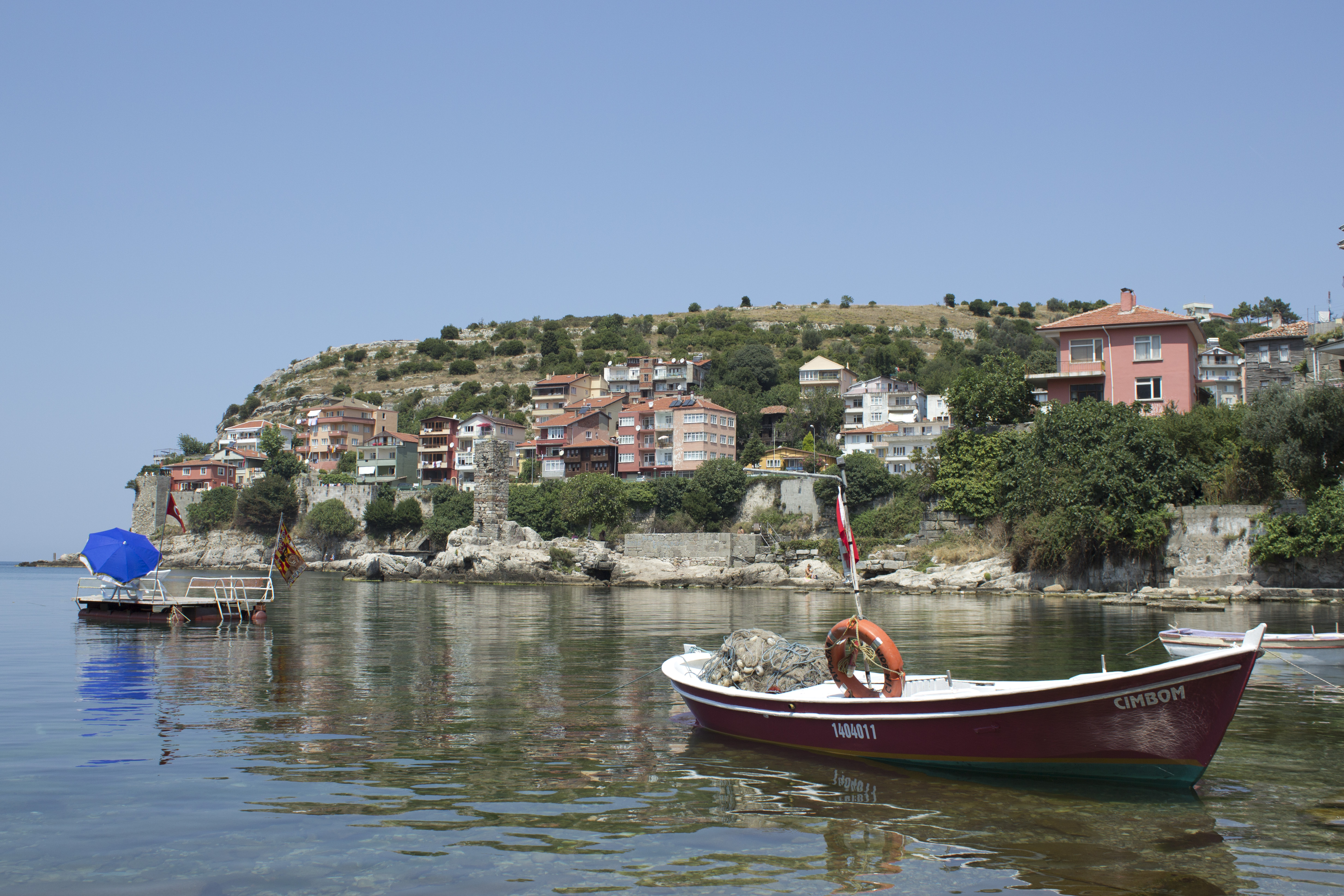

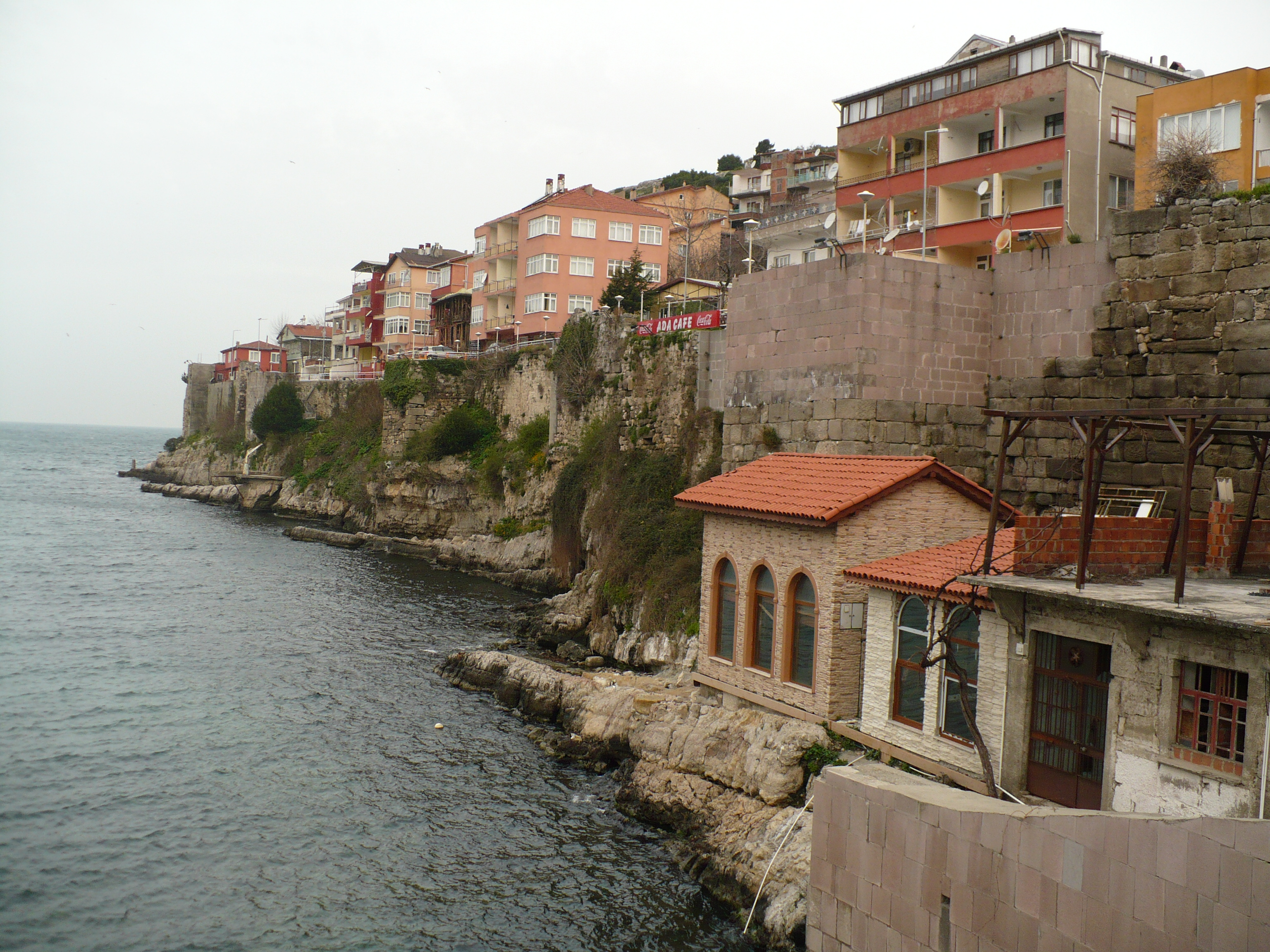
