= Kuşkayası Monument =

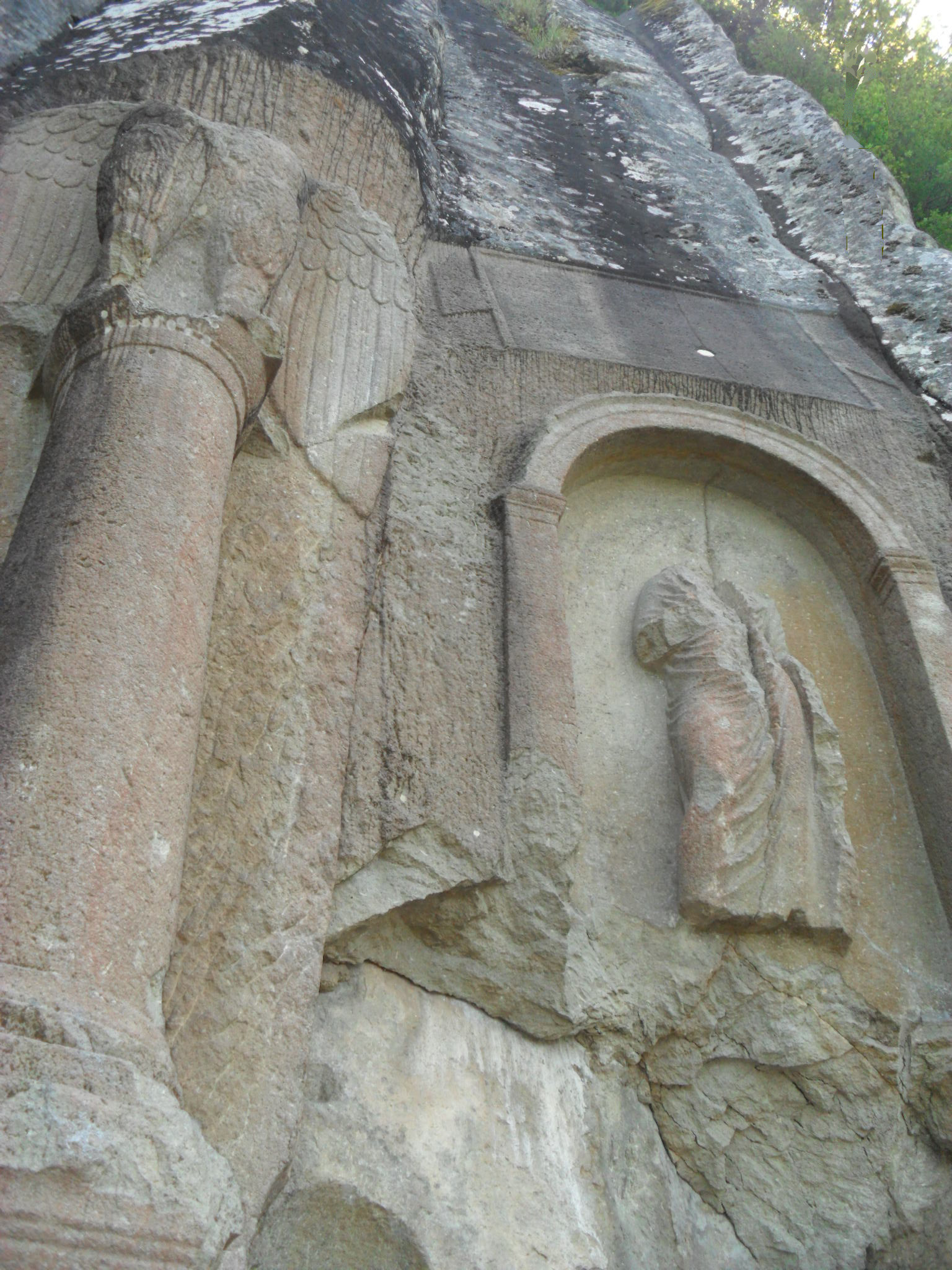
Close up of the monument

Kuşkayası (Turkish for Bird's rock) is a roadside monument just outside the town of Amasra, in Bartın Province, in the Black Sea Region of Turkey. It was erected in the Roman Imperial age.

== Location ==
The landmark lies in a dense forest, situated to the south of the D.010 road connecting Amasra to Bartın at 41°43′06″N 32°21′49″E. At a distance of about 4 km (2.5 mi) from Amasra, it overlooks a part of the town as well as the Black Sea. The altitude of the monument is about 350 m (1,150 ft) above sea level. It can be reached by a staircase from the road.

== History ==
The Kuşkayası road monument is a unique structure in Turkey. It was built by Gaius Julius Aquila, procurator of Bithynia et Pontus, in honor of Roman Emperor Tiberius Claudius Germanicus (AD 41–54). The monument includes a statue of a now headless human figure, the Roman eagle (also headless) and a bilingual inscription, all carved into the mountain. The 260 cm (100 in) human figure may represent either the Emperor or the Governor. In the original monument there was also a fountain (which no longer exists).

== Inscription ==
The inscription is in Latin and Greek translations, which allow lacunae in one to be supplemented by the surviving text of the other.

For the Augustan peace, in honor of Emperor Tiberius Claudius Germanicus, perpetual priest of the deified Augustus. Gaius Julius Aquila, twice prefectus fabrum with recommendations, in the consulships of Aulus Gabinius Secundus and Titus Statilius Taurus, penetrated the mountain and built the road and recreation ground with his own wealth.
