= Bartın River =

River in Turkey

Coordinates: 41°41′N 32°15′E

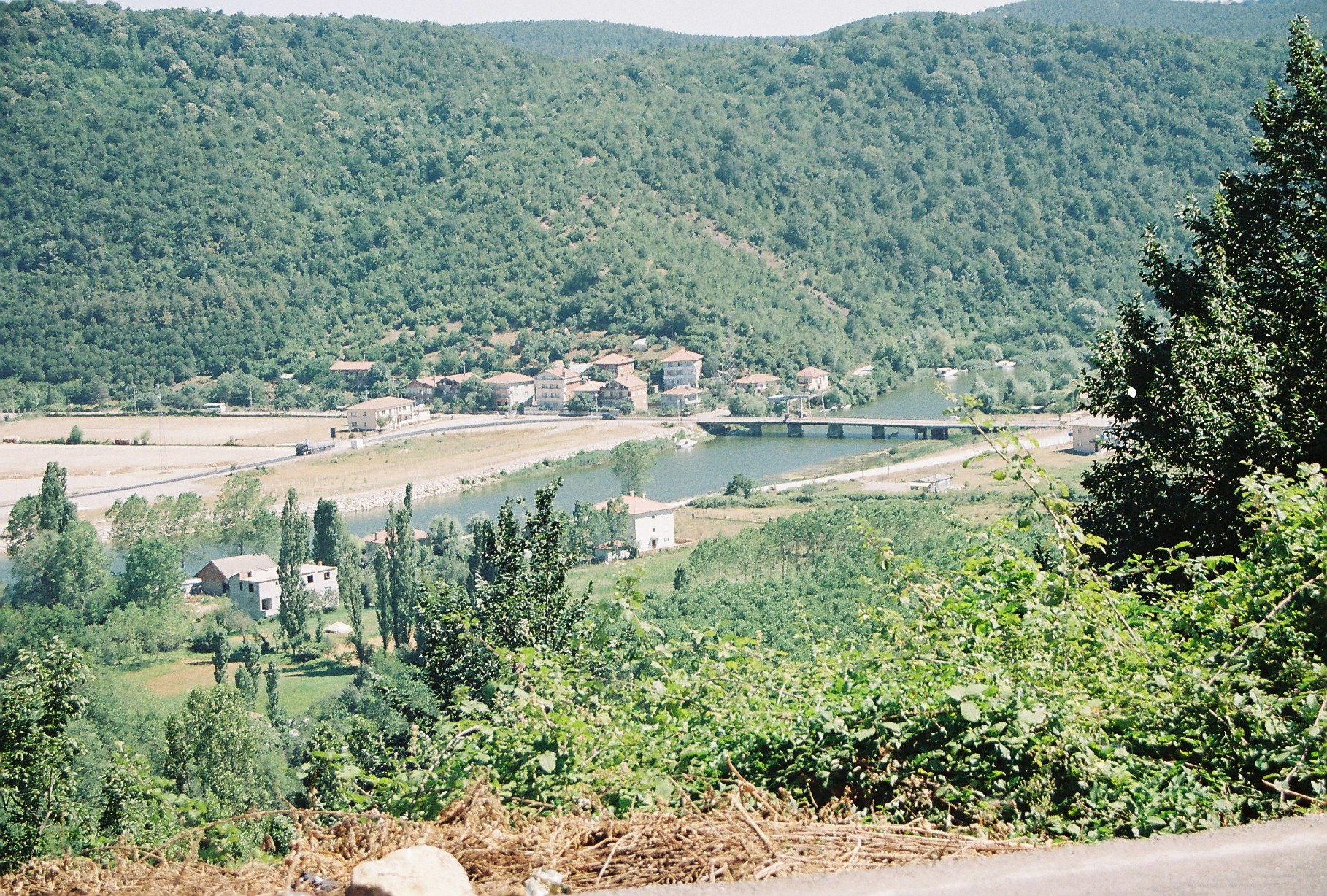
Bartın River, near the Black Sea

Bartın River (Bartın Çayı), anciently known as Parthenius or Parthenios (Ancient Greek: Παρθένιος), is a small river in the west of the Black Sea Region of Turkey. Its source is in the Ilgaz Mountains, in Kastamonu Province and Karabük Province. The river flows to the north, passes through Bartın, and empties into the Black Sea near Boğaz village in a delta.

The last 14 kilometres (9 mi) on the Bartın River, between Bartın and the Black Sea coast, are navigable for vessels.

The Greek name is ancient, as the river is mentioned by Homer in the Iliad. Because the ancient name sounds like Parthen- (Παρθέν-, ancient Greek for 'virgin' or 'purity'), ancient Greek authors fabled that it derived its name from the fact that Artemis, patron goddess of virgins, loved to bathe in its waters or to hunt on its banks, or from the purity of its waters. The river has its sources on Mount Olgassys, and in its northwestern course formed the boundary between Paphlagonia and Bithynia. It empties itself into the Black Sea about 15 km west of Amasra.
