= Amasra =

Small Black Sea port town in Turkey

- Municipality
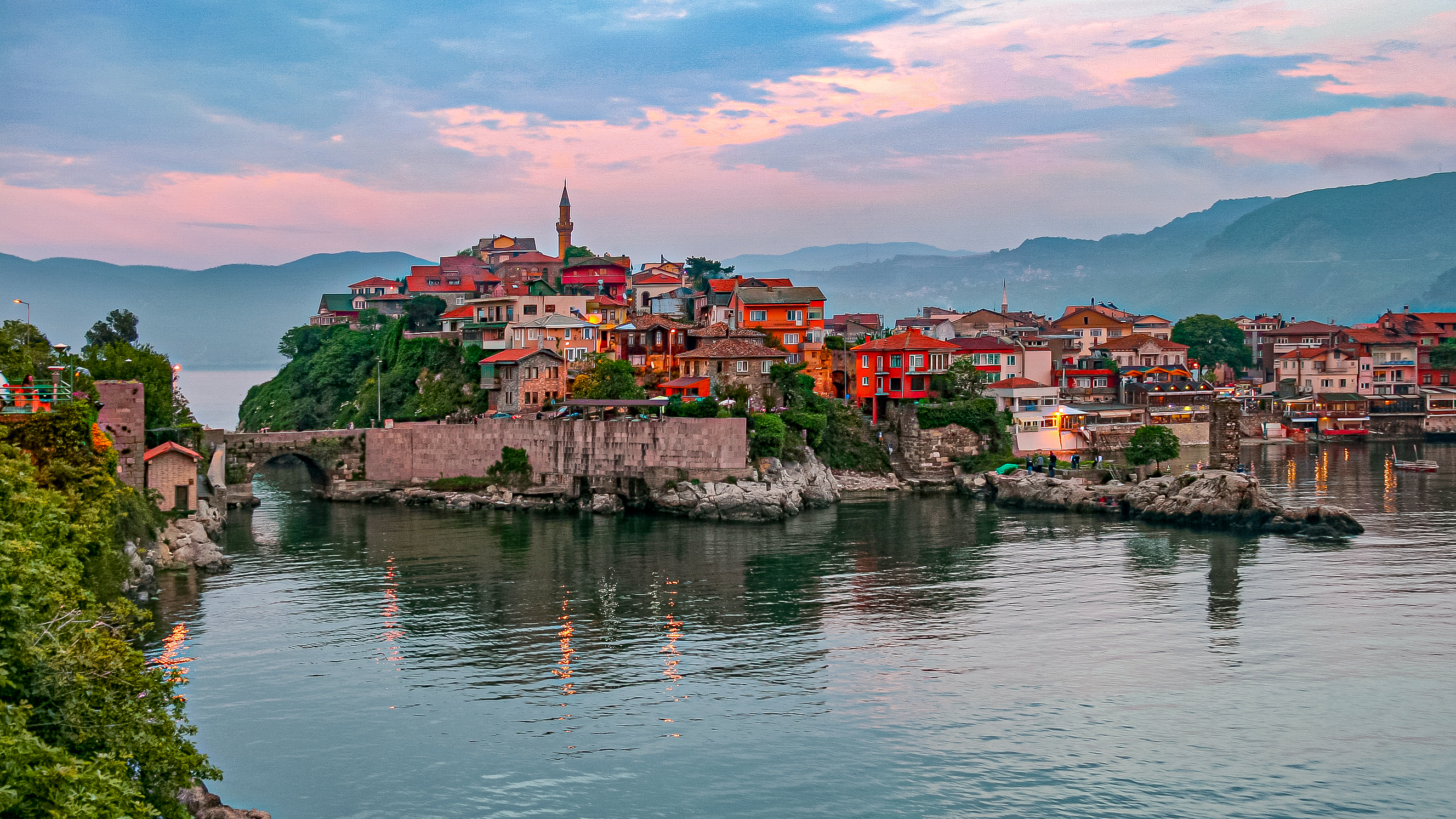
- View of Amasra Castle

- Coat of arms

- Location within Turkey
- Coordinates: 41°44′58″N 32°23′11″E
- Country: Turkey
- Province: Bartın
- District: Amasra

Government
  - Mayor: Recai Çakır (CHP)
- Elevation: 123 m (404 ft)
- Population (2021): 6,098
- Time zone: UTC+3 (TRT)
- Postal code: 74300
- Area code: 0378
- Climate: Cfb
- Website: www.amasra.bel.tr

Amasra (from Greek Amastris Ἄμαστρις, gen. Ἀμάστριδος) is a small Black Sea port town in the Bartın Province, Turkey. It is the seat of Amasra District. Its population is 6,098 (2021).

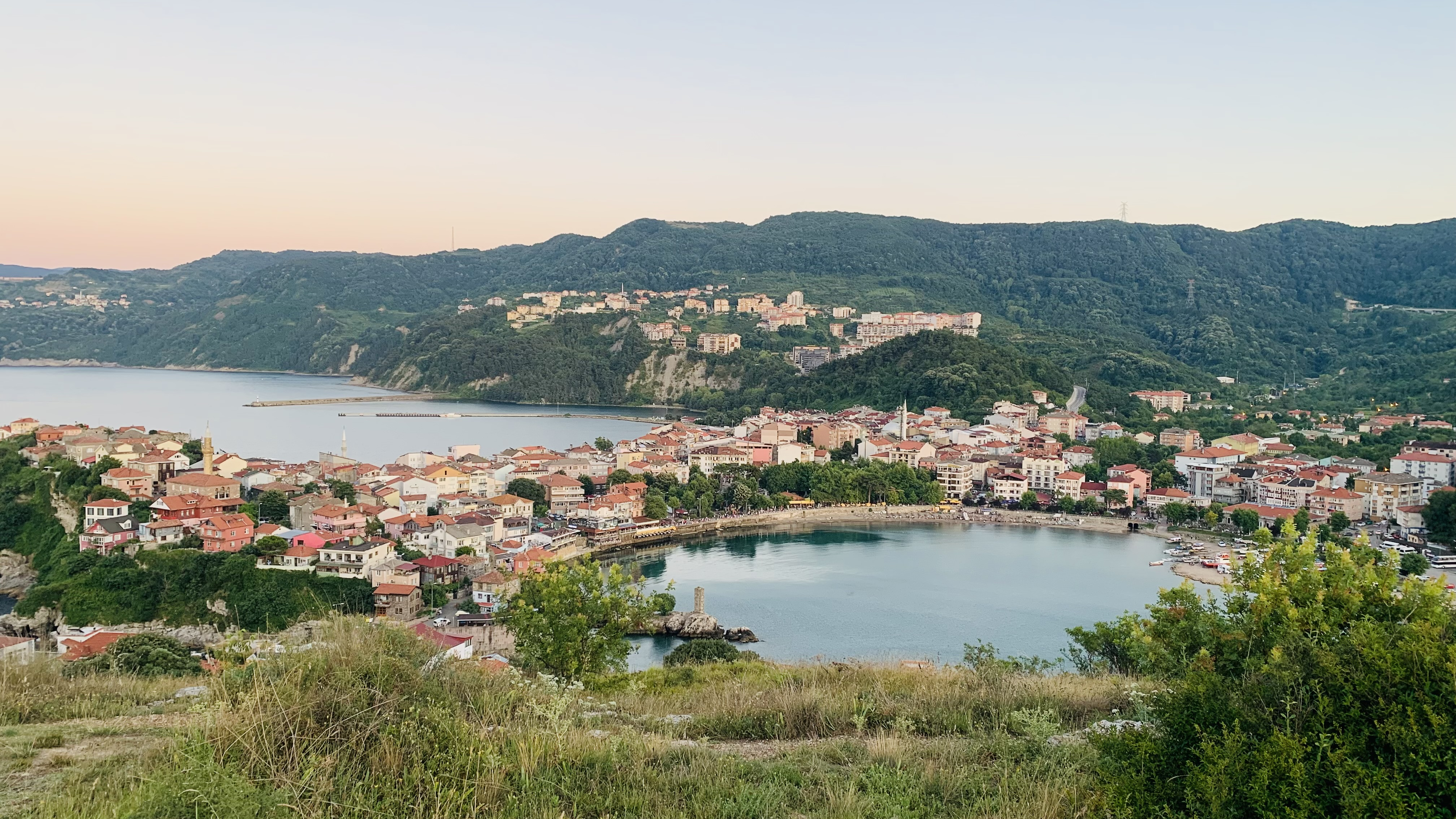
A view of Amasra

The town today is much appreciated for its beaches and natural setting, which has made tourism the most important activity for its inhabitants. Amasra has two islands: the bigger one is called Büyük ada ('Great Island'), the smaller one Tavşan adası ('Rabbit Island'). It was annexed by the Ottoman Empire after the Siege of Amasra.

== History ==
Situated in the ancient region of Paphlagonia, the original city seems to have been called Sesamus (Greek: Σήσαμος), and it is mentioned by Homer in conjunction with Cytorus. Stephanus says that it was originally called Cromna (Ancient Greek: Κρῶμνα); but in another place, where he repeats the statement, he adds, as it is said; but some say that Cromna is a small place in the territory of Amastris, which is the true account. The place derived its name Amastris from Amastris, the niece of the last Persian king Darius III, who was the wife of Dionysius, tyrant of Heraclea, and after his death the wife of Lysimachus. Four small Ionian colonies, Sesamus, Cytorus, Cromna, also mentioned in the Iliad, and Tium, were combined by Amastris, after her separation from Lysimachus, to form the new community of Amastris, placed on a small river of the same name and occupying a peninsula. According to Strabo, Tium soon detached itself from the community, but the rest kept together, and Sesamus was the acropolis of Amastris. From this it appears that Amastris was really a confederation or union of three places, and that Sesamus was the name of the city on the peninsula. This may explain the fact that Mela mentions Sesamus and Cromna as cities of Paphlagonia, while omitting Amastris.

The territory of Amastris produced a great quantity of boxwood, which grew on the nearby Mount Cytorus. Its tyrant Eumenes presented the city of Amastris to Ariobarzanes of Pontus in c. 265–260 BC rather than submit it to domination by Heraclea, and it remained in the Pontic kingdom until its capture by Lucius Lucullus in 70 BC in the second Mithridatic War. The younger Pliny, when he was governor of Bithynia and Pontus, describes Amastris, in a letter to Trajan, as a handsome city, with a very long open place (platea), on one side of which extended what was called a river, but in fact was a filthy, pestilent, open drain. Pliny obtained the emperor's permission to cover over this sewer. On a coin of the time of Trajan, Amastris has the title Metropolis. It continued to be a town of some note to the seventh century of our era. From Amasra got its name an important place of Constantinople, the Amastrianum. Arrian writes that the Amastris was a Greek city, which had a port for ships. He also adds that it was 90 stadia from the river Parthenius and 60 stadia from the Erythini.

The city was not abandoned in the Byzantine Era, when the acropolis was transformed into a fortress and the still surviving church was built. Amastris was sacked by the Rus during the First Russo-Byzantine War in the 830s. Historian Speros Vryonis states that in the 9th century a "combination of local industry, trade, and the produce of its soil made Amastris one of the more prosperous towns of the Black Sea", while the writer Niketas David Paphlagon calls the city the "Eye of Paphlagonia".

During the 12th century, because of Seljuk raids, the city declined and was reduced to a small town. In the 13th century Amastris exchanged hands several times, first, seized by a Georgian army, led by David Komnenos, becoming a possession of the Empire of Trebizond in 1204, then at some point in the next ten years being captured by the Seljuk Turks, until finally in 1261, in her bid to monopolize the Black Sea trade, the town came under the control of the Republic of Genoa. Genoese domination ended when the Ottoman Sultan Mehmed II conquered the whole Anatolian shores of the Black Sea.

The ancient Greek writer Myronianus (Ancient Greek: Μυρωνιανὸς), was from the Amastris.

== Ecclesiastical history ==
The bishopric of Amastris was established early: according to Eusebius, its congregation received a letter from the second-century bishop, Dionysius, Bishop of Corinth, wherein he names their bishop, one Palmas. The see was initially a suffragan of the metropolitan of Gangra, capital of the Roman province of Paphlagonia.

In the late 8th century its bishop obtained from the Byzantine Emperor its elevation to the rank of autocephalous archeparchy. It is listed as such in the Notitia Episcopatuum attributed to Basil the Armenian (c. 840) and in that of Leo VI the Wise (early 10th century).

In the middle of the 10th century, it obtained the rank of metropolitan see without suffragans, a rank it held until, due to the diminution in the number of Christians in the area after the Seljuk invasions, it was suppressed. Amastris assumed the metropolitanate of Heraclea Pontica, following a synod in 1387, due to the latter's decline following its fall to the Turks in 1360.

From the 14th century to the second half of the 15th, the town was also the seat of a bishopric of the Latin Church.

=== Latin titular see ===
No longer a residential bishopric, Amastris (Curiate Italian Amastri) is today listed by the Catholic Church as a titular see.

The diocese was nominally restored in the 19th century as a Latin Catholic titular bishopric and had the following incumbents of the episcopal (lowest) rank:

- Titular Michael Francis Howley (1892.04.28 – 1895.01.05) as Apostolic Vicar of Western Newfoundland (Canada) (1892.04.28 – 1895.01.05), later Bishop of Saint John's, Newfoundland (Canada) (1895.01.05 – 1904.02.08), promoted first Metropolitan Archbishop of Saint John's, Newfoundland (1904.02.08 – 1914.10.15)
- Titular Bishop Antonio Maria Roveggio, Comboni Missionaries (F.S.C.I.) (1895.02.08 – 1902.05.02), Apostolic Vicar of Central Africa (Anglo-Egyptian Sudan) (1895.02.08 – death 1902.05.02)
- Titular Bishop John Joseph O'Gorman, Holy Ghost Fathers (C.S.Sp.) (1903.09.14 – death 1935.04.13), as Apostolic Vicar of Sierra Leone (Sierra Leone) (1903.11.09 – 1932)

In 1929 it was promoted to titular archbishopric. It is vacant as such since decades, having had the following incumbents of the archiepiscopal (intermediary) rank :

- Titular Archbishop Efrem Hykary (1936.07.22 – death 1958.02.09), as Patriarchal Vicar of Antioch of the Syriacs (Lebanon) (1936.07.22 – 1958.02.09)
- Titular Archbishop Teopisto Valderrama Alberto (1959.09.07 – 1965.04.06), as Coadjutor Archbishop of Caceres (Philippines) (1959.09.07 – 1965.04.06), later succeeded as Metropolitan Archbishop of Caceres (1965.04.06 – retired 1983.10.20)

== Main sights ==
With its architectural heritage, Amasra is a member of the Norwich-based European Association of Historic Towns and Regions.

Archaeological Museum: there is a fine medium-sized archaeological museum by the sea with remains from both land and underwater. Of particular interest is a statue of the snake god Glykon, a fraudulent creation of a local entrepreneur during Roman imperial times.

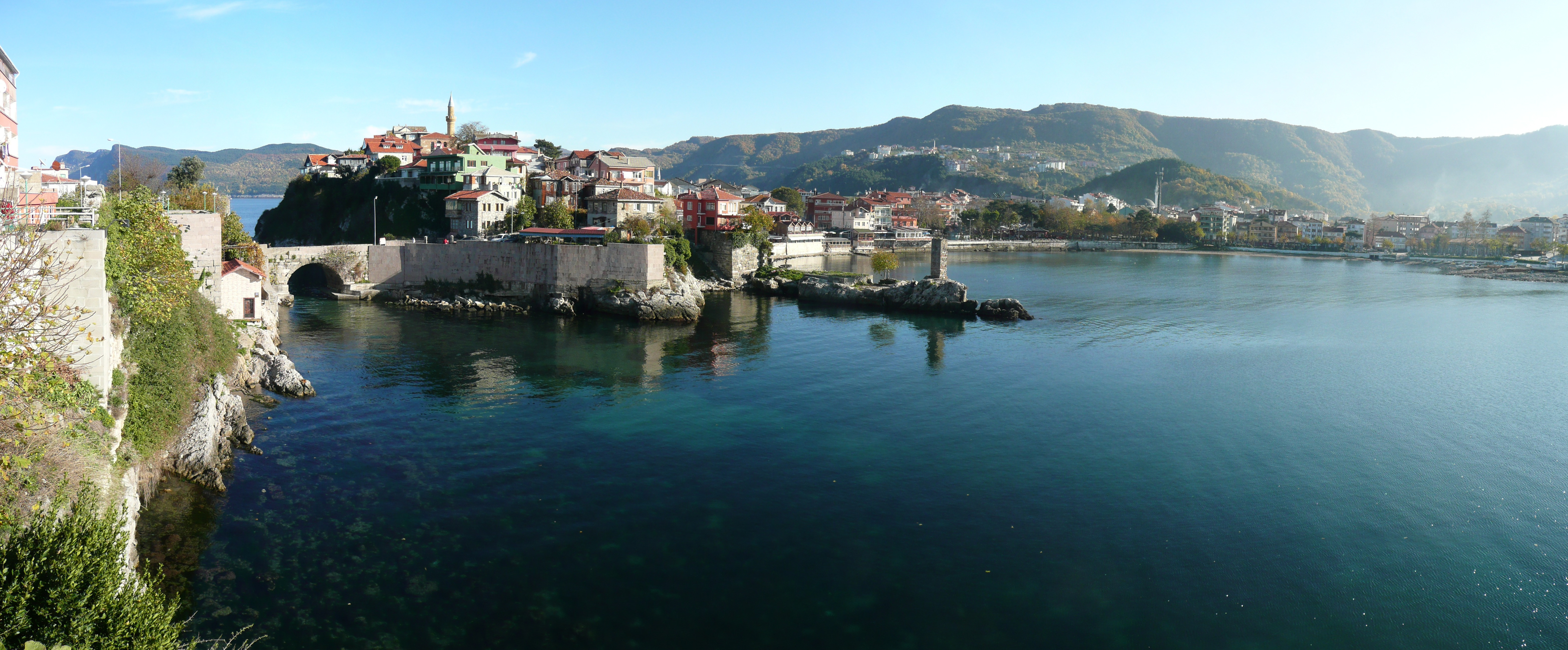
Panoramic view of the town

=== Amasra Castle ===
Amasra Castle was built during the Roman period. The walls of the castle were built by the Byzantines. The front walls and gates were built by the Genoese in the 14th and 15th centuries. Though located on a narrow peninsula, a tunnel under the castle leads to a fresh water pool.

=== Fatih Mosque ===
It was originally built as a Byzantine church in the 9th century AD. The church narthex section consists of three parts. After the Ottoman Sultan Mehmed II conquered Amasra in 1460, it was converted to a mosque. It is open to prayers. There is also a chapel on the same street but it is closed to prayers since 1930.

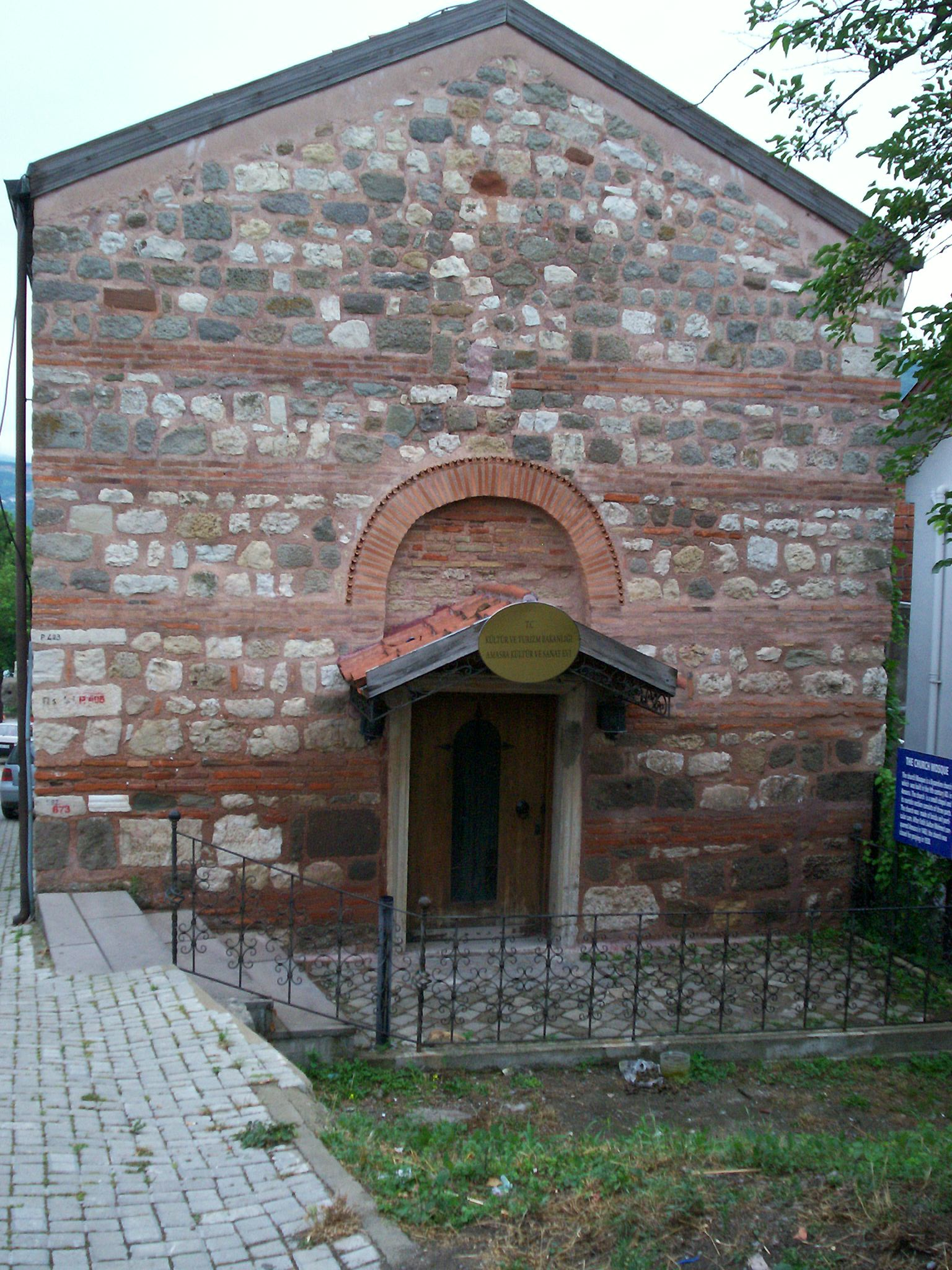
Amasra church mosque

=== Bird's Rock Road Monument ===
Bird's Rock Road Monument was created between AD 41-54 by the order of Bithynia et Pontus Governor Gaius Julius Aquila. It was a resting place and monument. At the time when Claudius was the Roman Emperor, Aquila was the commander of the building army in the eastern provinces. It is located a little outside Amasra, and is easily accessed by steps leading from the roadside.

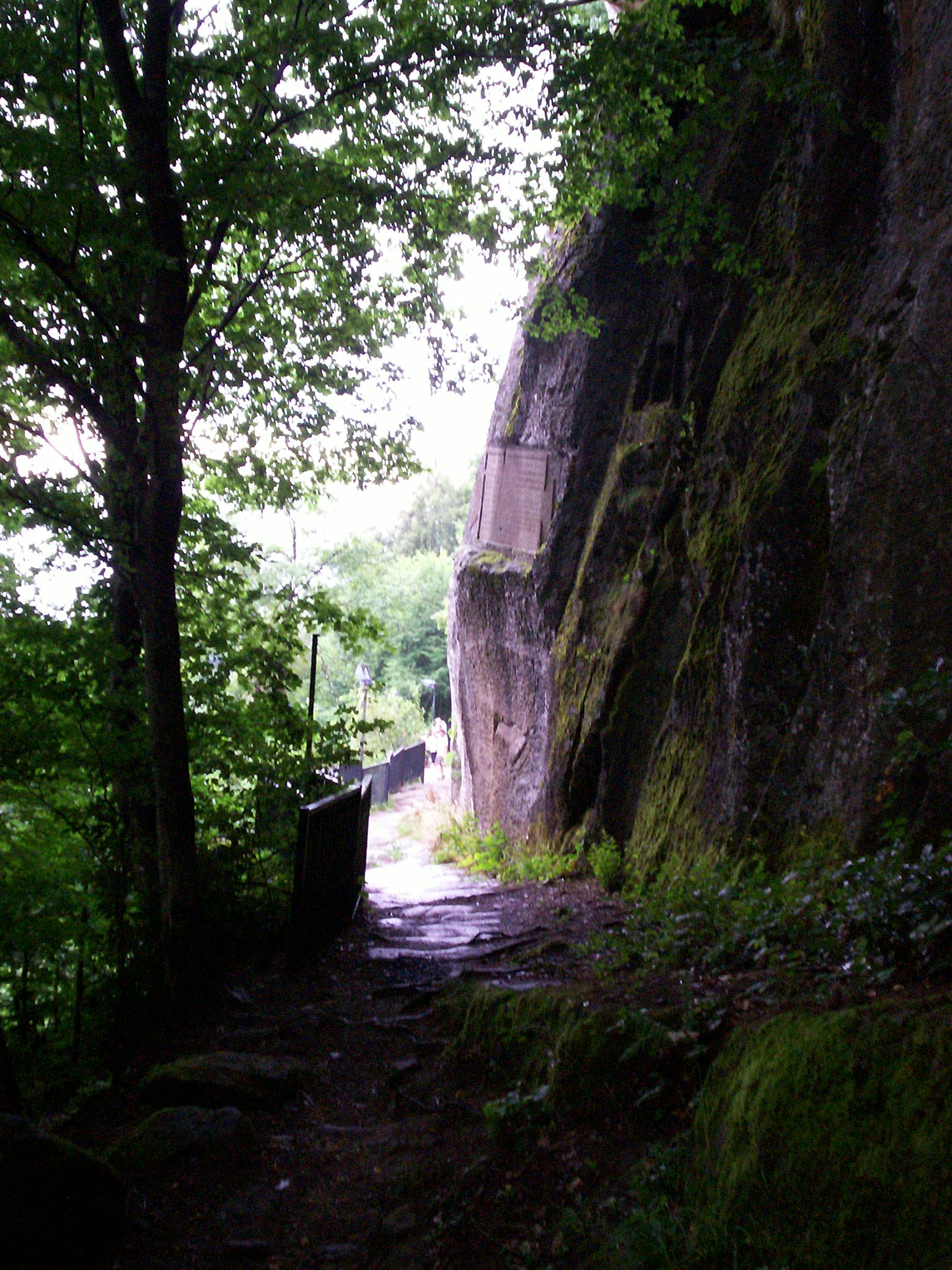
Bird's Rock Road Monument

== Coal mine and proposed power station ==
In 2009, a coal-fired power station of 2640 MWe (or 1200 MWe) was proposed by a subsidiary of Hattat Holding, but after concerns were raised about the effect on air quality, marine ecology, and ash it was not built. They now propose just a coal mine.
