= Paphlagonia =

Historical region of northern Anatolia

Coordinates: 41.5°N 33.5°E

Paphlagonia (Παφλαγονία)
- Historical Region of Anatolia
- Location: North central Anatolia, Turkey
- State existed: 5th century – 183 BC
- Historical capitals: Gangra (modern-day Çankırı, Turkey)
- Achaemenid satrapy: Cappadocia
- Roman province: Pontus

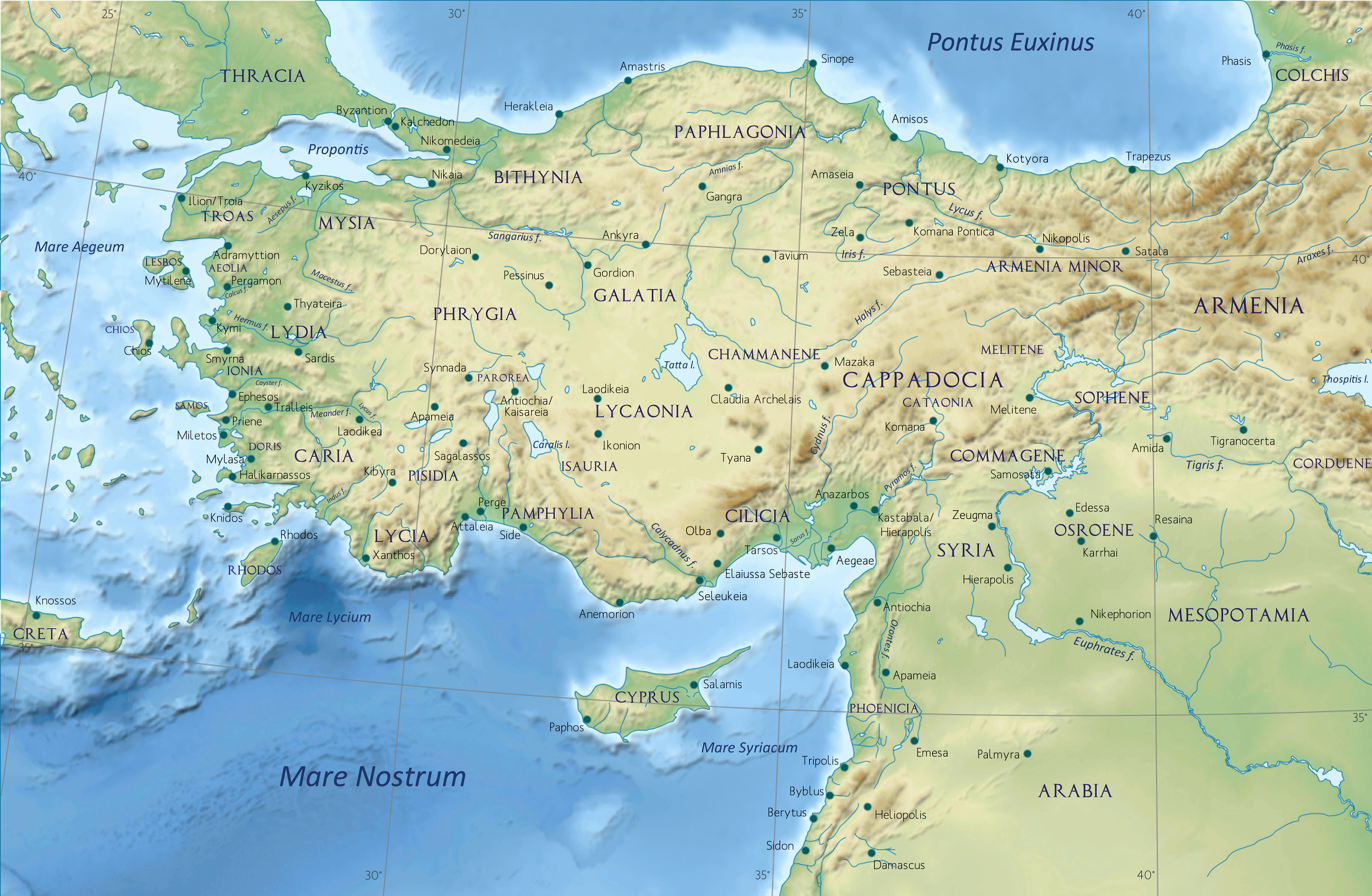

Paphlagonia (/ˌpæfləˈɡoʊniə/; Greek: Παφλαγονία, romanized: Paphlagonía, modern translit. Paflagonía was an ancient region on the Black Sea coast of north-central Anatolia, situated between Bithynia to the west and Pontus to the east, and separated from Phrygia (later, Galatia) by a prolongation to the east of the Bithynian Olympus. According to Strabo, the region was bounded by the river Parthenius to the west and the Halys River to the east. Paphlagonia was said to be named after Paphlagon, a son of the mythical Phineus.

== Location ==
The greater part of Paphlagonia is a rugged mountainous country, but it contains fertile valleys and produces a great abundance of hazelnuts and fruit – particularly plums, cherries and pears. The mountains are clothed with dense forests, notable for the quantity of boxwood that they furnish

== History ==
In the time of the Hittites, Paphlagonia was inhabited by the Kashka people, whose exact ethnic relation to the Paphlagonians is uncertain. It seems perhaps that they were related to the people of the adjoining country, Cappadocia, who were speakers of one of the Anatolian branch of the Indo-European languages. Their language would appear, from Strabo's testimony, to have been distinctive.

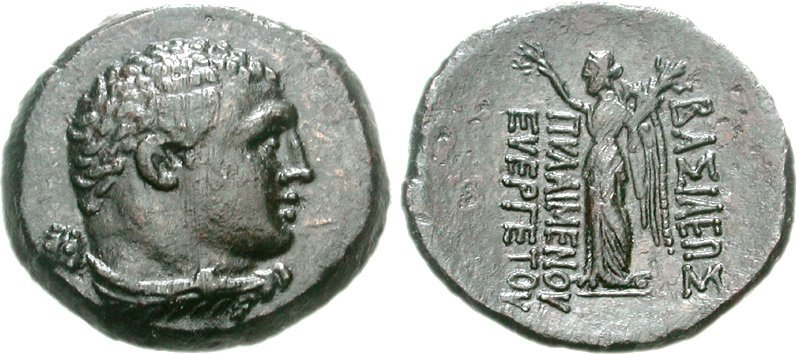
King of Paphlagonia Pylaimenes II/III Euergetes. Circa 133 to 103 BC

The Paphlagonians were one of the most ancient nations of Anatolia and were listed among the allies of the Trojans in the Trojan War (ca. 1200 BC or 1250 BC), where their king Pylaemenes and his son Harpalion perished (Iliad, ii. 851–857). According to Homer and Livy, the Paphlagonians, called the Enetoi in Greek after the Trojan war did not return to their city but continued westwards towards the Adriatic Sea and founded Venice.With a group of defeated Trojans under the leadership of the Trojan prince Antenor, they emigrated to the northern end of the Adriatic coast and later merged with indigenous Euganei, giving the name Venetia to the area they settled.

The coasts were settled by Greeks from an early period. Among these, the flourishing city of Sinope, founded by colonists from Miletus in ca. 630 BC, stood pre-eminent. Amastris, a few miles east of the Parthenius river, became important under the rule of the Macedonian monarchs; while Amisus, a colony of Sinope situated a short distance east of the Halys river (and therefore not strictly in Paphlagonia as defined by Strabo), grew to become almost a rival of its parent city.

The most considerable towns of the interior were Gangra – in ancient times the capital of the Paphlagonian kings, afterwards called Germanicopolis, situated near the frontier of Galatia – and Pompeiopolis, in the valley of the Amnias river, near extensive mines of the mineral called by Strabo sandarake (red arsenic or arsenic sulfide), largely exported from Sinope.

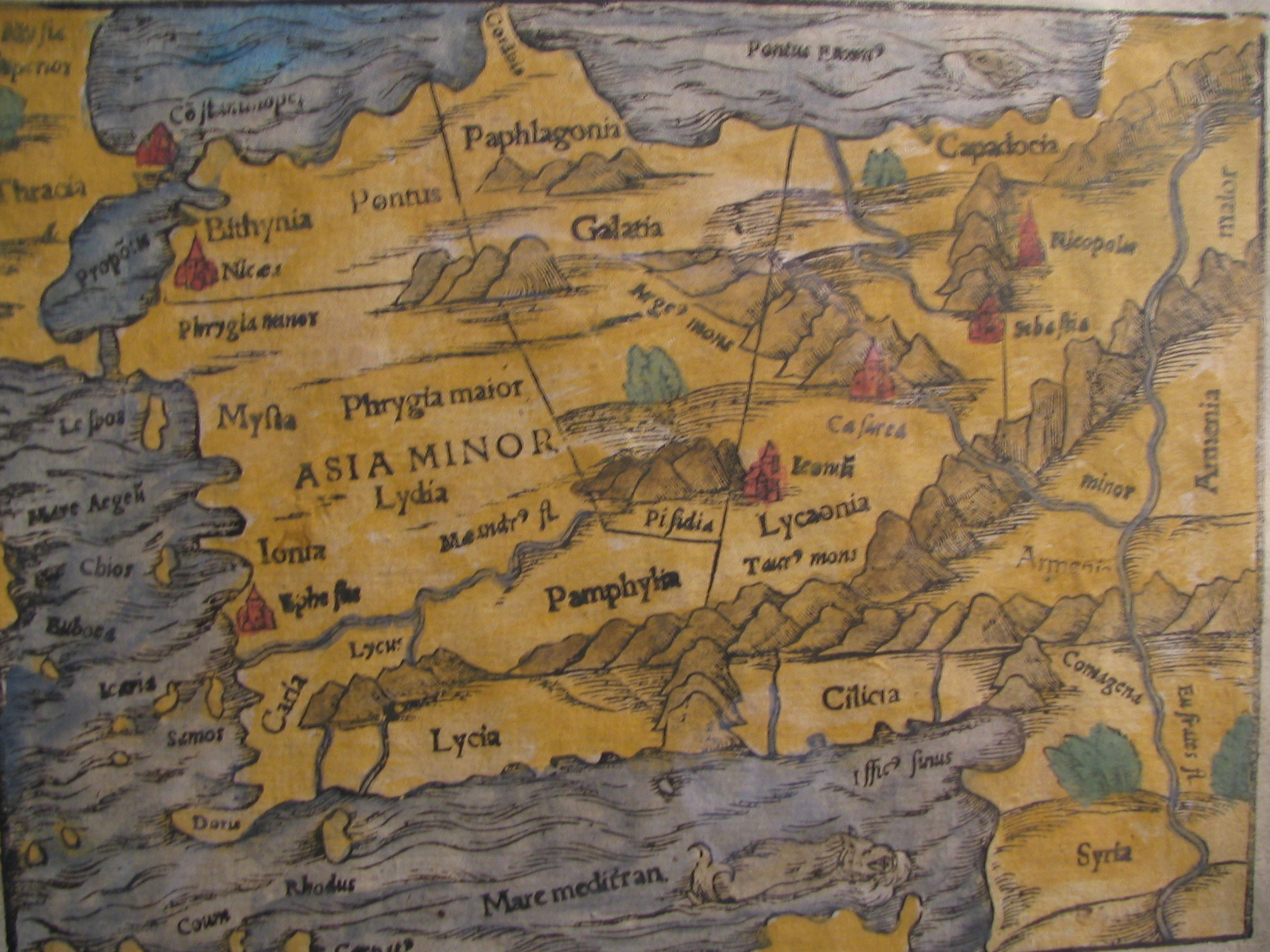
Detail of a 15th-century map showing Anatolia, with Paphlagonia at top

Paphlagonians were mentioned by Herodotus among the peoples conquered by Croesus, and they sent an important contingent to the army of Xerxes in 480 BC. Xenophon speaks of them as being governed by a prince of their own, without any reference to the neighboring satraps, a freedom perhaps due to the nature of their country, with its lofty mountain ranges and difficult passes. All these rulers appear to have borne the name Pylaimenes as a sign that they claimed descent from the chieftain of that name who figures in the Iliad as leader of the Paphlagonians.

=== Under the Kingdom of Pontus ===
At a later period, Paphlagonia passed under the control of the Macedonian kings, and after the death of Alexander the Great, it was assigned, together with Cappadocia and Mysia, to Eumenes. However, it continued to be governed by native princes until it was absorbed by the hellenistic Kingdom of Pontus. The rulers of that dynasty became masters of the greater part of Paphlagonia as early as the reign of Mithridates Ctistes (302–266 BC), but it was not until 183 BC that Pharnaces reduced the Greek city of Sinope under their control. From that time, the whole province was incorporated into the kingdom of Pontus until the fall of Mithridates (65 BC).

=== Roman and Byzantine empires ===
Pompey united the coastal districts of Paphlagonia, along with the greater part of Pontus, with the Roman province of Bithynia et Pontus, but left the interior of the country under the native princes, until the dynasty became extinct and the whole country was incorporated into the Roman Empire. The name was still retained by geographers, though its boundaries are not distinctly defined by the geographer Claudius Ptolemy. Paphlagonia reappeared as a separate province in the 5th century AD (Hierocles, Synecdemus c. 33). In the 7th century it became part of the theme of Opsikion, and later of the Bucellarian Theme, before being split off c. 820 to form a separate province once again. Under the Byzantine Empire many high ranking officers as well as Emperors came from the region of Paphlagonia.

== Notable people ==
- Artoxares (5th century BC) eunuch, envoy of Persian kings Artaxerxes I and Darius II.
- Diogenes of Sinope (4th century BC) Greek philosopher, one of the founders of Cynic philosophy.
- Alexander of Abonoteichus (c. 105 – c. 170 AD), also called Alexander the Paphlagonian, or the false prophet Alexander.
- Saint Philaretos (8th century).
- Theodora (9th century), wife of the Byzantine emperor Theophilus.
- John Mauropous (11th century), Eastern Roman poet and author.
- Michael IV the Paphlagonian (c. 1010 – 1041 AD), Byzantine emperor.
- Eumenes of Cardia (until he decided to leave for Troja and return to Cardia).
- Sergios Niketiates senior Byzantine official and member of the Amorian dynasty.
- Niketas David Paphlagon a prolific Byzantine Greek writer of the late 9th and early 10th century.
- Stylianos of Paphlagonia (5th century), is venerated as a saint from Adrianopolis in the province of Paphlagonia.

== See also ==
- Ancient regions of Anatolia
- List of rulers of Paphlagonia
- Adriatic Veneti
- Kastamonu
