= Lycia =

Ancient geopolitical region of Anatolia (Turkey)

Coordinates: 36°44′N 29°54′E

Lycia Lukka Likya 𐊗𐊕𐊐𐊎𐊆𐊖 (Trm̃mis) Λυκία (Lykia)
- Ancient Region of Anatolia
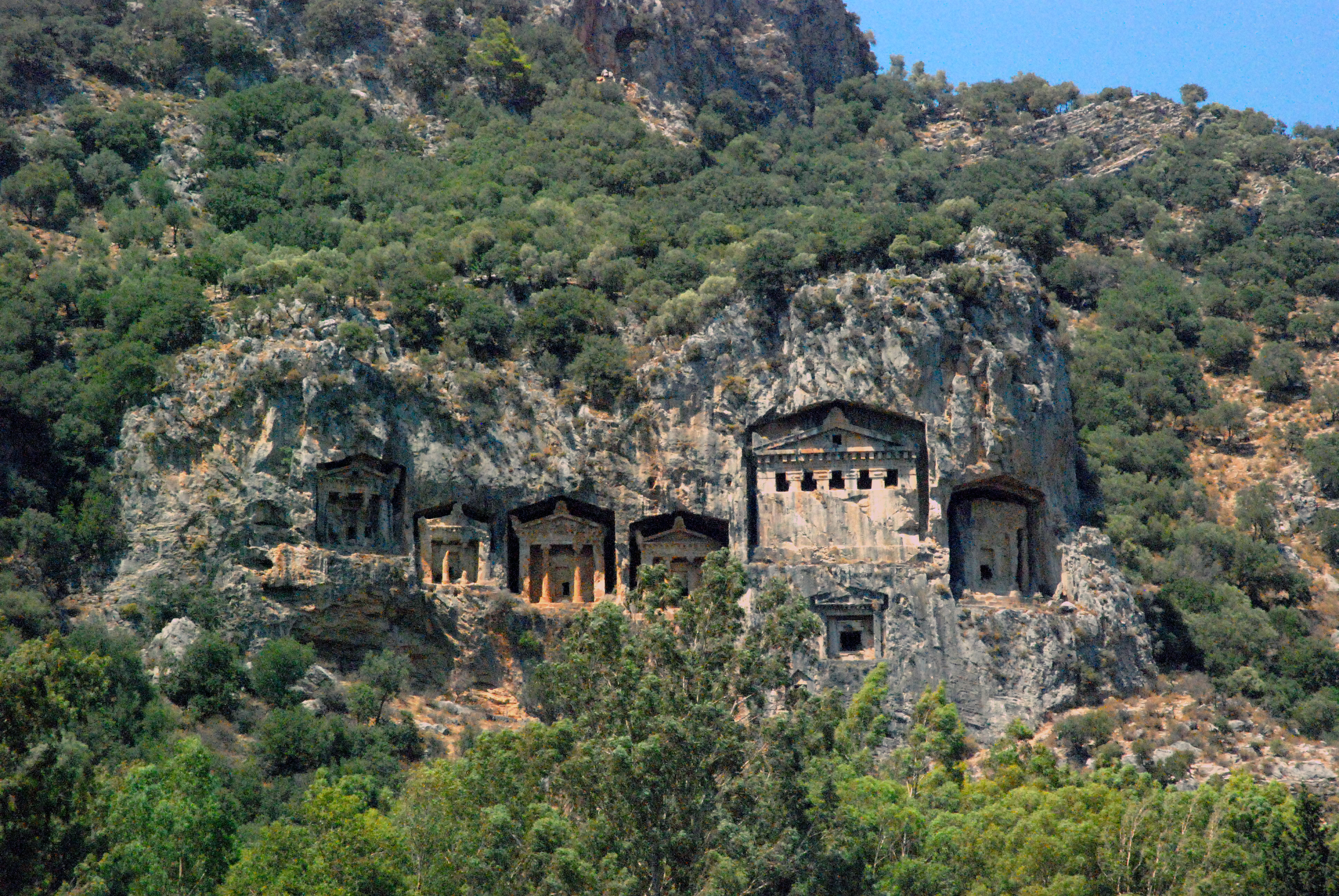
- Lycian rock cut tombs of Dalyan
- Location: Teke Peninsula, Western Taurus Range, Southern Anatolia, Turkey
- Languages: Lycian, Greek
- Successive capitals: Xanthos (Kınık) Patara (Gelemiş)
- Achaemenid satrapy: Cilicia & Lydia
- Roman protectorate: Lycian League
- Roman province: Lycia, then Lycia with other states
- Byzantine eparchy: Lykia
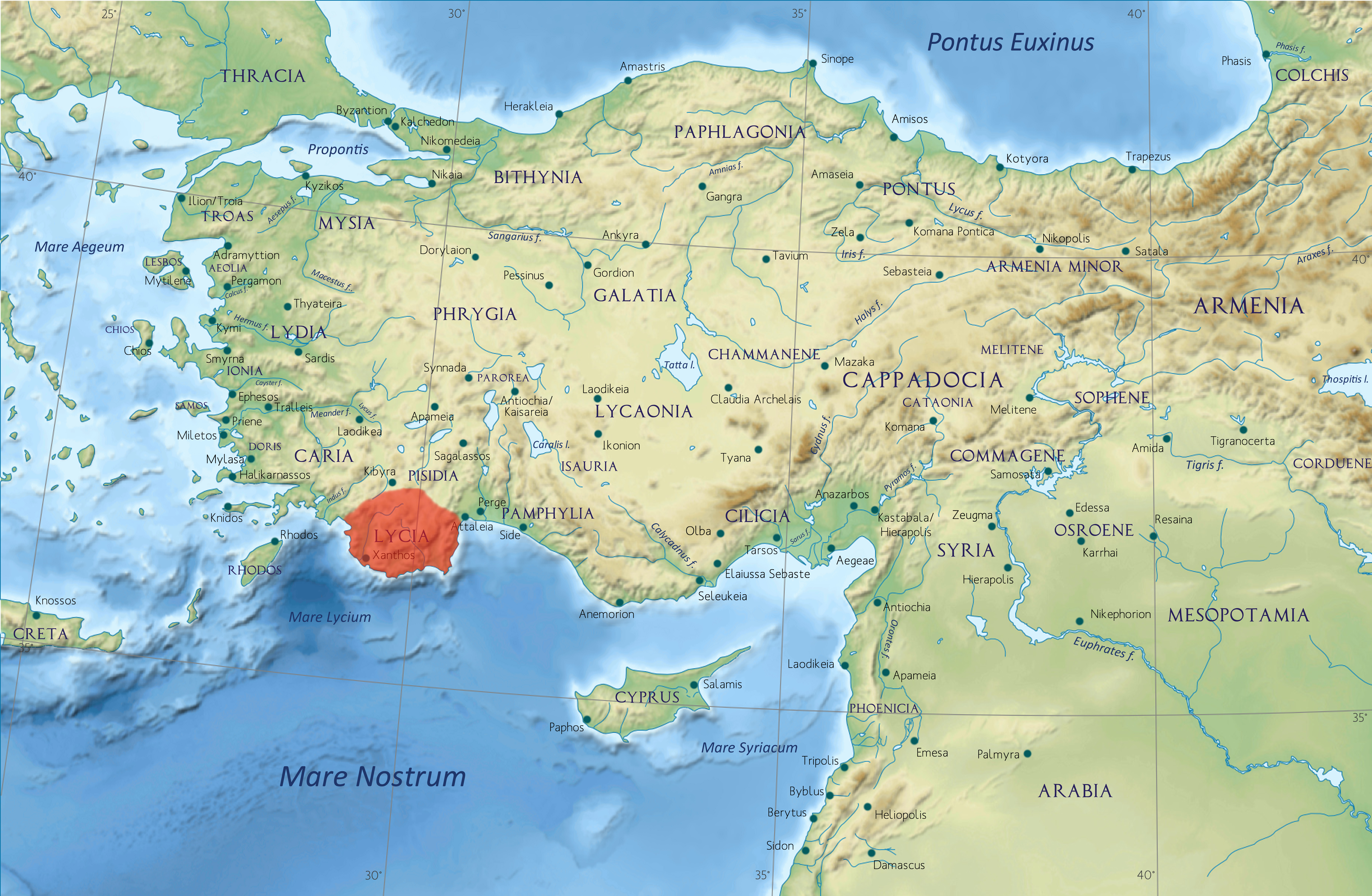
- Location of Lycia. Anatolia/Asia Minor in the Greco-Roman period. The classical regions, including Lycia, and their main settlements

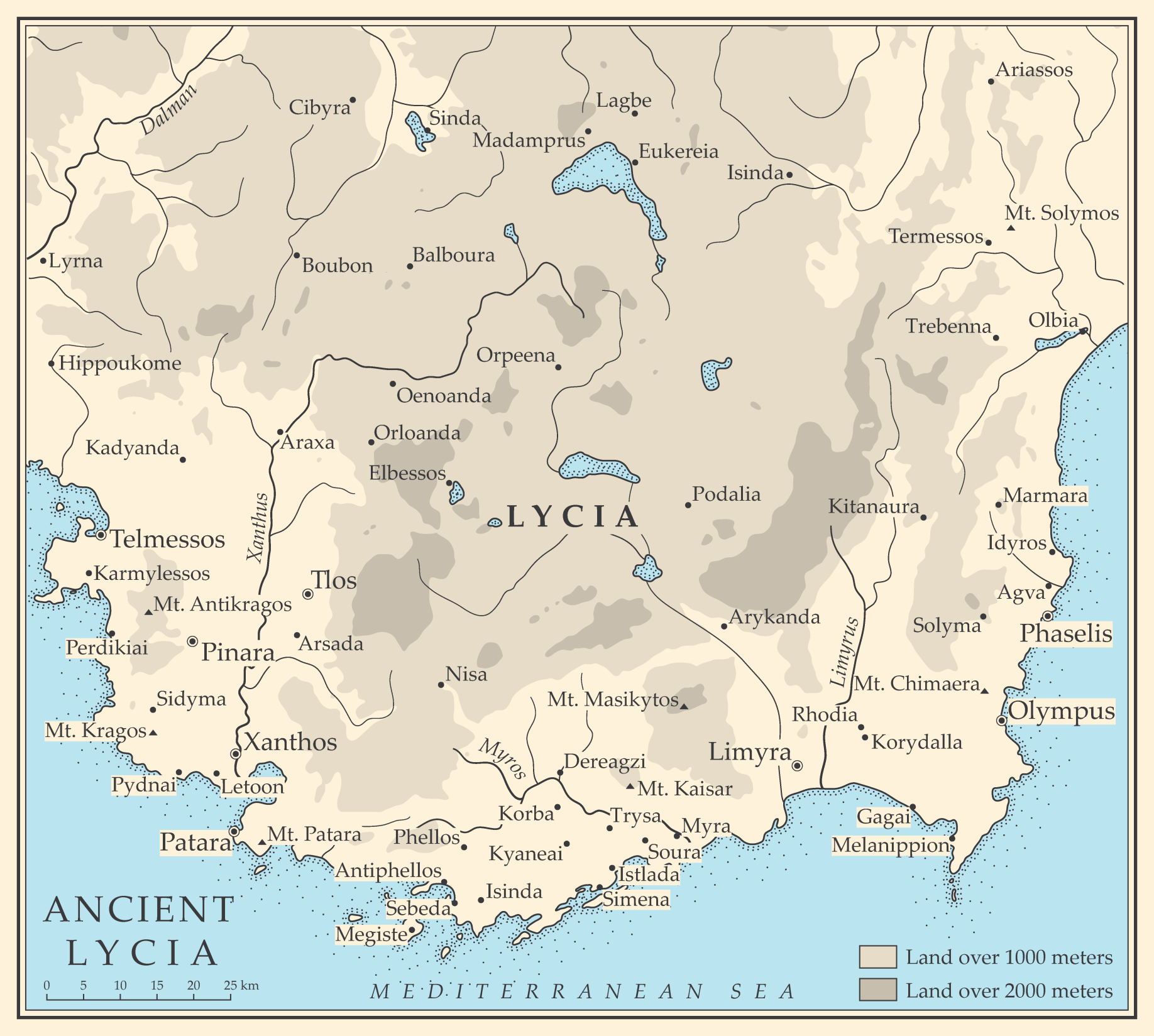

Lycia (/ˈlɪsiə/; Lycian: 𐊗𐊕𐊐𐊎𐊆𐊖 Trm̃mis; Greek: Λυκία, Lykia; Turkish: Likya) was a historical region in Anatolia from 15–14th centuries BC (as Lukka) to 546 BC. It bordered the Mediterranean Sea in what is today the provinces of Antalya and Muğla in Turkey as well some inland parts of Burdur Province. The region was known to history from the Late Bronze Age records of ancient Egypt and the Hittite Empire.

Lycia was populated by speakers of Luwic languages. Written records began to be inscribed in stone in the Lycian language after Lycia's forced colonization by the Achaemenid Empire in the Iron Age. At that time (546 BC) the Luwian speakers were displaced as Lycia received an influx of Persian speakers.

The many cities in Lycia were wealthy as shown by their elaborate architecture starting at least from the 5th century BC and extending to the Roman period.

Lycia fought for the Persians in the Persian Wars, but on the defeat of the Achaemenid Empire by the Greeks, it became intermittently a free agent. After a brief membership in the Athenian Empire, it seceded and became independent (its treaty with Athens had omitted the usual non-secession clause), was under the Persians again, revolted again, was conquered by Mausolus of Caria, returned to the Persians, and finally fell under Macedonian hegemony upon the defeat of the Persians by Alexander the Great. Due to the influx of Greek speakers and the sparsity of the remaining Lycian speakers, Lycia was rapidly Hellenized under the Macedonians, and the Lycian language disappeared from inscriptions and coinage.

On defeating Antiochus III the Great in 188 BC, the Roman Republic gave Lycia to Rhodes for 20 years, taking it back in 168 BC. In these latter stages of the Roman Republic, Lycia came to enjoy freedom as a Roman protectorate. The Romans validated home rule officially under the Lycian League in 168 BC. This native government was an early federation with republican principles; these later came to the attention of the framers of the United States Constitution, particularly James Madison, influencing their thoughts.

Despite home rule, Lycia was not a sovereign state and had not been since its defeat by the Carians. In 43 AD the Roman emperor Claudius dissolved the league, and Lycia was incorporated into the Roman province of Lycia et Pamphylia. In 395 AD, the province was assigned to the Eastern Roman Empire. It lost the region to the Sultanate of Rum in the early 13th century, which itself collapsed in 1308 AD. It was then absorbed by the Beylik of Teke and came under the rule of the Ottoman Empire in 1423 AD. Lycia was inherited by the Turkish Republic after the Dissolution of the Ottoman Empire.

== Geography ==
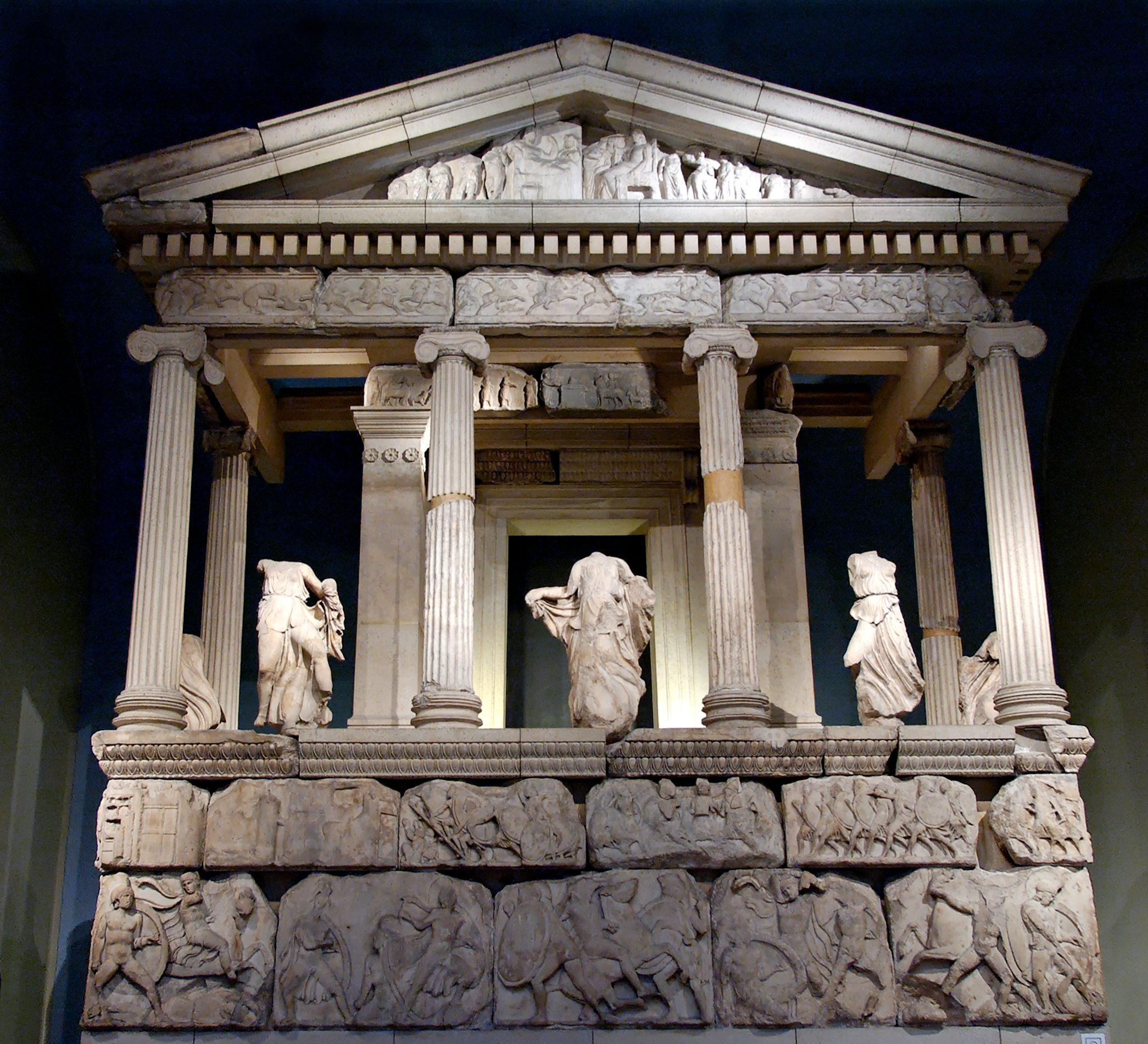
Partial reconstruction of the Nereid Monument at Xanthos in Lycia, c. 390–380 BC.

The borders of Lycia varied over time, but at its centre was the Teke peninsula of southwestern Turkey, which juts southward into the Mediterranean Sea, bounded on the west by the Gulf of Fethiye, and on the east by the Gulf of Antalya. Lycia comprised what is now the westernmost portion of Antalya Province, the easternmost portion of Muğla Province, and the southernmost portion of Burdur Province. In ancient times the surrounding districts were, from west to east, Caria, Pisidia, and Pamphylia, all equally as ancient, and each speaking its own Anatolian language.

The name of the Teke Peninsula comes from the former name of Antalya Province, which was Teke Province, named from the Turkish tribe that settled in the region.

=== Physical geography ===
Four ridges extend from northeast to southwest, roughly, forming the western extremity of the Taurus Mountains. Furthest west of the four are Boncuk Dağlari, or 'the Boncuk Mountains', extending from about Altinyayla, Burdur, southwest to about Oren north of Fethiye. This is a fairly low range peaking at about 2,340 m (7,680 ft). To the west of it the steep gorges of Dalaman Çayi ('the Dalaman River'), the ancient Indus, formed the traditional border between Caria and Lycia. The stream, 229 km (142 mi) long, enters the Mediterranean to the west of modern-day Dalaman. Upstream it is dammed in four places, after an origin in the vicinity of Sarikavak in Denizli Province.

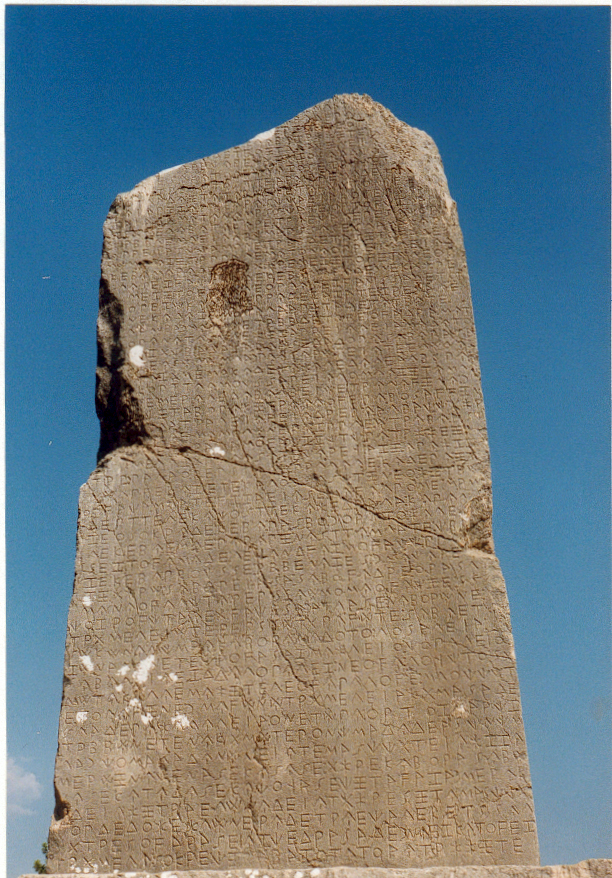
Inscribed Xanthian Obelisk (c. 400 BC), a funerary pillar for a sarcophagus that probably belonged to Dynast Kheriga.

The next ridge to the east is Akdağlari, 'the White Mountains', about 150 km (93 mi) long, with a high point at Uyluktepe, "Uyluk Peak", of 3,024 m (9,921 ft). This massif may have been ancient Mount Cragus. Along its western side flows Eşen Çayi, "the Esen River", anciently the Xanthos, Lycian Arñna, originating in the Boncuk Mountains, flowing south, and transecting the several-mile-long beach at Patara. The Xanthos Valley was the country called Tŗmmis in dynastic Lycia, from which the people were the Termilae or Tremilae, or Kragos in the coin inscriptions of Greek Lycia: Kr or Ksan Kr. The name of western Lycia was given by Charles Fellows to it and points of Lycia west of it.

The next ridge to the east, Beydağlari, 'the Bey Mountains', peaks at Kizlarsevrisi, 3,086 m (10,125 ft), the highest point of the Teke Peninsula. It is most likely the ancient Masicytus range. Between Beydağlari and Akdağlari is an upland plateau, Elmali, where ancient Milyas was located. The elevation of the town of Elmali, which means 'Apple Town,' from the density of fruit-bearing groves in the region, is 1,100 m (3,600 ft), which is the highest part of the valley below it. Fellows considered the valley to be central Lycia.

The Akçay, or 'White River', the ancient Aedesa, brought water from the slopes to the plain, where it pooled in two lakes below the town, Karagöl and Avlangöl. Currently the two lakes are dry, the waters being captured on an ongoing basis by irrigation systems for the trees. The Aedesa once drained the plain through a chasm to the east, but now flows entirely through pipelines covering the same route, but emptying into the water supplies of Arycanda and Arif. An effort has been made to restore some of the cedar forests cleared in antiquity.

The easternmost ridge extends along the east coast of the Teke Peninsula, and is called, generally, Tahtali Dağlari, "The Tahtali Mountains." The high point within them is Tahtali Dağ, elevation 2,366 m (7,762 ft), dubbed "Mount Olympus" in antiquity by the Greeks, remembering Mount Olympus in Greece. These mountains create a rugged coastline called by Fellows eastern Lycia. Much of it has been reserved as Olimpos Beydağlari Parki. Within the park on the slopes of Mount Olympus is a U-shaped outcrop, Yanartaş, above Cirali, from which methane gas, naturally perpetually escaping from below through the rocks, feeds eternal flames. This is the location of ancient Mount Chimaera.

Through the cul-de-sac between Baydağlari and Tahtalidağlari, the Alakir Çay ('Alakir River'), the ancient Limyra, flows to the south trickling from the broad valley under superhighway D400 near downtown Kumluca across a barrier beach into the Mediterranean. This configuration is entirely modern. Upstream the river is impounded behind Alakir Dam to form an urban-size reservoir. Below the reservoir a braided stream alternates with a single, small channel flowing through irrigated land. The wide bed gives an indication of the former size of the river. Upstream from the reservoir the stream lies in an unaltered gorge, flowing from the slopes of Baydağlari. The ancient route to Antalya goes up the valley and over the cul-de-sac, as the coast itself is impassible except by boat. The valley was the seat of ancient Solymus, home of the Solymi.

=== Demography ===
There are at least 381 ancient settlements in the broader region of Lycia-Pamphylia, with the vast majority of these in Lycia. These are situated either along the coastal strip in the protecting coves or on the slopes and hills of the mountain ranges. They are often difficult to access, which in ancient times was a defensive feature. The rugged coastline favored well-defended ports from which, in troubled times, Lycian pirate fleets sallied forth.

The principal cities of ancient Lycia were Xanthos, Patara, Myra, Pinara, Tlos and Olympos (each entitled to three votes in the Lycian League) and Phaselis. Cities such as Telmessos and Krya were sometimes listed by Classical authors as Carian and sometimes as Lycian.

== Modern Tourism ==
Rock-cut Temple-like tombs

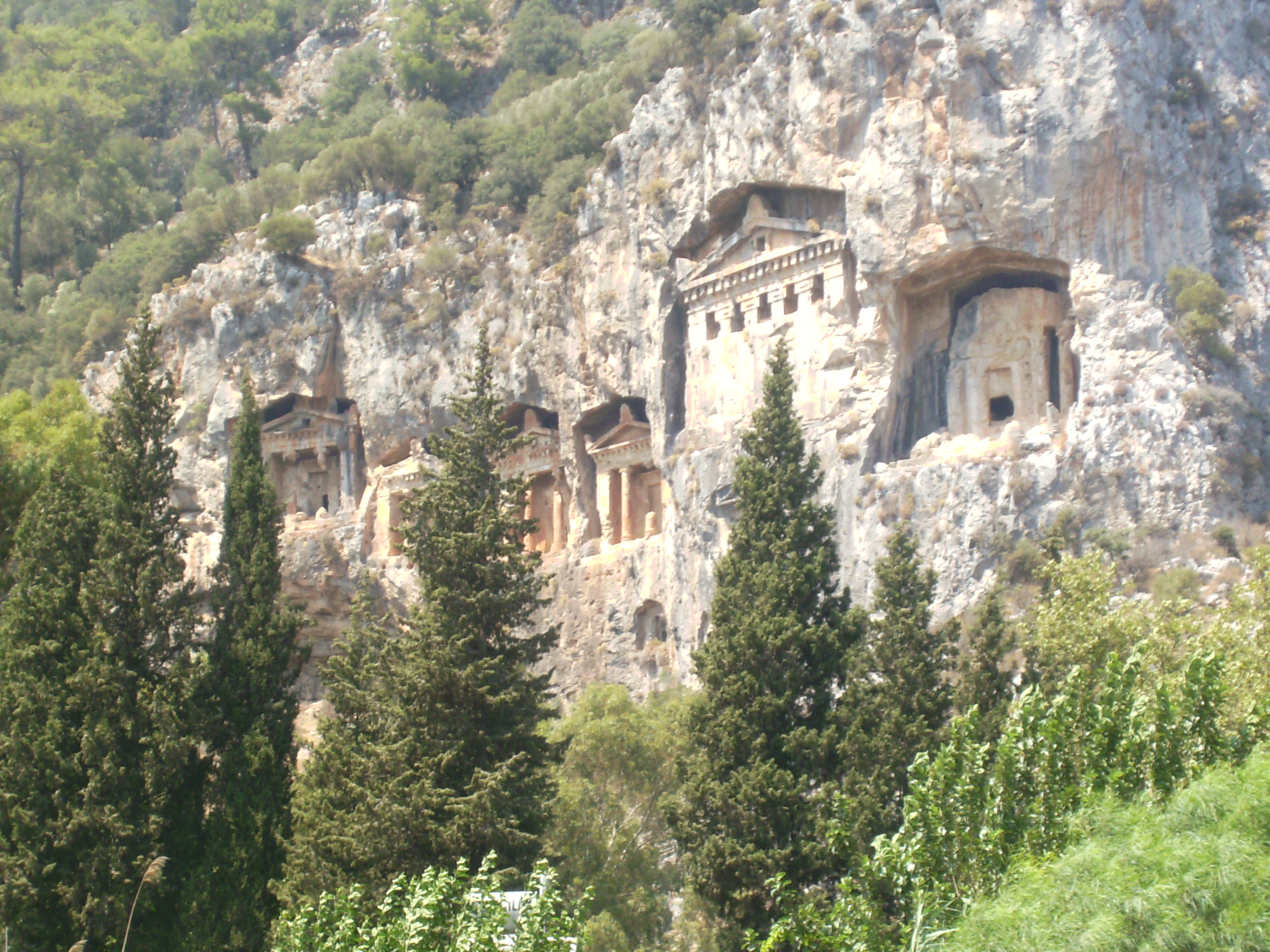
Lycian rock cut tombs of Dalyan.

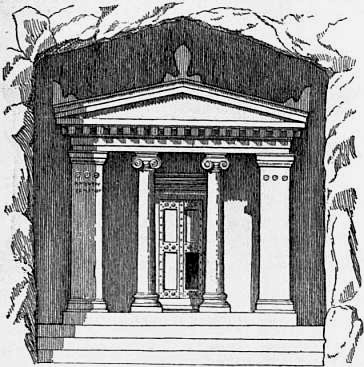
Rock-cut tomb at Telmessus.

Although the 2nd-century BC dialogue Erōtes found the cities of Lycia "interesting more for their history than for their monuments, since they have retained none of their former splendor," many relics of the Lycians remain visible today. These relics include the distinctive rock-cut tombs in the sides of cliffs. The British Museum in London contains one of the best collections of Lycian artifacts. Letoon, an important center in Hellenic times of worship for the goddess Leto and her twin children, Apollo and Artemis, and nearby Xanthos, ancient capital of Lycia, constitute a UNESCO World Heritage Site.

Turkey's first waymarked long-distance footpath, the Lycian Way, follows part of the coast of the region. The establishment of the path was a private initiative by a British/Turkish woman called Kate Clow. It is intended to support sustainable tourism in smaller mountain villages which are in the process of depopulation. Since it is mainly walked in March – June and Sept–Nov, it also has lengthened the tourism season. The Turkish Culture and Tourism Ministry promotes the Lycian coast as part of the Turkish Riviera or the Turquoise Coast, but the most important part of this is further west near Bodrum. This coast features rocky or sandy beaches at the bases of cliffs and settlements in protected coves that cater to the yachting industry.

Yeşilüzümlü village is a popular touristic attraction among the tourists beyond the Lycian Way due to its historic architecture and narrow cobblestone streets. The village is also located near the Cadyanda ruins, which date back to 3000 BCE, that are also popular among the tourists. The inhabitants are also known for their weavings called "Dastar", which Turkish Patent Institute granted a geographical indication status in 2019.

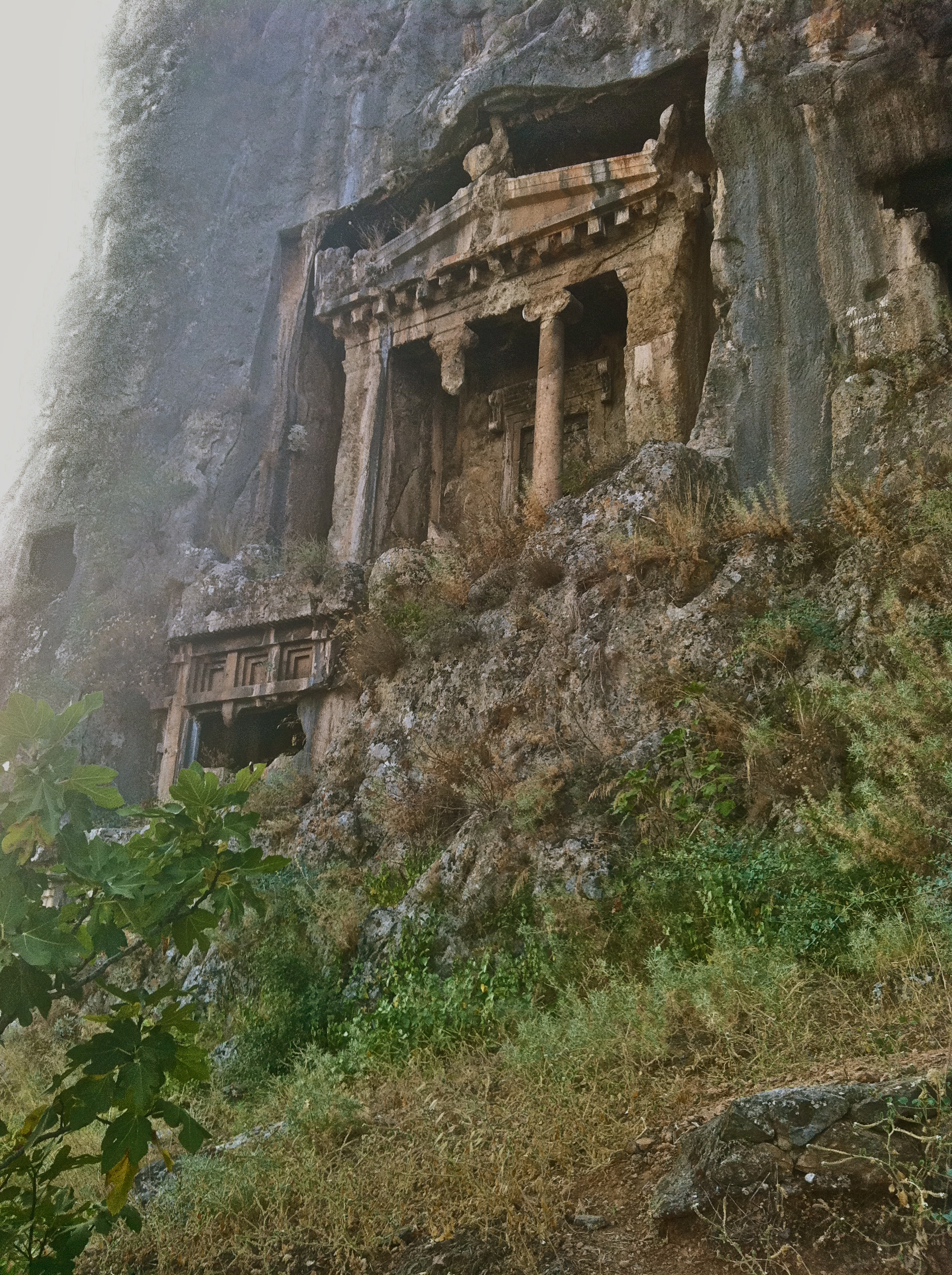
Telmessos rock tomb. The sign on site says the tombs date from about 400 BC

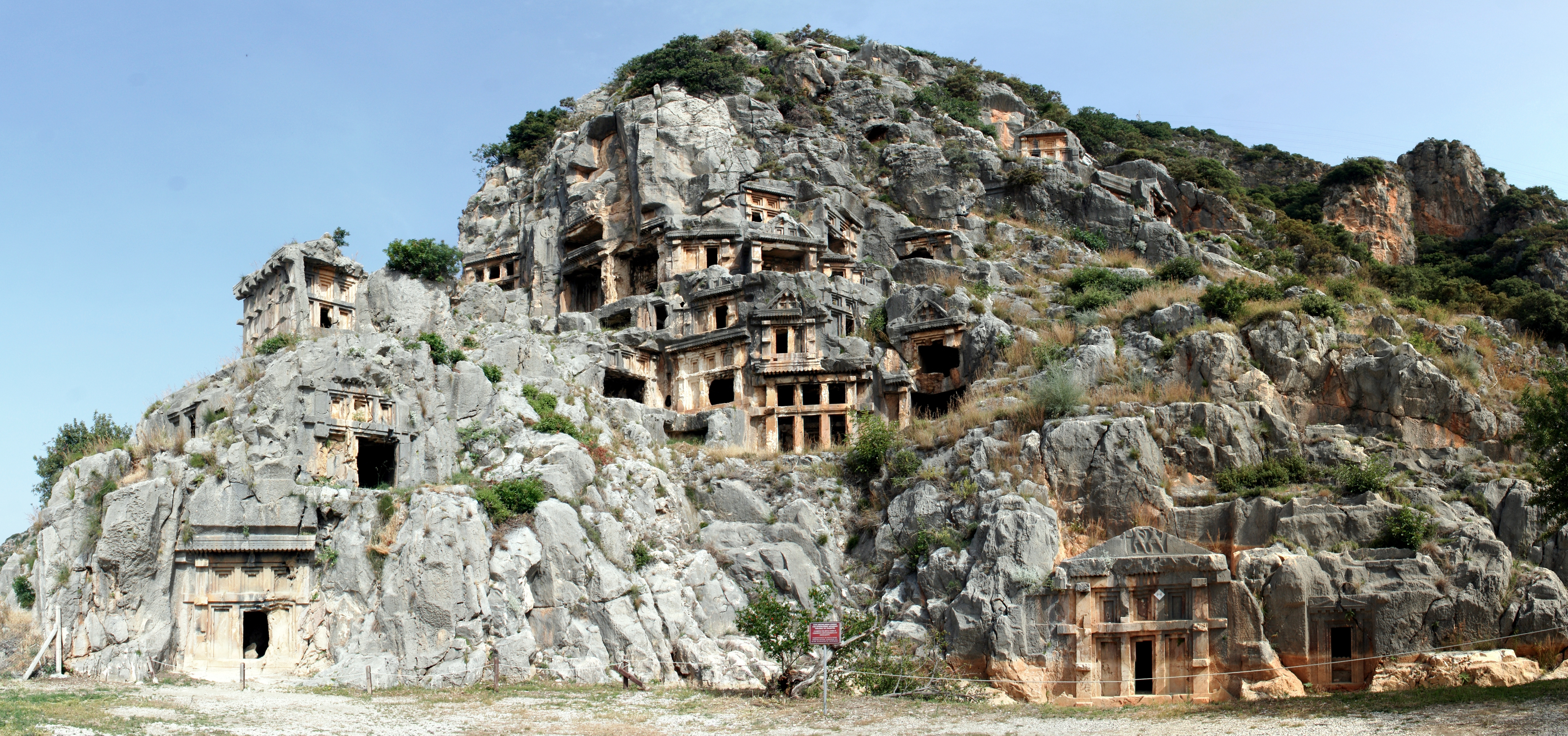
Rock-cut tombs in Myra

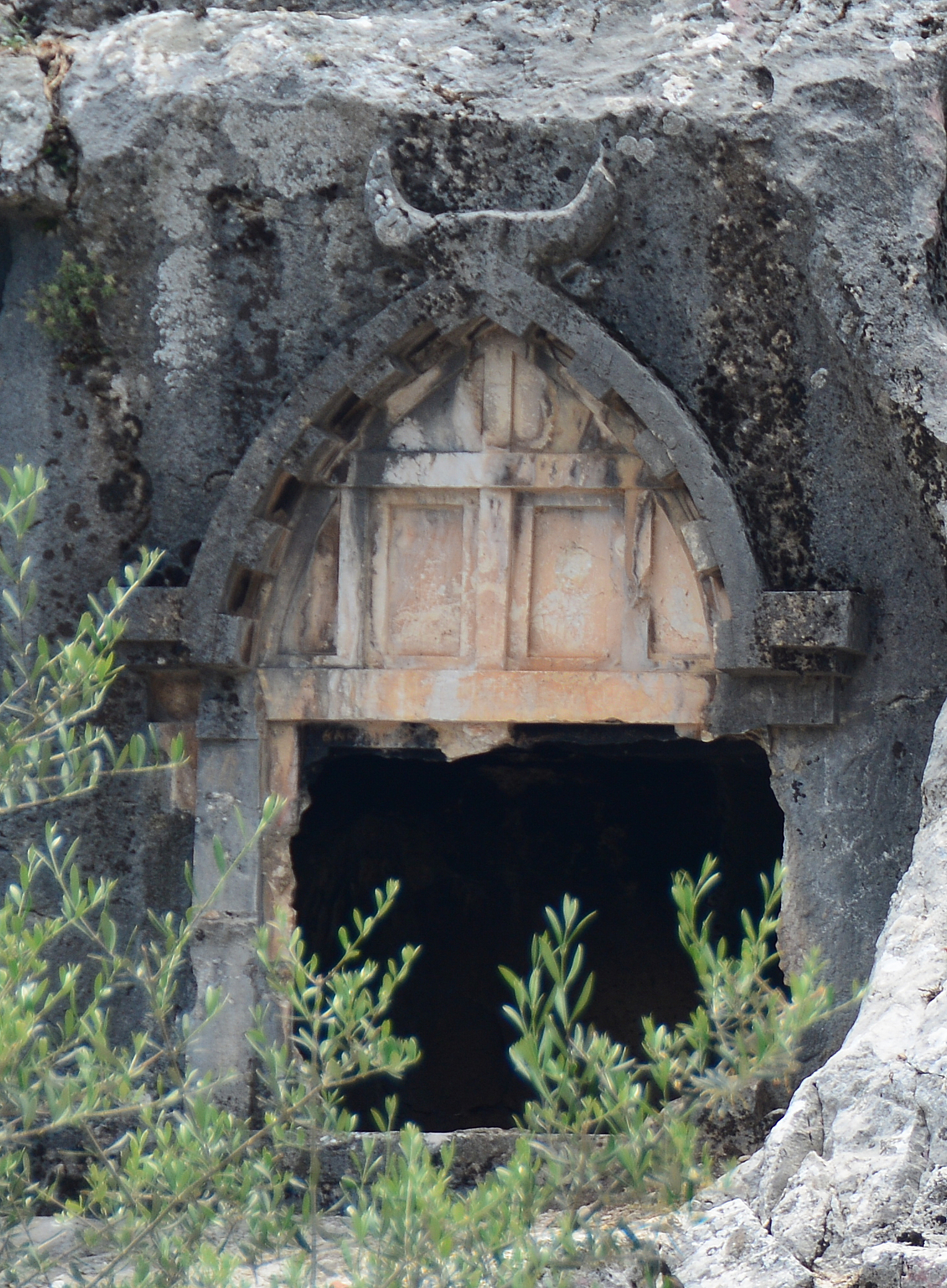
Ogival rock-cut tomb at Pinara, 4th century BC

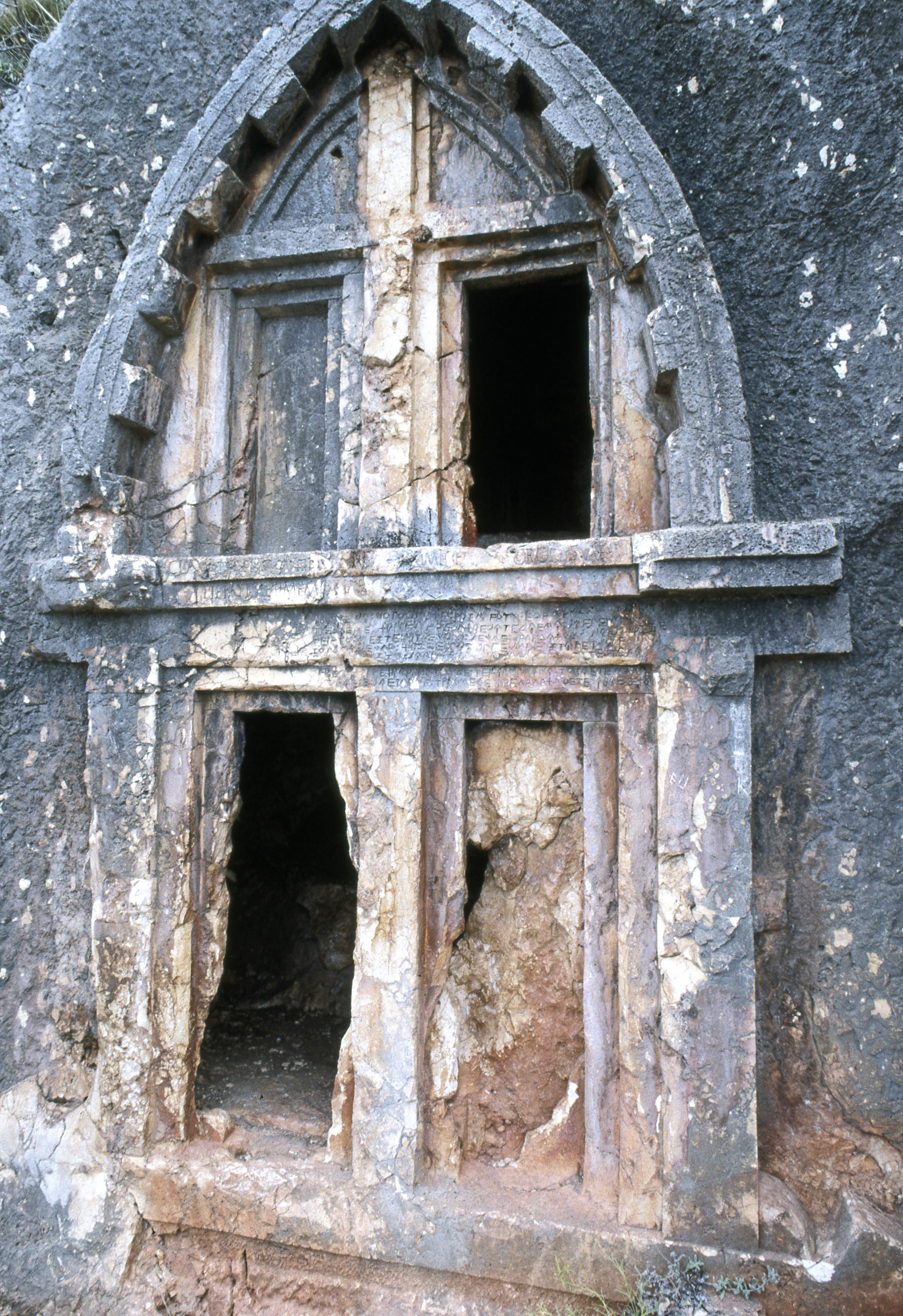
Ancient Lycian tomb in Kaş

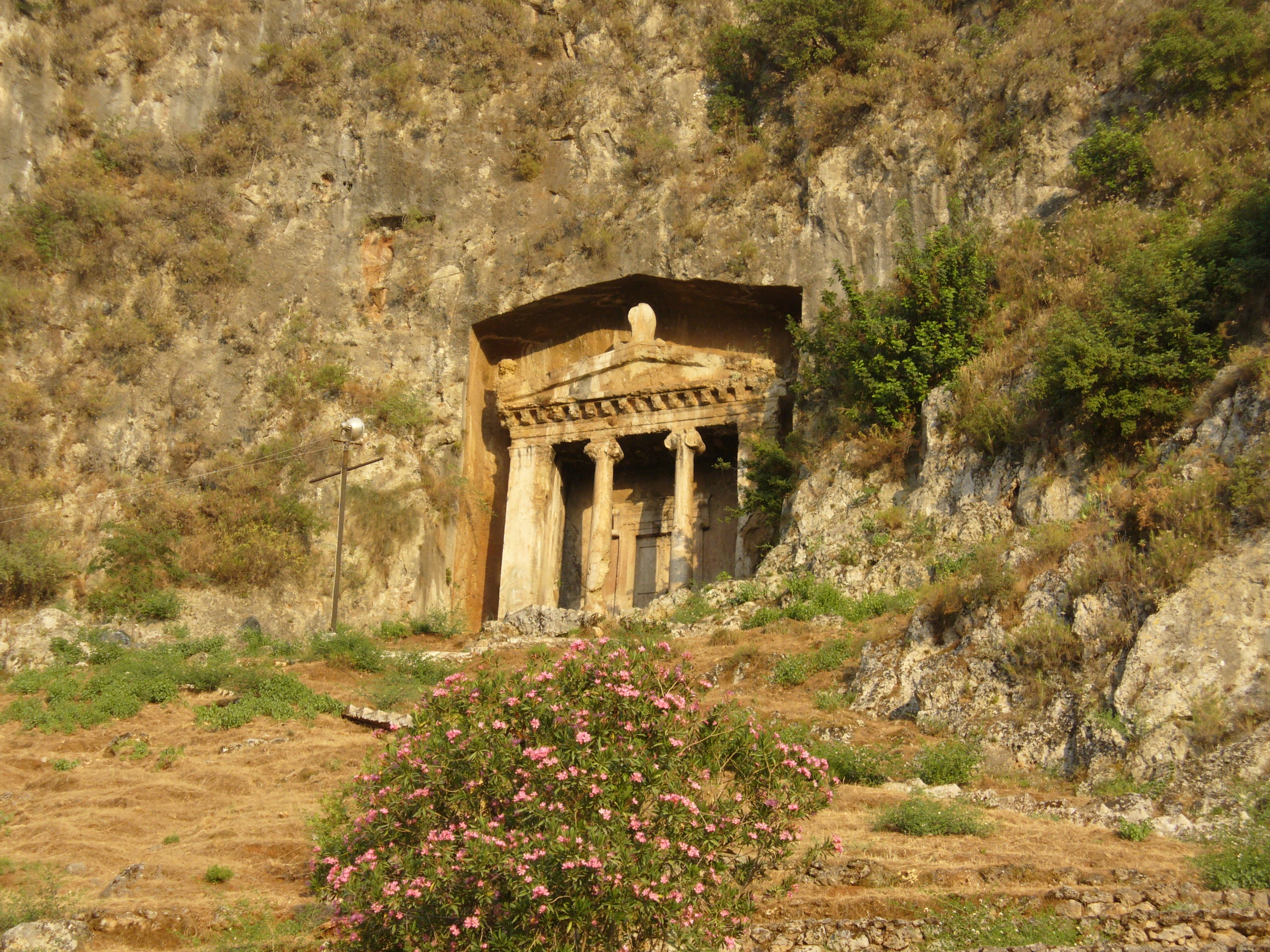
The Tomb of Amyntas in Fethiye

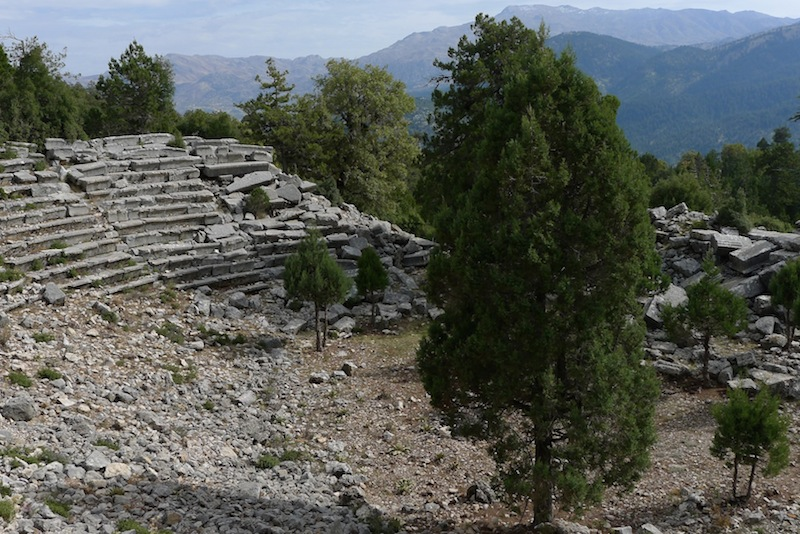
Ancient Greek theater at Oinoanda

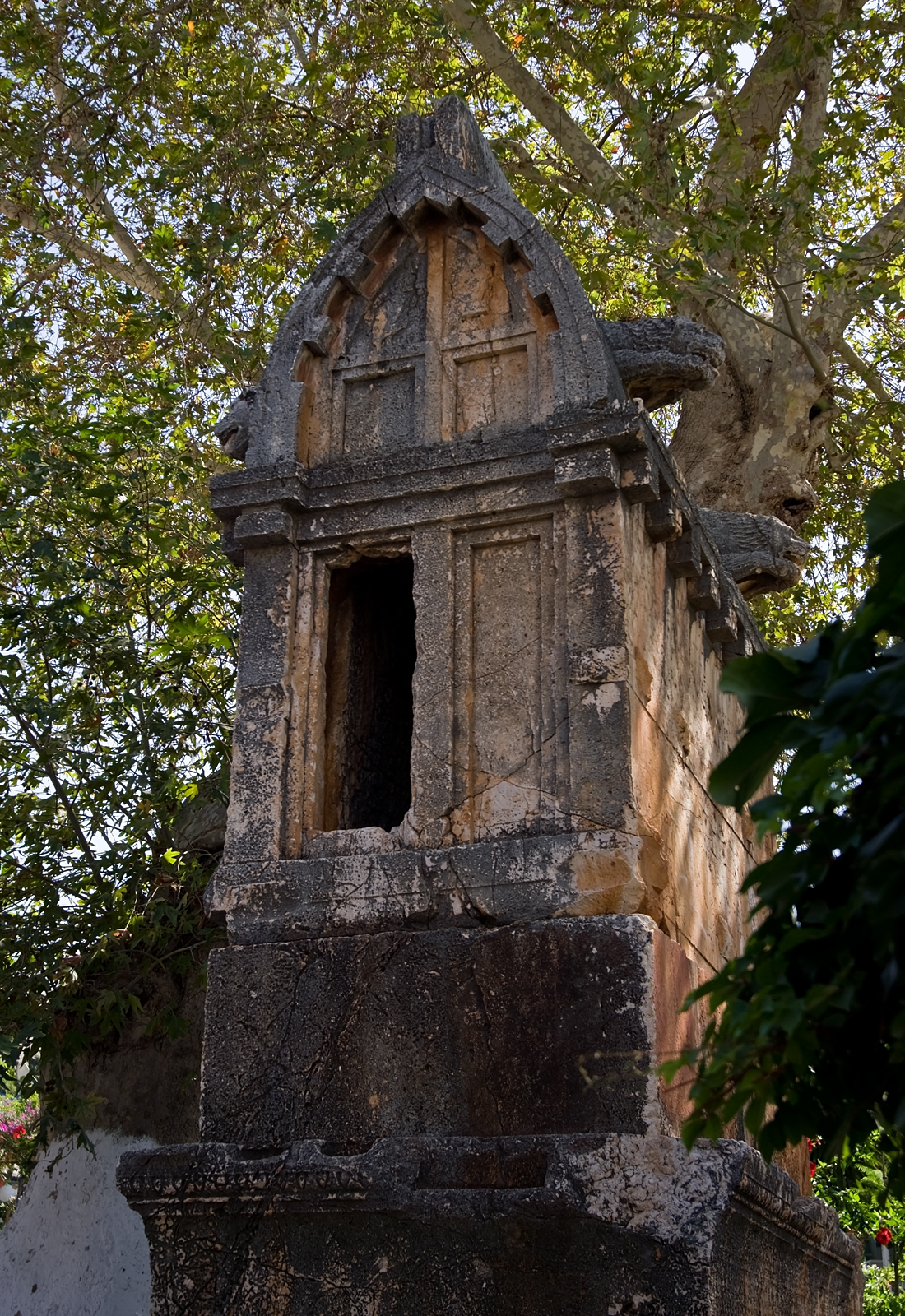
Lycian tomb in Kaş

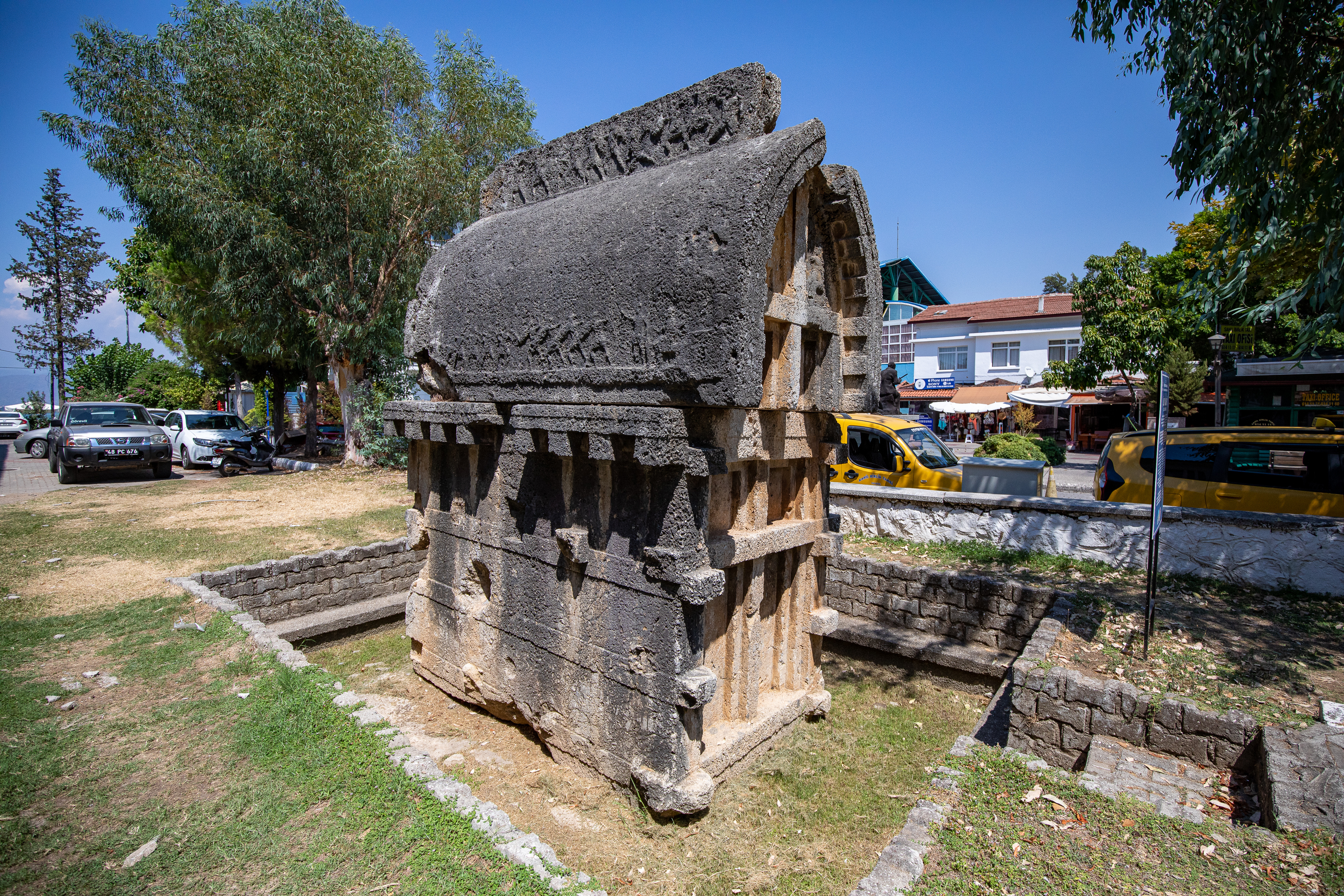
Lycian tomb in Fethiye

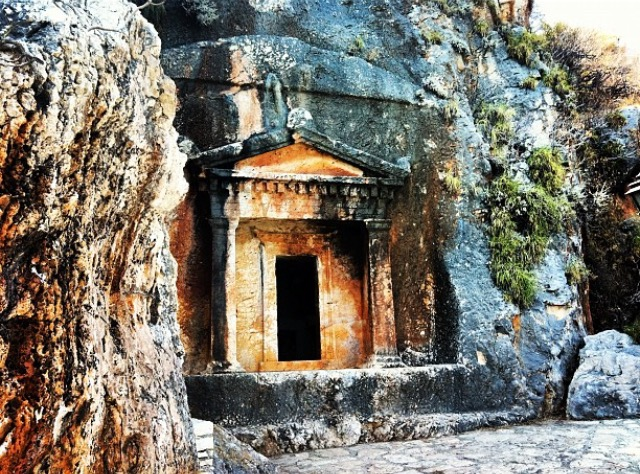
Lycian tomb in Kastellorizo

== Ancient language ==
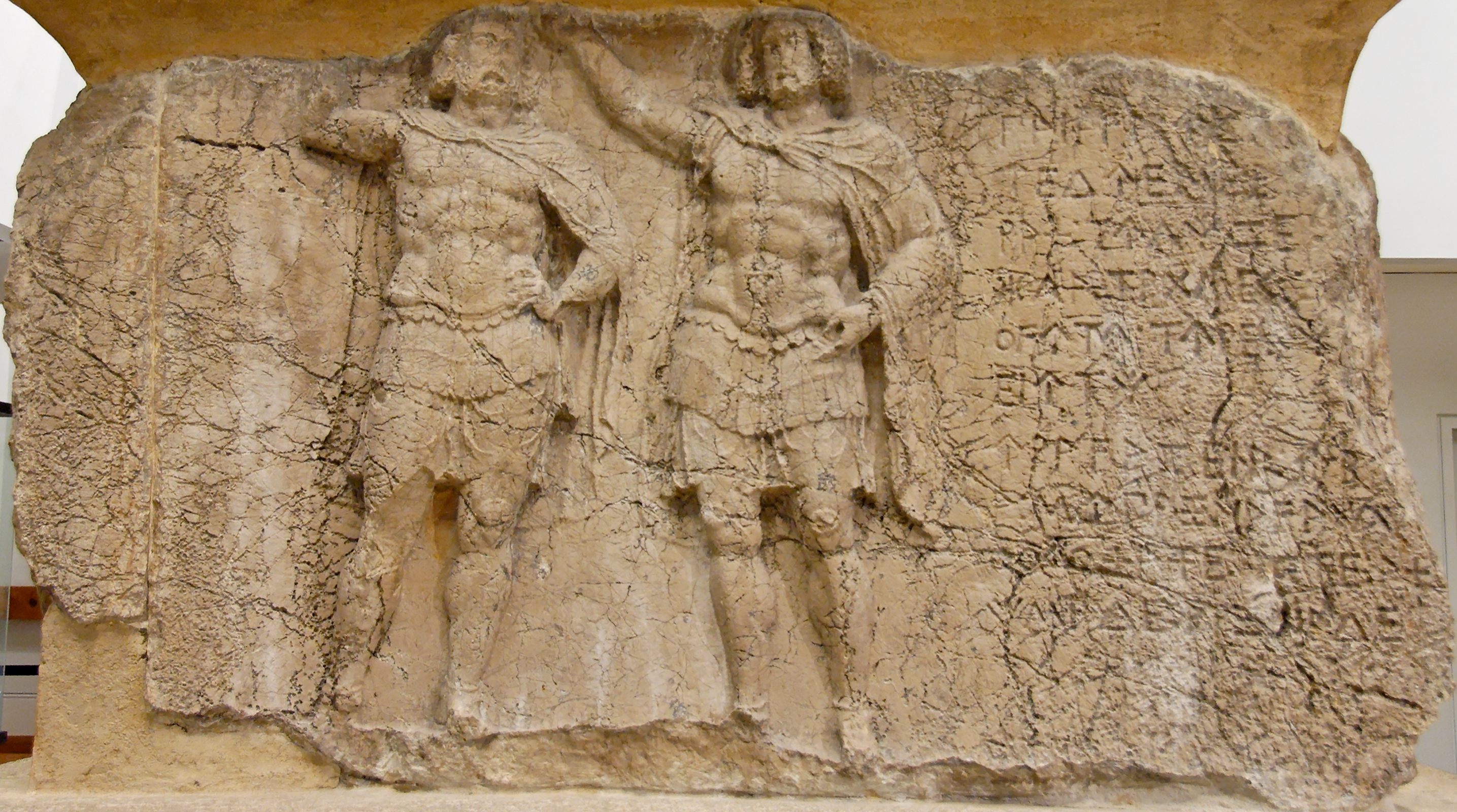
The Lycian Payava as depicted on his tomb, with inscription.

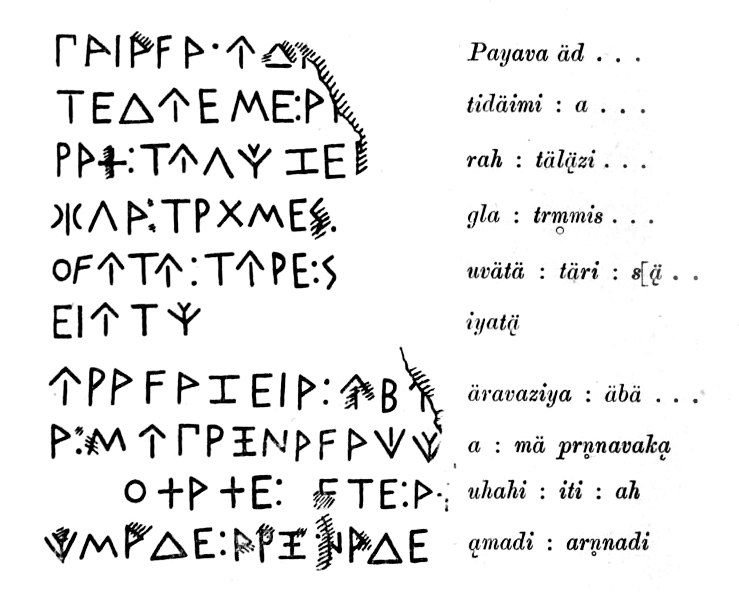
The inscription on the front of the tomb of Payava.

The Lydian inscription runs: "Payava, son of Ed[...], acquired [this grave] in the sacred [burial] area of the acropolis(?) of A[rttumba]ra (a Lycian ruler), when Lycia saw(?) S[alas](??) [as governor(?)]. This tomb I made, a 10 year iti (project?), by means of Xanthian ahamas." 375–360 BC.

The eponymous inhabitants of Lycia, the Lycians, spoke Lycian, a member of the Luwian branch of the Anatolian languages, a subfamily of the Indo-European family. Lycian has been attested only between about 500 BC and no later than 300 BC, in a unique alphabet devised for the purpose from the Greek alphabet of Rhodes. However, the Luwian languages originated in Anatolia during the 2nd millennium BC. The country was known by the name of Lukka then, and was sometimes under Hittite rule.

At about 535 BC, before the first appearance of attested Lycian, the Achaemenid Empire overran Lycia. Despite its resistance, because of which the population of Xanthos was decimated, Lycia became part of the Persian Empire. The first coins with Lycian letters on them appeared not long before 500 BC. Lycia prospered under a monarchy set up by the Persians. Subsequently, the Lycians were verbose in stone, carving memorial, historical and governmental inscriptions. Not all of these can yet be entirely understood, due to remaining ignorance of the language. The term "dynastic period" is used. If the government was any sort of federal democracy, there is no evidence of it, as the term "dynastic" suggests.

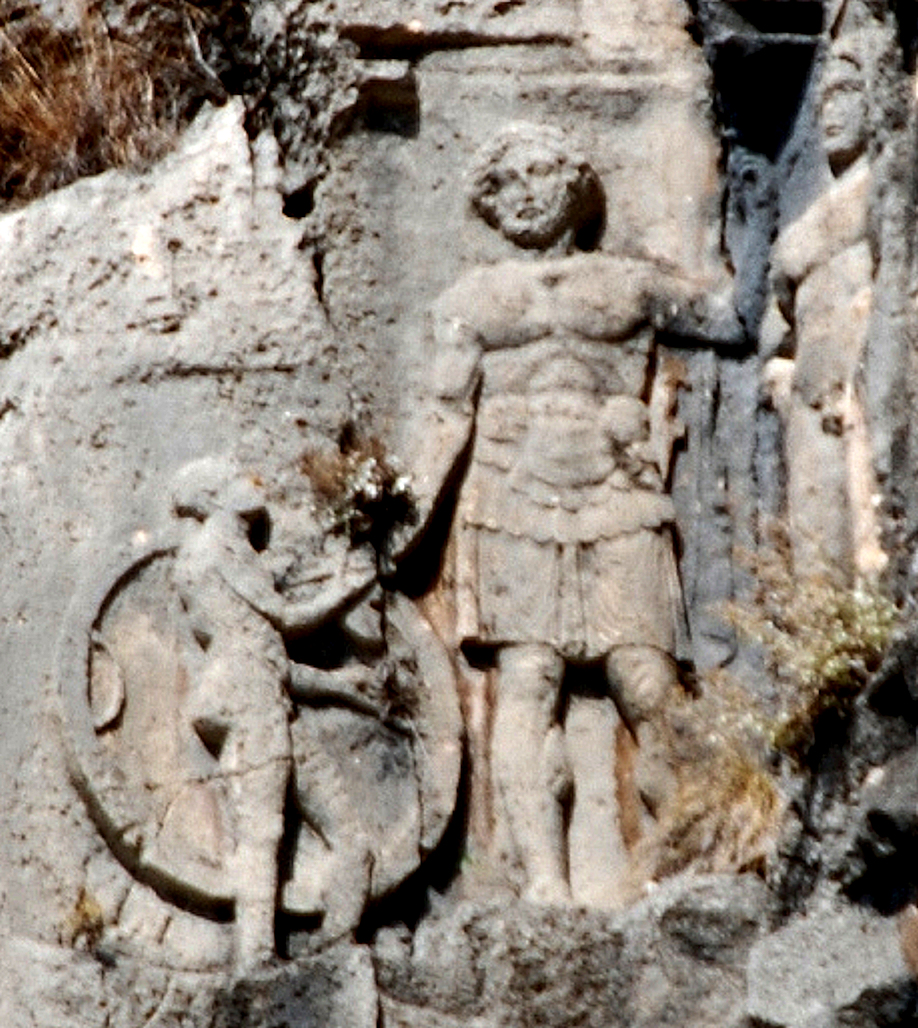
Warrior in Lycian tomb relief at Myra, 4th century BC.

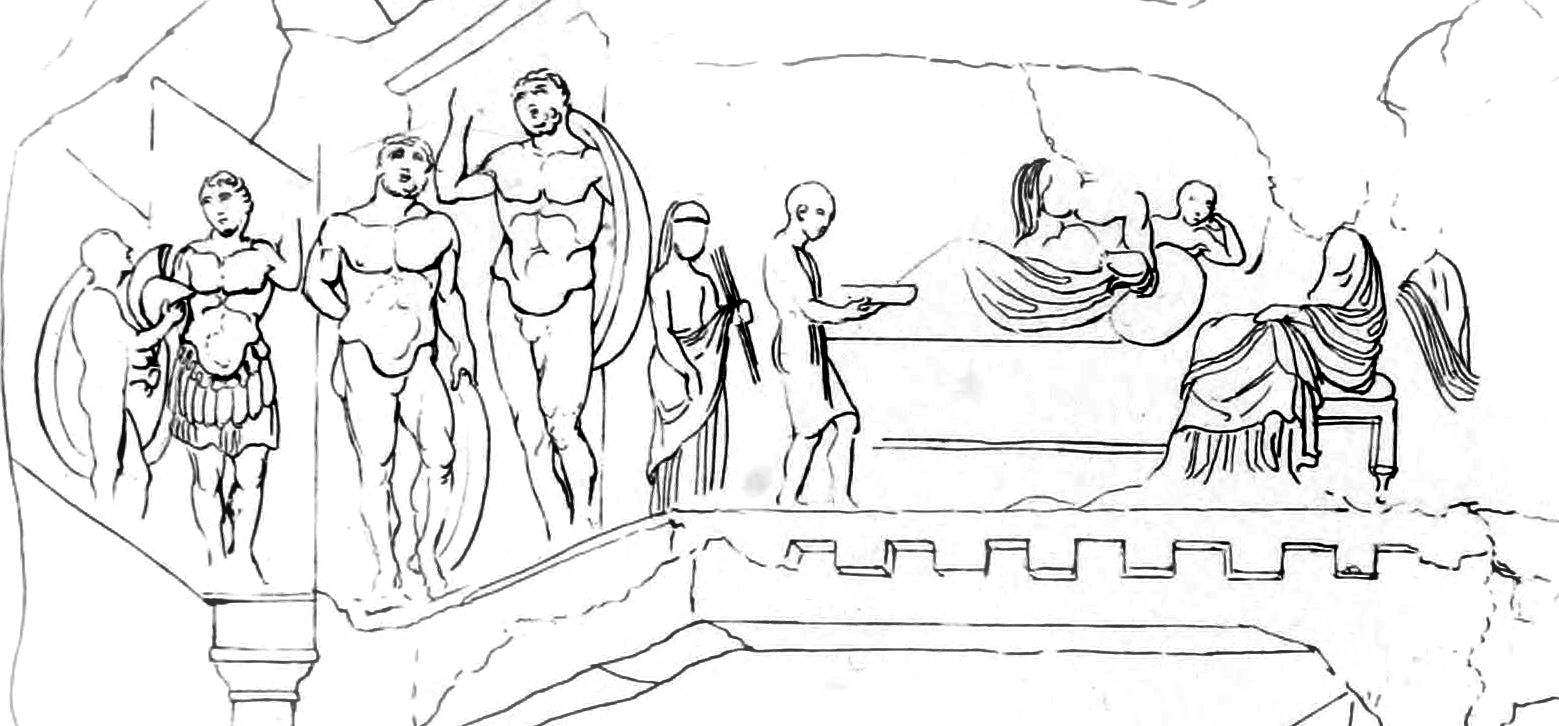
Drawing of the complete tomb relief, Myra.

Lycia hosted a small enclave of Dorian Greeks for some centuries and Rhodes was mainly inhabited by Dorians at the time. After the defeat of the Persians by the Greeks, Lycia became open to further Greek settlement. During this period, inscriptions in Lycian diminished, while those in Greek multiplied. Complete assimilation to Greek occurred sometime in the 4th century, after Lycia had come under the control of Alexander the Great and his fellow Macedonians. There is no agreement yet on which inscription in the Lycian language is the very last, but nothing dated after the year 300 BC has yet been found.

Subsequently, the Lycians were vassalized by the Roman Republic, which allowed the Lycians home rule under their own language, which at that point was Greek. Lycia continued to exist as a vassal state under the Roman Empire until its final division after the death of Theodosius I at which point it became a part of the Byzantine Empire under Arcadius. After the fall of the Byzantines in the 15th century, Lycia fell under the control of the Ottoman Empire; Turkish colonization of the area soon followed. Turkish and Greek settlements existed side-by-side, each speaking their own language.

All Greek-speaking enclaves in Anatolia were exchanged for Turkish speakers in Greece during the final settlement of the border with Greece at the beginning of the Turkish Republic in 1923. The Turks had won wars against both Greece and Armenia in the preceding few years, settling the issue of whether the coast of Anatolia was going to be Greek or Turkish. The intent of the Treaty of Lausanne (1923) was to define borders that would not leave substantial populations of one country in another. Some population transfers were enforced. Former Greek villages still stand as ghost towns in Lycia.

== History ==
=== Bronze Age ===
During the Late Bronze Age, Lycia was part of the Lukka lands known from Hittite and ancient Egyptian records. The toponyms Lukka and Lycia are believed to be cognate, as are the names of numerous Lukkan and Lycian settlements.

The Lukka lands were never a unified kingdom, instead having a decentralized political structure. Archaeological remains of the Lukka people are sparse. The Lukka people were famously fractious, with Hittite and Egyptian records describing them as raiders, rebels, and pirates. Lukka people fought against the Hittites as part of the Assuwa confederation, later fought for the Hittites in the Battle of Kadesh, and are listed among the groups known to modern scholars as the Sea People.

=== Dynastic period ===
==== Acquisition by Cyrus the Great (circa 540 BC) ====
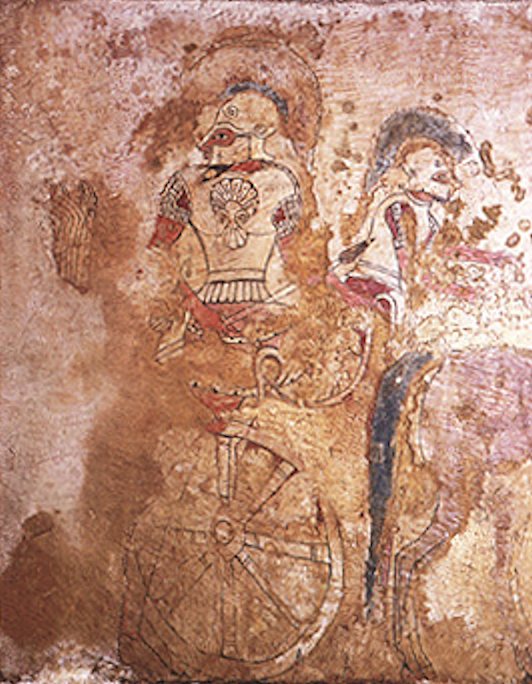
Charioteers on a tomb at Kizilbel near Elmali, Lycia, c. 525 BC

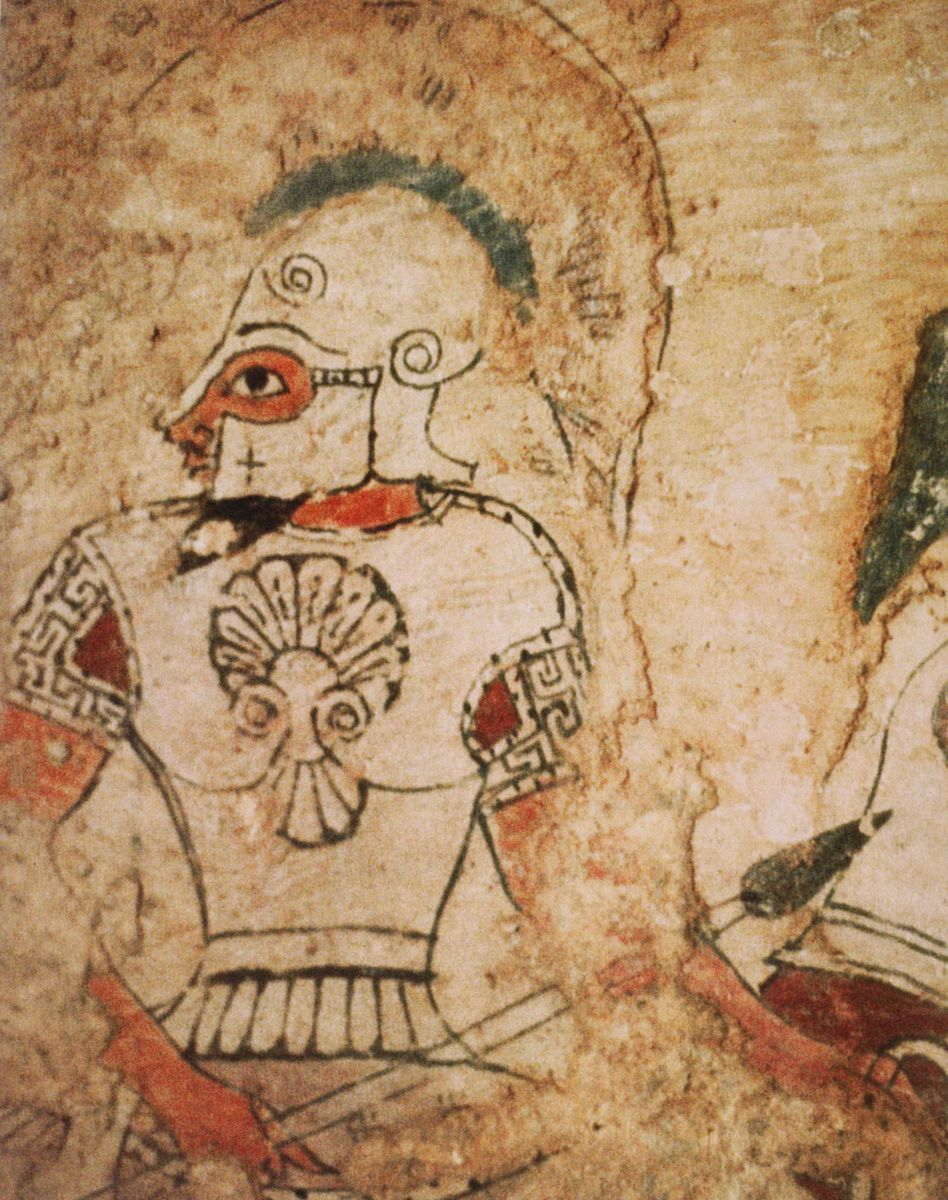
Detail of the frescoe: Lycian warrior painted in Archaic Greek style.

Herodotus writes more credibly of contemporaneous events, especially where they concerned his native land. Asia Minor had been partly conquered by Iranian peoples, first the Scythians, later the Medes. The latter were defeated by the Persians, who incorporated them and their lands into the new Persian Empire. Cyrus the Great, founder of the Achaemenid dynasty, resolved to complete the conquest of Anatolia as a prelude to operations further west, to be carried out by his successors. He assigned the task to Harpagus, a Median general, who proceeded to subdue the various states of Anatolia, one by one, some by convincing them to submit, others through military action.

Arriving at the southern coast of Anatolia in 546 BC, the army of Harpagus encountered no problem with the Carians and their immediate Greek neighbors and alien populations, who submitted peacefully. In the Xanthos Valley an army of Xanthian Greeks sallied out to meet them, fighting determinedly, although vastly outnumbered. Driven into the citadel, they collected all their property, dependents and slaves into a central building, and burned them up. Then, after taking an oath not to surrender, they died to a man fighting the Persians, foreshadowing and perhaps setting an example for Spartan conduct at the Battle of Thermopylae a few generations later.

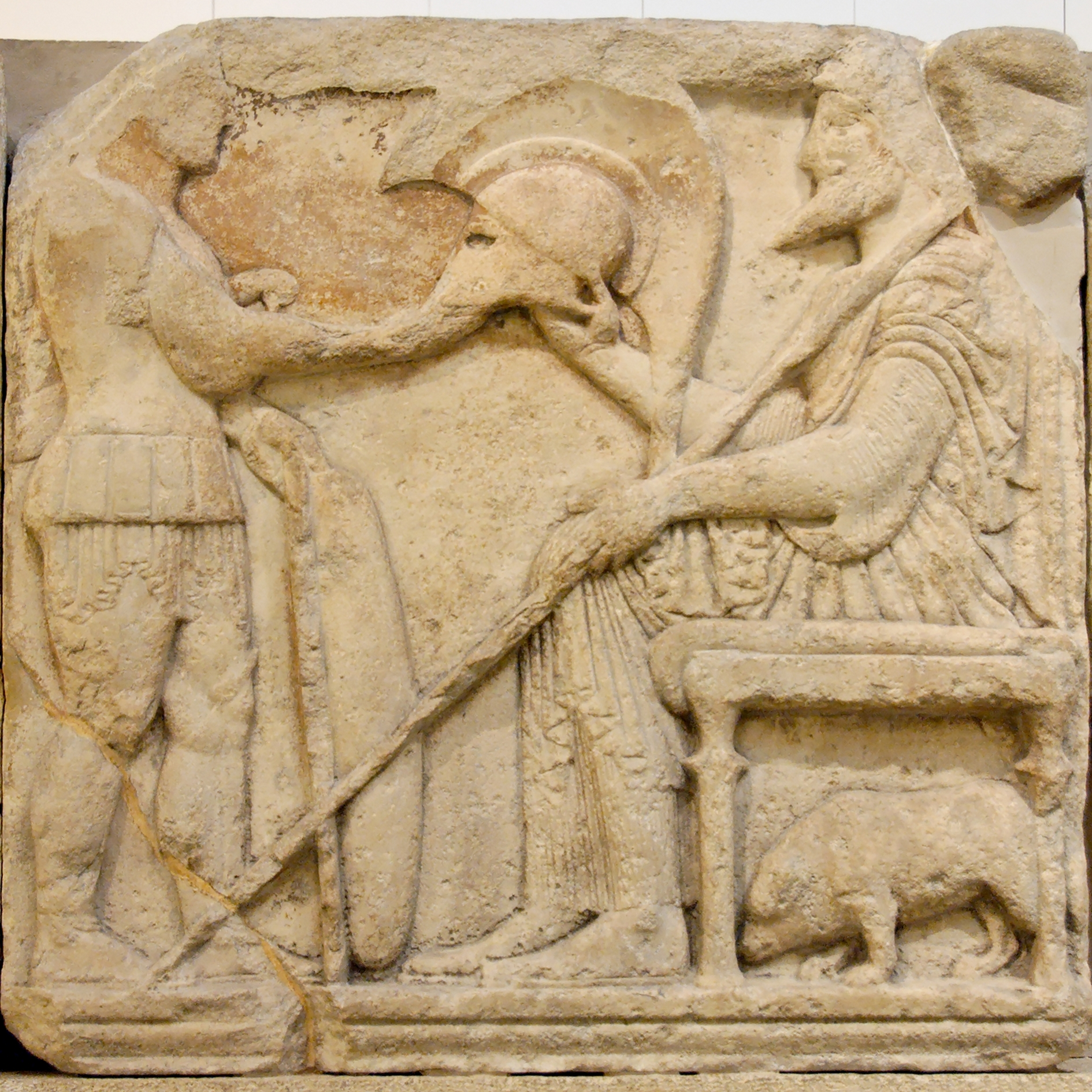
Probable depiction of the Lycian ruler Kybernis (520–480 BC), Harpy Tomb. Archaic Greek style.

Archaeological evidence indicates there was a major fire on the acropolis of Xanthos in the mid-6th century BC but, as Antony Keen points out, there is no way to connect that fire with the event presented by Herodotus. It might have been another fire. The Caunians, says Herodotus, followed a similar example immediately after. If there was an attempt by any of the states of Lycia to join forces, as happened in Greece 50 years later, there is no record of it, suggesting that no central government existed. Each country awaited its own fate alone.

Herodotus also says or implies that 80 Xanthian families were away at the time, perhaps with the herd animals in alpine summer pastures (pure speculation), but helped repopulate the place. However, he reports, the Xanthians of his time were mainly descended from non-Xanthians. Looking for any nuance that might shed light on the repopulation of Xanthos, Keen interprets Herodotus' "those Lycians who now say that they are Xanthians" to mean that Xanthos was repopulated by other Lycians (and not by Iranians or other foreigners). Herodotus said nothing of the remainder of Lycia; presumably, that is true because they submitted without further incident. Lycia was well populated and flourished as a Persian satrapy; moreover, they spoke mainly Lycian.

==== The Harpagid theory ====
The Harpagid Theory was initiated by Charles Fellows, discoverer of the Xanthian Obelisk, and person responsible for the transportation of the Xanthian Marbles from Lycia to the British Museum. Fellows could not read the Lycian inscription, except for one line identifying a person of illegible name, to whom the monument was erected, termed the son of Arppakhu in Lycian, equivalent to Greek Harpagos. Concluding that this person was the conqueror of Lycia in 546, Fellows conjectured that Harpagos had been made permanent satrap of Lycia for his services; moreover, the position was hereditary, creating a Harpagid Dynasty. This theory prevailed nearly without question for several generations.

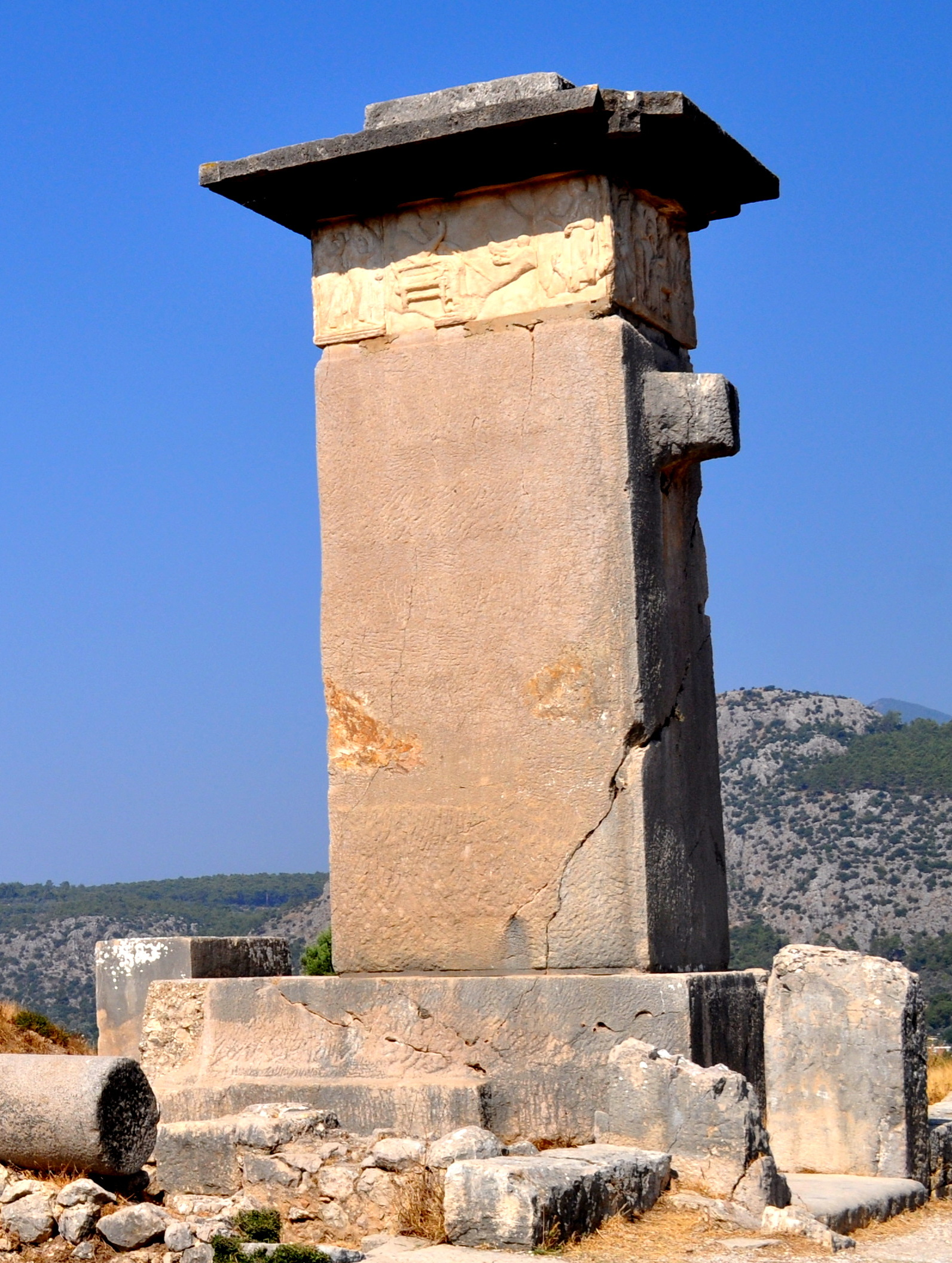
The "Harpy Tomb" of Kybernis, a solid sandstone pillar with the sarcophagus of Kybernis on top (c. 480 BC).

To the inscriptions of the Xanthian Obelisk were added those of the Letoon trilingual, which gave a sequel, as it were, to the names on the obelisk. Studies of coin legends, initiated by Fellows, went on. Currently, most (but not all) of the Harpagid Theory has been rejected. The Achaemenids utilized no permanent satrapies; the political circumstances changed too often. The conqueror of new lands was seldom made their satrap; he went on to other conquests. It was not the Persian custom to grant hereditary satrapies; satrap was only a step in the cursus honorum. And finally, a destitute mountain country would have been a poor reward for Cyrus' best general. The main evidence against the Harpagid Theory (as Keen calls it) is the reconstruction of the name of the Xanthian Obelisk's deceased as Lycian Kheriga, Greek Gergis (Nereid Monument), a king reigning approximately 440–410 BC, over a century later than the conqueror of Lycia.

The next logical possibility is that Kheriga's father, Arppakhu, was a descendant of the conqueror. In opposition, Keen reconstructs the dynastic sequence from coin inscriptions as follows. Kheriga had two grandfathers, Kuprlli and Kheriga. The younger Kheriga was the successor of Kuprlli. The latter's son, therefore, Kheziga, who was Kheriga's uncle, must have predeceased Kuprlli. Arppakhu is listed as regnant on two other inscriptions, but he did not succeed Kuprlli. He must therefore have married a daughter of Kuprlli, and have also predeceased the long-lived Kuprlli. The latter then was too old to reign de facto. On the contemporaneous deaths of both him and his son-in-law, Kheriga, named after his paternal grandfather, acquired the throne.

Kuprlli was the first king recorded for certain (there was an earlier possible) in the coin legends. He reigned approximately 480–440. Harpagos was not related by blood. The conqueror, therefore, was not the founder of the line, which was not Harpagid. An Iranian family, however, producing some other Harpagids, did live in Lycia and was of sufficient rank to marry the king's daughter. As to whether the Iranian family were related to any satrap, probably not. Herodotus said that Satrapy 1 (the satrapies were numbered) consisted of Ionia, Magnesia, Aeolia, Caria, Lycia, Milya, and Pamphylia, who together paid a tax of 400 silver talents. This satrapy was later broken up and recombined. Keen hypothesizes that since Caria had responsibility for the King's Highway through Lycia, Lycia and Caria were a satrapy.

==== The Lycian monarchy ====
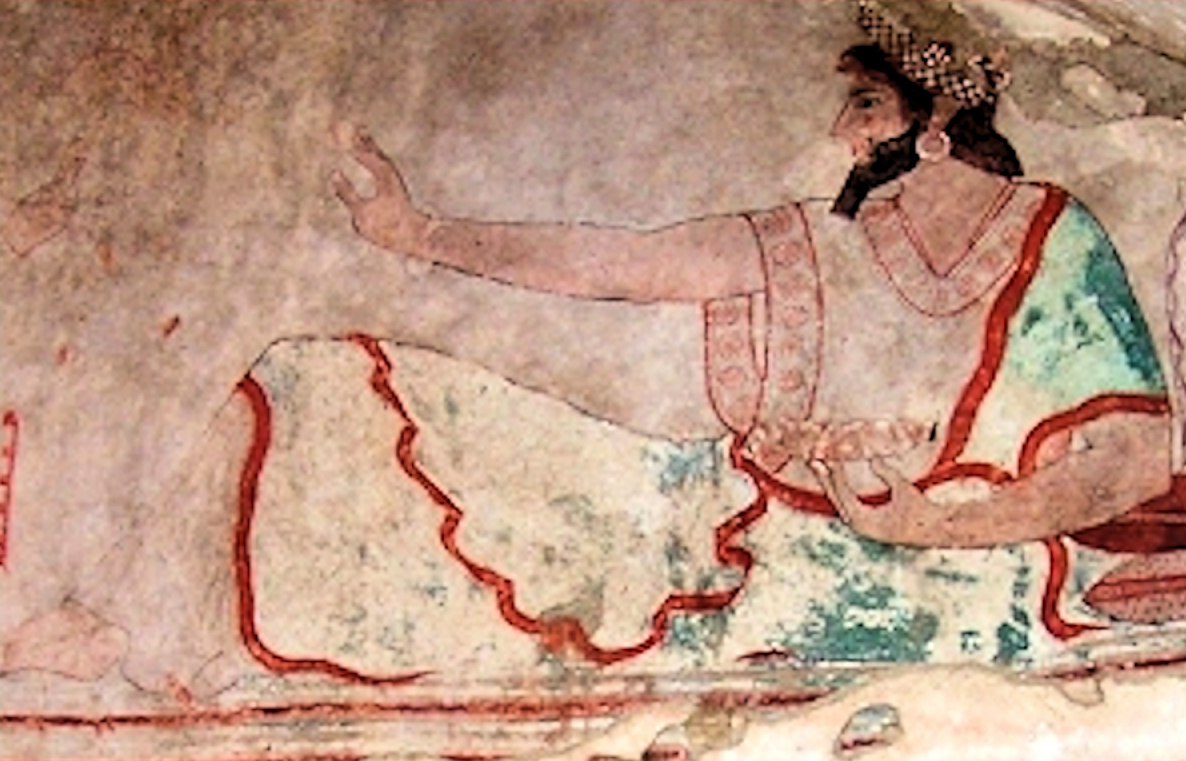
Lycian dignitary in Achaemenid style, at the Karaburun tomb near Elmalı, Lycia, c. 475 BC.

The Achaemenid Persian policy toward Lycia was hands-off. There was not even a satrap stationed in the country. The reason for this tolerance after such a determined initial resistance is that the Iranians were utilizing another method of control: the placement of aristocratic Persian families in a region to exercise putative home rule. There is some evidence that the Lycian population was not as docile as the Persian hand-off policy would suggest. A section of the Persepolis Administrative Archives called the Persepolis Fortification Tablets, regarding the redistribution of goods and services in the Persepolis palace economy, mentions some redistributed prisoners of war, among whom were the Turmirla or Turmirliya, Lycian Trm̃mili, "Lycians." They lived during the reign of Darius I (522–486), the tablets dating from 509.

Ogival tombs

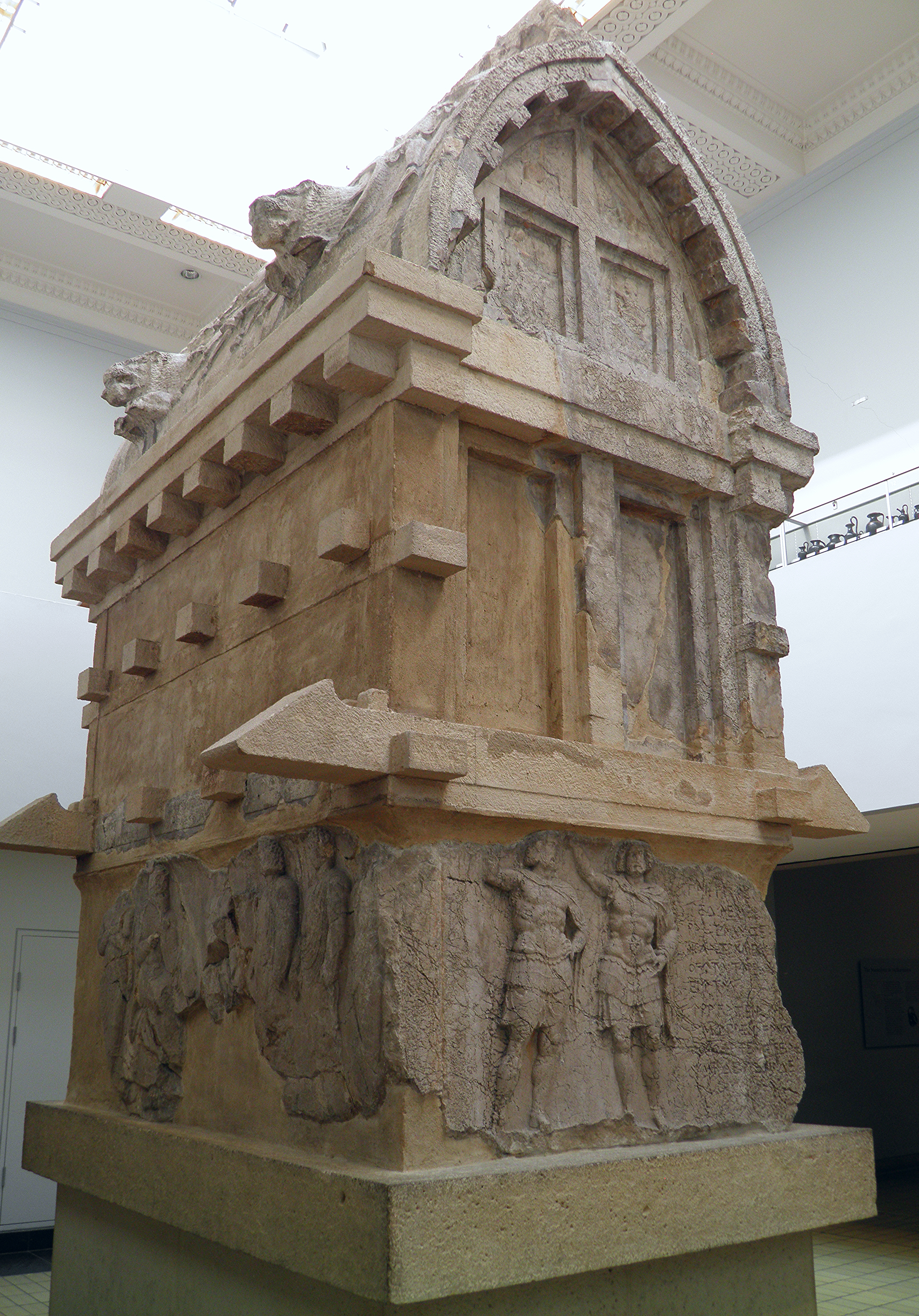
The tomb of Payava, a Lykian aristocrat, about 375–360 BC, from Xanthos, British Museum.

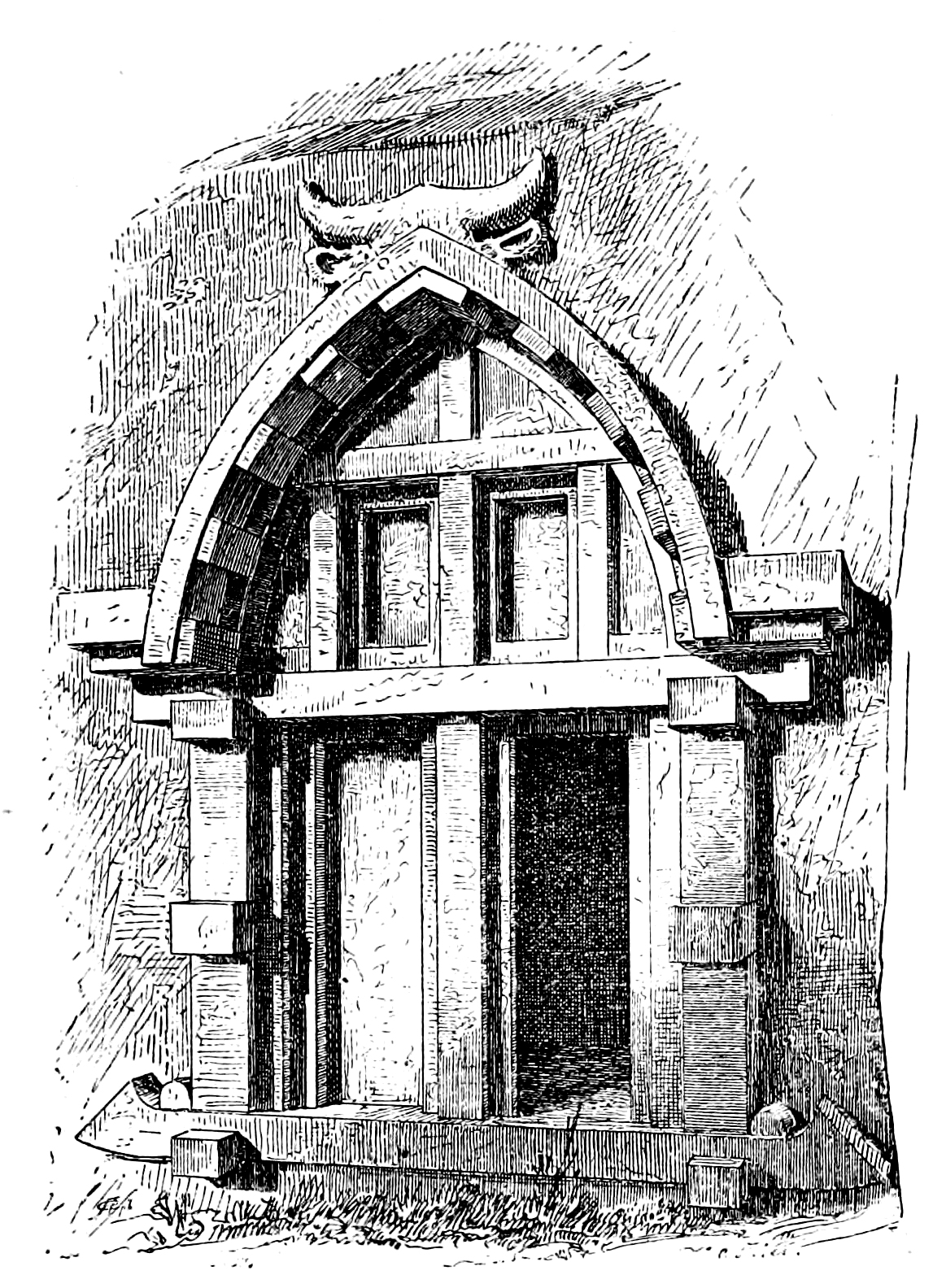
Ogival (pointed barrel-vaulted) rock-cut tomb at Pinara, Lycia, highly reminiscent of Indian Chaitya arches.

For closer attention to their conquered, the Persian government preferred to establish a client state, setting up a monarchy under their control. The term "dynast" has come into use among English-speaking scholars, but that is not a native term. The Lycian inscriptions indicate the monarch was titled xñtawati, more phonetically khñtawati. The holders of this title can be traced in coin legends, having been given the right to coin. Lycia had a single monarch, who ruled the entire country from a palace at Xanthos. The monarchy was hereditary, hence the term "dynast." It was utilized by Persia as a means of transmitting Persian policy. It must have been they who put down local resistance and transported the prisoners to Persepolis, or ordered them transported. Some members of the dynasty were Iranian, but mainly it was native Lycian. If the survivors of 546 were in fact herdsmen (speculation), then all the Xanthian nobility had perished, and the Persians must have designated some other Lycian noble, whom they could trust.

The first dynast is believed to be the person mentioned in the last line of the Greek epigram inscribed on the Xanthian Obelisk, which says "this monument has brought glory to the family (genos) of ka[]ika," which has a letter missing. It is probably not *karikas, for Kherika, as the latter is translated in the Letoon trilingual as Gergis. A more likely possibility is *kasikas for Kheziga, the same as Kheriga's uncle, the successor to Kuprlli, who predeceased him.

Herodotus mentioned that the leader of the Lycian fleet under Xerxes in the Second Persian War of 480 BC was Kuberniskos Sika, previously interpreted as "Cyberniscus, the son of Sicas," two non-Lycian names. A slight regrouping of the letters obtains kubernis kosika, "Cybernis, son of Cosicas," where Cosicas is for Kheziga. Cybernis went to the bottom of the Straits of Salamis with the entire Lycian fleet in the Battle of Salamis, but he may be commemorated by the Harpy Tomb. According to this theory, Cybernis was the KUB of the first coin legends, dated to the window, 520–500. The date would have been more towards 500.

There is a gap, however, between him and Kuprlli, who should have had a father named the same as his son, Kheziga. The name Kubernis does not appear again. Keen suggests that Darius I created the kingship on reorganizing the satrapies in 525, and that on the intestate death of Kubernis in battle, the Persians chose another relative named Kheziga, who was the father of Kuprlli. The Lycian dynasty may therefore be summarized as follows:

Greek Name	Lycian "Kings" (at Xanthos)	Local Lycian rulers	Coinage	Status	Date BC
Pre-dynastic period (c.540–c.530 BC)				Initial Achaemenid control since circa 542/539 BC.	c.540–c.530
Kosikas	Kheziga I			First of the line.	c.525
Kubernis	KUB			Second in succession, son of the former.	c.520–480
Kosikas		Kheziga II		Third in succession, unknown relative (possibly son of Kheziga I ?).	fl. c.500
?	Kuprlli (ΚΟ𐊓, pronounced "coupe")			Kuprlli, son of Kheziga II, was fourth in succession. First monarch identifiable through coin legends.	480–c.440
?	Kuprlli (ΚΟ𐊓, pronounced "coupe")	During Kuprlli's long reign at least a dozen local Lycian rulers started to mint their own coins, among them Teththiweibi:			
?	Kuprlli (ΚΟ𐊓, pronounced "coupe")	Teththiweibi			c.450–430/20
Kosikas	(Kheziga III: heir-apparent)			Son of Kuprlli, first in line to succeed him, but died young.	† c.460
Harpagus (Iranian name)	(Arppakhu: regent for Kuprlli)			Son-in-law of Kuprlli. The elderly Kuprlli, when he became incapacitated, remained nominal king, but real power rested with Arpakkhu as his regent.	fl. c.450
Gergis	Kheriga			Fifth in succession, son of Arppakhu. Probably regent for Kuprlli in his last years, after his death Kheriga became king himself.	c.440-c.410
?	Kherei			Sixth in succession, brother of Kheriga.	c.410–c.390
Arbinas (Iranian name)	Erbbina			Seventh in succession, son of Kheriga. The last known of the line.	c.390–c.380
Artembares (Iranian name, *Rtambura, self-identified as "the Mede.")	Arttum̃para			Ruler of western Lycia from Telmessos. Ousted by Perikle.	c.380–c.360
Mithrapata		Mithrapata		Ruler in eastern Lycia.	c.390–c.370
Pericles (Greek name)	Perikle			At first ruler of eastern Lycia from Limyra, then victor over Arttum̃para, rebel in the Revolt of the Satraps, last Lycian king.	c.360

=== Classical period ===
==== Ally of Athens in the Delian League (c. 470–430 BC) ====
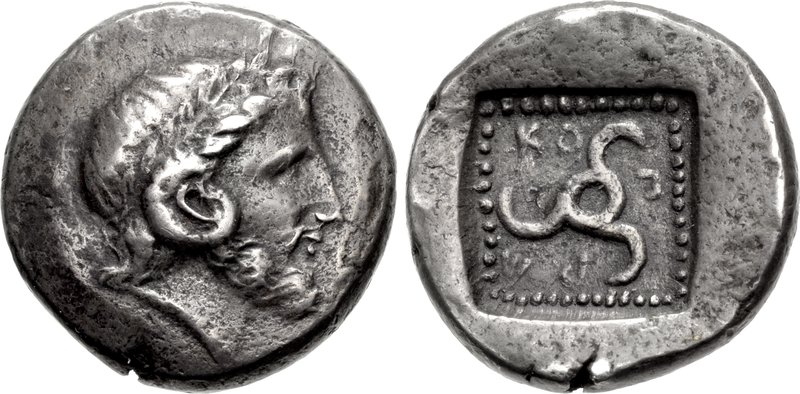
Kuprlli (480–440 BC) ruled at the time of the Athenian alliance. Head of Karneios or Zeus-Ammon and Triskeles. KO-𐊓-P(ΛΛE) around.

Following the Achaemenid defeat in the Greco-Persian War (479 BC), the Lycians may have temporarily joined the Greek side during the counter-attacks of the Spartan Pausanias in the Eastern Mediterranean circa 478 BC. However, the Lycian were still on the Persian side during the expeditions of Kimon circa 470 BC, who finally persuaded the Lycian to join the Athenian alliance, the Delian League: Diodorus relates that Kimon "persuaded those of Lycia and took them into his allegiance".

As the power of Athens weakened and Athens and Sparta fought the Peloponnesian Wars (431–404 BC), the majority of Lycian cities defaulted from the Delian League, with the exception of Telmessos and Phaselis. In 429 BC, Athens sent an expedition against Lycia to try to force it to rejoin the League. This failed when Lycia's leader Gergis/Kheriga of Xanthos defeated Athenian General Melesander.

==== Renewed Achaemenid control (c. 430–333 BC) ====
Stand-alone Temple-like tombs

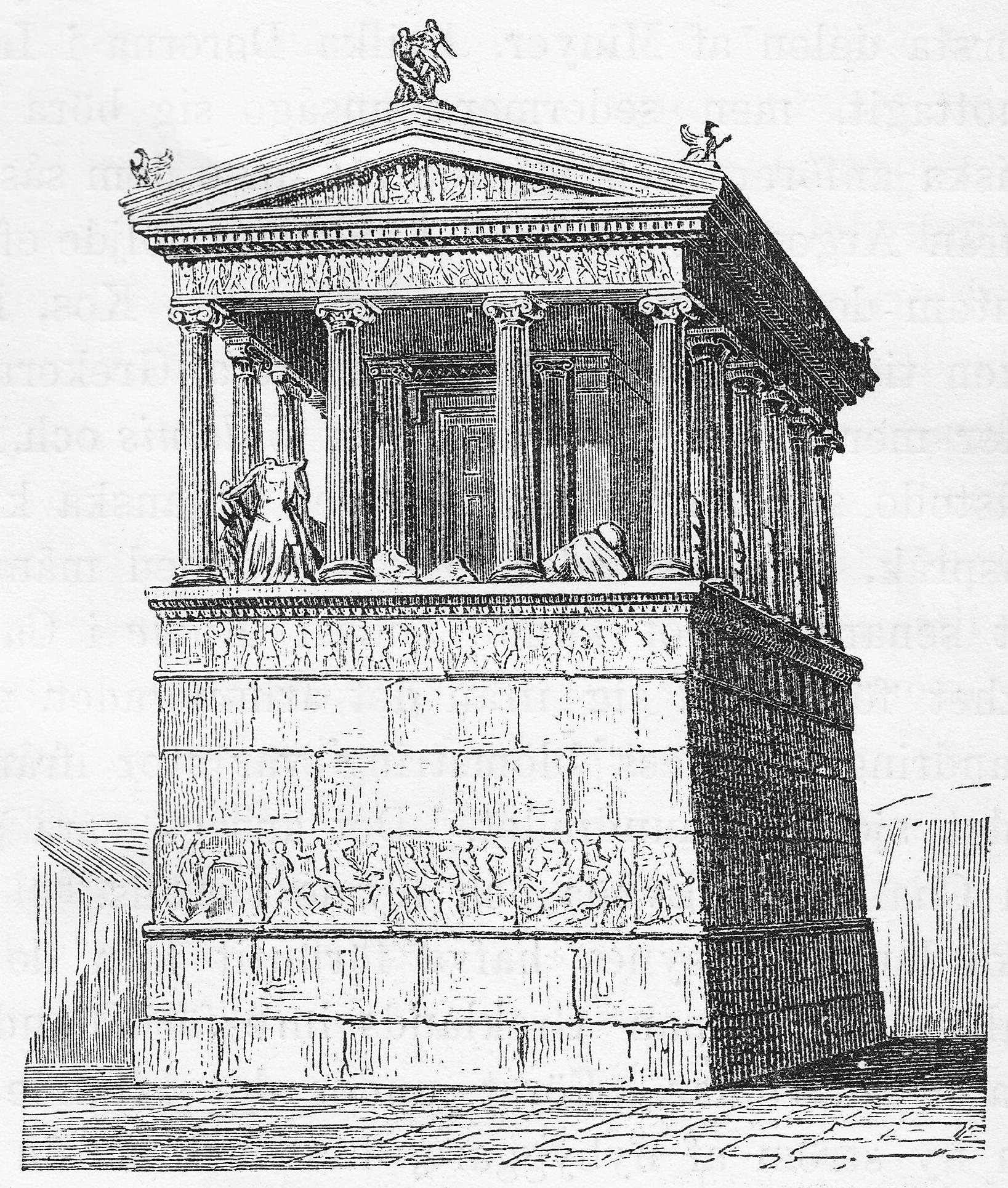
Illustration of the original Nereid Monument, tomb of King Arbinas.

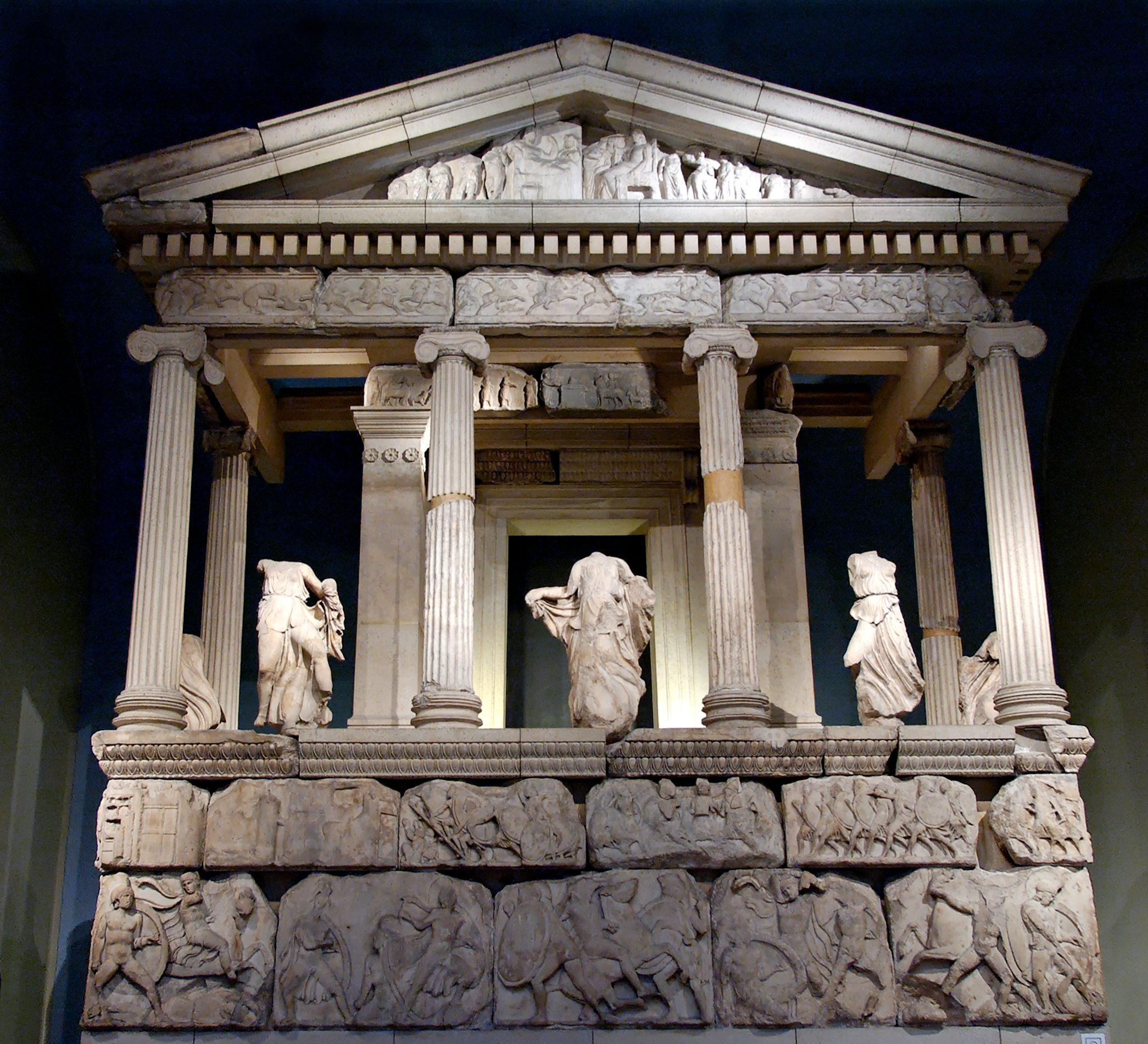
Reconstruction of the Nereid Monument, British Museum. This was a new "Greek Temple" type of tomb for Lycia, adopted circa 380 BC.

The Lycians once again fell under Persian domination, and by 412 BC, Lycia is documented as fighting on the winning side of Persia. The Persian satraps were re-installed, but (as the coinage of the time attests) they allowed local dynasts the freedom to rule.

The last known dynast of Lycia was Perikles. He ruled 380–360 BC over eastern Lycia from Limyra, at a time when Western Lycia was directly under Persian domination. Pericles took an active part in the Revolt of the Satraps against Achaemenid power, but lost his territory when defeated.

After Perikles, Persian rule was reestablished firmly in Lycia in 366 or 362 BC. Control was taken by Mausolus, the satrap of nearby Caria, who moved the satrap's residence to Halicarnassus. Lycia was also ruled directly by the Carian dynast Pixodarus, son of Hecatomnus, as shown in the Xanthos trilingual inscription.

Lycia was also ruled by men such as Mithrapata (late 4th century BC), whose name was Persian. Persia held Lycia until it was conquered by Alexander III (the Great) of Macedon during 334–333 BC.

During the Alexander the Great period, Nearchus was appointed viceroy of Lycia and of the land adjacent to it as far as mount Taurus.

Dynastic portraiture on coinage

Although many of the first coins in Antiquity illustrated the images of various gods, the first portraiture of actual rulers appears with the coinage of Lycia in the late 5th century BC. No ruler had dared to illustrate his own portrait on coinage until that time. The Achaemenids had been the first to illustrate the person of their king or a hero in a stereotypical undifferentiated manner, showing a bust or the full body, but never an actual portrait, on their Sigloi and Daric coinage from circa 500 BC. From the time of Alexander the Great, portraiture of the issuing ruler would then become a standard, generalized, feature of coinage.

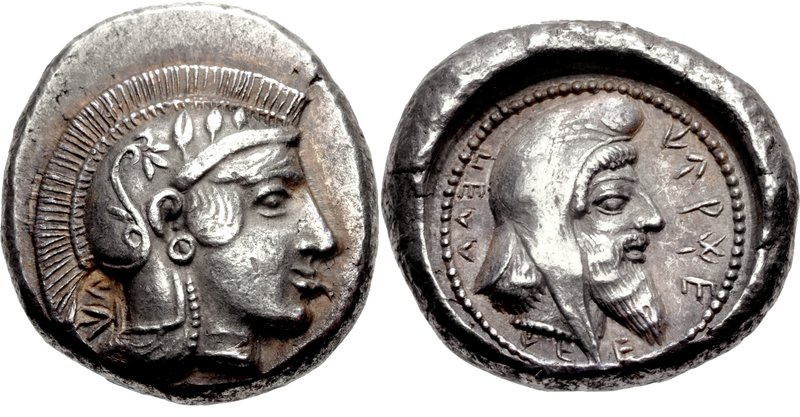
Coin of the dynast of Lycia, Kherei, with Athena on the obverse, and himself wearing the Persian cap on the reverse. 410–390 BC.

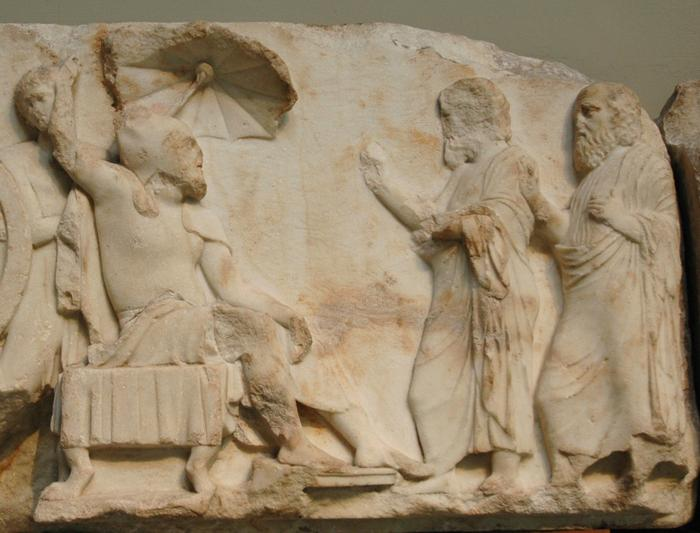
Dynast Arbinas, in Persian dress, receiving emissaries. Scene from the upper podium frieze of the Nereid Monument, c. 380 BC.

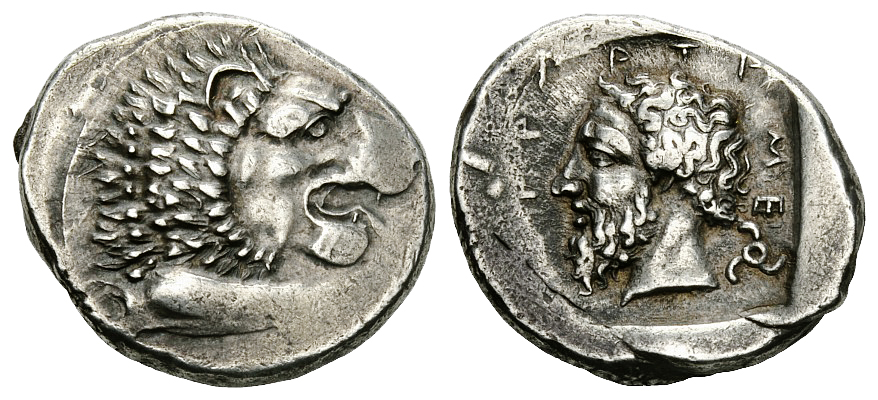
Portrait of Lycian ruler Mithrapata (ruled 390–370 BC).

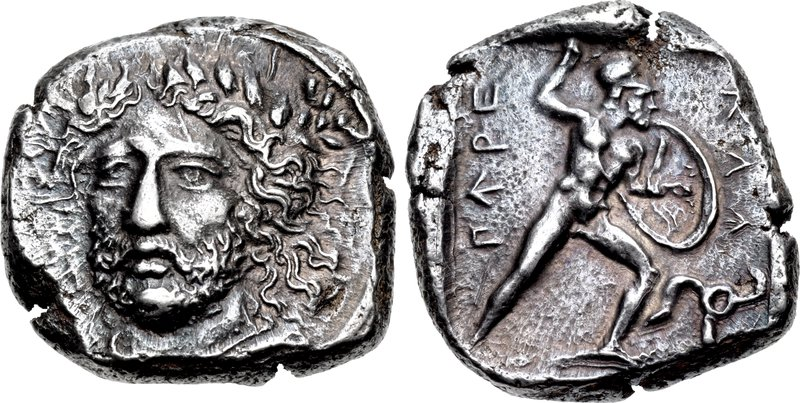
Coin of Perikles, last king of Lycia. Circa 380–360 BC.

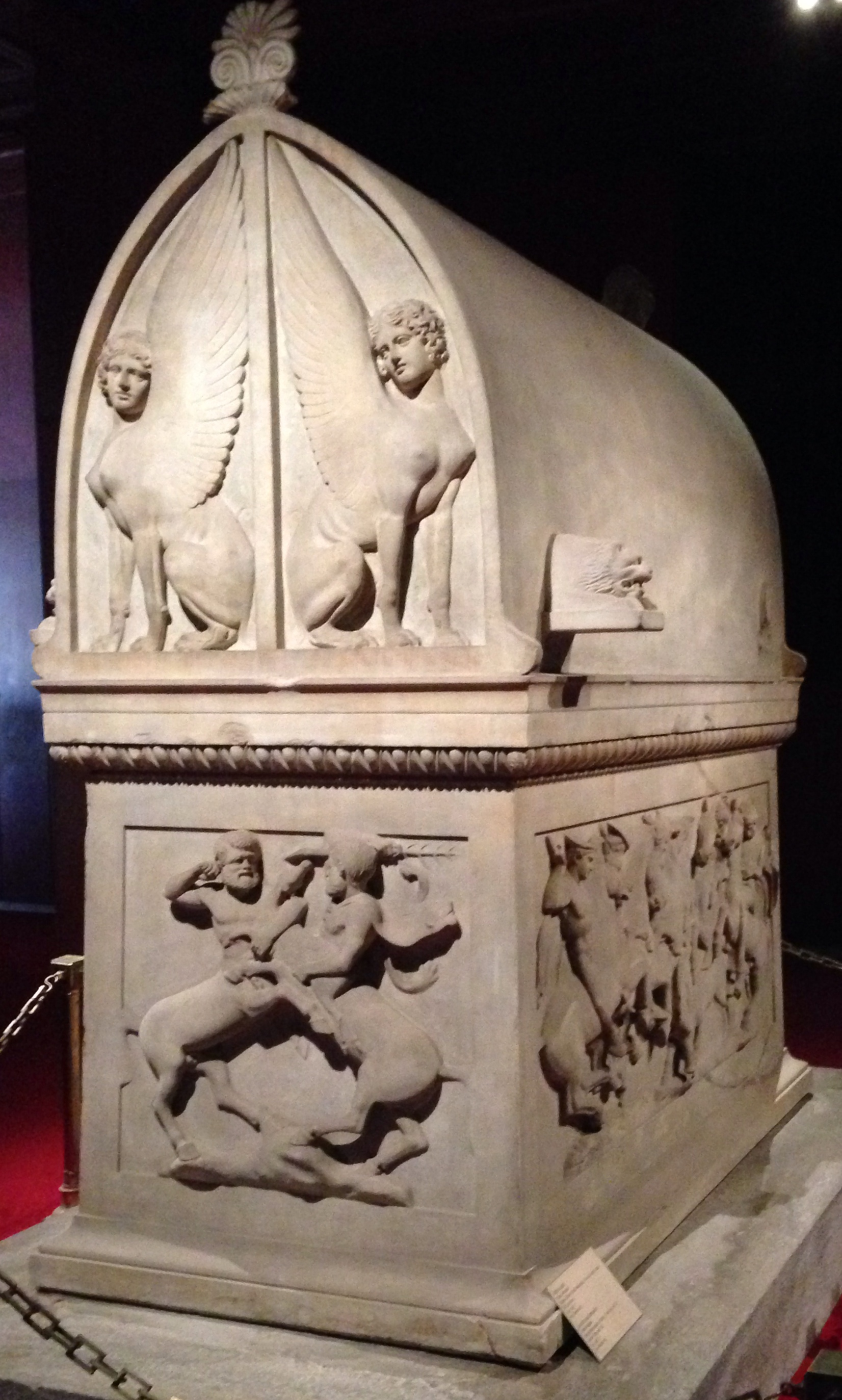
"Lycian sarcophagus of Sidon", Sidon, end of 5th century BC.

=== Hellenistic period (333–168 BC) ===
Ptolemaion in Lymira

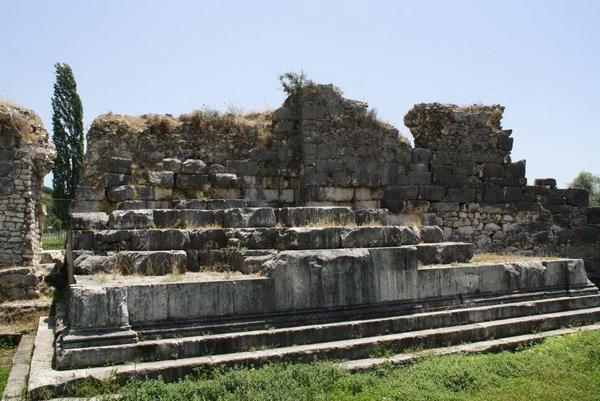
Ptolemaion in Limyra, c. 270 BC.

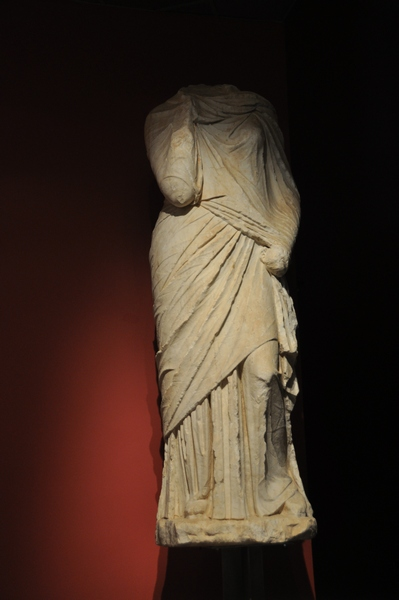
Ptolemaion sculpture of a lady.

After the death of Alexander the Great in 323 BC, his generals fought amongst themselves over the succession. Lycia fell into the hands of the general Antigonus by 304 BC. In 301 BC Antigonus was killed by an alliance of the other successors of Alexander, and Lycia became a part of the kingdom of Lysimachus, who ruled until he was killed in battle in 281 BC.

Control then passed to the Ptolemaic Kingdom, centre on Egypt. Ptolemy II Philadelphos (ruled 285–246 BC), who supported the Limyrans of Lycia when they were threatened by the Galatians (a Celtic tribe that had invaded Asia Minor). The citizens of Limyra in return dedicated a monument to Ptolemy, called the Ptolemaion circa 270 BC. By 240 BC Lycia was firmly part of the Ptolemaic Kingdom, centred on Egypt, and remained in their control through 200 BC.

It had apparently come under Seleucid control by 190 BC, when the Seleucids' defeat in the Battle of Magnesia resulted in Lycia being awarded to Rhodes in the Peace of Apamea in 188 BC.

In 181 BC, at the end of the Roman-Seleucid War, the consul Gnaeus Manlius Vulso decided to fight the Galatian War (189 BC) against the Galatians. He was supported by Attalus II, the king of Pergamon. The two leaders marched inland and reached Pamphylia levying soldiers from local rulers. They then got to the territory of Cibyra, ruled by another tyrant called Moagetes. When Roman envoys went to the city he begged them not to ravage his lands as he was a friend of Rome and promised a paltry sum of money, fifteen talents. Moagetes sent his envoys to Manlius' camp. Polybius had Manlius say that he was the worst enemy of Rome and that he deserved punishment rather than friendship. Moagetes and his friends went to meet Manlius dressed in humble clothing, bewailing the weakness of his town and begging to accept the fifteen talents. Manlius was 'amazed at his impudence' and said that if he did not pay 500 talents, he would lay his lands to waste and sack the city. Moagetes successfully persuaded him to reduce the sum to 100 talents and promised an amount of grain, and Manlius moved on. Polybius described Moagetes as "cruel and treacherous man and worthy of more than a passing notice."

=== Lycian League ===
LYCIAN LEAGUE τὸ Λυκιακοῦ σύστημα
City	Votes
Xanthos	3
Patara	3
Myra	3
Pinara	3
Tlos	3
Olympos	3
Sympolity of Aperlae, Simena, Isinda, Apollonia	1
Amelas	?
Antiphellus	?
Arycanda	?
Balbura	?
Bubon	?
Cyaneae	?
Dias	?
Gagae	?
Idebessos	?
Limyra	?
Oenoanda	?
Phaselis	?
Phellus	?
Podalia	?
Rhodiapolis	?
Sidyma	?
Telmessus	?
Trebenna	?

The Lycian League of independent city-states was the first such democratic union in history and the league remained strong in spite of the mountainous terrain, invasions of foreign powers and attempts of tyrants to take power.

==== Formation ====
The Lycian League (Lykiakon systema in Strabo's Greek — literally a "standing together") is first known from two inscriptions of the early 2nd century BC in which it honors two citizens. Bryce hypothesizes that it was formed as an agent to convince Rome to rescind the annexation of Lycia to Rhodes. It is not known for certain whether it was formed before or after Lycia was removed from Rhodian control. According to Livy, the consul Lucius Cornelius Scipio Asiaticus put Lycia under Rhodian control in 190 BC. He wrote that a Lycian embassy complained about the cruel tyranny of the Rhodians and that when they were under king Antiochus III the Great they had been in liberty in comparison. It was slavery, rather that just political oppression: "they, their wives and children were the victims of violence; their oppressors vented their rage on their persons and their backs, their good name was besmirched and dishonoured, their condition rendered detestable in order that their tyrants might openly assert a legal right over them and reduce them to the status of slaves bought with money.. the senate gave them a letter to and to the Rhodians that ...it was not the pleasure of the senate that either the Lycians or any other men born free should be handed over as slaves to the Rhodians or any one else. The Lycians possessed the same rights under the suzerainty and protection of Rhodes that friendly states possessed under the suzerainty of Rome."

Polybius wrote that the Romans sent envoys to Rhodes to say that "the Lycians had not been handed over to Rhodes as a gift, but to be treated like friends and allies." The Rhodians claimed that king Eumenes of Pergamon had stirred up the Lycians against them. In 169 BC, during the Third Macedonian War, the relationship between Rome and Rhodes became strained and the Roman senate issued a decree which gave the Carians and the Lycians their freedom. Polybius recorded a decree "freeing" the Carians and Lycians in 168–7 BC.

Strabo wrote that there were twenty-three cities which came together for a general assembly and had a share in its votes "after choosing whatever city they approve of". The last statement is unclear. The largest cities had three votes, the medium-sized ones two, and the rest one. He noted that the League did not have freedom over matters of war and peace: "Formerly they deliberated about war and peace, and alliances, but this is not now permitted, as these things are under the control of the Romans. It is only done by their consent, or when it may be for their own advantage." However, they had the freedom to choose a Lyciarch as the head of the league and to designate general courts. He also noted "since they lived under such a good government, they remained ever free under the Romans, thus retaining their ancestral usages [i.e ancestral laws and customs]."

==== Composition ====
Strabo wrote that according to a source the six largest were Xanthos, Patara, Pinara, Olympos, Myra, and Tlos. Tlos was near the pass that leads over into Cibyra. The names of the other cities has been identified by a study of the coins and mention in other texts. The coins recognize two districts, termed, for want of a better term, "monetary districts:" Masicytus and Cragus, both named after mountain ranges, in the shadow of which, presumably, the communities lived and conducted business. Where coinage before the Lycian League had often been stamped LY for Lycia, it was now stamped KP (kr) or MA.

In 81 BC Lucius Licinius Murena, the Roman commander who fought the Second Mithridatic War (83–81 BC) in Anatolia deposed Moagetes, a tyrant of the tetrapolis (four towns) in the Cibyratis (northern Lycia). It had been formed by the city of Cibyra Megale, (Greater Cibyra, as opposed to Cibyra Mikra, Little Cibyra, of the coast, not too far from modern Side). It was in the Cibyratis region, in today's Turkish Lake Region. According to Strabo, Cibyra had two votes, while the other three cities had one and the tetrarchy was ruled by a benign tyrant. When Murena ended the tyranny he included the cities of Balbura and Bubon within the territory of the Lycians.

=== Roman period ===
Lycia was granted autonomy as a protectorate of Rome in 168 BC and remained so until becoming a Roman province in 43 AD under Claudius.

When Rome got involved in the eastern Mediterranean the Lycians allied with Rome. An inscription found in Tyberissos provides the first record of such an alliance treaty (foedus). The dating is uncertain. It precedes the treaty of 46 BC (see below) and could go back to the second or first century BC. The context in which this treaty was made in unknown. It could have been concluded during the expansionist moves by Antiochus III the Great, the Seleucid king, in Anatolia prior to the Roman-Seleucid War (192–188 BC), or during or after this war. Alternatively, it could have been concluded in the context of the Mithridatic Wars in Anatolia in the first century BC. The preamble stated: "There will be peace and loyal alliance between the People of the Romans and the cities of Lycia and the assembly of the Lycians by land and sea for all time." There were four clauses which stipulated that: 1) the Lycian League was not to allow enemies of Rome to cross all territory over which they had authority so that they could bring war on Rome or her subjects and was not to give them aid; 2) Rome was not to allow enemies of the Lycians to pass through territory they controlled or had authority over so that they might bring war on the Lycian League or the people subject to them and was not to give them aid; 3) if anyone started a war against the Lycian people first, Rome was to come to her aid as soon as possible and if anyone started a war against Rome, the Lycian league was to aid Rome as soon as possible provided that this was allowed to Rome and the Lycian League in accordance with the agreements and oath; 4) Additions and subtractions to the agreements were possible if each side agreed though a joint decision.

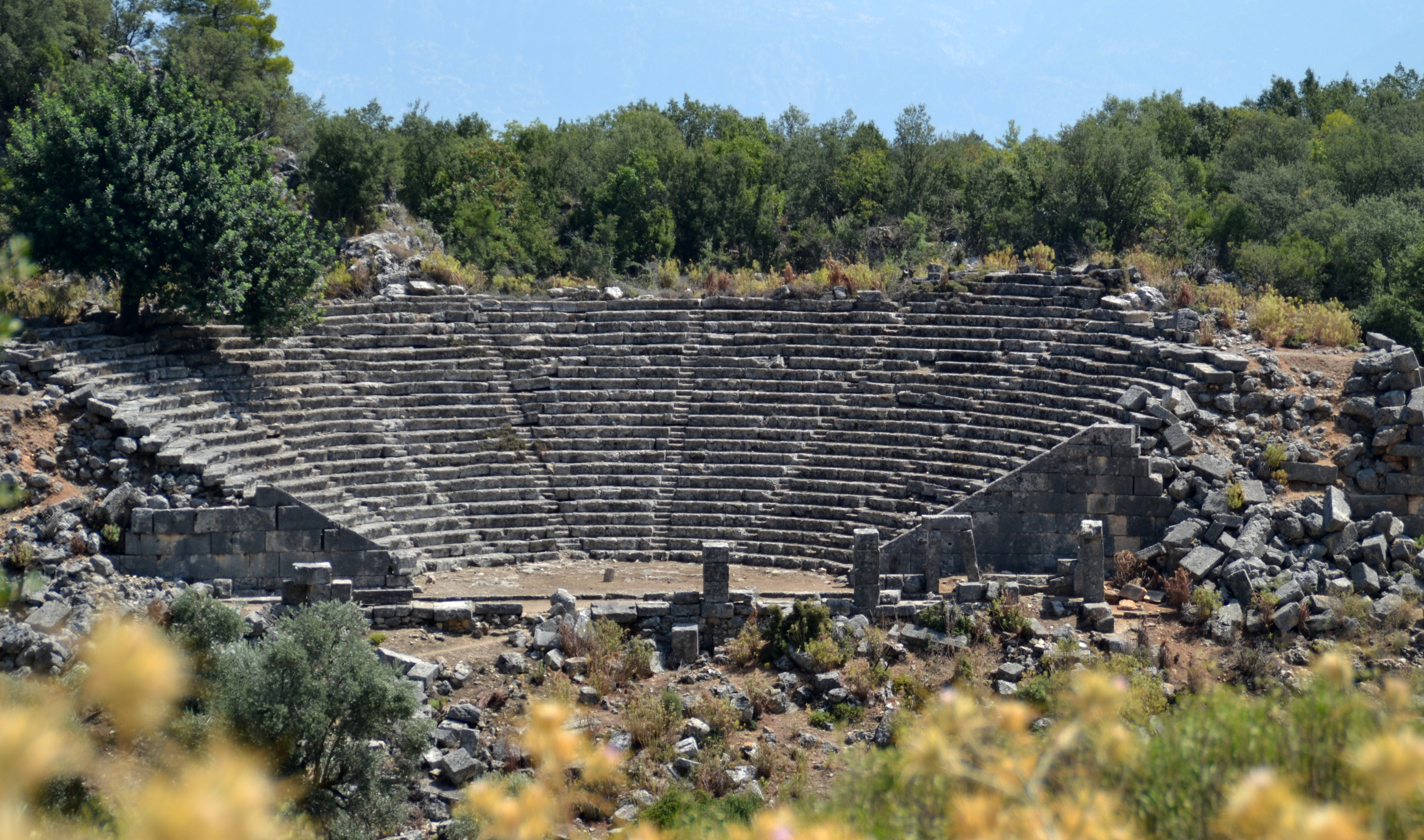
The Roman theater in Pinara.

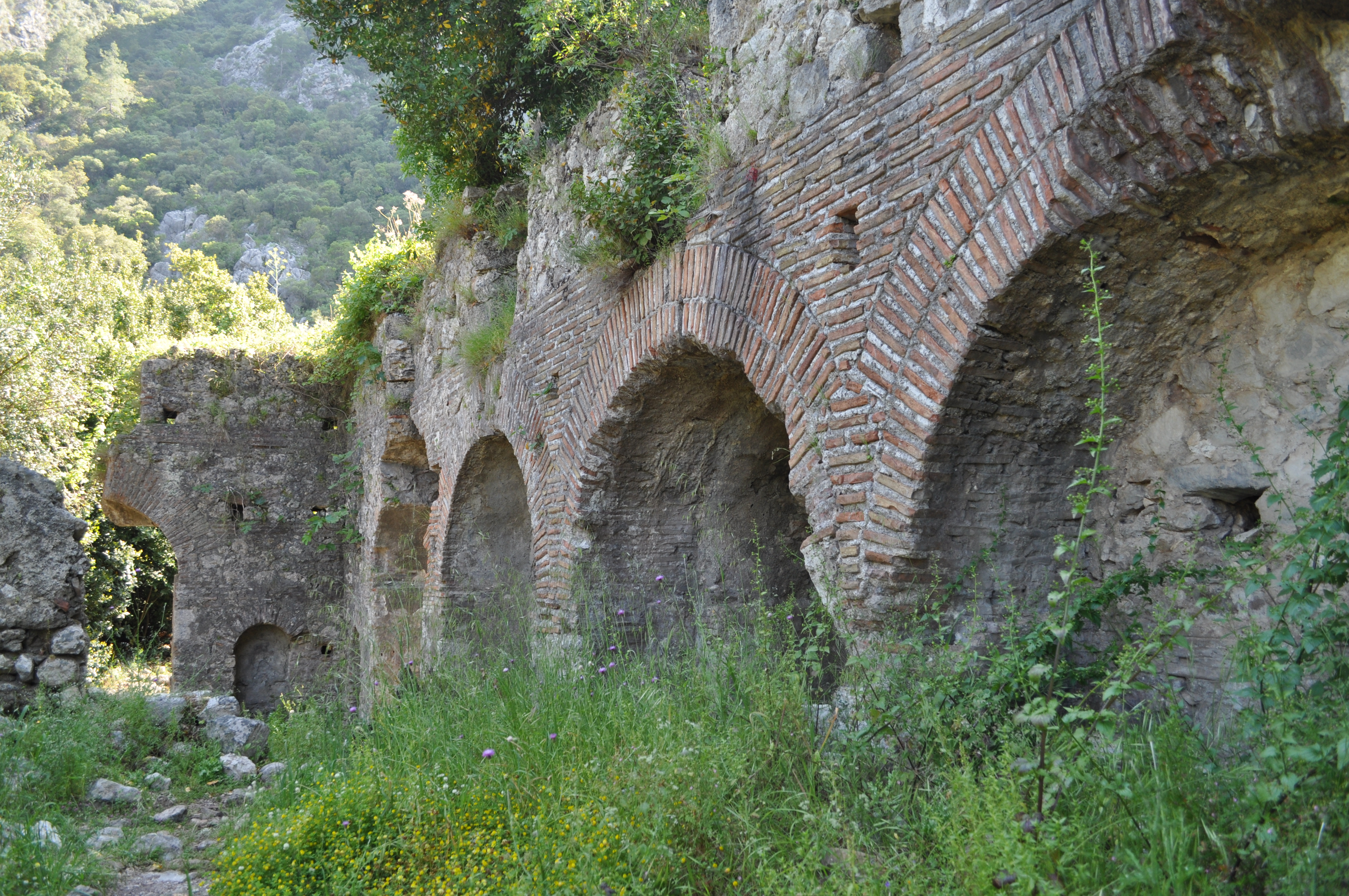
Roman baths in Olympos.

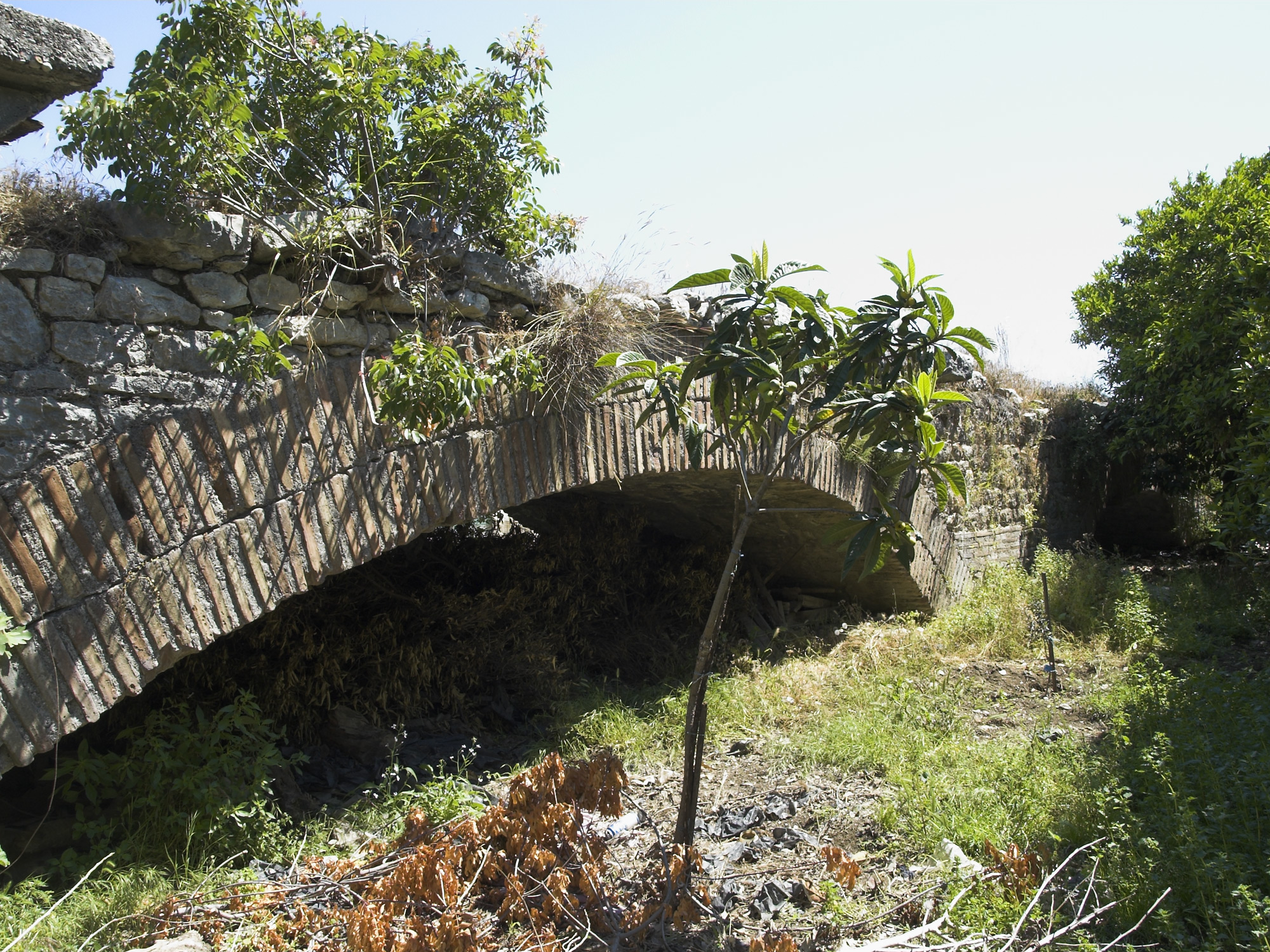
The Roman Bridge near Limyra in Lycia, one of the oldest segmental arch bridges in the world.

An inscription found on a statue-base found in Thespiae attests that in 46 BC Julius Caesar signed a treaty with the Lycian league. It had nine articles. The first article stipulated "Friendship, alliance and peace both by land and sea in perpetuity "Let the Lycians observe the power and preeminence of the Romans as is proper in all circumstances." The other articles stipulated: 2) Neutrality of each party to the other's enemy; 3) mutual help in case of an attack on either party; 4) anyone charged with import or export of contraband goods was to be charged by the highest official of the two parties; 5) Romans accused of a capital crime in Lycia were to be judged in Rome by her own laws and Lycians accused of these crimes were to be judged in Lycia by her own laws; 6) Romans in a dispute with Lycians were to be judged in Lycia according to her own laws, if Lycians were brought to court by Romans the case was to be heard by whatever official the disputants chose for the case to be dealt with justly; 7) No person was to be taken as a surety, Roman and Lycian war prisoners were to be returned to their own countries, captured horses, slaves or ships were to be restored; 8) named cities, ports and territories which were restored to the Lycians were to belong to them; 9) both parties agreed to abide by the terms of this oath and the treaty. Details could be amended if both parties agreed.

In 43 AD the emperor Claudius annexed Lycia. Cassius Dio wrote that Claudius "reduced the Lycians to servitude because they had revolted and slain some Romans and he incorporated them in the prefecture of Pamphylia". He also provided some details of the investigation of this affair conducted in the senate. Suetonius wrote that Claudius "deprived the Lycians of their independence because of deadly intestine feuds". In an inscription found at Perge which has been dated to late 46/early 45 BC the Lycians, who described themselves as "faithful allies", praised Claudius for freeing them from disturbances, lawlessness and brigandage and for the restoration of the ancestral laws. It makes a reference to the transfer of power from the multitude to the councillors, selected from among the best. Therefore, it seems that there might have been a revolutionary popular uprising which could have overturned the established order. The annexation of Lycia seems to fit the common reason for annexing Roman client states or allies in this period: the loss on stability due to internal strife or, in some cases, the weakening or end of a ruling dynasty. The restoration of ancestral law was probably linked to the Roman practice of respecting and guaranteeing the ancestral laws, customs and privileges of city-states or leagues of city-states it made alliance agreements with in the eastern Mediterranean. Lycia was annexed, but the Lycian League was retained as so were self-governance regarding most local matters according to local traditional laws and the League's authority over local courts. The treaty concluded by Caesar in 46 BC had already established a framework for the distinction of judicial areas under the competence of the Lycian League and those under the Roman praetor peregrino (chief justice for foreigners) and could be used to define the assignment of legal areas between the Roman provincial governor and the League. The Romans re-established stability in Lycia and retained friendly relations with the Lycians and Lycian rights to their traditional laws, customs and privileges.

In 74 AD the emperor Vespasian joined the Roman provinces of Lycia and Pamphylia into the province of Lycia et Pamphylia. Cassius Dio's statement that Claudius incorporated Lycia into Phampylia (which he had as governed by a prefect, rather than a propraetor, see above) is refuted by the existence of legati Augusti pro praetore Lyciae (imperial provincial governors of Lycia with propraetorial rank). The adoptive son and heir of Augustus, Gaius Caesar, died in Lycia in 4 AD after being wounded during a campaign in Artagira, Armenia.

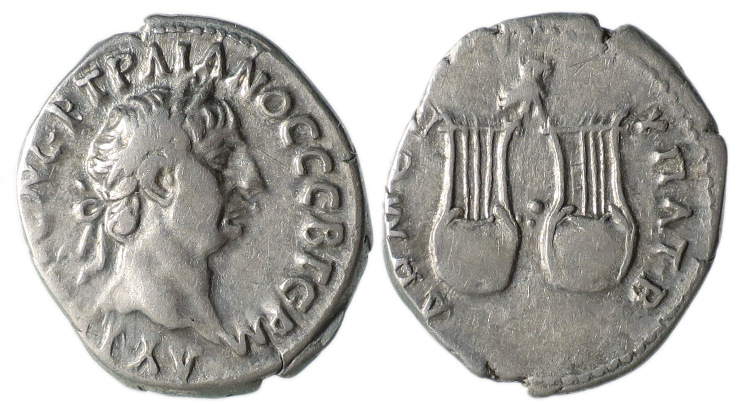
Silver Drachm of Trajan from Lycia, 98–99 AD, minted during Roman rule.

=== Byzantine era ===
During the Byzantine period Lycia and Pamphylia came under the command of the Karabisianoi (the mainstay of the Byzantine navy from the mid-7th century until the early 8th century). After the Karabisianoi were disbanded (between c. 719/720 and c. 727) they became the Theme of the Cibyrrhaeots.

=== Turkish era ===
Abandoned Greek city of Kayaköy

Lycia was incorporated into the Ottoman Empire and eventually became part of Turkey. After World War I, Lycia was assigned to the kingdom of Italy according to the terms of the Treaty of Sèvres and occupied for a few years, but in 1923 was assigned to Turkey.

During this period, Lycia hosted both Turkish and Greek communities. The substantial Christian community of Greeks lived in Lycia until the 1920s, when they were forced to migrate to Greece after the population exchange between Greece and Turkey following the Greco-Turkish War (1919–1922). The abandoned Greek villages in the region are a striking reminder of this exodus. Abandoned Greek houses can still be seen in the region, and Kaya is a Greek ghost town. A small population of Turkish farmers moved into the region when the Lycian Greeks migrated. The region is now one of the key centres of domestic and foreign tourism in Turkey.

== In Greek mythology ==
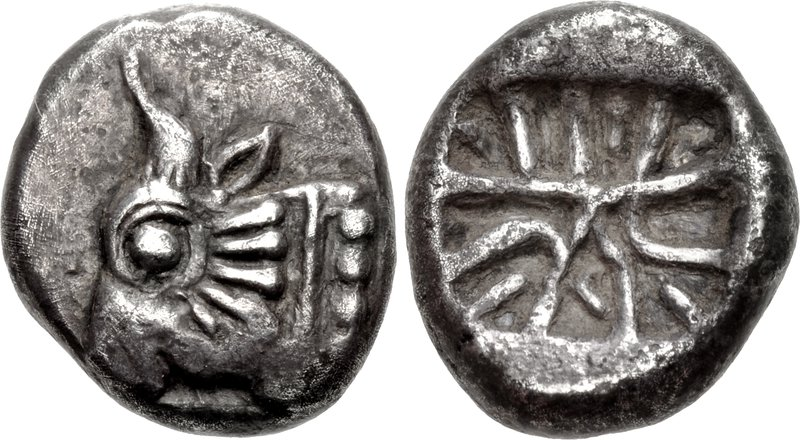
Lycia coin, c. 520–470 BC.

According to Herodotus, the earliest known name for the area was Milyas, and its original inhabitants, who spoke the Milyan language, were the Milyae (Μιλύαι), or Milyans, also known by the exonyms Sólymoi (Σόλυμοι), Solymi, and Solymians.

In Greek mythology, Solymus or Solymos was the ancestral hero and eponym of the Solymi. He was a son of either Zeus or Ares; his mother's name is variously given as Chaldene, Caldene ("daughter of Pisidus"), Calchedonia, or Chalcea "the nymph". Meanwhile, Europa had (at least) two sons, Sarpedon and Minos, who vied for the kingship of their native land, Crete. Minos drove Sarpedon and his people, the Termilae, into exile and they settled in Milyas. Subsequently, Lycus of Athens (son of Pandion II), who was driven into exile by his brother, King Aegeus, settled in Milyas among the Termilae. The name Lycia was adopted subsequently in honor of Lycus. (It had in fact been around much longer under the name Lukka, probably derived from the same root as Latin lucus (grove, bright space)). Herodotus ends his tale with the observation that the Lycians were matrilineal.

Lycia appears elsewhere in Greek myth, such as in the story of Bellerophon, who eventually succeeded to the throne of the Lycian king Iobates (or Amphianax). Lycia was frequently mentioned by Homer as an ally of Troy. In Homer's Iliad, the Lycian contingent was said to have been led by two esteemed warriors: Sarpedon (son of Zeus and Laodamia) and Glaucus (son of Hippolochus).

== See also ==
- Ancient regions of Anatolia
- Lycian peasants
- Lycian script
- Saint Gerasimus of the Jordan, 5th-century Christian saint born in Lycia
- Saint Nicholas, Christian saint said to have been born in Patara, Lycia
- Saint Christopher, Christian saint said to have been of the region of Lycia

== Sources ==
=== Primary sources ===
- "Poem on the Battle of Kadesh" 305–313, Ramesses II
- "Great Karnak Inscription" 572–592, Merneptah
  Breasted, J. H. 1906. Ancient Records of Egypt. Vol. III. Chicago: University of Chicago Press.
- "Plague Prayers of Mursilis" A1–11, b, Mursilis
  Pritchard, J. B. 1969. Ancient Near Eastern Texts. Princeton: Princeton University Press.
- Ovidius Naso, Publius (1997). Ovid's Metamorphoses, Books 1-5. University of Oklahoma Press. ISBN 978-0-8061-2894-8.

=== Secondary sources ===
- Auerbach, Jeffrey; Hoffenberg, Peter (2013). Britain, the Empire, and the World at the Great Exhibition of 1851. Surrey: Ashgate Publishing, Ltd. ISBN 978-1-4094-8008-2.
- Bryce, T.; Zahle, J. (1986). The Lycians. Vol. 1. Copenhagen: Museum Tusculanum Press. – Covers the Lycians and where they lived, their history, language, culture, cults, and their language.
- Hill, George Francis (1897). "Catalogue of the Greek Coins of Lycia, Pamphylia, and Pisidia". A Catalogue of the Greek Coins in the British Museum. London: Trustees of the British Museum. – A presentation of the history of Lycia during the time of its minting coins, and the coins.
- Keen, Antony G. (1998) [1992]. Dynastic Lycia: A Political History of the Lycians & Their Relations with Foreign Powers, c. 545 – 362 BC. Mnemosyne: bibliotheca classica Batavia. Supplementum. Leiden; Boston; Köln: Brill. ISBN 90-04-10956-0.
- Spratt, Thomas (1847). Travels in Lycia, Milyas, and the Cibyratis. London: J. Van Voorst. OCLC 582161294.

=== Further reading ===
- Barnett, R. D. (1975). "The Sea Peoples". In J. B. Bury; S. A. Cook; F. E. Adcock (eds.). The Cambridge Ancient History. Vol. II, part 2. Cambridge: Cambridge University Pressbarne. pp. 362–366. – Refers to many different sea peoples and their contact with Egypt and Anatolia. Also tells about the Philistines during the reign of Ramesses III.
- Bryce, T. (1993). "Lukka Revisited". Journal of Near Eastern Studies. 51 (2): 121–130. doi:10.1086/373535. S2CID 222441745. – Discusses Lukka's relations to other regions (like Miletus) and where they inhabited.
- Drews, R. (1995). The End of the Bronze Age: Changes in Warfare and the Catastrophe ca. 1200 B.C. Princeton: Princeton University Press. – A description of the Egyptian evidence on the Sea Peoples.
- Jacobson MJ, Pickett J, Gascoigne AL, Fleitmann D, Elton H (2022) Settlement, environment, and climate change in SW Anatolia: Dynamics of regional variation and the end of Antiquity. PLoS ONE 17(6): e0270295. https://doi.org/10.1371/journal.pone.0270295
- Kılıç Aslan, Selen (2023). Lycian families in the Hellenistic and Roman periods. A regional study of inscriptions: towards a social and legal framework. Leiden; Boston: Brill. ISBN 978-90-04-54841-1.
