= Bonfante =

Bonfante is a surname. Notable people with the surname include:

- Giuliano Bonfante (1904–2005), Italian linguist
- Larissa Bonfante (1931–2019), Italian-American classicist
- Paola Bonfante (born 1947), Italian botanist
- Samuel Bonfante (born 1959), Italian-American Education Technology Executive and President of Hatch Early Learning
