= Nereid Monument =

Tomb originally in Xanthos, present-day Turkey; now in the British Museum

Nereid Monument
(Tomb of Arbinas)

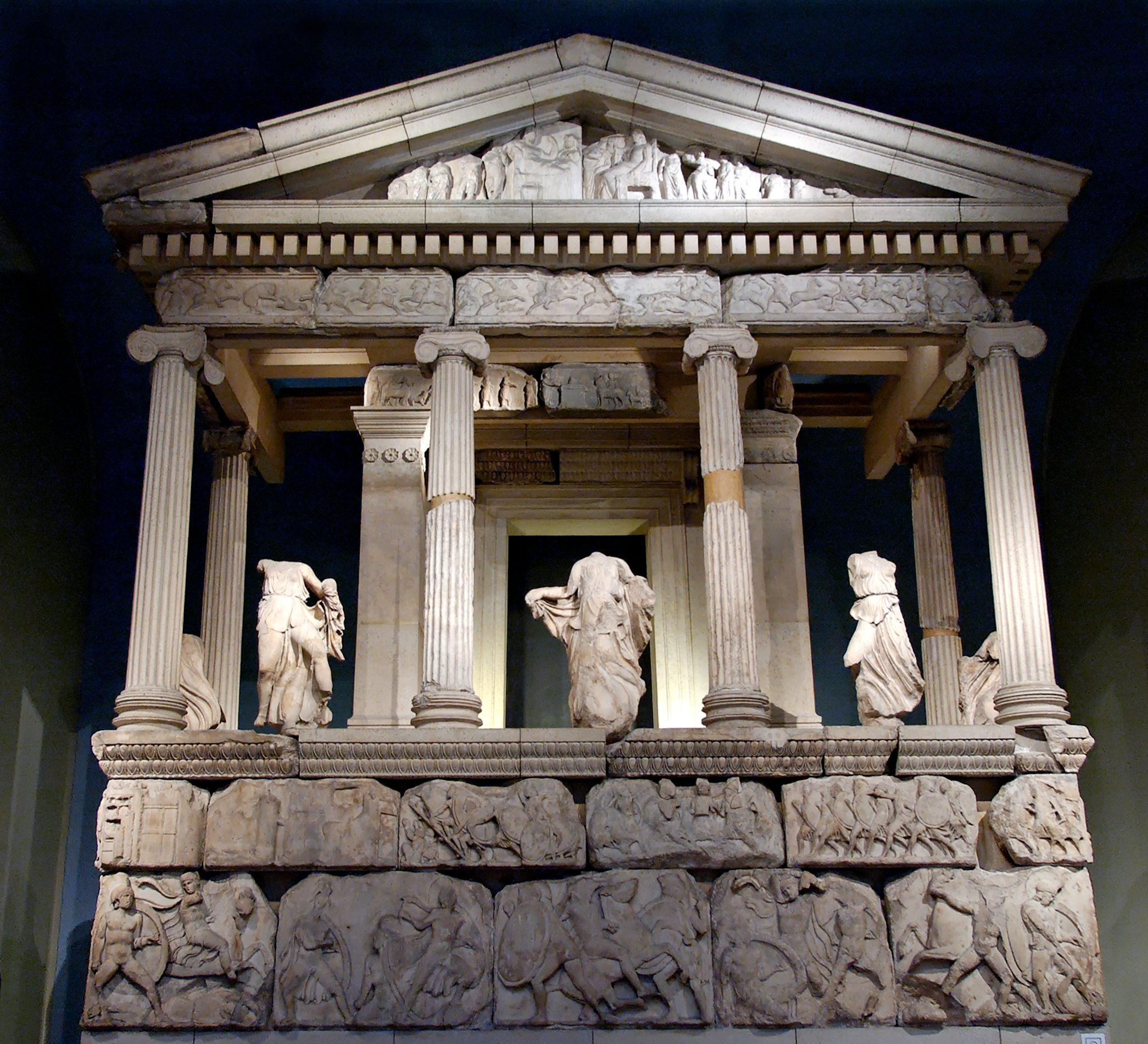
The reconstructed façade of the monument in the British Museum

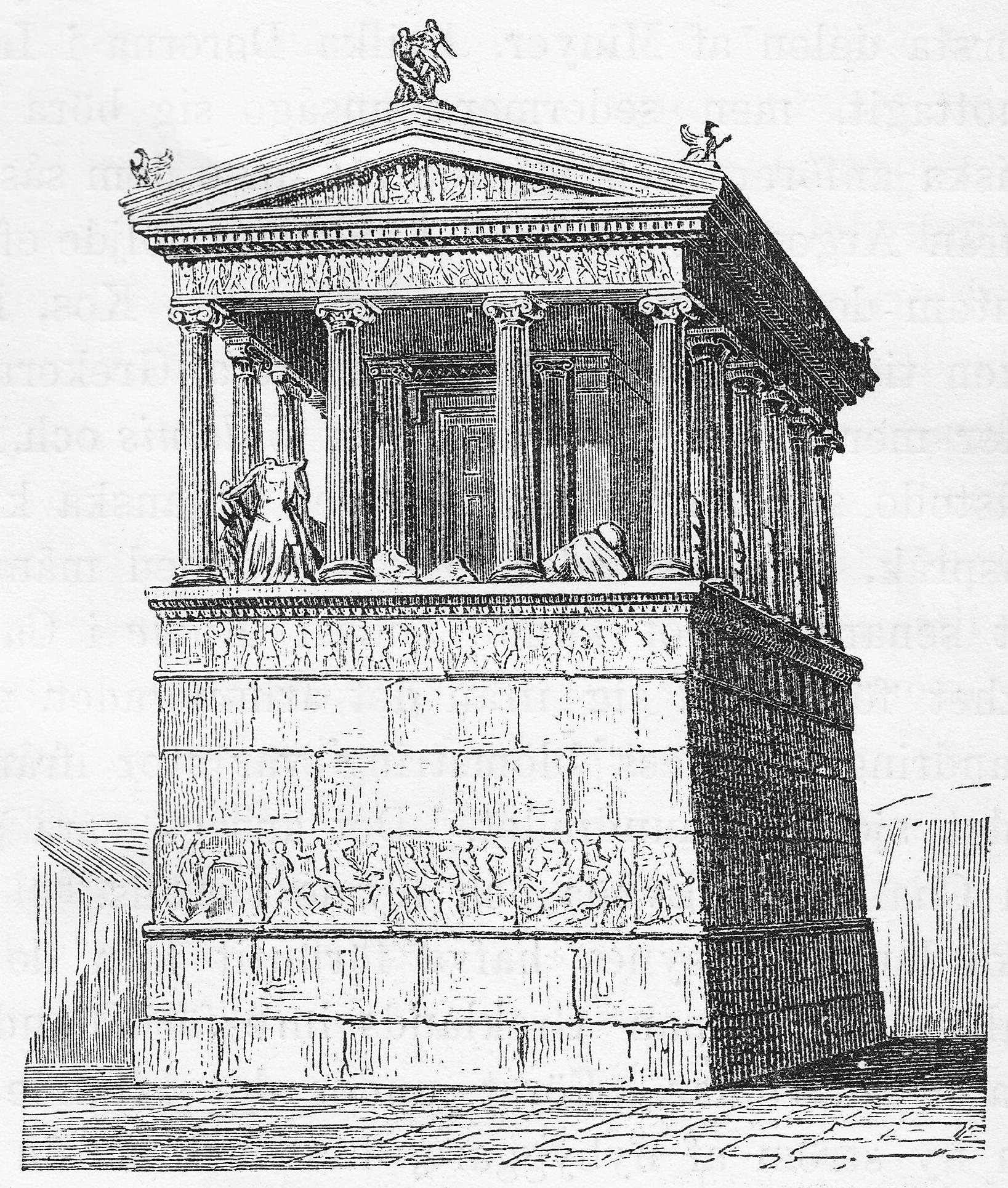
Reconstitution of the original Nereid Monument, originally set on a high base

Original location of the Nereid Monument, in Xanthos, Lycia, modern Turkey

The Nereid Monument is a sculptured tomb from Xanthos in Lycia (then part of the Achaemenid Persian Empire), close to present-day Fethiye in Mugla Province, Turkey. It took the form of a Greek temple on top of a base decorated with sculpted friezes, and is thought to have been built in the early fourth century BC (circa 390 BC) as a tomb for Arbinas (Lycian: Erbbina, or Erbinna), the Xanthian dynast who ruled western Lycia under the Achaemenid Empire.

The tomb is thought to have stood until the Byzantine era before falling into ruin. The ruins were rediscovered by British traveller Charles Fellows in the early 1840s. Fellows had them shipped to the British Museum, where some of them have been reconstructed to show what the east façade of the monument would have looked like.

According to Melanie Michailidis, though bearing a Greek appearance, the Nereid Monument, the Harpy Tomb and the Tomb of Payava were built in accordance with main Zoroastrian criteria "by being composed of thick stone, raised on plinths off the ground, and having single windowless chambers". The Nereid Monument was the main inspiration for the famous Mausoleum at Halicarnassus.

== Tombs in Xanthos ==
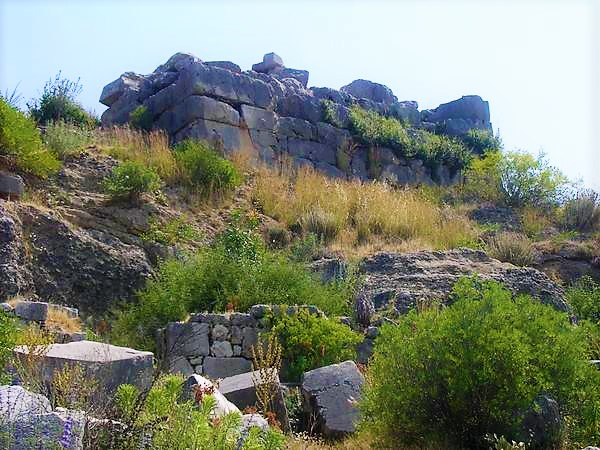
Original podium of the Nereid Monument at Xanthos.

Xanthos, also called Xanthus, was a chief city state of the Lycians, an indigenous people of southwestern Anatolia (present-day Turkey). Many of the tombs at Xanthos are pillar tombs, formed of a stone burial chamber on top of a large stone pillar. The body would be placed in the top of the stone structure, elevating it above the landscape. The tombs are for men who ruled in a Lycian dynasty from the mid-6th century to the mid-4th century BCE and help to show the continuity of their power in the region. Not only do the tombs serve as a form of monumentalization to preserve the memory of the rulers, but they also reveal the adoption of Greek style of decoration. Xanthos was chief city state governed by a king, who was under an Achaemenid Empire governor. The continuity of the dynastic rule in Xanthos was shown through a tradition of building pillar tombs. When these tombs were made, predominant Late Classical Greek ideas of art pervaded Lycian imagery. The pillars were excavated by Sir Charles Fellows, an Englishman who excavated in the Levant and Asia Minor, and were transported to the British Museum in 1848 C.E.

== Arbinas ==
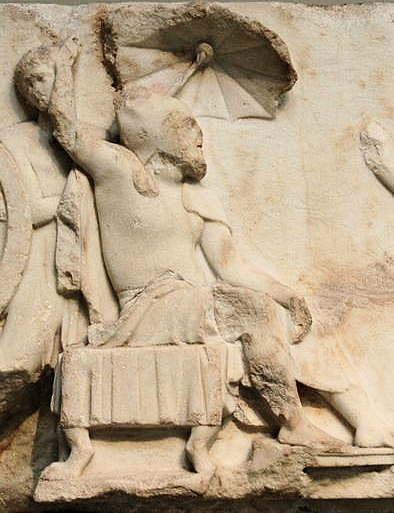
Arbinas, owner of the tomb and Lycian dynast of the Achaemenid Empire, in Achaemenid dress on the Nereid Monument

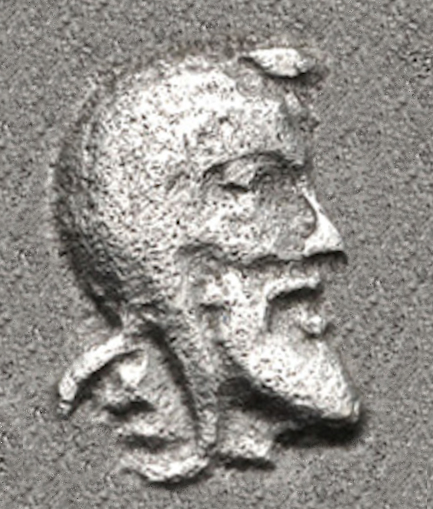
Portrait of King Arbinas, wearing the Achaemenid satrapal cap, from his coinage. Circa 430/20–400 BC

Lycia was conquered by Harpagus for the Achaemenid Persian Empire in approximately 540 BC, and his conquest of Xanthos is described by both Herodotus and Appian. For much of the 5th century BC, Athens dominated the lands bordering the Aegean Sea, and many of them, including Lycia, were paying protection money into the exchequer of the Athenian maritime empire, the Delian League, and land tax to the Persians. There is evidence of a fire that destroyed the wooden tombs and temples of Xanthos in around 470 BC. This fire was probably caused by Cimon of Athens when he attacked the sacred citadel in retaliation for the Achaemenid destruction of Athens by the Persians and their allies, including the Lycians, in 480 BC. The Xanthians, under their dynast, Kuprilli, rebuilt the buildings in stone.

Around 440 BC, Kheriga, Kuprilli's grandson, succeeded him, and in turn Kheriga's brother, Kherei, is thought to have succeeded him in around 410 BC. Arbinas was Kheriga's son, but had to take Xanthos and other Lycian cities by force of arms in around 390 BC in order to reclaim his birthright. Arbinas then ruled Western Lycia from Xanthos, and he built the Nereid Monument as his tomb. He died in around 370BC.

== Description ==
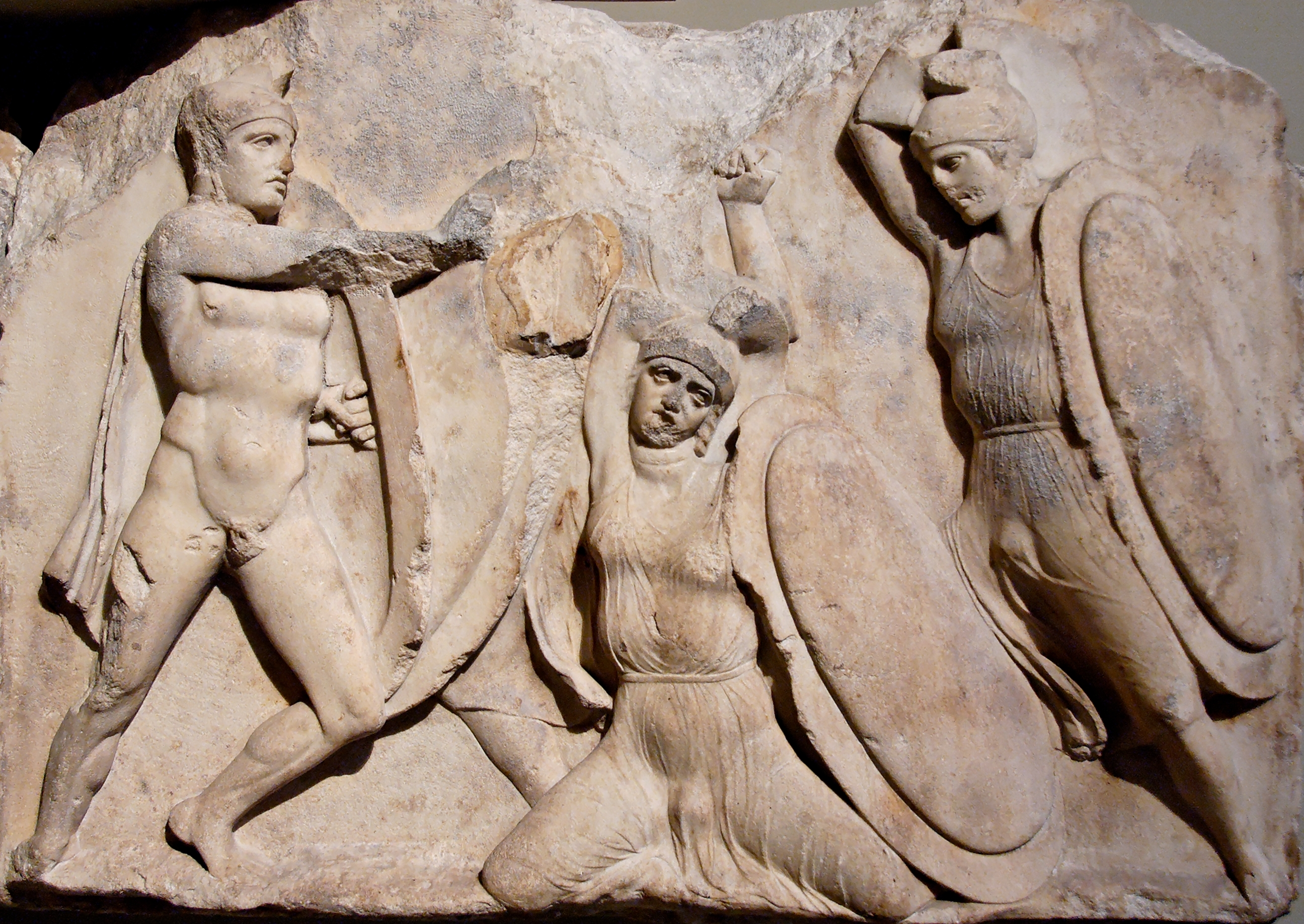
A young warrior dies. Block from the greater podium frieze

Although Arbinas ruled Lycia as part of the Persian Empire, the monument is built in a Greek style, influenced by the Ionic temples of the Athenian Acropolis. The rich narrative sculptures on the monument portray Arbinas in various ways, combining Greek and Persian aspects.

The temple-like tomb had four columns on its east and west faces, and six on the north and south. It stood elevated on a substantial podium, decorated with two friezes: a shallower upper frieze above a deeper lower frieze. In the reconstruction in the British Museum, the podium consists simply of the two friezes above one layer of blocks, whereas Fellows's sketch of the monument showed a much taller structure with two substantial rows of blocks below the lower frieze, and a further two rows separating the lower from the upper frieze. There are also reliefs on the architrave, cella walls, and in the pediment.

There were many large free-standing sculptures, including those of Nereids between each pair of main columns.

=== Friezes ===
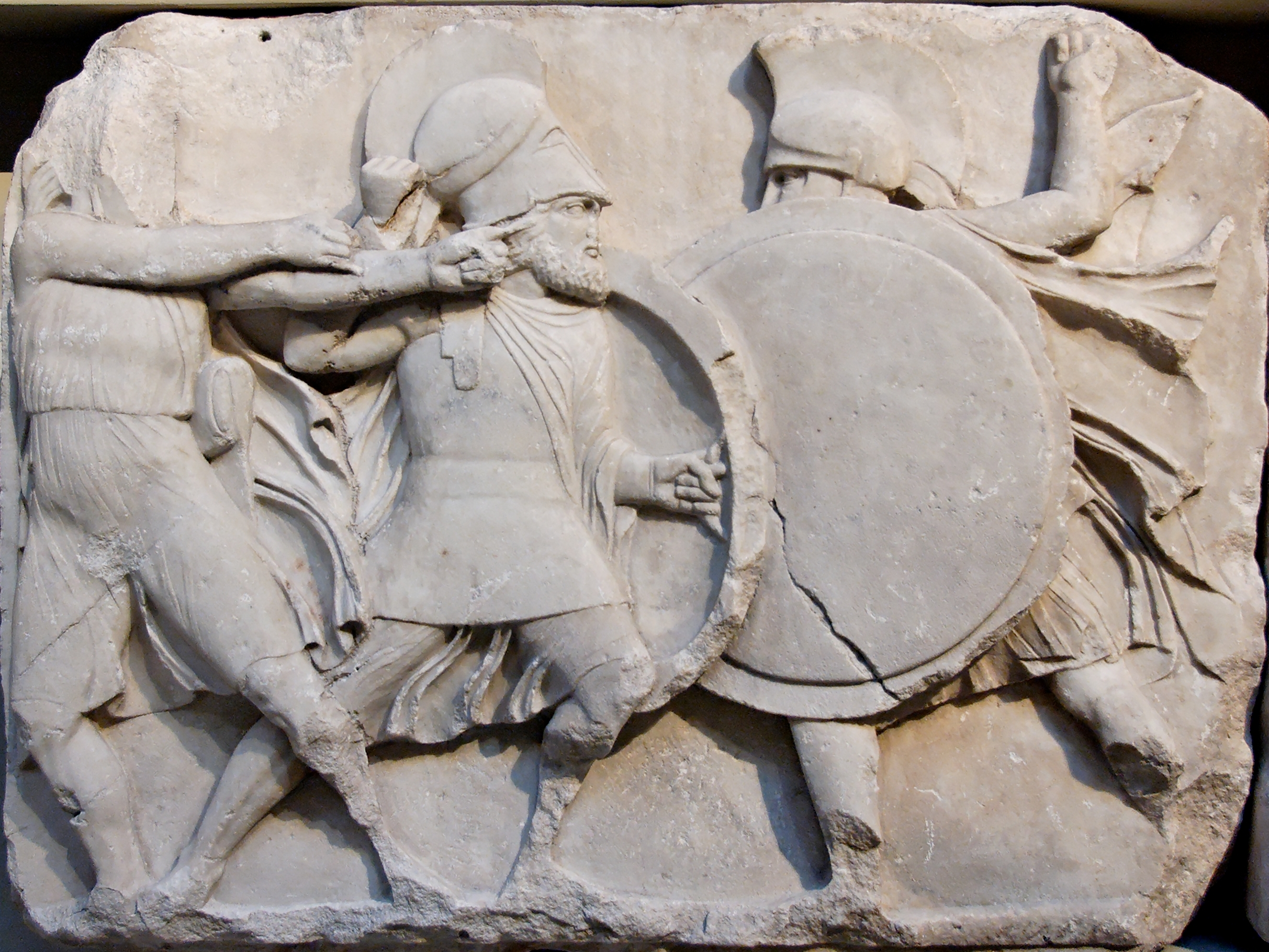
Warriors in combat

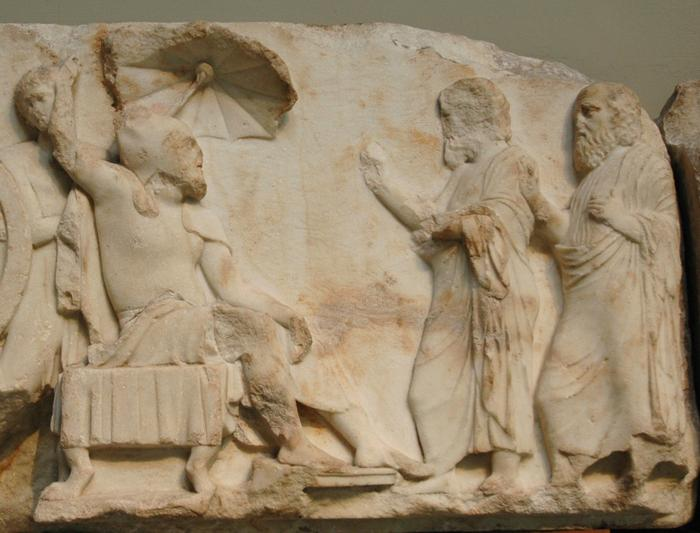
Arbinas, in Persian dress, receives emissaries. Scene from the upper podium frieze

==== Greater podium frieze ====
The larger and lower frieze on the podium was made up of 22 blocks, of which seven are lost apart from fragments. The surviving panels represent heroic battle scenes, with no apparent overall narrative, mostly involving male soldiers dressed in Greek costume and armour. Unlike many friezes from the same period, they are not pitched against Amazons, centaurs or obvious foreigners.

==== Upper podium frieze ====
The upper, shallower frieze on the podium also consisted of 22 blocks, and three have been lost. Each of the four sides of this frieze represents the siege of a city. The cities are portrayed with characteristic Lycian merlons, and the frieze is thought to represent Arbinas's conquest of Lycian cities so as to ensure his succession to the leadership.

Arbinas is represented in various ways, including sitting in Persian style, shaded with a parasol, and with his feet supported off the ground by a footstool. There is also variety in the soldiers, including heavily armed hoplites and archers, and there are prisoners being led away, and besiegers scaling city walls with ladders.

==== Architrave frieze ====
The frieze on the architrave on top of the columns is carved in a simpler, more naive style than the podium friezes. It again portrays scenes of combat, but also a boar hunt, figures bearing offerings, and preparations for a banquet.

==== Cella frieze ====
The frieze at the top of the outside wall of the cella would have been the least visible, being screened by the columns. It contains scenes of sacrifices and banqueting. There are two figures at the banquet who dine on couches of their own. One is taken to be Arbinas, and he is larger than all the other banqueting figures, and the other may be his son. Here Arbinas is shown with hair and beard like the kings of Persia or Assyria, and he holds a Persian drinking horn.

=== Pediments ===
Each of the two pediments (gable ends) of the monument was decorated with a relief, rather than with the fully rounded sculptures found on pediments of most buildings of the period in Greece. The relief on the east pediment shows Arbinas and his wife seated, and Ian Jenkins suggests that this was inspired by the portrayal of Zeus and Hera on the east frieze of the Parthenon. Smaller figures are thought to represent the children and pet dog of the ruling family. Only one of the two panels that made up the west pediment relief survives. In contrast to the static family scene on the east side, this shows soldiers moving in battle.

=== Nereids ===
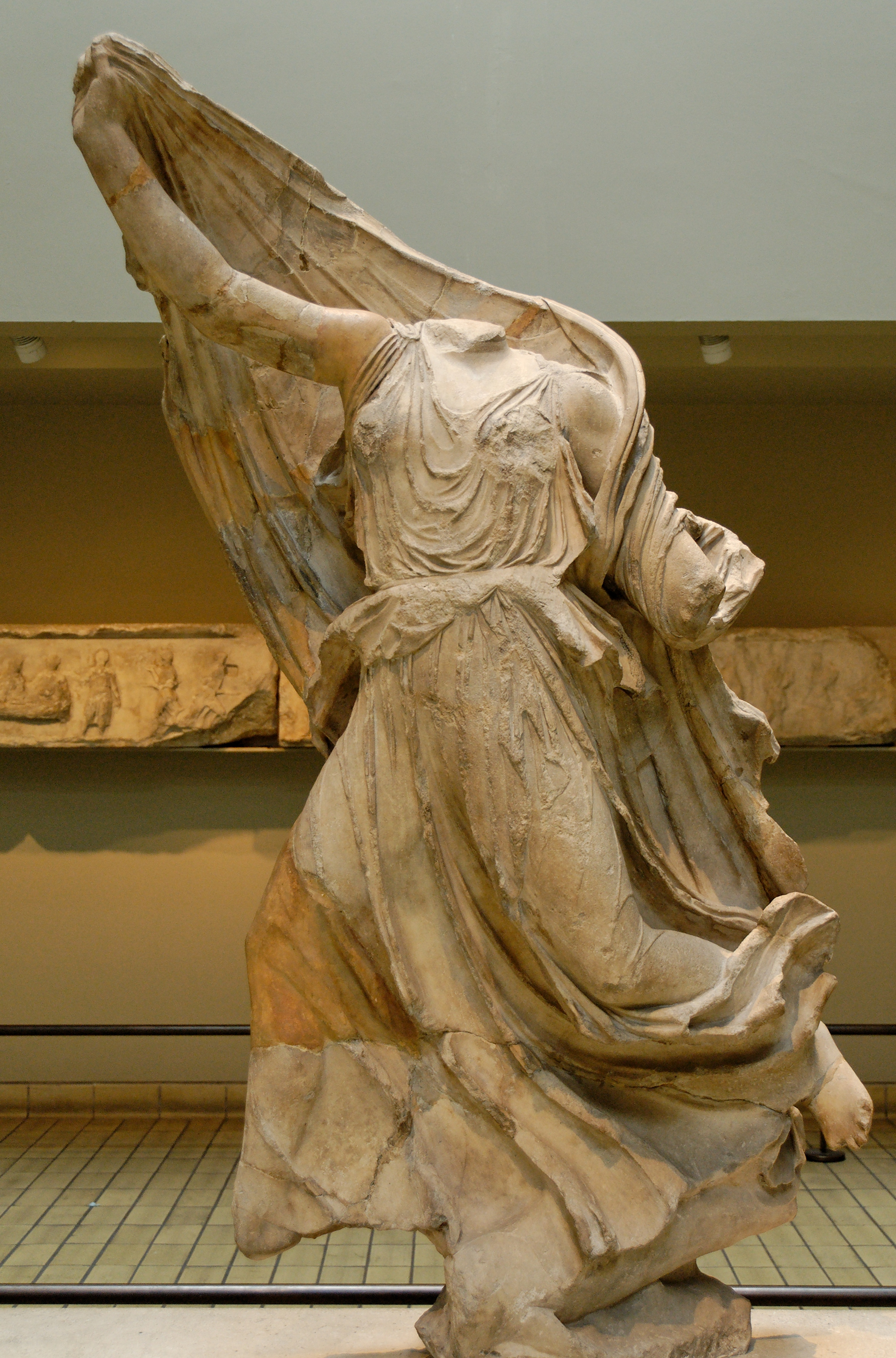
One of the nereids

The monument is now named after the life-size female figures in wind-blown drapery. Eleven survive, which would have been enough to fill the spaces between columns on the east and west sides, and the three on the north. Jenkins speculates that there might never have been figures on the south side. They are identified as sea-nymphs because various sculpted sea creatures were found under the feet of seven of them, including dolphins, a cuttlefish, and a bird that may be a sea-gull. They have generally been called Nereids, though Thurstan Robinson argues that this is imposing a Greek perspective on Lycian sculptures, and that they should rather be seen as eliyãna, Lycian water-nymphs associated with fresh-water sources and referenced on the Letoon trilingual inscription, which was discovered a few kilometres to the south of the site of the Monument.

=== Other figures ===
As well as the Nereids, there were sculptures of various other figures, including several that served as acroteria, crowning the angles and apex of the pediment. Each of the two main surviving acroteria involves a young man and a young woman, and they are variously interpreted as representing the rape of the daughters of Leukippos by the twins Castor and Pollux, or as the Nereid Thetis being carried off by Peleus, or as exploits of Herakles.

== Rediscovery and reconstruction ==
The monument is thought to have stood until the Byzantine era, and then to have been destroyed by local Christians for its stones and metals.

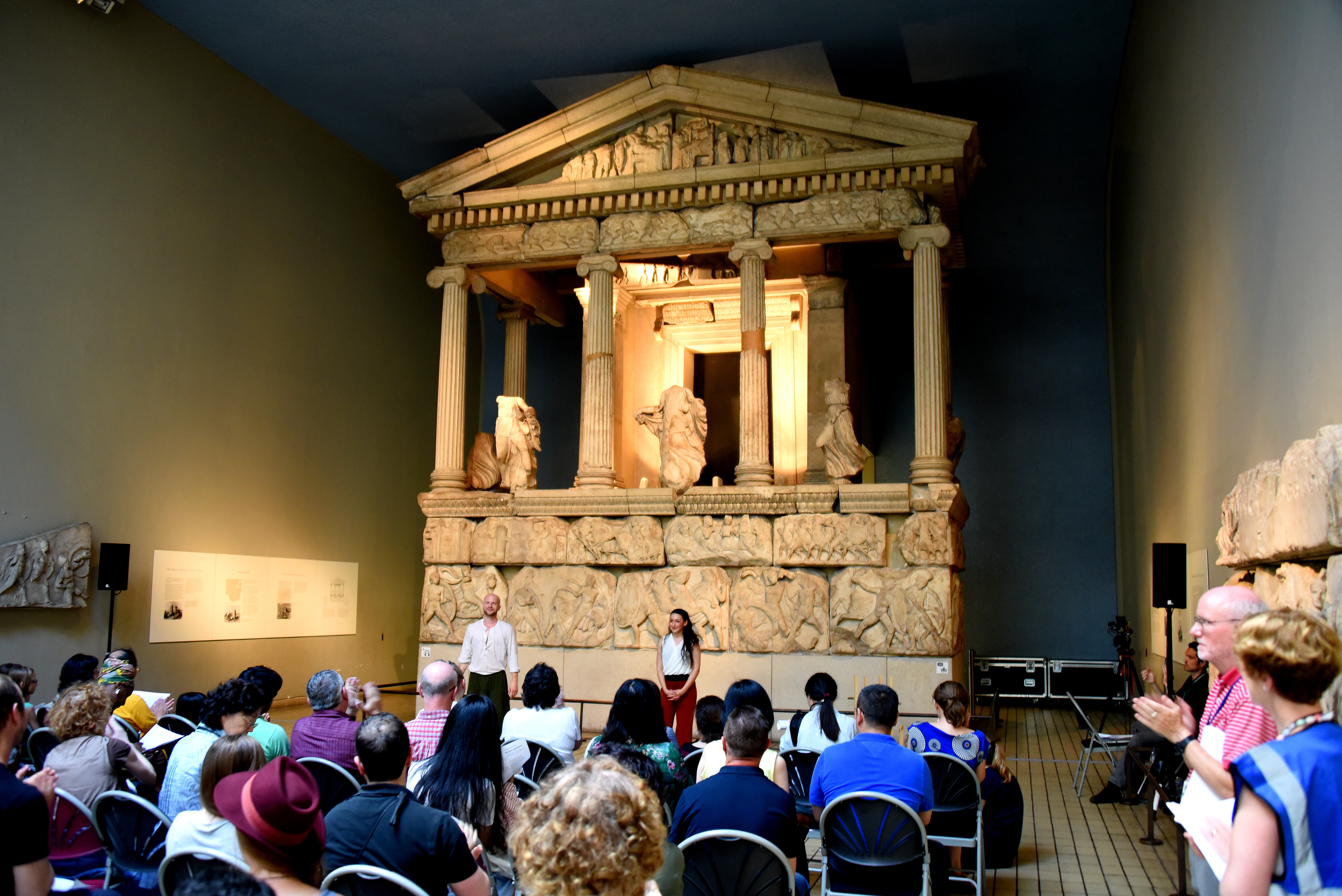
A play in front of the monument. Actors Noah Young and Genevieve Dunne.

The ruins and sculptures were rediscovered in the early 1840s by an expedition led by the British archaeologist, Charles Fellows, and also including George Scharf. Fellows' immediate conclusion was that the monument was to Harpagus, who is the main figure in Lycian history recorded by Herodotus, placing it in the 6th century BCE. Although it was soon realised that the style of the architecture and sculpture meant that it must date from at least a century later, it was only in the late 20th century that a consensus was reached that the tomb must date from around 390 to 380 BCE, and was probably the tomb of Arbinas.

Fellows arranged for the shipping of the remains to the British Museum. Without detailed records of where each item was found, the Museum had to rely on expedition drawings, marks on the stones, and the composition and style of the sculpture to estimate how the blocks and sculptures fit together. The current reconstruction of the East façade in the museum dates from 1969. It is in room 17 of the Museum, which also houses many other parts of the monument.

== See also ==
- Honoured Dead Memorial

== Sources ==
- Michailidis, Melanie (2009). "Empty Graves: The Tomb Towers of Northern Iran". In Gacek, Tomasz; Pstrusińska, Jadwiga (eds.). Proceedings of the Ninth Conference of the European Society for Central Asian Studies. Cambridge Scholars Publishing. ISBN 978-1443815024.
- Sturgeon, Mary C (2000), "From Pergamon to Hierapolis: From Theatrical "Altar" to Religious Theater", in de Grummond, Nancy Thomson; Ridgway, Brunilde Sismondo (eds.), From Pergamon to Sperlonga: sculpture and context, University of California Press, ISBN 978-0-520-22327-1
- Jenkins, Ian (2006), Greek architecture and its sculpture, Harvard University Press, ISBN 978-0-674-02388-8
