= Judith Swaddling =

British classical archaeologist

Judith Swaddling FSA

Academic work
- Discipline: Classical archaeology
- Institutions: British Museum
- Notable works: The Ancient Olympic Games

Judith Swaddling is a British classical archaeologist and the Senior Curator of Etruscan and pre-Roman Italy in the Department of Greece and Rome at the British Museum. She is particularly known for her work on the Etruscans, and the ancient Olympic Games.

== Career ==
Swaddling completed her PhD on ancient Greek statuary production. Thereafter she has focused on Etruscan studies and has spent most of her career working at the British Museum. Swaddling is an important scholar in the field of Etruscan material culture and has been responsible for organizing and collaborating on a wide variety of conferences, study days, projects, and exhibitions on the subject. Among the most prominent was the Seianti Project with John Prag.

Swaddling is also well known for her work on the ancient Olympic Games. Her publication The Ancient Olympic Games is now in its 3rd edition and has been translated into multiple languages.

== Fellowships and memberships ==
- Swaddling was elected a Fellow of the Society of Antiquaries on 10 January 1985
- Corresponding Member of the Istituto di Studi Etruschi ed Italici, Florence
- Member of the International Scientific Committee for the Corpus of Etruscan Mirrors (Corpus Speculorum Etruscorum)
- Trustee of the Sybille Haynes Fund for Etruscan and Early Italic Studies

== Radio ==
- Woman's Hour BBC Radio 4 (5 June 2007)
- The Ballad of the Games BBC Radio 2 (2012)

== Publications ==
- J. Swaddling ed. (with P. Bruschetti, B. Gialluca, P. Giulierini, S. Reynolds), Seduzione Etrusca. Dai segreti di Holkham Hall alle Meraviglie del British Museum [exhibition catalogue] (Milan: Skira, 2014)
- J. Swaddling, ‘Gli Etruschi e il British Museum’, and numerous catalogue entries, in P. Bruschetti et al. (eds) 2014, pp. 363–77.
- J. Swaddling, and S. Woodford, ‘Lokrian Ajax and the new face of Troilos: the Troilos mirror in the British Museum’, in M. D. Gentili and L. Maneschi (eds), Studi e ricerche a Tarquinia e in Etruria, Atti del Simposio Internazionale in ricordo di Francesca Romana Serra Ridgway, Tarquinia, 24–25 Settembre 2010, Mediterranea XI (2014), pp. 11–26.
- J. Swaddling, ‘Cerveteri et le British Museum’, in F. Gaultier and L. Haumesser (eds), Les Étrusques et la Méditerranée. La cité de Cerveteri, catalogue of the exhibition at Lens, Musée du Louvre-Lens, 5 décembre 2013-10 mars 2014, Rome, Palais des Expositions, 14 avril-20 juillet, 2014, Paris (Paris: Somogy, Éditions d’art, 2013), pp. 42–46.
- J. Swaddling, ‘On the gypsum figure from the Polledrara tomb and its polychromy’, in Les étrusques: un hymne à la vie, exhibition catalogue, Musée Maillol (2013), pp. 110 –11, no.100.
- J. Swaddling (with A. Harrison and C. Cartwright), ‘Olympic Victors’ Dark Ointment’, in V. Lo (ed), Perfect bodies: sports, medicine and immortality : ancient and modern British Museum Research Publication. British Museum Research Publications (London: British Museum Press, 2012), pp. 71–80
- J. Swaddling with P. Perkins (eds), Etruscan by definition. Papers in honour of Sybille Haynes British Museum Research Publication 173 (London, British Museum Press, 2009)
- J. Swaddling, ‘Shake, rattle and rôle. Sistrums in Etruria?’ (with a scientific report by J. Ambers et al.), in Swaddling and Perkins 2009, 31–47.
- J. Swaddling, The Ancient Olympic Games 3rd edition, (British Museum Press, 2008)
- J. Swaddling with L. Bonfante, Etruscan Myths (London, British Museum Press and Texas University Press, 2006)
- J. Swaddling with P. Perkins (eds), in Papers from the Etruscans Now conference held at the British Museum December 2002, published as Etruscan Studies (Journal of the Etruscan Foundation) vol. 9, 2006 and vol. 10, 2007).
- J. Swaddling with J. Prag (eds), Seianti Hanunia Tlesnasa: the Story of an Etruscan Noblewoman British Museum Research Paper 100. (London, British Museum Press, 2002)
- J. Swaddling, A catalogue of Etruscan mirrors in the British Museum Corpus Speculorum Etruscorum, Gt. Britain 1, I (London, British Museum Press, 2001)
