= Corpus Inscriptionum Etruscarum =

Etruscan text collection

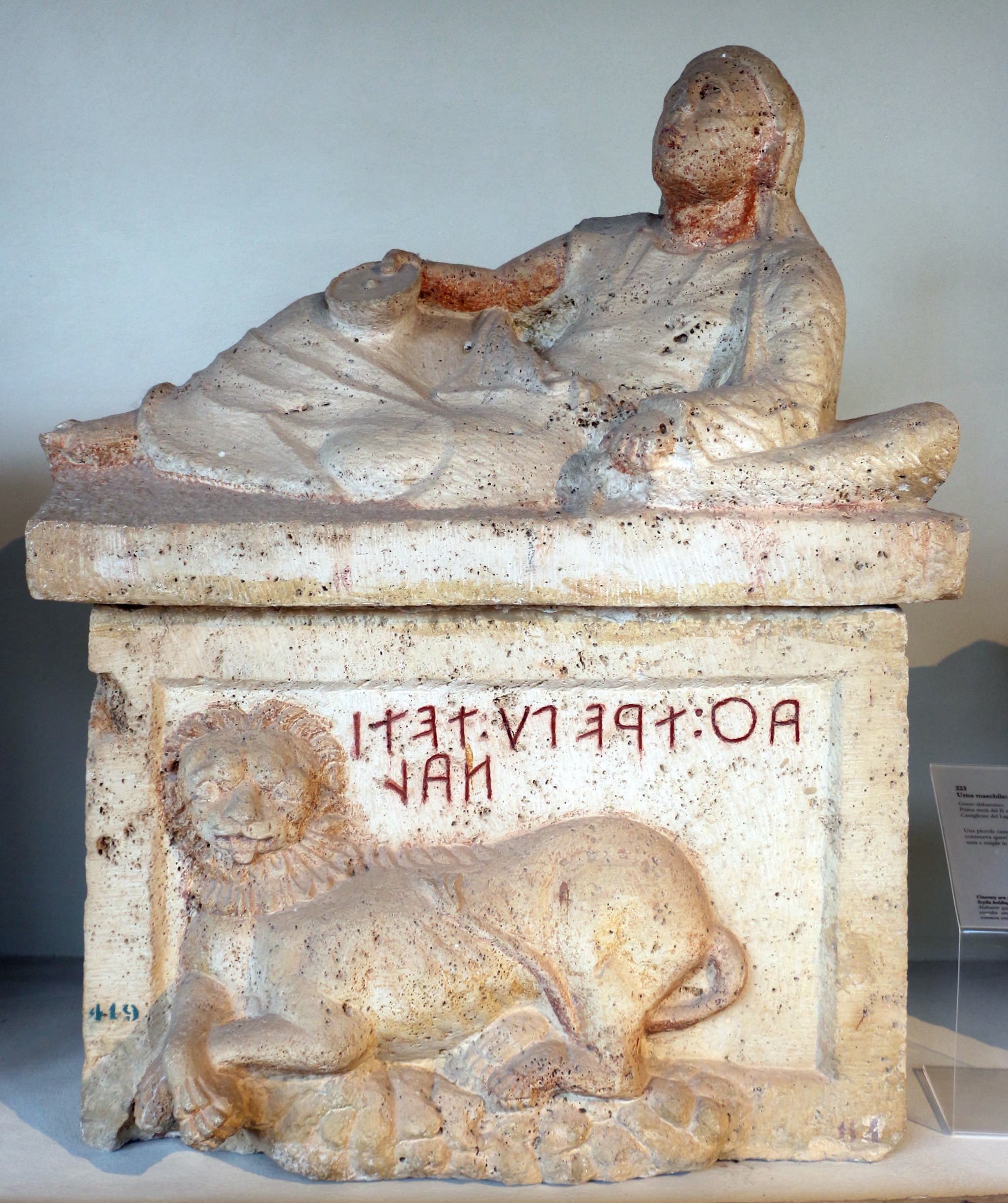
2nd century BC funerary urn with Etruscan inscription aθ trepu tetinal ('Arnth [of the family] Trepu [of the clan] Tetinal'). Bears the identifier 'CIE 4673' in the Corpus Inscriptionum Etruscarum.

The Corpus Inscriptionum Etruscarum (Body of Etruscan inscriptions) is a corpus of Etruscan texts, collected by Carl Pauli and his followers since 1885. After the death of Olof August Danielsson in 1933, this collection was passed on to the Uppsala University Library.

The CIE serves as a valuable reference index for many Etruscan texts, using a simple number system. For example, CIE 6 refers to the inscription mi avileś apianaś (I [am] of Avile Apiana.). There are other indices in existence as well.

== Numbers ==
- 1907. O. A. Danielsson. Corpus inscriptionum Etruscarum/ Vol. 2, Sect. 1, Fasc. 1, (Tit. 4918 - 5210). Lipsiae: Barth.
- 1964. Corpus inscriptionum Etruscarum 2. Sectio I: Fasc. 1 (Tit. 4918-5210); Sect. I: Fasc. 2 (Tit. 5211-5326); Sect. II. Fasc.1 (Tit. 8001-8600); Libri lintei Etrusci fragmenta Zagrabiensia. Rome: "L'Erma" di Bretschneider.
- 1923. O. A. Danielsson. Corpus inscriptionum Etruscarum/ Vol. 2, Sect. 1, Fasc. 2, (Tit. 5211 - 5326). Lipsiae : Barth.
- 1936. O. A. Danielsson ed. E. Sittig. Corpus inscriptionum Etruscarum/ Vol. 2, Sect. 1, Fasc. 3, (Tit. 5327 - 5606). Lipsiae : Barth.
- 1970. Mauro Cristofani. Corpus inscriptionum Etruscarum/ Vol. 2, Sect. 1, Fasc. 4,2, (Tit. 5607 - 6324) : 2, Tabulae et indices. Lipsiae: Barth.
- 1996. Maristella Pandolfini Angeletti. Corpus Inscriptionum Etruscarum / Voluminis Secundi / [Sect II], Fasciculum 2, Tit. 8601-8880, Inscriptiones et in Latio et in Campania repertae. Romae : Istituto per l'archeologia etrusco-italica del Consiglio nazionale delle ricerche.
- Carl Eugen Pauli and Maristella Pandolfini Angeletti. Corpus inscriptionum Etruscarum/ Vol. 3, Fasc. 1, (Tit. 10001 - 10520): Inscriptiones in instrumento et Tarquiniis et in Agro Tarquiniensi repertae vol. 3, fasc. 1. Romae : Consiglio nazionale delle richerche, 1982.
- 1987. Iuliana Magini Carella Prada et Maristella Pandolfini Angeletti. Corpus inscriptionum Etruscarum/ Vol., 3, Fasc. 2, (Tit. 10521 - 10950): Inscriptiones in instrumento et Volsiniis et in Agro Volsiniensi repertae. Lipsiae: Barth.
- 2004. Adriano Maggiani. Corpus inscriptionum Etruscarum/ Vol. 3, Fasc. 4, (Tit. 11539 - 12113): Inscriptiones in instrumento et Rusellis et Vetuloniae et in earum agris repertae. Lipsiae : Barth.
- 2006. Giovanni Colonna, Daniele F. Maras, Corpus Inscriptionum Etruscarum, Academiis Litterarum Borussica et Saxonica legatum, Carolus Pauli primum edidit. Voluminis secundi, Instituti Studiis Etruscis et Italicis Provehendis et Academiae Scientiarum Berolinensis et Brandenburgensis communi opera et studio resumpti prolatique, Instituto Studiis de Gentibus Italiae Marisque Mediterranei Antiqui Provehendis Italicis Scientiis Pervestigandis Consilii curante. Sectionis I, Fasciculum 5 (Tit. 6325-6723) et additamentum Sectionis II, Fasciculi 1 (Tit. 8881-8927). Inscriptiones Veiis et in agro veientano, nepesino sutrinoque repertae, additis illis in agro capenate et falisco inventis, quae in fasciculo CIE II, 2, 1 desunt, nec non illis perpaucis in finitimis sabinis repertis. Pisa-Rome: Istituti Editoriali e Poligrafici Internazionali. Pp. viii, 140; figs. 37, b/w pls. ISBN 978-88-8147-452-3. Review by J. M. Turfa. Bryn Mawr Classical Review 2007.07.04

== See also ==
- Corpus Speculorum Etruscorum
- Thesaurus Linguae Etruscae
- Etruscan language
- Epigraphy
