= Larissa Bonfante =

Italian-American archaeologist and Etruscologist

- Born: March 27, 1931; Naples, Italy
- Died: August 23, 2019 (aged 88); New York City, New York, United States
- Education: Barnard College (BA); University of Cincinnati (MA); Columbia University (PhD)
- Parent: Giuliano Bonfante

Larissa Bonfante (March 27, 1931 – August 23, 2019) was an Italian-American classicist, Professor of Classics emerita at New York University and an authority on Etruscan language and culture.

== Biography ==
Bonfante was born in Naples, the daughter of professor Giuliano Bonfante. She grew up in Princeton, New Jersey. Bonfante would go on to study fine arts and classics at Barnard College, earning her BA in 1954; she completed her MA in classics from the University of Cincinnati in 1957 and her PhD in art history and archaeology at Columbia University in 1966. She studied at Columbia with Otto Brendel. Bonfante received the Gold Medal Award for Distinguished Archaeological Achievement in 2007 from the Archaeological Institute of America. She was a founding member of the American section of the Istituto Nazionale di Studi Etruschi ed Italici. She edited the periodical publication Etruscan News that reported on the activities of the American section. In 2009, Bonfante was elected as a member of the American Philosophical Society.

== Endowed lectureship ==
The Archaeological Institute of America created an endowment fund to raise monies to support a lecture in Bonfante's honor as part of its lecture program. The inaugural named lecture was delivered by Dr. Jean Turfa on March 21, 2021, for the Staten Island society of the AIA.

== Selected publications ==
- 1970. "Roman Triumphs and Etruscan Kings: The Changing Face of the Triumph." Journal of Roman Studies 60:49-66.
- 1975. Etruscan dress. Baltimore: Johns Hopkins University Press. Reviews: American Journal of Archaeology 81.2:253-254
- 1979. The Plays of Hrotswitha of Gandersheim. translator, with Alexandra Bonfante-Warren.
- 1981. Out of Etruria : Etruscan influence north and south. Oxford: BAR. ISBN 9780860541219
- (with Giuliano Bonfante) The Etruscan language: an introduction, 1983
- 1986. ed. Etruscan life and afterlife: a handbook of Etruscan studies. Wayne State University Press.
- 1989. "Nudity as a Costume in Classical Art." American Journal of Archaeology 93.4:543-70.
- 1990. Reading The Past Etruscan. Berkeley: University of California Press.
- 1997 Corpus Speculorum Etruscorum USA / 3, New York, the Metropolitan Museum of Art. Ames, Iowa: Iowa State University Press.
- 2001. Italy and Cyprus in antiquity, 1500-450 BC : proceedings of an international symposium held at the Italian Academy for Advanced Studies in America at Columbia University, November 16–18, 2000. Nicosia: Costakis and Leto Severis Foundation.
- 2006. (with Judith Swaddling) Etruscan myths. University of Texas Press.
- 2006. (with Blair Fowlkes). Classical antiquities at New York University. Rome: "L'Erma" di Bretschneider.
- 2011. The barbarians of ancient Europe: realities and interactions. Cambridge University Press.
- 2013. The Plays of Hrotswitha of Gandersheim. Bilingual Edition.
- 2016. The Collection of Antiquities of the American Academy in Rome. University of Michigan Press. ISBN 978-0-472-11989-9

== Necrology ==
- "Larissa Bonfante morta a New York: l'archeologa era tra le maggiori specialiste di Etruschi" Il Messaggero (31 August 2019)
- "Addio all'archeologa napoletana Larissa Bonfante: fu insigne etruscologa" Il Mattino.it (31 August 2019)
- In memoriam statement published by the Archaeological Institute of America, authored by Jean MacIntosh Turfa (6 September 2019).
- "In Memoriam: Larissa Bonfante (1931–2019)" in Etruscan and Italic Studies 22:1-2 (12 Nov 2019) authored by Nancy de Grummond.
- Commemoration in Etruscan News v. 22 (Winter 2020) published by New York University.
