= Erika Simon =

German classical archaeologist (1927–2019)

Erika Simon (27 June 1927 – 15 February 2019) was a German scholar of classical archaeology and professor emeritus of the University of Würzburg. She was elected to the American Philosophical Society in 2002. Simon died in February 2019 at the age of 91.

== Selected writings ==
- 1968 Ara Pacis Augustae
- 1969 The Gods of the Greek (Hirmer, Munich)
- 1983 Festivals of Attica: an Archaeological Commentary
- 2006 The Religion of the Etruscans (co-editor with Nancy Thomson de Grummond)
