= Kuprlli =

5th-century BC dynast of Lycia

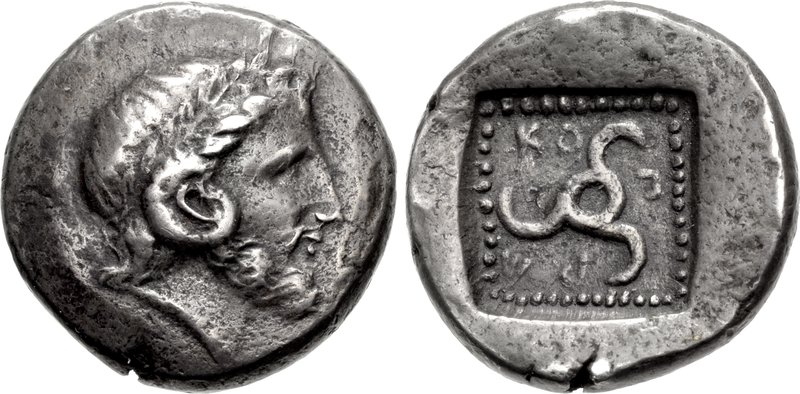
- Coinage of Kuprlli. Head of Karneios or Zeus-Ammon and Triskeles. KO-Π-P(ΛΛ) around. Circa 480-440 BC.
- Military career
- Allegiance: Achaemenid Empire
- Service years: fl. 480 – 440 BC
- Rank: Dynast of Lycia

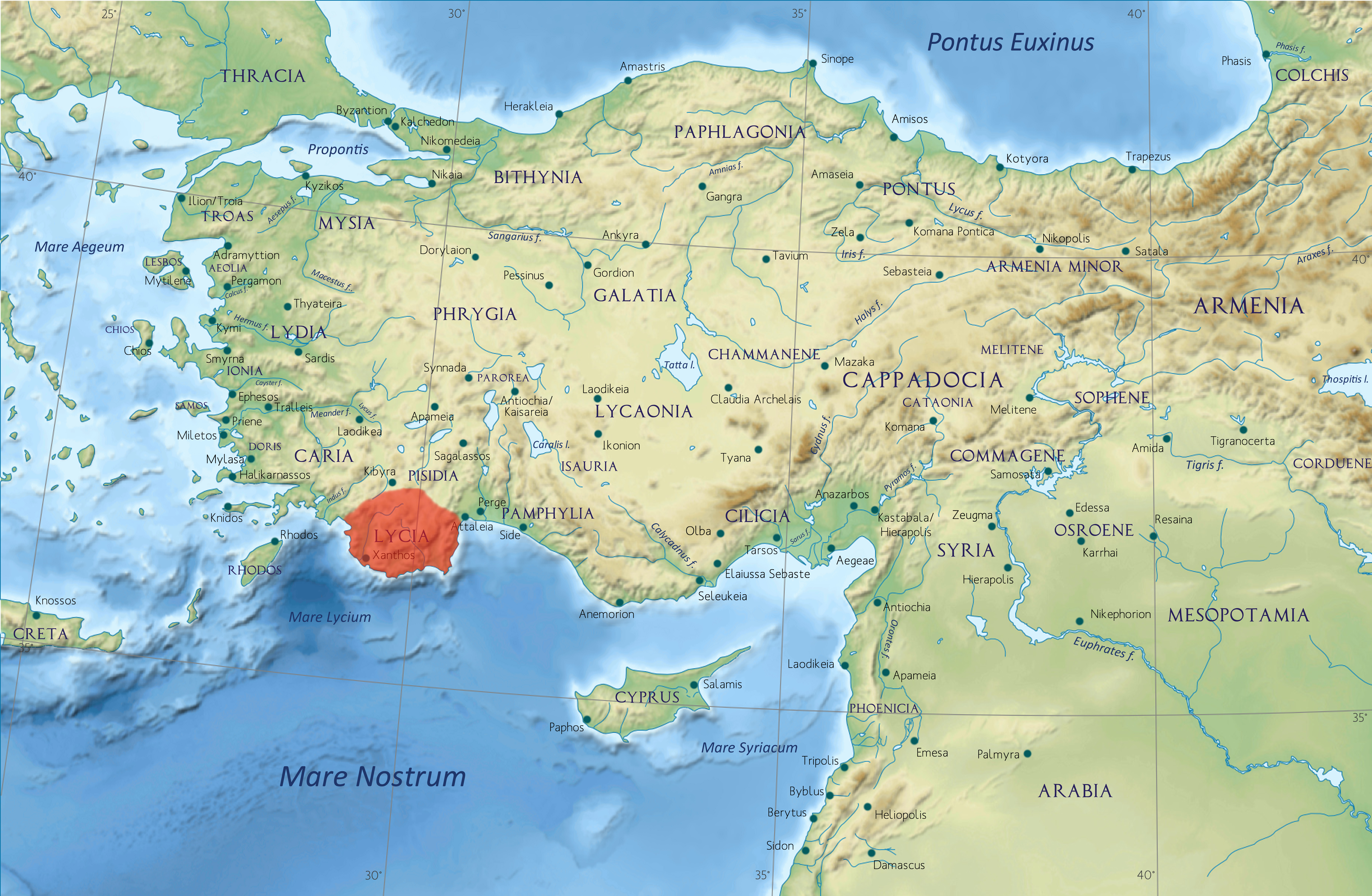
Location of Lycia. Anatolia/Asia Minor in the Greco-Roman period. The classical regions, including Lycia, and their main settlements

Kuprlli (in Lycian KO𐊓PΛΛE, circa 480-440 BC) was a dynast of Lycia, at a time when this part of Anatolia was subject to the Persian, or Achaemenid, Empire. Kuprlli ruled at the time of the Athenian alliance, the Delian League.

Present-day knowledge of Lycia in the period of classical antiquity comes mostly from archaeology, in which this region is unusually rich. There is evidence of a fire that destroyed the wooden tombs and temples of Xanthos in around 470 BC. This fire was probably caused by Cimon of Athens when he attacked the sacred citadel in retaliation for the destruction of the Athenian Acropolis by the Persians and their allies, including the Lycians, in 480 BC. The Xanthians, under their dynast, Kuprlli, rebuilt the buildings in stone, which are reflected in the numerous Tombs of Xanthos visible today.

== Coinage ==
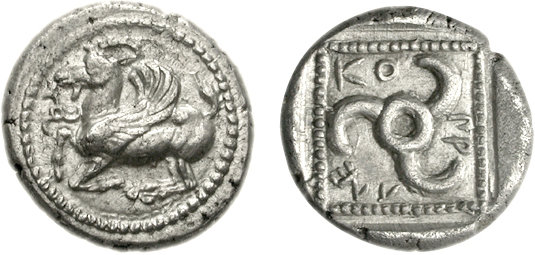
Coinage of Kuprlli. Circa 470-440 BC.

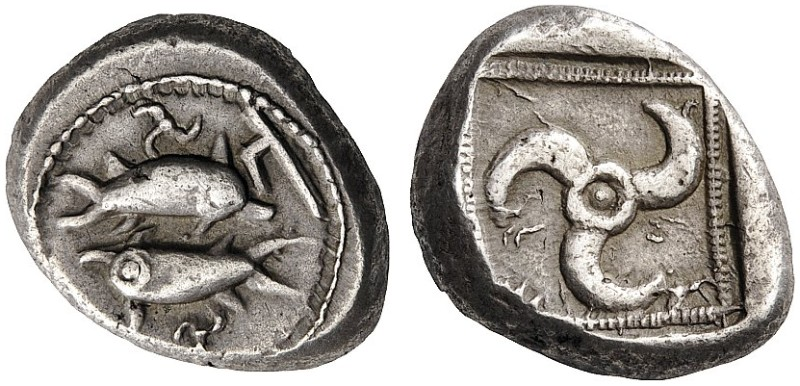
Coinage of Kuprlli c. 470-440 BC

== Sources ==
- Jenkins, Ian (2006), Greek architecture and its sculpture, Harvard University Press, ISBN 978-0-674-02388-8
