= Olof August Danielsson =

Swedish linguist and classical philologist (1852–1933)

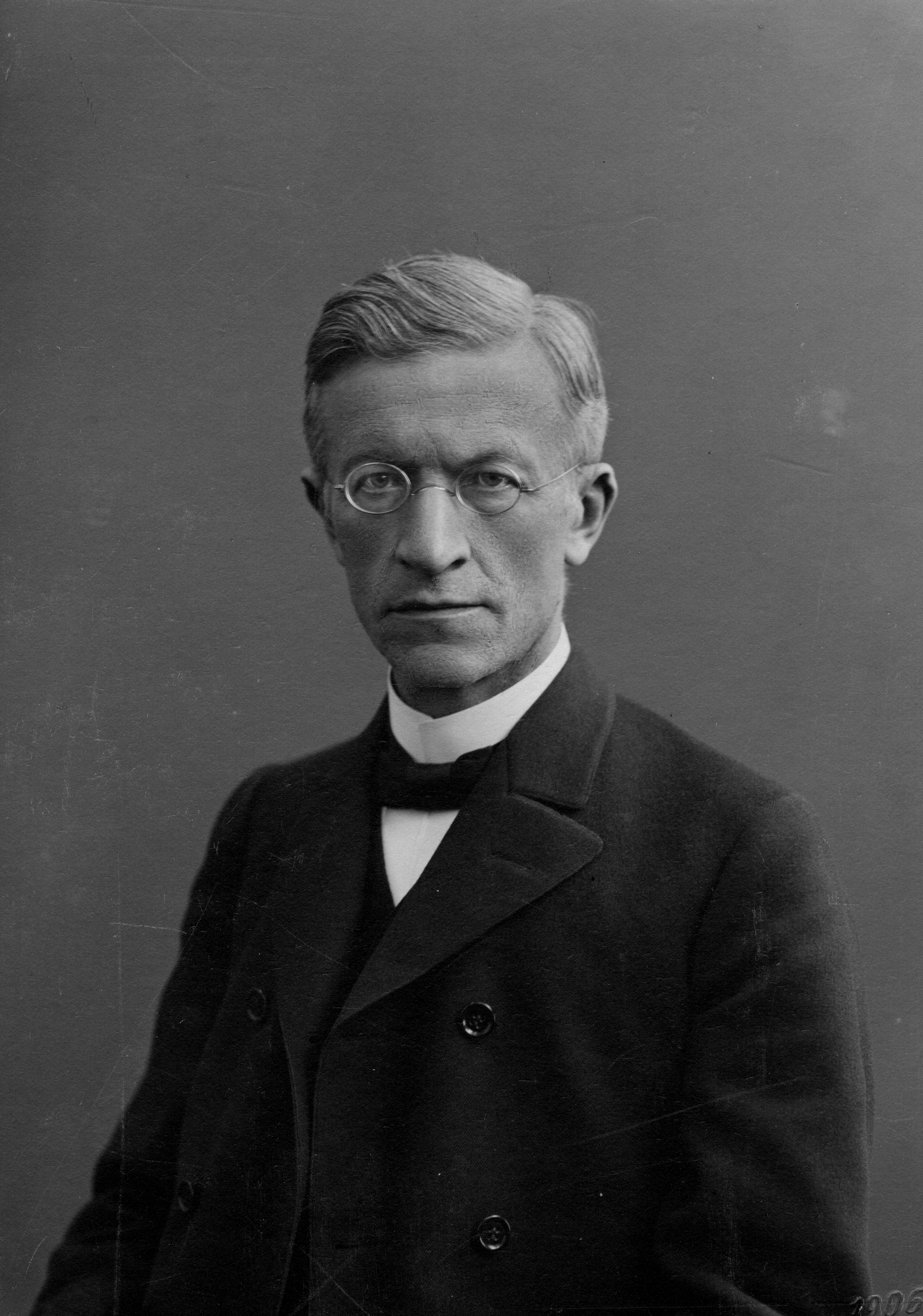
Olof August Danielsson

Olof August Danielsson (born 15 October 1852 in the District Hamari parish, Östergötland County; died 10 July 1933) was a Swedish linguist and classical philologist.

Olof August Danielsson was born to Daniel Danielsson, a shoemaker, and Anna Brita Olofsdotter.

In 1870 Danielsson began his studies in Uppsala. In 1879 he was associate professor of Classical Languages at the university in Uppsala, and was professor of comparative linguistics (1883–1884) and Greek language and literature (1884–1891). He was appointed professor of classical languages at University of Gothenburg, although he never took up the appointment, becoming professor of Greek language and literature at Uppsala University instead. Danielsson was elected as a member of the Academy of Letters in 1901 and the Royal Academy of Sciences in 1905. Danielsson was unmarried.

Danielson was a leading Etruscologist and resided at various times in Italy to examine and copy Etruscan inscriptions. Together with Carl Pauli he launched the Corpus Inscriptionum Etruscarum, which began to appear in 1893.

== See also ==
- Corpus Inscriptionum Etruscarum

== Sources ==
- Danielsson, Olof August in the MIME type (second edition, 1906)
