= Arbinas =

Late 5th-century BC Lycian dynast

- Erbinas
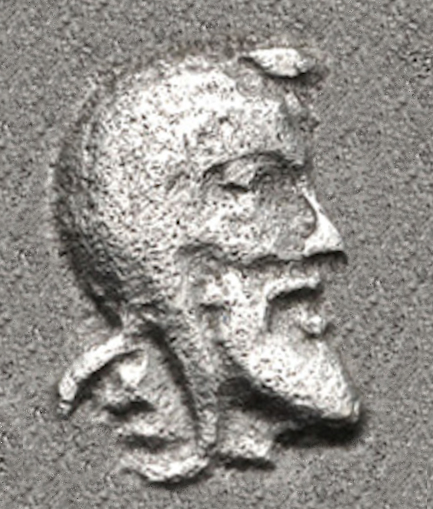
- Portrait of Arbinas wearing the satrapal headdress, from his coinage.
- Military career
- Allegiance: Achaemenid Empire
- Rank: Satrap

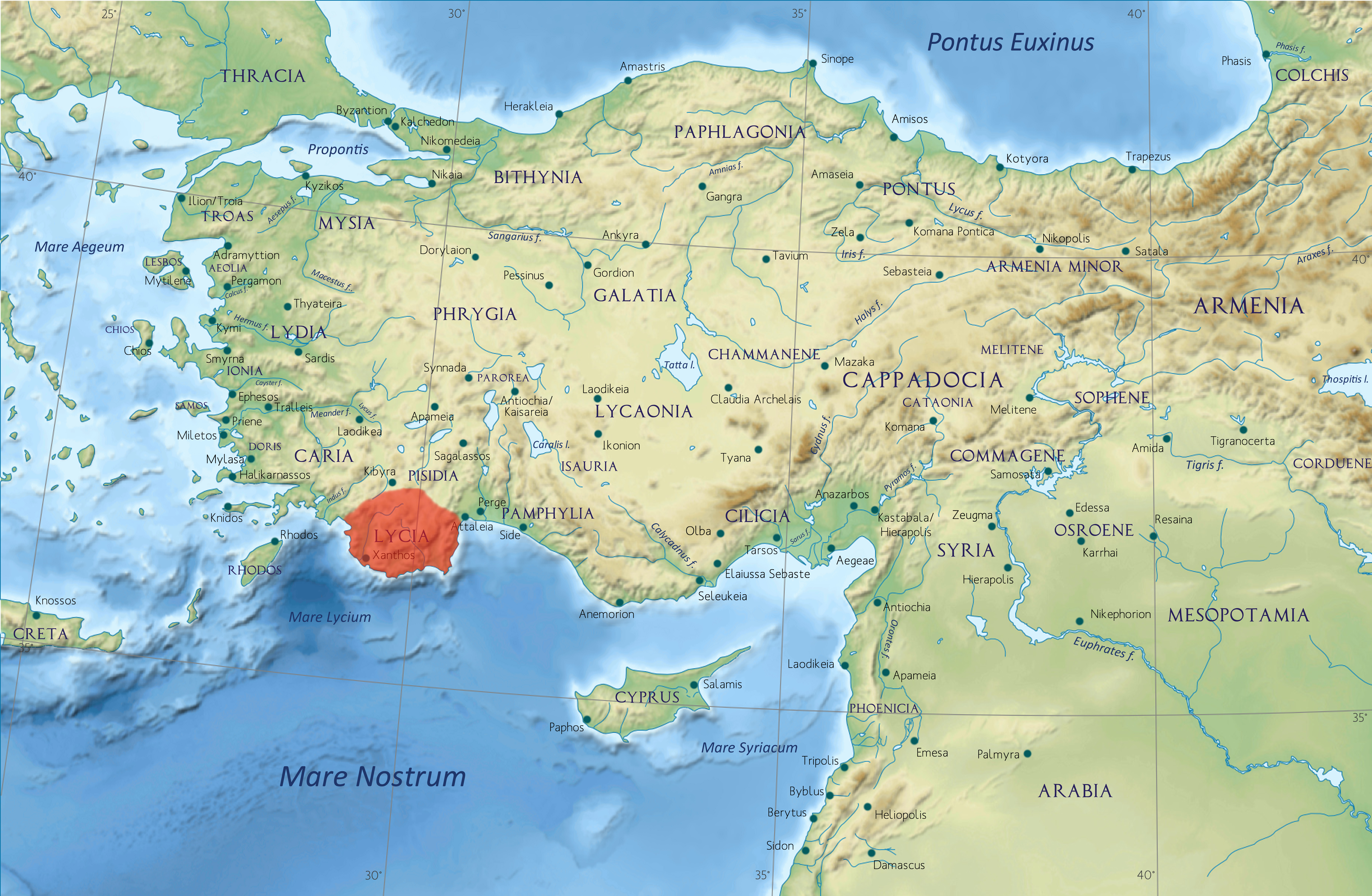
Location of Lycia. Anatolia/Asia Minor in the Greco-Roman period. The classical regions, including Lycia, and their main settlements

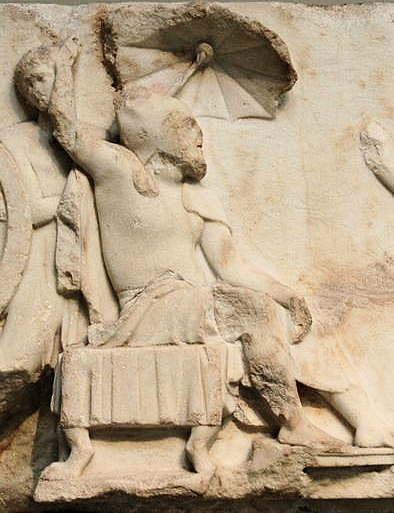
Arbinas, in Achaemenid dress on the Nereid Monument.

Arbinas, also Erbinas, Erbbina, was a Lycian Dynast who ruled circa 430/20-400 BCE. He is most famous for his tomb, the Nereid Monument, now on display in the British Museum. Coinage seems to indicate that he ruled in the western part of Lycia, around Telmessos, while his tomb was established in Xanthos. He was a subject of the Achaemenid Empire.

== Rule ==
He was the son of the previous Lycian king Kheriga. On his inscriptions, Erbinas is described as a tyrannos, and "the man who rules over the Lycians".

It seems the Lycia kingdom started to disintegrate during the rule of Arbinas, as numerous smaller rulers started to mint coinage throughout Lycia during his reign and after.

== Tomb ==
His monumental tomb, the Nereid Monument, now in the British Museum, was the main inspiration for the famous Mausoleum at Halicarnassus. Using the design of a Greek Temple for the building of a tomb was unheard of in mainland Greece. According to Melanie Michailidis, though bearing a "Greek appearance", the Nereid Monument, the Harpy Tomb and the Tomb of Payava were built according main Zoroastrian criteria "by being composed of thick stone, raised on plinths off the ground, and having single windowless chambers". The Nereid Monument was the main inspiration for the famous Mausoleum at Halicarnassus.

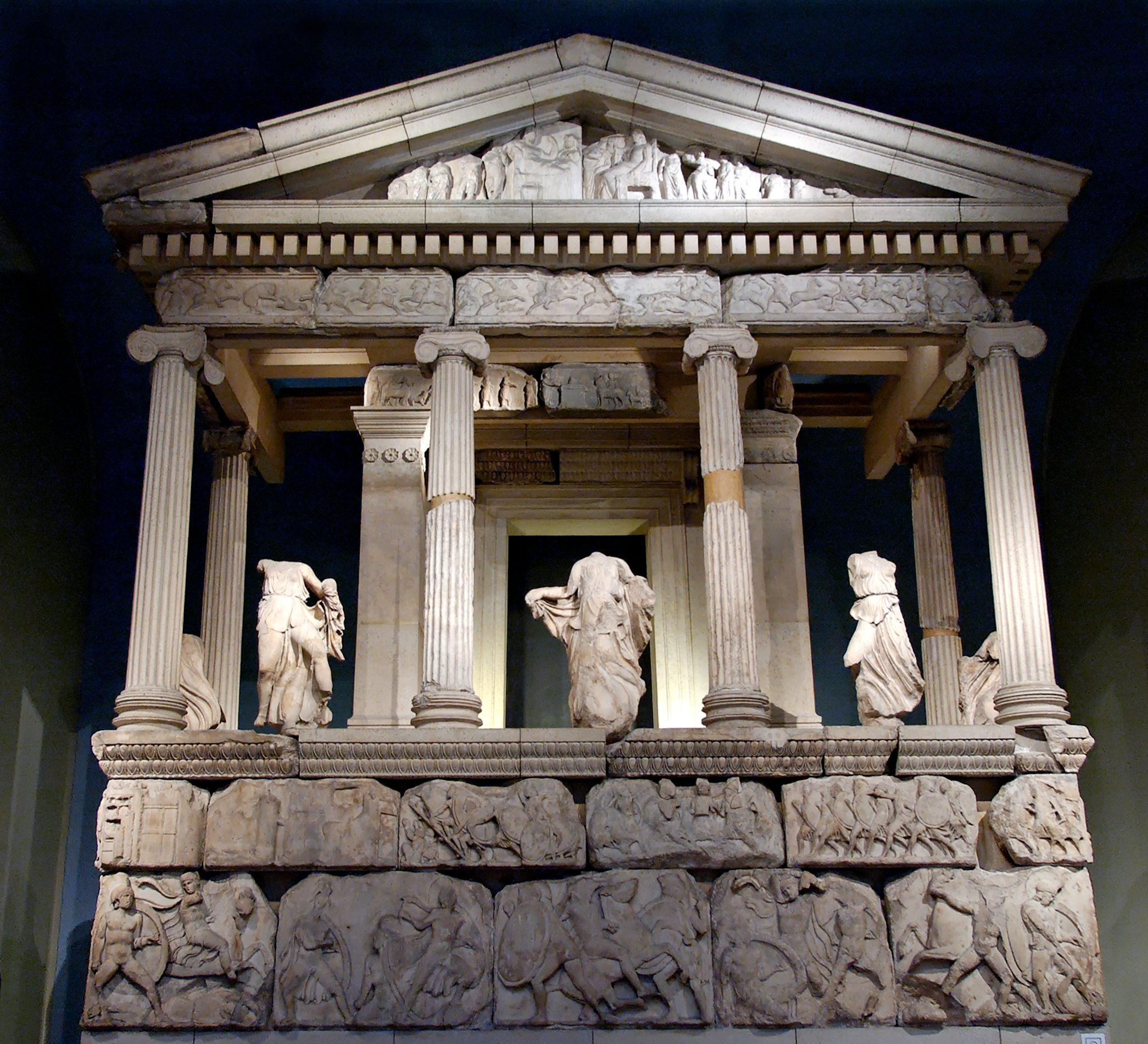
The Nereid Monument is thought to be the tomb of Arbinas. British Museum.

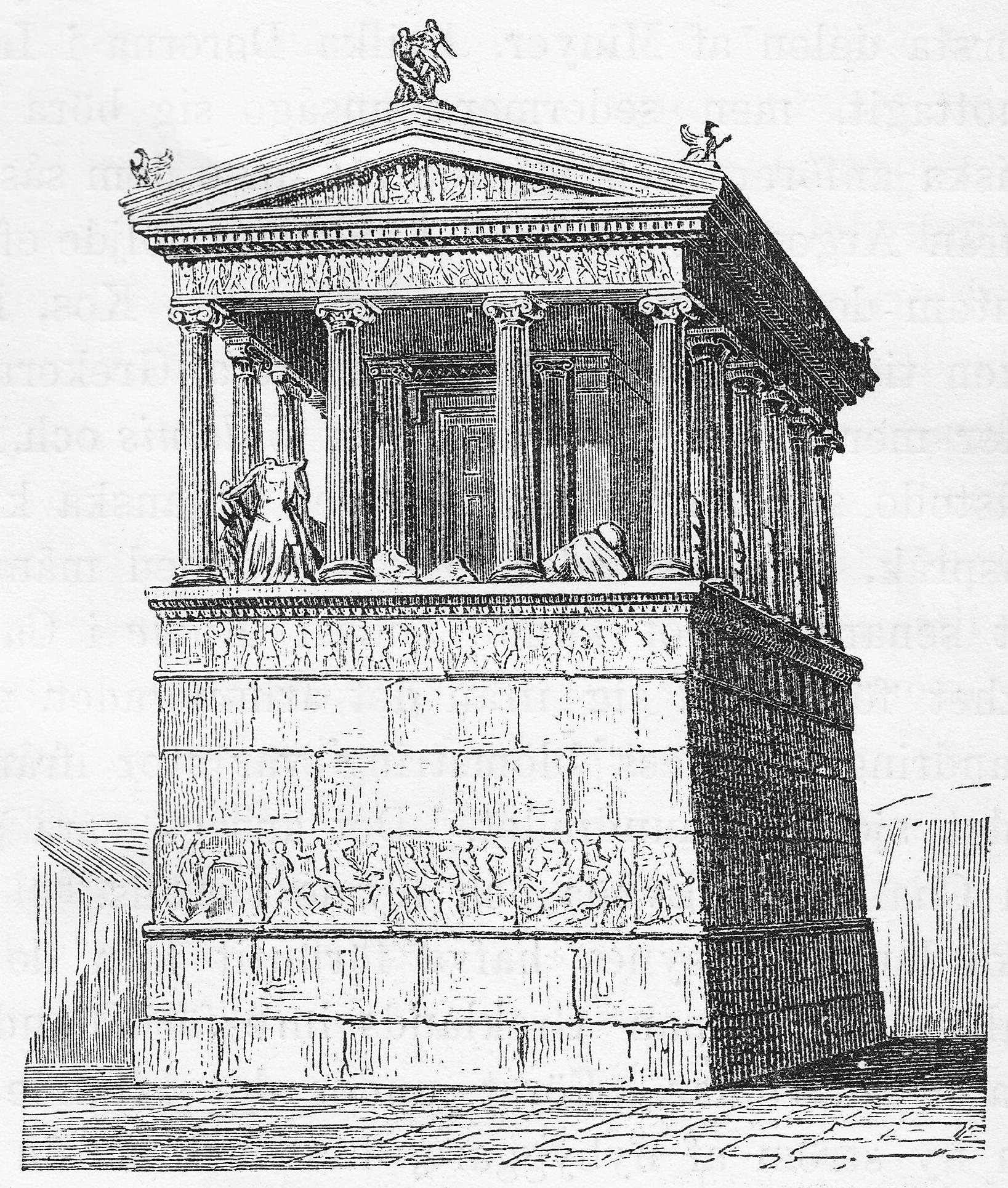
Reconstitution of the original tomb of Erbinas.

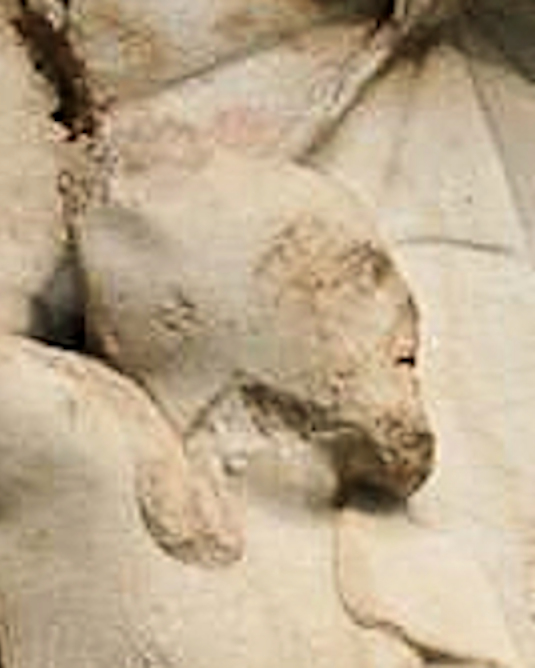
Arbinas portrait. Nereid Monument.

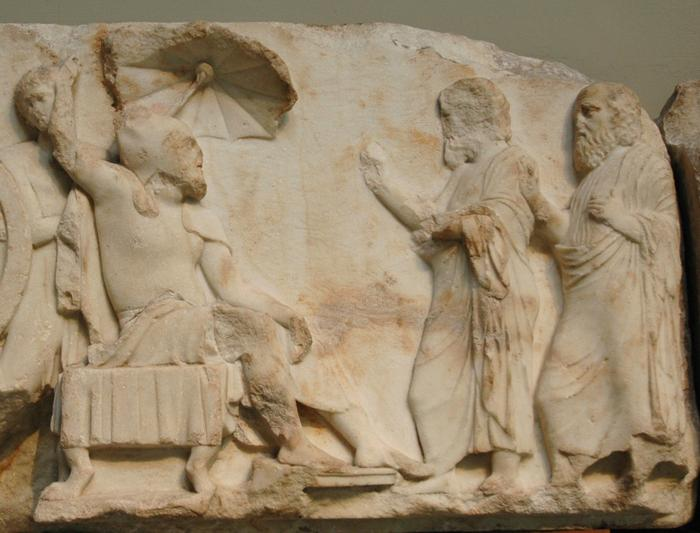
Arbinas receives emissaries. Nereid Monument.

== Coinage ==
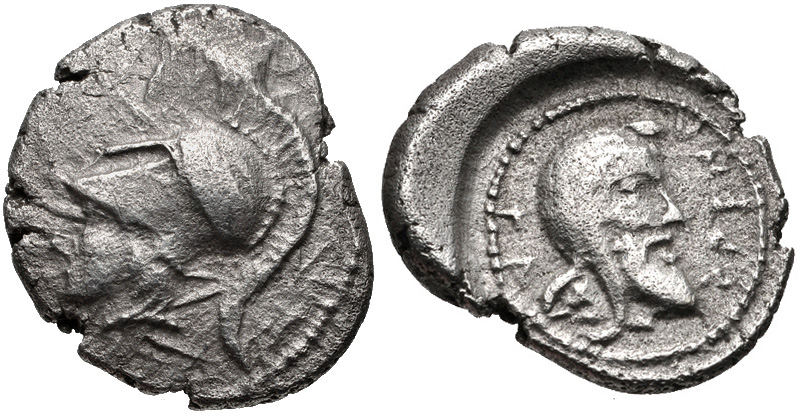
Coin of King Arbinas, wearing the Phrygian cap on the reverse. Circa 430/20-400 BC

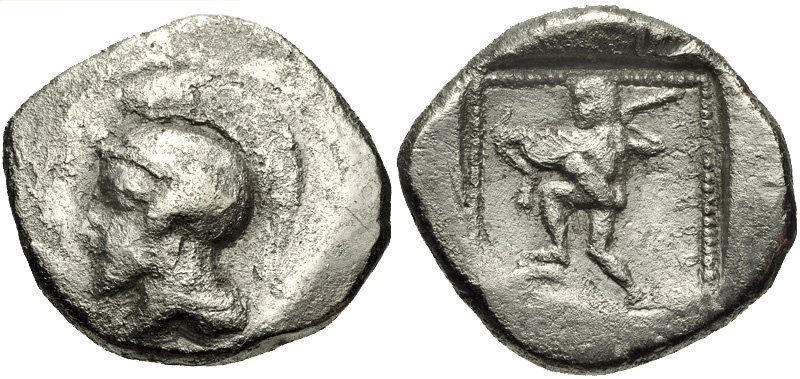
Coin of King Arbinas. Athena and Herakles on each side. Circa 430/20-400 BC

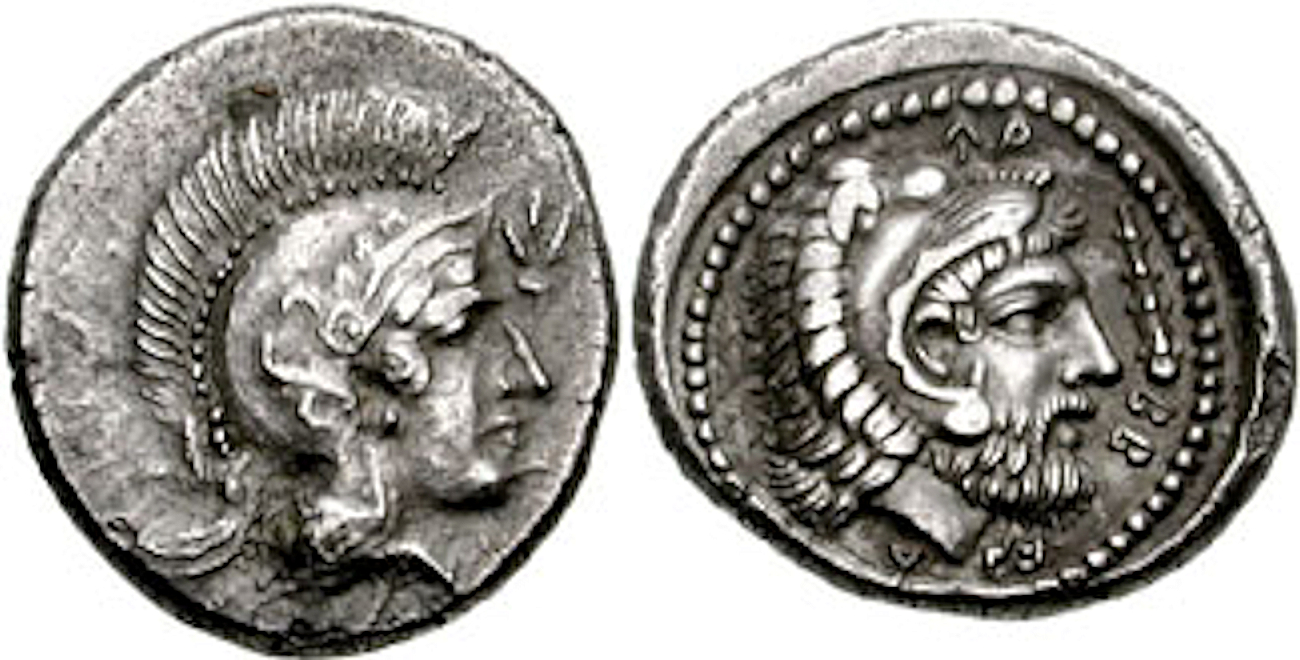
Coin of King Arbinas. Athena and Herakles.

== Sources ==
- Michailidis, Melanie (2009). "Empty Graves: The Tomb Towers of Northern Iran". In Gacek, Tomasz; Pstrusińska, Jadwiga (eds.). Proceedings of the Ninth Conference of the European Society for Central Asian Studies. Cambridge Scholars Publishing. ISBN 978-1443815024.
