= Giuliano Bonfante =

Italian linguist (1904–2005)

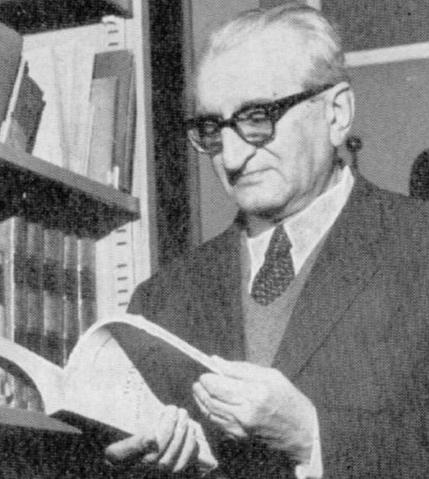
- Bonfante c. 1975
- Born: 6 August 1904; Milan, Italy
- Died: 9 September 2005 (aged 101); Rome, Lazio, Italy
- Children: Larissa
- Parent: Pietro Bonfante

Giuliano Bonfante (6 August 1904 – 9 September 2005) was an Italian linguist and expert on the language of the Etruscans and other Italic peoples. He was professor of linguistics at the University of Genoa and then at the University of Turin.

Bonfante was born in Milan, the son of jurist Pietro Bonfante. He collaborated with his daughter, Larissa Bonfante, in his study of the Etruscan language. He became a member of the Accademia dei Lincei in 1958.

He died in Rome.

== Bibliography ==
- Della intonazione sillabica indoeuropea (1930)
- I dialetti indoeuropei (Naples, 1931)
- Storia del diritto romano 2 v. (1958–59)
- Latini e Germani in Italia (Brescia, 1965)
- La dottrina neolinguistica (Turin, 1970)
- Studi romeni (Rome, 1973)
- La protopatria degli Slavi (Wrocław, 1984)
- Grammatica latina: per le Scuole Medie Superiori (Milan, 1987)
- Lingua e cultura degli Etruschi (1985)
- La lingua parlata in Orazio (1994)
- The origin of the Romance Languages: Stages in the Development of Latin (1999)
- The Etruscan language: an introduction (1983; rev. ed. 2002)

== Necrology ==
- http://titus.uni-frankfurt.de/curric/necrolog.htm
- http://www.ilmanifesto.it/Quotidiano-archivio/10-Settembre-2005/art84.html
