= Tombs at Xanthos =

Tomb complex in Turkey

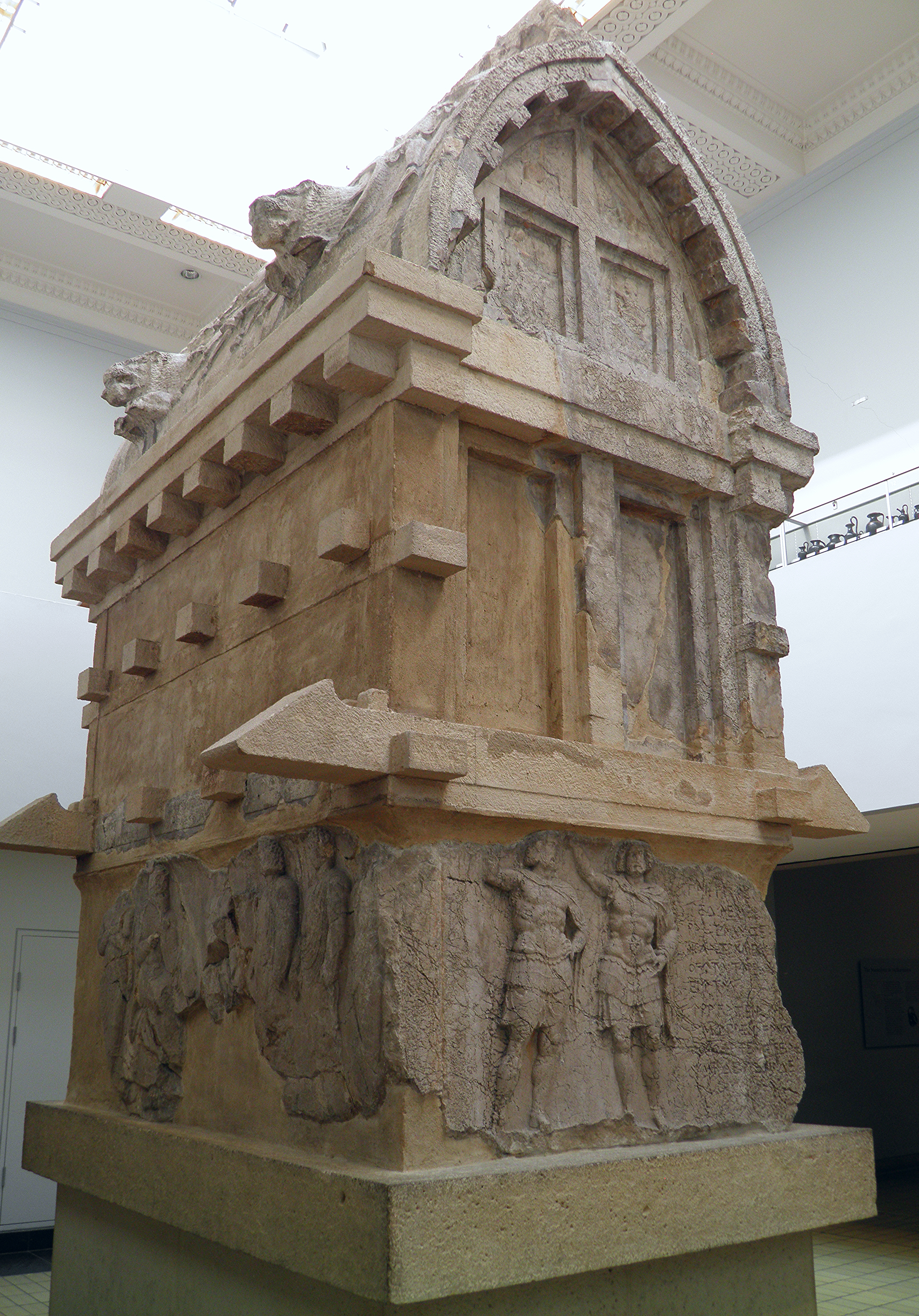
The tomb of Payava, a Lykian aristocrat, about 375–360 BCE, from Xanthos, British Museum.

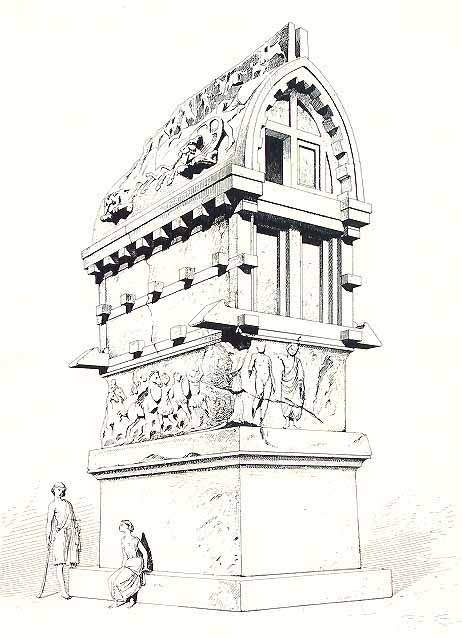
Reconstruction drawing of the tomb by Viollet-le-Duc, with complete base.

Xanthos, also called Xanthus, was a chief city state of the Lycians, an indigenous people of southwestern Anatolia (present-day Turkey). Many of the tombs at Xanthos are pillar tombs, formed of a stone burial chamber on top of a large stone pillar. The body would be placed in the top of the stone structure, elevating it above the landscape. The tombs are for men who ruled in a Lycian dynasty from the mid-6th century to the mid-4th century BCE and help to show the continuity of their power in the region. Not only do the tombs serve as a form of monumentalization to preserve the memory of the rulers, but they also reveal the adoption of Greek style of decoration.

Xanthos was an important city state governed by a king, ruling under an Achaemenid Empire governor. The continuity of the dynastic rule in Xanthos was shown through a tradition of building pillar tombs. When these tombs were made, predominant Late Classical Greek ideas of art pervaded Lycian imagery. The tombs moved away from the local tradition and started to display the facades of pillared Greek Temples following the resurgence of Greek influence in the erea, from the 2nd quarter of the 4th century BCE (375–350 BCE).

Several tombs were excavated by Sir Charles Fellows, an Englishman who excavated in the Levant and Asia Minor, and were transported to the British Museum in 1848 CE.

== Monumental pillar tombs ==
=== Lion Pillar ===
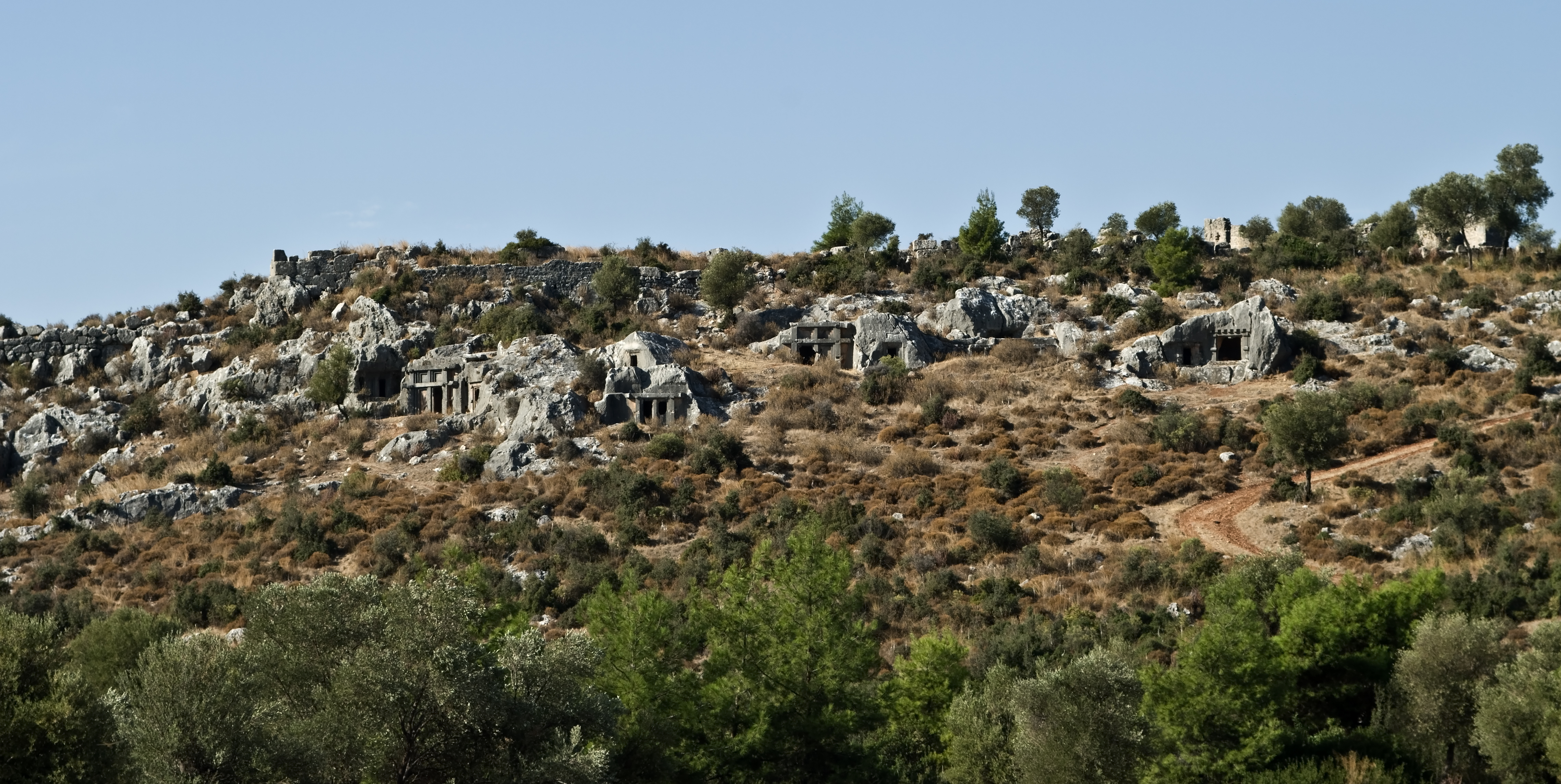
Lycian tombs in Xanthos.

The Lion Pillar, named because of the large lion in high relief, was located east of the Acropolis of Xanthos and stands around 3 metres (9.8 ft) high. The stone chest is of white limestone, carved to fit the body. It has been postulated that this tomb was created between the early- and mid-6th century BCE. Contrast is created between the high relief sculpture on the ends and the low relief sculpture in the centre of the chest. The details of the friezes indicate that the craftsmen were Greek, as revealed by the depictions of the human form on the West side of the chest. A lion is held by a man, whose body simply delineated: nude and with few defining curves. His archaic smile and hair falling in locks are indications of a strong Archaic Greek style.

On the south side of the front of the chest is the figure of a recumbent lion, carved in high relief. The lion is facing left, its body contained within the end of the block. The small head of a bull, who has been pinned by the lion, rests between its paws. Below the bull was a tablet, the inscription on which has faded. The north side of the monument features more imagery of lions, in a position of caring for young, as a lion interacts with her cubs. The carving technique used in this relief is similar to the one used on the south side of the frieze, with the details and outline of the form delineated by use of line. The lion on the east side is thinner looking.

On the east side of the monument, the composition is broken up into registers, the lower half remaining undecorated and the upper half most likely containing a low relief frieze. However, the complete length of the top frieze is unknown because part of it has broken off, limiting the information that can be gained from the images. On the left part of the east side of the monument, militaristic scenes in low relief depict soldiers with a shield, a Corinthian helmet, and a weapon. On the right side of the frieze is a horseman, dressed in a short cloak and a helmet, accompanied by an attendant wearing a chiton, a Greek-style tunic, and carrying a spear.

The unique iconography used in the monument has received much scholarly attention. It was meant to express legitimacy of the tomb's owner as well as his association to the Achaemenids. The Archaic pillar tomb itself, which is the oldest example of an architectural style unique to Lycia, alludes to his Lycian origin. Seyer concludes that the owner was probably a Lycian inaugurated as the first local ruler under the Achaemenids.

=== Harpy Tomb ===
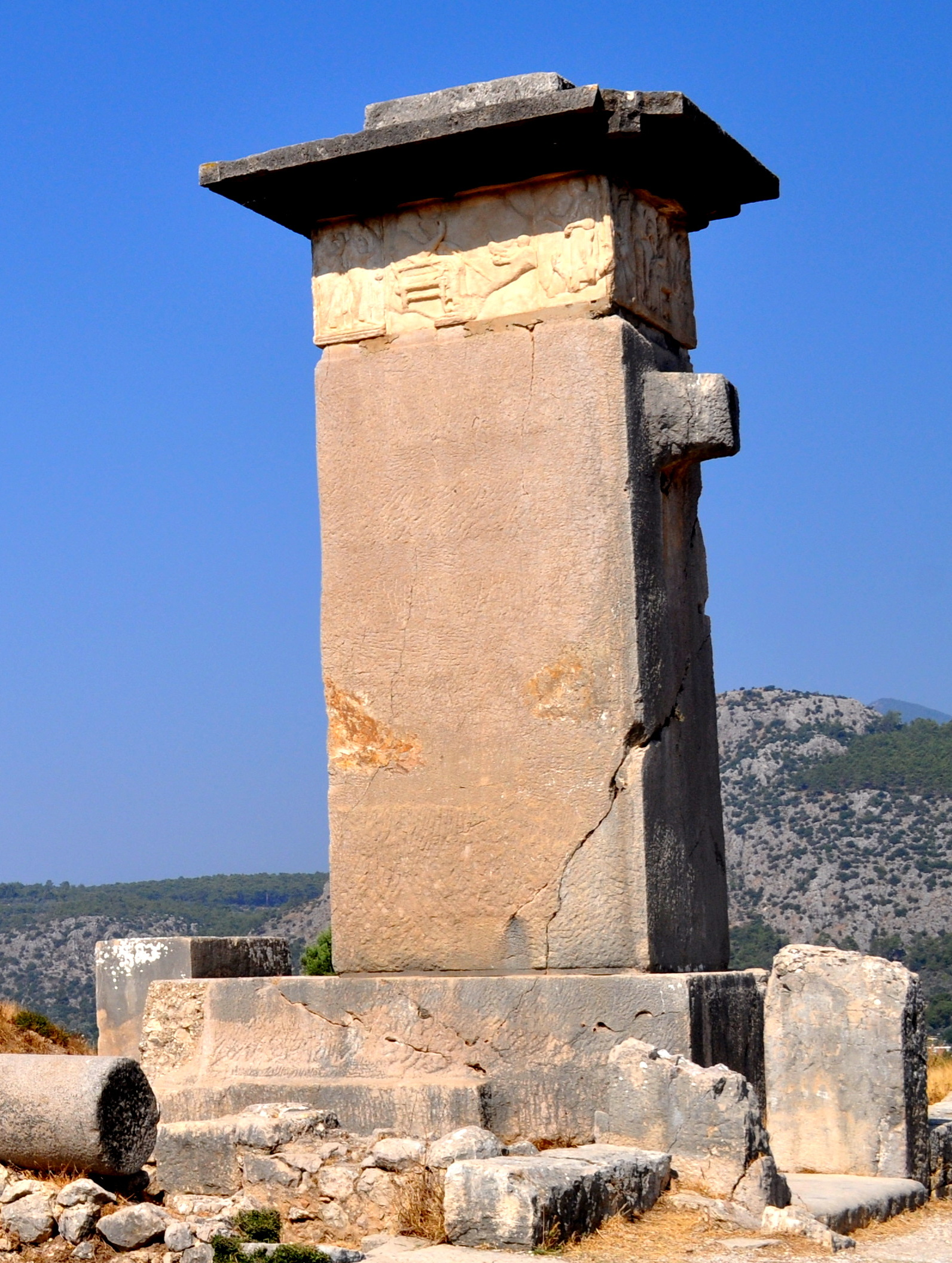
The Harpy Tomb

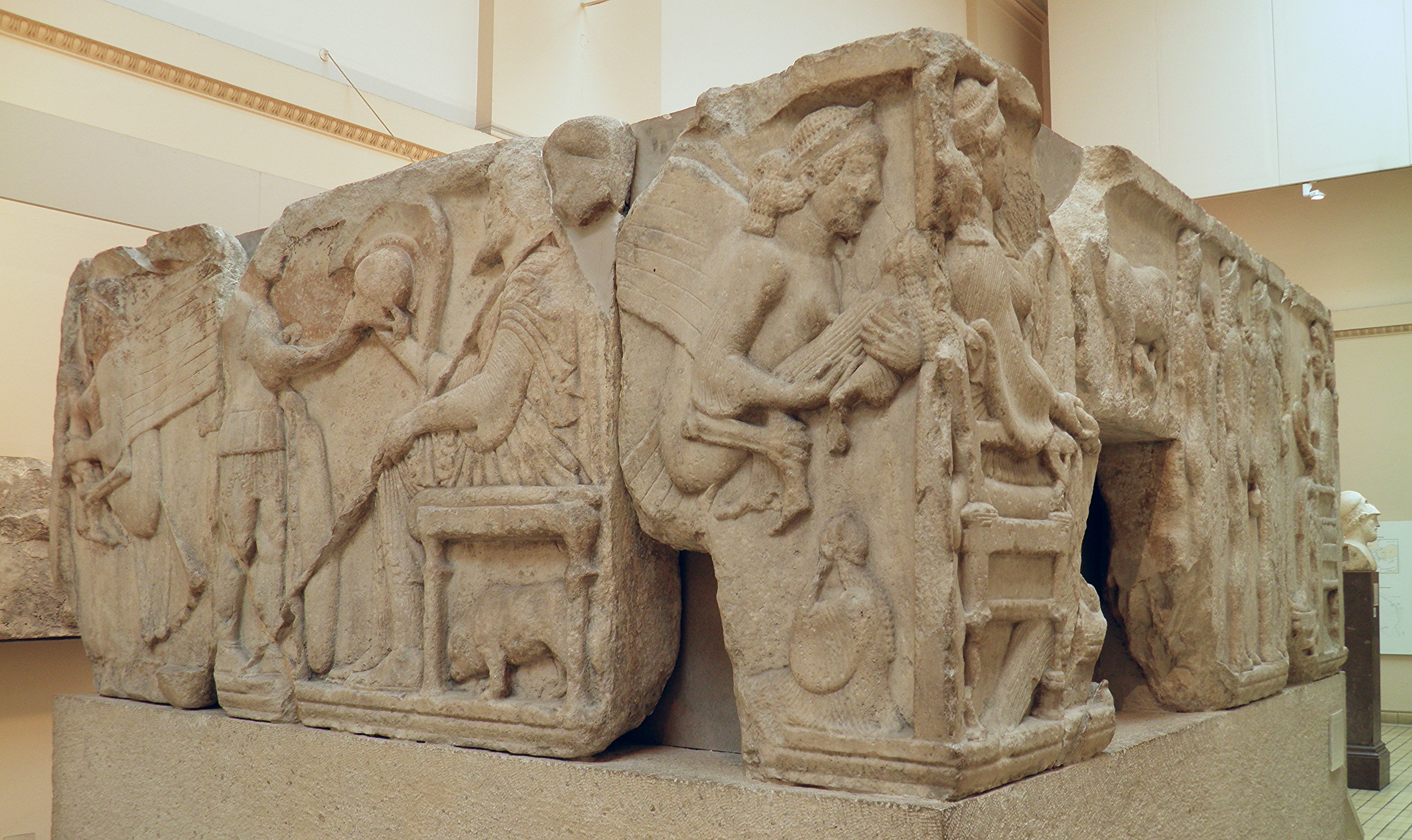
Reconstructed reliefs at the British Museum

The Harpy Tomb, which is located on the Acropolis, was likely made in c. 480–470 BCE. The decorations are made in the Greek Archaic Style.

The interpretation of the iconography of the tomb have developed over time. Initially, it was believed that the winged females on the frieze referenced a myth about violence done to the Lycian royal family. Then, it was postulated that because the tomb was fabricated by Greek artisans and workmen, the imagery referenced a scene of the underworld, using iconography to underscore the funerary use of the structure. Tombs on mainland Greece produced at this time did not include the figures of gods, as are depicted, so a third theory was developed. The third theory is that the multiple generations of figures depicted around the image are an indication of hero worship centred around the individuals buried within the tomb.

=== Inscribed Pillar ===
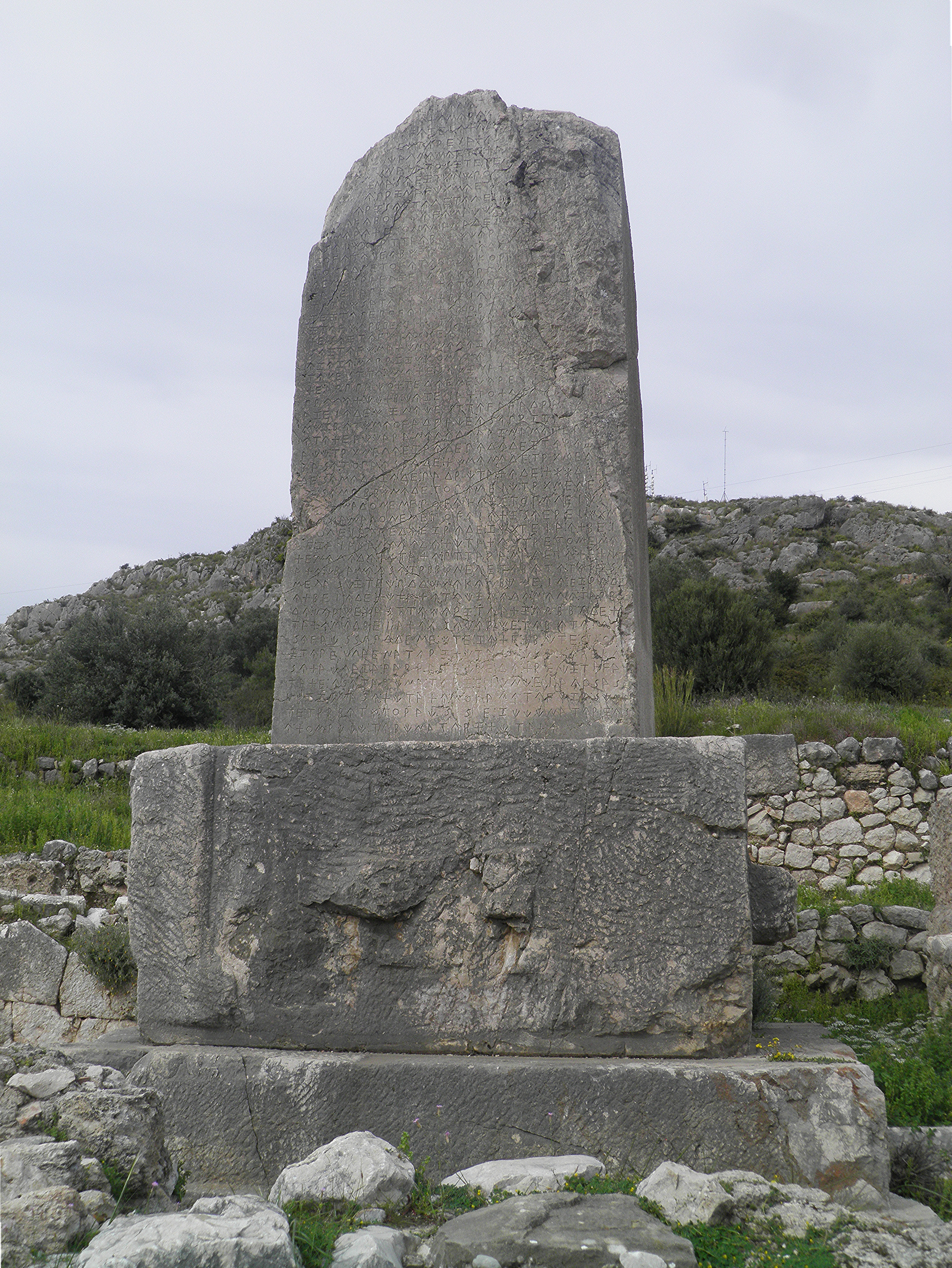
The Xanthian Obelisk

The Inscribed Pillar of Xanthos, also known as the Xanthian Obelisk, was made c. 400 BCE. Like the other pillar tombs at Xanthos, the inscribed pillar supported a raised daise with a chamber tomb, decorated on the outside with friezes. A statue of the occupant, a Xanthian king, was positioned on top. The friezes depicted scenes from the life of the king, including hunting and battle scenes. Seismic activity in antiquity likely caused the chamber tomb to fall off.

Scholars have speculated on the creators of the inscriptions, which are written in Greek and two different types of Lycian. The Greek inscription is a dedication of the monument, likely to 12 Greek gods, and is the oldest Greek inscription known in Lycia. The inscriptions in Lycian B has not yet been fully deciphered, but the inscriptions in Lycian A, the last to be inscribed on the pillar, has been translated. The creator of the Inscribed Pillar is unknown, because several of the letters forming the individual's name in the Lycian inscription are missing.

== Other monuments ==
=== Nereid Monument ===
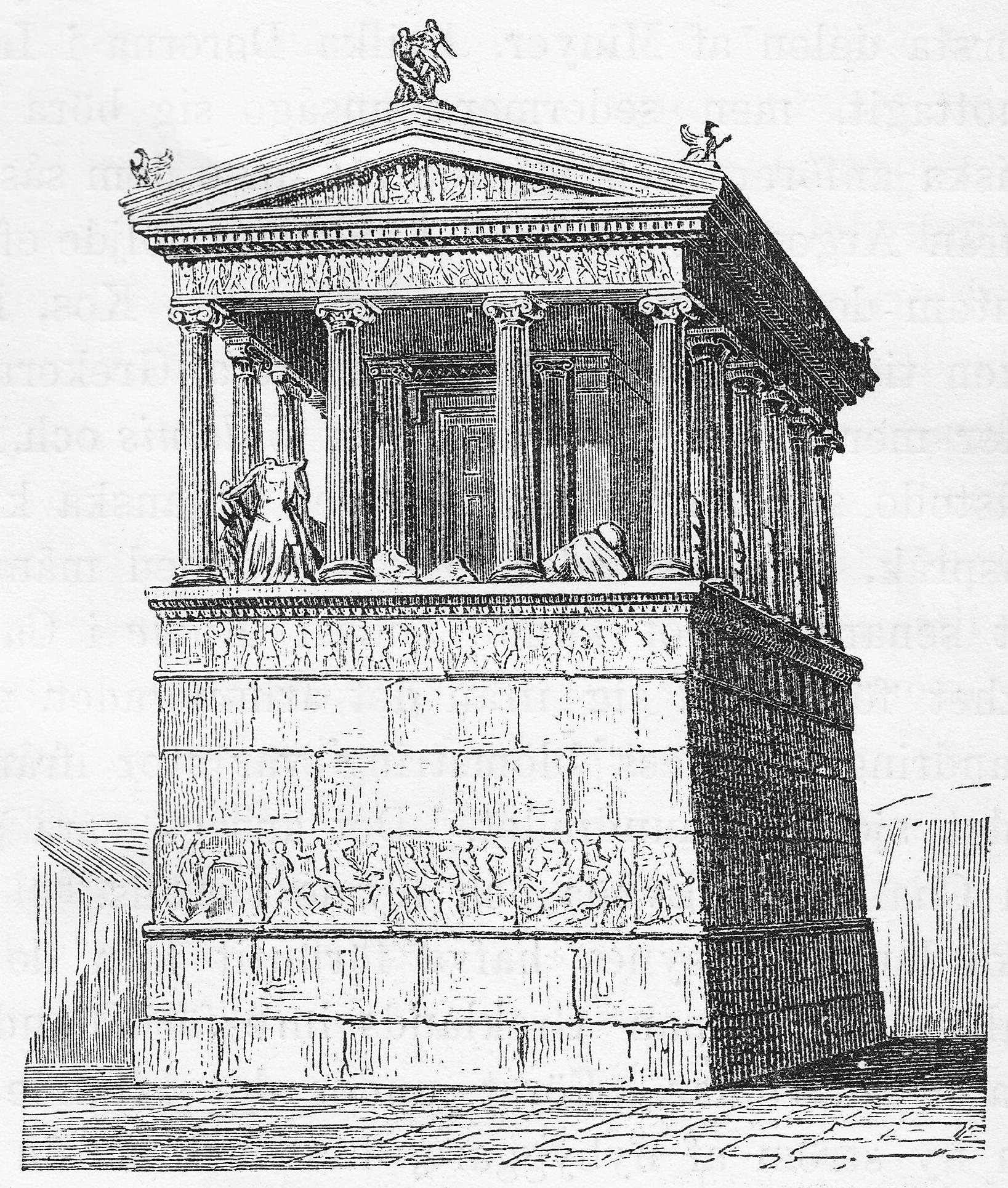
The original Nereid Monument

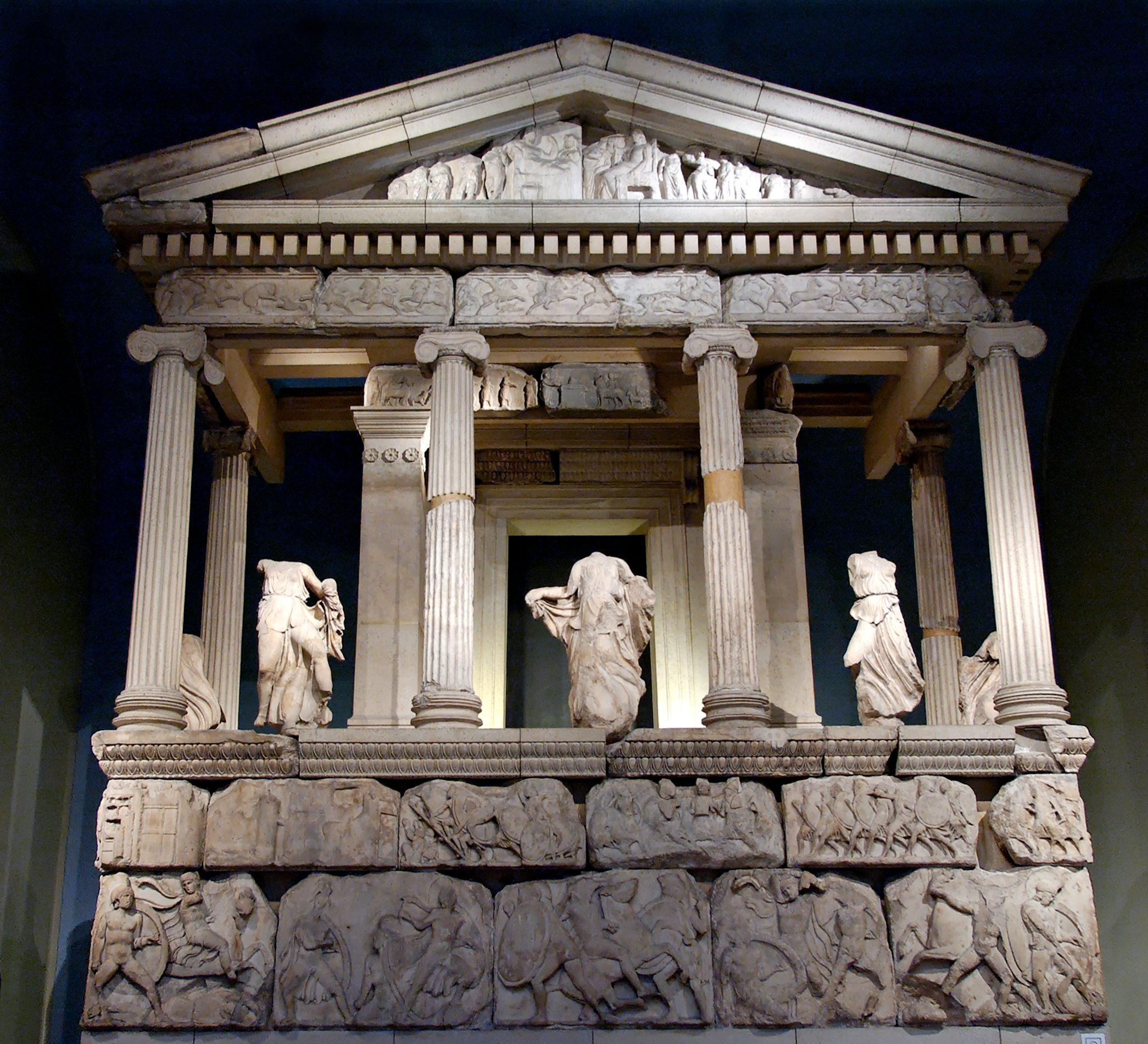
Reconstruction of the Nereid Monument at the British Museum

The Greek Nereid Monument is a tomb named for the three women between the columns on the front. It was built in the Ionic order and its form resembles an Ionic temple. Built c. 380 BCE, the funerary architecture parallels the religious architecture that developed in late Classical Greece. The monument directly influenced regional architecture, including the Mausoleum at Halicarnassus, one of the Seven Wonders of the Ancient World.

The building and the podium it rested on are covered in relief sculpture. The women depicted have been identified either as Nereids, as they might have appeared to the Greeks, or as water nymphs that were part of a local Lycian cult. The “hybrid iconography” present in the monument allows for multiple interpretations. The expression of power is a pervasive theme in the monument, despite it being a tomb. The grand size and position within a dynastic tradition of pillar tombs helps to express the sources of power of the ruler, King Erbinna of the Xanthian Dynasty, who was entombed inside. The monument has numerous references to his power, as the friezes depict both court and battle scenes. On the podium, the iconography is mixed, utilizing Greek iconography on the bottom two friezes and the 8th to 7th century BCE. Assyrian iconography of power on the top two reliefs. Each set of friezes, in the podium, architrave, and interior, each show scenes of political life and recreation, as well as civic and religious duties.

=== Additional tombs ===
Other tombs were present at Xanthos. They include the "Pillar of the Wrestlers", the "Theatre Pillar", the "Acropolis Pillar", and the "Tomb of Payava".

== Stylistic influences ==
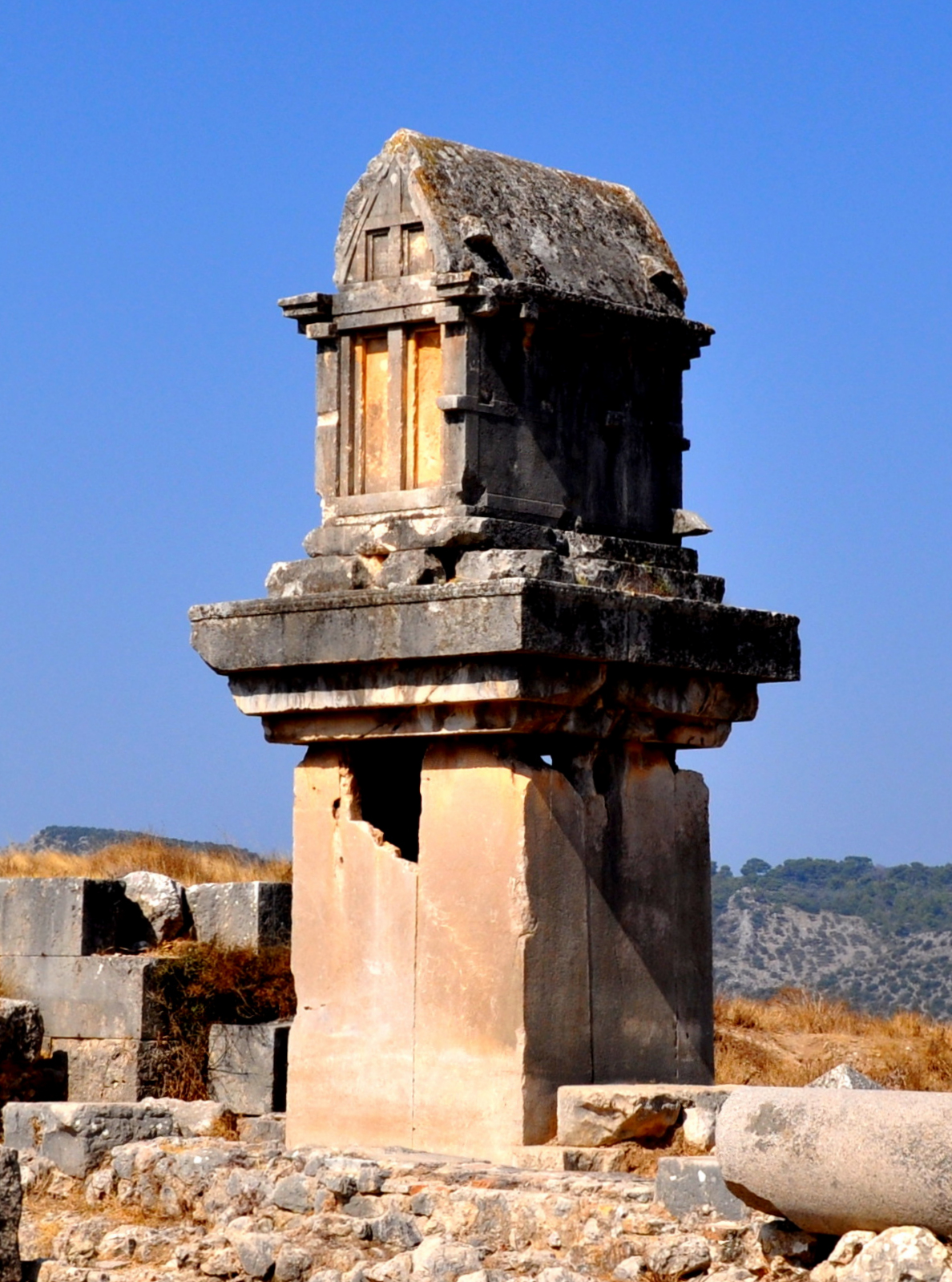
The Xanthos sarcophagus

The tombs at Xanthos derived their form and decoration from many different sources. The form of the pillar tomb was a distinctively Lycian architectural type, but Lycian, Greek, and Persian styles and iconographies are evident in the relief sculpture. The Lycians predominantly used Late Classical Greek themes in their relief sculpture.

The tombs attest to the Greek influence in Anatolia during the Late Classical period, which involved the use of the so-called "East Greek" style. Examples include the reliefs sculpture on the Nereid Monument and depictions of hunters and lions in the Greek Archaic style on the Lion Tomb. The Archaic style manifested itself in grid like, proportional but static depictions of forms.

Phoenicia

The shape of the Lycian ogival tomb was adopted for the "Lycian" sarcophagus of Sidon, a tomb for a king of Phoenicia (modern Lebanon), built by Ionian artists circa 430–420 BCE.

=== Indian architectural parallels ===
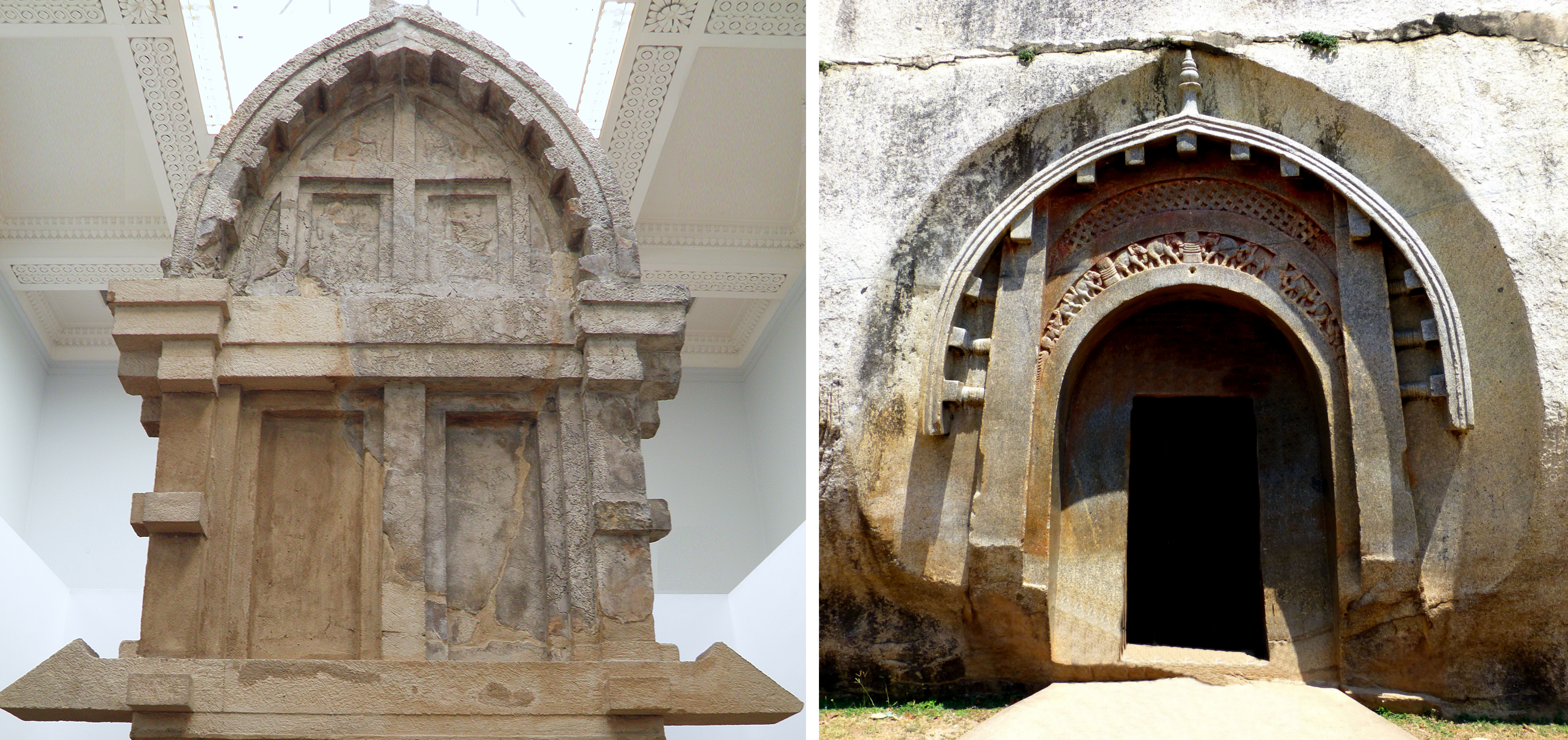
Tomb of Payava (375–360 BCE) and Lomas Rishi cave entrance (c. 250 BCE).

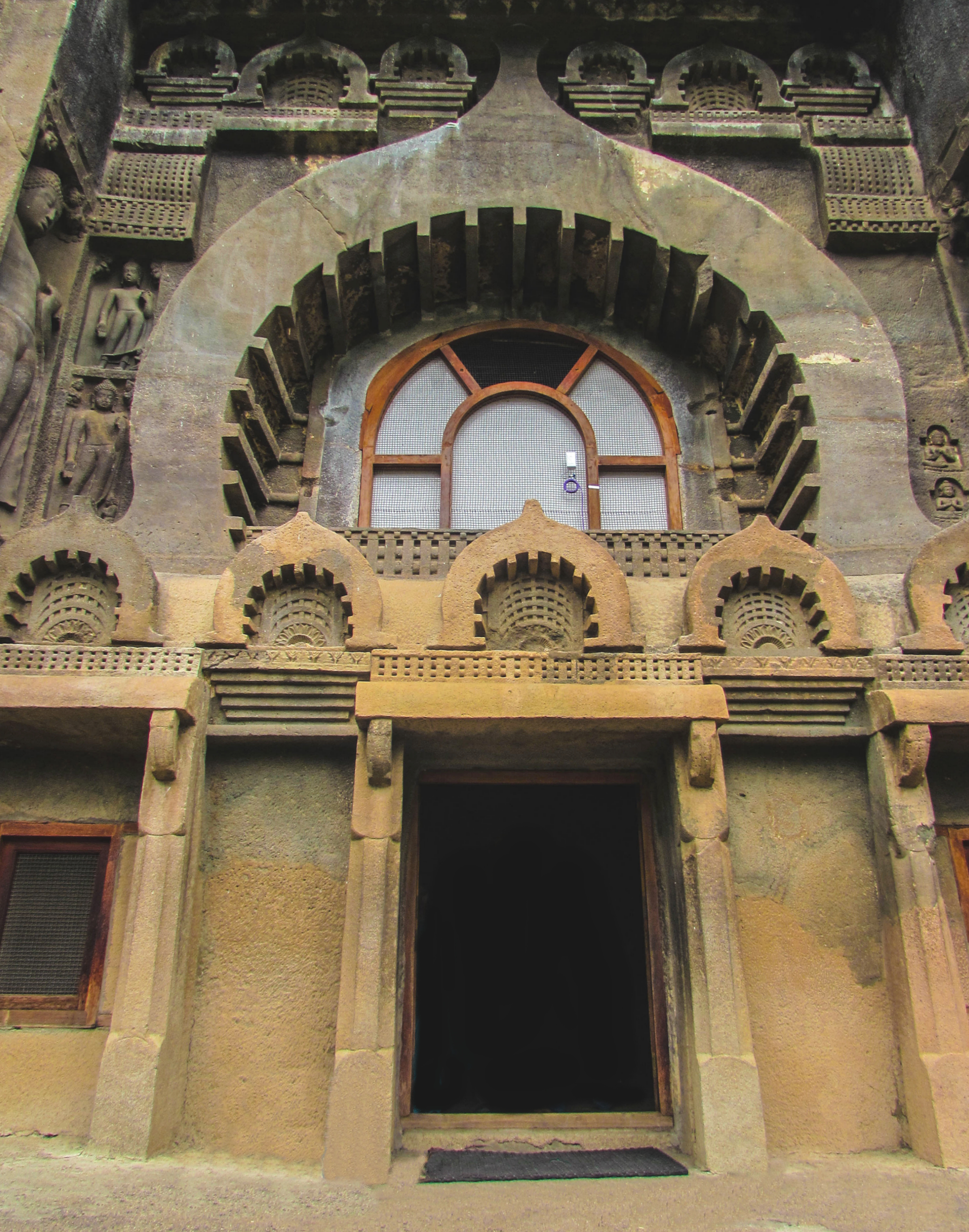
Ajanta Cave 9 (1st century BCE)

The similarity of the tomb of Payava and other Lycian barrel-vaulted tombs with the Indian Chaitya architectural design (starting from c. 250 BCE with the Lomas Rishi caves in the Barabar caves group) has been remarked on. James Fergusson has commented that "in India, the form and construction of the older Buddhist temples resemble so singularly these examples in Lycia".

The Lycian tombs, which were built in the 4th century BCE, are free-standing or rock-cut barrel-vaulted sarcophagi placed on a high base, with architectural features carved in stone to imitate wooden structures. Both Greek and Persian influence can be seen in the reliefs sculpted on the sarcophagi. Similarities with the Chaitya-type Indian Buddhist temple designs, such as the "same pointed form of roof, with a ridge", are further developed in Indian cave temples. Fergusson suggested some form of cultural transfer across the Achaemenid Empire. The known Indian designs for the Chaityas start from c. 250 BCE and postdate the Xanthos tombs by at least a century.

The art historian David Napier has proposed a reverse relationship, claiming that the Payava tomb was a descendant of an ancient South Asian style, and that Payava may actually have been a Graeco-Indian named Pallava.
