= Nancy Thomson de Grummond =

American art historian (born 1940)

- Born: August 26, 1940 (age 86); Lake Charles, Louisiana, U.S.

Academic background
- Education: University of North Carolina at Chapel Hill (PhD)

Academic work
- Discipline: Classical archaeology
- Sub-discipline: Etruscan studies
- Institutions: Florida State University
- Website: classics.fsu.edu/person/nancy-t-de-grummond

Nancy Thomson de Grummond (born August 26, 1940) is an American art historian and archaeologist who is currently the M. Lynette Thompson Professor of Classics and Distinguished Research Professor at Florida State University. She specializes in Etruscan, Hellenistic and Roman archaeology. She serves as the director of archaeological excavations at Cetamura del Chianti in Tuscany, Italy. Her current research relates to Etruscan and Roman religion, myth and iconography.

== Biography ==
De Grummond earned a PhD in art history from the University of North Carolina at Chapel Hill in 1968. She has been a professor at Florida State University since 1968. She was a visiting professor at the University of North Carolina at Chapel Hill from 1989-1990, as well as the Parker Distinguished Visiting Lecturer at Brown University in 1991, and the Edward Togo Salmon visiting professor at McMaster University in 2008.

=== Awards and honors ===
De Grummond has been awarded numerous teaching awards at Florida State University including the Phi Beta Kappa Excellence in Teaching Award (2010). She is a foreign member of the Istituto Nazionale di Studi Etruschi ed Italici. She has held the AIA’s Joukowsky Lectureship, and was the Norton Lecturer in 2011/2012. In 2026, she was awarded the Gold Medal by the Archaeological Institute of America.

== Selected publications ==
1982

- A Guide to Etruscan Mirrors. Archaeological News. 1982. ISBN 9780943254005.

1996

- An Encyclopedia of the History of Classical Archaeology. Vol. I–II. Routledge. 1996. ISBN 9781134268610.

(editor)
2006

- Etruscan Myth, Sacred History, and Legend. Philadelphia, PA: University of Pennsylvania Museum of Archaeology and Anthropology. 2006. ISBN 9781931707862.
- The Religion of the Etruscans. Austin: University of Texas Press. 2006. ISBN 9780292782334.

(co-editor with Erika Simon)
2007

- Etruscan Mirrors - Great Britain 3: Oxford. Corpus Speculorum Etruscorum. Rome: L'Erma di Bretschneider. 2007. ISBN 9788882654436. ISSN 2612-467X – via Academia.edu.

2009

- Grummond, Nancy Thomson De (2009). The Sanctuary of the Etruscan Artisans at Cetamura del Chianti: The Legacy of Alvaro Tracchi. Florence. ISBN 9788879704380. LCCN 2009420317. OCLC 436108199. OL 23947935M.

2016

- De Grummond, Nancy T. (2016-11-01). "Thunder versus Lightning in Etruria". Etruscan Studies. 19 (2): 183–207. doi:10.1515/etst-2016-0011. S2CID 199472126.

2023

- De Grummond, Nancy Thomson (2023). Etruscan Mirrors - USA 6. Corpus Speculorum Etruscorum. Rome: L'Erma di Bretschneider. doi:10.48255/9788891326799. ISBN 9788891326768. ISSN 2612-467X.
