= Paola Bonfante =

Italian plant biology scientist (born 1947)

- Born: 7 May 1947 (age 78); Turin, Italy
- Education: University of Turin
- Scientific career
- Fields: Plant biology; Plant microbe interactions
- Institutions: National Council of Research (1970-1985); University of Turin (1985-2017), Professor Emerita (Present)

Paola Bonfante is a Professor Emerita of plant biology at the University of Turin, she has studied symbiosis between fungi and plants (mycorrhizae), associations that involve 90% of plants with significant impacts on ecosystems, as well as on agriculture.

== Awards and honors ==
- 2019: Appointed Commander (“Commendatore”) of the “Order of Merit of the Italian Republic” by the President of the Italian Republic (“motu proprio”)
- 2010: Award for the Award for the French Food Spirit- Science – Paris, December 16, 2010 2021: The Adam Kondorosi -Academia Europaea Award for Advanced research, September 2021

She is in the list of:

- Clarivate Analytics: highly quoted researcher 2017, 2018, 2020
- One hundred Italian Experts
