= Corpus Speculorum Etruscorum =

International project to publish Etruscan bronze mirrors

Corpus Speculorum Etruscorum is an international project with the goal to publish all existing Etruscan bronze mirrors. The first three volumes were published in 1981. A total of thirty-six fascicles has been produced.

== Background ==
The first major systematic study of Etruscan mirror was Eduard Gerhard's Etruskische Spiegel. The work consists of five volumes published between 1843 and 1897 (the final volume being published after Gerhard's death). In 1973 a decision was made to make a new publication that could replace Gerhard's outdated work.

== Current Volumes ==
=== Belgium ===
1. CSE Belgique 1. Bruxelles, Institut Royal du Patrimoine Artis- tique; Courtrai, Museum voor Oudheidkunde en Sierkunst; Gand, Museum voor Oudheidkunde der Rijksuniversiteit; Hamme, Museum Van Bogaert-Wauters; Louvain-la-Neuve, Musee de l'Institut Superieure d'Archeologie et d'Histoire de l'Art de l'U.C.L.; Morlanwelz, Royal Museum of Mariemont; Collections privees. Roger Lambrechts 1987.

=== Denmark ===
1. CSE Denmark 1. Copenhagen, the Danish National Museum, the Ny Carlsberg Glyptothek. Helle Salskov Roberts. 1981.

=== France ===
1. CSE France 1. Paris, Musée du Louvre 1. Paris, Denise Emmanuel-Rebuffat. 1988.
2. CSE France 1. Paris, Musée du Louvre 2. Paris, Denise Emmanuel-Rebuffat. 1991.
3. CSE France 1. Paris, Musée du Louvre 3. Paris, Denise Emmanuel-Rebuffat. 1997.
4. CSE France 1. Paris, Musée du Louvre 4. Paris, Denise Emmanuel-Rebuffat. 2009.

=== Germany ===
Deutsche Demokratische Republik

1. CSE DDR 1. Berlin, Staatliche Museen, Antikensammlung. Gerald Heres. 1986.
2. CSE DDR 2. Dresden, Staatliche Kunstsammlungen, Skulpturensammlung; Leipzig, Museum des Kusthandwerks; Gotha, Schlossmuseum; Jena, Friedrich-Schiller-Universität. Gerald Heres. 1987.

Bundesrepublik Deutschland

1. CSE BRD 1. Bad Schwalbach, Bochum, Bonn, Darmstadt, Essen, Frankfurt, Kassel, Köln, Mainz, Mannheim, Schloss Fasanerie bei Fulda. Ursula Höckmann. 1987.
2. CSE BRD 2. Braunschweig, Göttingen, Hamburg, Hannover, Kiel, Münster, Steinhort, Wolfenbüttel. Ursula Liepmann. 1988.
3. CSE BRD 3. Stuttgart, Tübingen, Privatsammlungen Esslingen, Stuttgart, Munich. B. v. Freitag Gen. Löringhoff. 1988.
4. CSE BRD 4. Staatliche Museen zu Berlin. Antikensammlung 2. Gerhard Zimmer, 1995.

=== Great Britain ===
1. CSE Great Britain 1. The British Museum 1. Judith Swaddling. 2001.
2. CSE Great Britain 2. Cambridge: Corpus Christi College, The Fitzwilliam Museum, The Museum of Archaeology and Anthropology, The Museum of Classical Archaeology. Richard Nicholls 1993.
3. CSE Great Britain 3. Oxford: Ashmolean Museum, Claydon House, Pitt Rivers Museum. Nancy Thomson de Grummond 2007.

=== Hungary and Czechoslovakia ===
1. CSE Hongrie, Tchécoslovaquie. J.G. Szilágyi and Jan Bouzek. 1992.

=== Italy ===
1. CSE Italia 1.Bologna, Museo Civico 1. Giuseppe Sassatelli. 1981.
2. CSE Italia 1. Bologna, Museo Civico 2. Giuseppe Sassatelli. 1981.
3. CSE Italia 2. Perugia, Museo Archeologico Nazionale 1. Alba Frascarelli. 1995.
4. CSE Italia 3. Volterra, Museo Guarnacci 1. Gabriele Cateni. 1995.
5. CSE Italia 4. Orvieto, Museo "Claudio Faina." Maria Stella Pacetti. 1998.
6. CSE Italia 5. Viterbo, Museo Archeologico Nazionale. Gabriella Barbieri, with collaboration of Lorenzo Galeotti. 1999.
7. CSE Italia 6. Rome, Museo Nazionale Etrusco di Villa Giulia 1. Maria Paola Baglione and Fernando Gilotta, with collaboration of Lorenzo Galeotti.
8. CSE Italia 6. Rome, Museo Nazionale Etrusco di Villa Giulia 2. Elena Foddai. 2009.
9. CSE Italia 6. Rome, Museo Nazionale Etrusco di Villa Giulia-Antiquarium 3. La Collezione del Museo Kircheriano. Maria Stella Pacetti. 2011.
10. CSE Italia 7. Rome, Museo Nazionale Romano 1. Museo delle Antichità etrusche e italiche, Sapienza- Università di Roma. Laura Ambrosini. 2012.
11. CSE Italia 8. Musei dell'Etruria Padana: Marzabotto, Monterenzio, Spina, Adria, Modena, Reggio Emilia, Parma. Giuseppe Sassatelli and Andrea Gaucci. 2018.

=== The Netherlands ===
1. CSE The Netherlands. Amsterdam, Allard Pierson Museum. The Hague, Gemeentemuseum. The Hague, Museum Meermanno-Westreenianum. Leiden, Rijksmuseum van Oudheden. Nijmegen, Rijksmuseum Kam. Utrecht, Archaeological Institute - State University, Private collection "Meer". L. Bouke van der Meer. 1983.

=== Poland ===
1. CSE Polonia 1. Witold Dobrowolski. Forthcoming.

=== Norway and Sweden ===
1. CSE Norway-Sweden 1. Oslo, Göteborg, Lund, Mora, Stockholm, Private Collections. Ingela M.B. Wiman. 2018.

=== Switzerland ===
1. CSE Schweiz 1. Basel, Schaffhausen, Bern, Lausanne. Ines Jucker. 2001.

=== U.S.A. ===
1. CSE U.S.A. 1. Midwestern collections. Richard Daniel De Puma. 1987.
2. CSE U.S.A. 2. Boston and Cambridge, Boston: Museum of Fine Arts, Cambridge: Harvard University museums. Richard Daniel De Puma. 1993.
3. CSE U.S.A. 3. New York, the Metropolitan Museum of Art. Larissa Bonfante. 1997.
4. CSE U.S.A. 4. Northeastern collections. Richard Daniel De Puma. 2005.
5. CSE U.S.A. 5. West Coast collections. Evelyn E. Bell, Helen Nagy. 2021.

=== Vatican City ===
1. CSE Stato della Città del Vaticano 1. Città del Vaticano, Museo Profano della Biblioteca Apostolica Vaticana; Rome, Collezione di antichità dell'Abbazia di San Paolo fuori le mura. Roger Lambrechts. 1995.

== See also ==
- Corpus Inscriptionum Etruscarum
