= Jean MacIntosh Turfa =

Etruscologist and archaeologist

Jean Turfa
- Born: 1947 (age 78–79); Philadelphia, Pennsylvania, United States

Academic background
- Education: Gwynedd Mercy College (BA); Bryn Mawr College (PhD)

Academic work
- Discipline: Archeology
- Sub-discipline: Etruscan studies
- Institutions: University of Liverpool, University of Illinois at Chicago, University of Chicago, Loyola University Chicago, Drexel University, Dickinson College, Bryn Mawr College, St. Joseph's University, University of Pennsylvania

Jean MacIntosh Turfa (born 1947) is an American archaeologist and authority on the Etruscan civilization.

Jean MacIntosh graduated from Abington High School in Philadelphia and then earned her bachelor's degree at Gwynedd Mercy College. She went on to complete a PhD in Classical and Near Eastern Archaeology at Bryn Mawr College in 1974.

Turfa has taught at the University of Liverpool, the University of Illinois at Chicago, the University of Chicago, Loyola University Chicago, Drexel University, Dickinson College, Bryn Mawr College, St. Joseph's University, and the University of Pennsylvania.

She has participated in archaeological excavation campaigns in the United States, the United Kingdom, in Italy at Poggio Civitate (Murlo), and at Corinth in Greece. She has been engaged in research and museum-based projects at the Manchester Museum, the Liverpool Museum, the British Museum and the University of Pennsylvania Museum of Archaeology and Anthropology.

She is a member of the US section of the Istituto Nazionale di Studi Etruschi ed Italici.

== Publications ==
- MacIntosh, Jean (1976). Etruscan-Punic relations (Thesis). OCLC 641947047.
- Turfa, Jean MacIntosh (July 1, 1977). "Evidence for Etruscan-Punic Relations". American Journal of Archaeology. 81 (3): 368–374. doi:10.2307/503012. JSTOR 503012.
- Turfa, Jean Macintosh; Pallottino, Massimo (1982). "The Etruscan and Italic Collection in the Manchester Museum". Papers of the British School at Rome. 50: 166–195. doi:10.1017/S0068246200009491. JSTOR 40310787. S2CID 192962562.
- Turfa, Jean MacIntosh; Steinmayer, Alwin G. (1996). "The Comparative Structure of Greek and Etruscan Monumental Buildings". Papers of the British School at Rome. 64: 1–39. doi:10.1017/S0068246200010333. JSTOR 40310930. S2CID 192582436.
- Turfa, Jean MacIntosh; Steinmayer, Alwin G. (2002). "Interpreting Early Etruscan Structures: The Question of Murlo". Papers of the British School at Rome. 70: 1–28. doi:10.1017/S0068246200002099. JSTOR 40311042. S2CID 128682200.
- Turfa, Jean MacIntosh (2005). Catalogue of the Etruscan Gallery of the University of Pennsylvania Museum of Archaeology and Anthropology. University of Pennsylvania Press. doi:10.2307/j.ctt3fhbfv. ISBN 978-1-931707-52-7. JSTOR j.ctt3fhbfv.
- Turfa, Jean MacIntosh (2012). Divining the Etruscan World: The Brontoscopic Calendar and Religious Practice. Cambridge University Press. ISBN 978-1-107-00907-3.
- Becker, Marshall J.; Turfa, Jean MacIntosh (2017). The Etruscans and the History of Dentistry: The Golden Smile through the Ages. Routledge. ISBN 978-1-317-19464-4.
- Becker, Marshall Joseph; Turfa, Jean MacIntosh; Algee-Hewitt, Bridget (2009). Human Remains from Etruscan and Italic Tomb Groups in the University of Pennsylvania Museum. Fabrizio Serra Editore. ISBN 978-88-6227-114-1.
- Turfa, Jean MacIntosh, ed. (2013). The Etruscan World. Routledge. ISBN 978-0-415-67308-2.
- Budin, Stephanie Lynn; Turfa, Jean Macintosh, eds. (August 12, 2016). Women in Antiquity: Real Women across the Ancient World. Routledge. ISBN 978-1-317-21990-3.
- Gleba, Margarita; Becker, Hilary, eds. (2009). Votives, Places, and Rituals in Etruscan Religion: Studies in Honor Of Jean MacIntosh Turfa. BRILL. doi:10.1163/ej.9789004170452.i-292. ISBN 978-90-04-17045-2.
