= Kybernis =

Ruler of Lycia from 520 BC to 480 BC

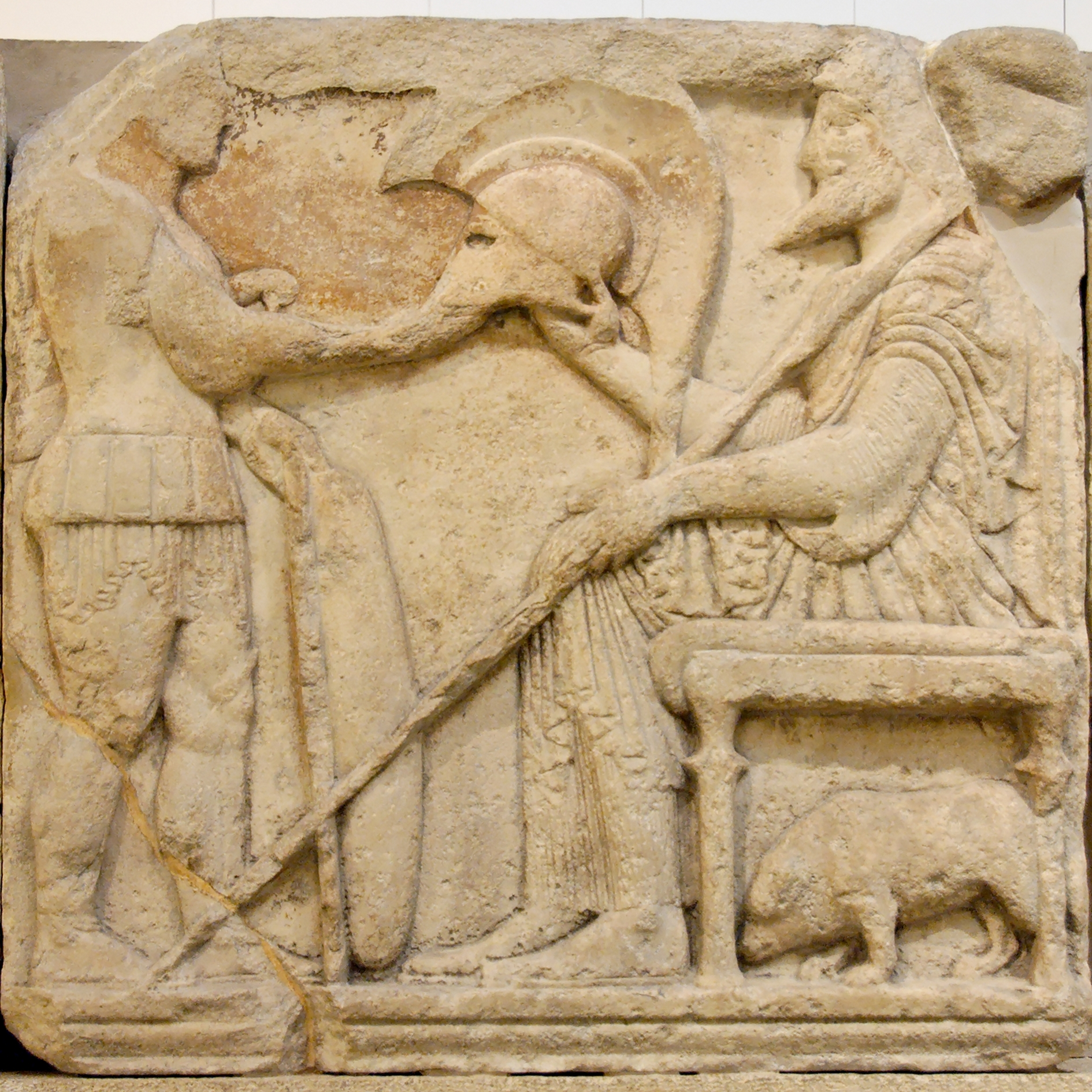
Depiction of the Lycian ruler Kybernis (520–480 BCE) on his tomb (the "Harpy Tomb", British Museum).

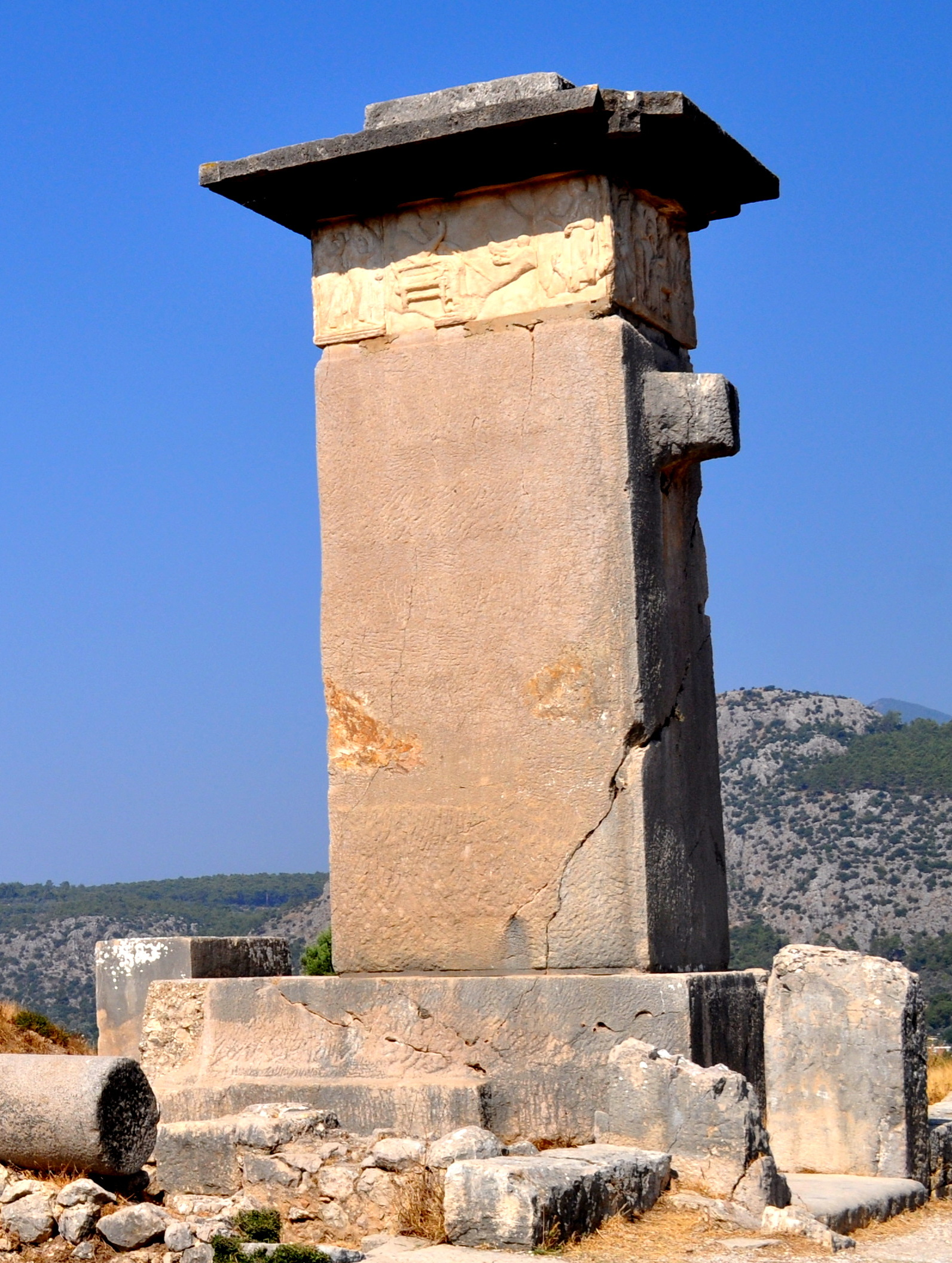
The "Harpy Tomb", a solid sandstone pillar with the sarcophagus of Kybernis on top (local reconstitution, the original sculpted plates being in the British Museum).

Kybernis or Kubernis (ruled 520-480 BCE; KUB on his coins in Lycian, called Cyberniscus son of Sicas by Herodotus) was a dynast of Lycia, at the beginning of the time it was under the domination of the Achaemenid Empire. He is best known through his tomb, the Harpy Tomb, the decorative remains of which are now in the British Museum. According to Melanie Michailidis, though bearing a "Greek appearance", the Harpy Tomb, the Nereid Monument and the Tomb of Payava were built according main Zoroastrian criteria "by being composed of thick stone, raised on plinths off the ground, and having single windowless chambers".

Kybernis is known from Herodotus (Hdt. 7.92, 98) to have served under Xerxes I during the Persian invasion of Greece circa 480 BCE. He came with 50 ships. His men were equipped with cuirasses, felt caps with feathers, and capes made of goat-skin.

The Lycians furnished fifty ships; they wore cuirasses and greaves, carrying bows of cornel-wood and unfeathered arrows and javelins; goat-skins hung from their shoulders, and they wore on their heads caps set about with feathers; daggers they had too, and scimitars. The Lycians were of Cretan descent, and were once called Termilae; they took the name they bear from Lycus, an Athenian, son of Pandion.

[...]

Of those that were on shipboard [was]...Cyberniscus of Lycia, son of Sicas...

— Herodotus (7.92, 98).

It is assumed that Kybernis disappeared at the Battle of Salamis (480 BCE), together with a large part of the Achaemenid fleet.

== Sources ==
- Michailidis, Melanie (2009). "Empty Graves: The Tomb Towers of Northern Iran". In Gacek, Tomasz; Pstrusińska, Jadwiga (eds.). Proceedings of the Ninth Conference of the European Society for Central Asian Studies. Cambridge Scholars Publishing. ISBN 978-1443815024.
