= Tomb of Payava =

Lycian sarcophagus in the British Museum

The tomb of Payava
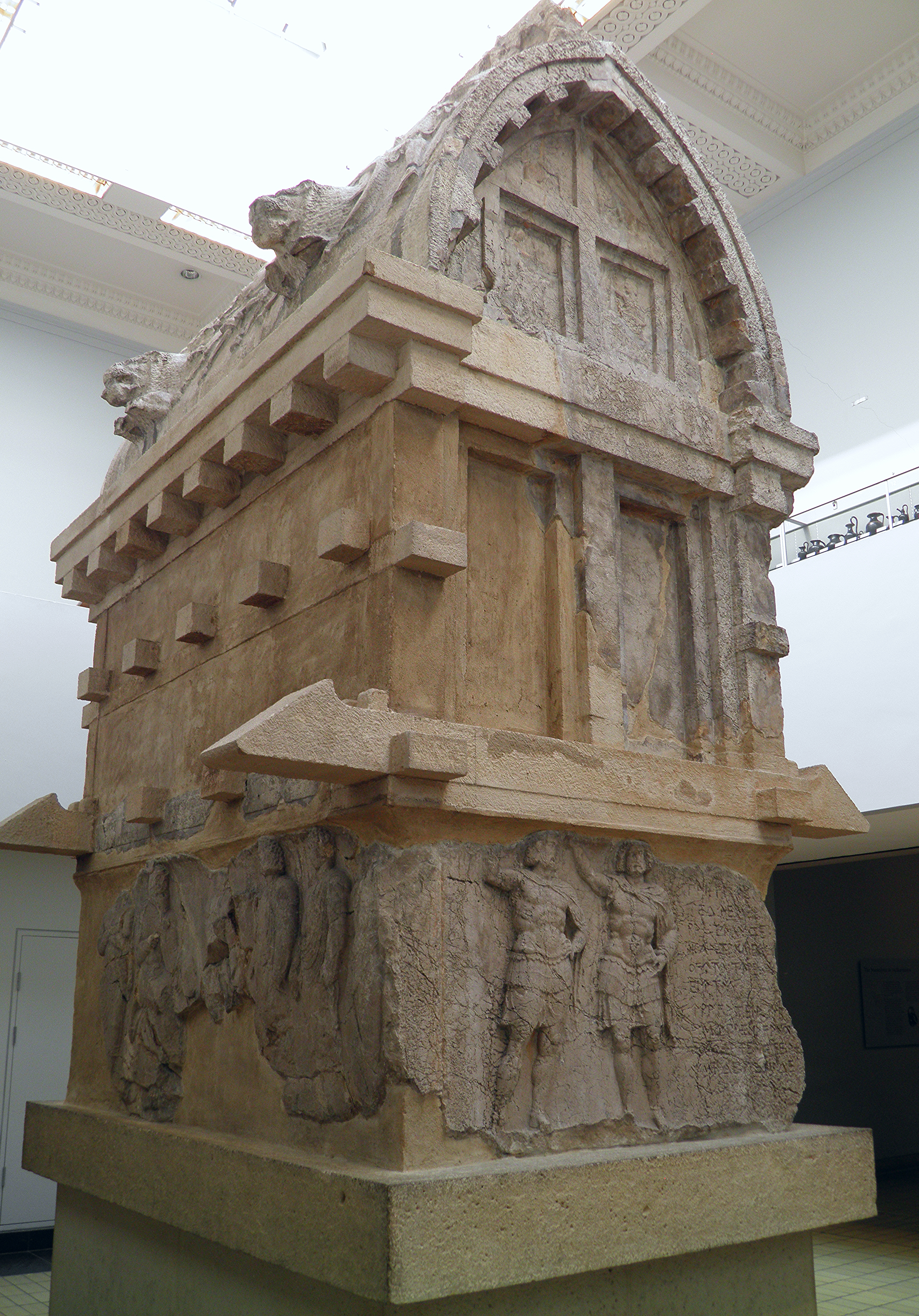
- Upper part of Payava's tomb in the British Museum
- Interactive map of The tomb of Payava
- Location: Originally Xanthos, Lycia, Persian Empire (modern-day Kınık, Kaş, Turkey; now British Museum, Room 20
- Type: Barrel-vaulted sarcophagus
- Material: Stone
- Height: 3.5 metres (11 ft), originally 7.85 metres (25.8 ft)
- Completion date: 375-360 BC

The Tomb of Payava is a Lycian tall rectangular free-standing barrel-vaulted stone sarcophagus, and one of the most famous tombs of Xanthos. It was built in the Achaemenid Persian Empire, for Payava, who was probably the ruler of Xanthos, Lycia (modern-day Kınık, Kaş, Turkey) at the time, in around 360 BC. The tomb was discovered in 1838 and brought to England in 1844 by the explorer Sir Charles Fellows. He described it as a 'Gothic-formed Horse Tomb'. According to Melanie Michailidis, though bearing a Greek appearance, the Tomb of Payava, the Harpy Tomb and the Nereid Monument were built according to the main Zoroastrian criteria "by being composed of thick stone, raised on plinths off the ground, and having single windowless chambers".

== The tomb ==
Payava, who is named in the inscriptions, is only known from this tomb. The tomb is a particularly fine example of a common Lycian style, carved from stone but accurately depicting a wooden structure.

Three of the four tiers of the tomb are currently housed in the British Museum where they dominate the centre of room 20, the lowest tier was left in Turkey and is in a poor state. Displayed with the tomb are other Greek and Lycian objects from 400 to 325 BC.

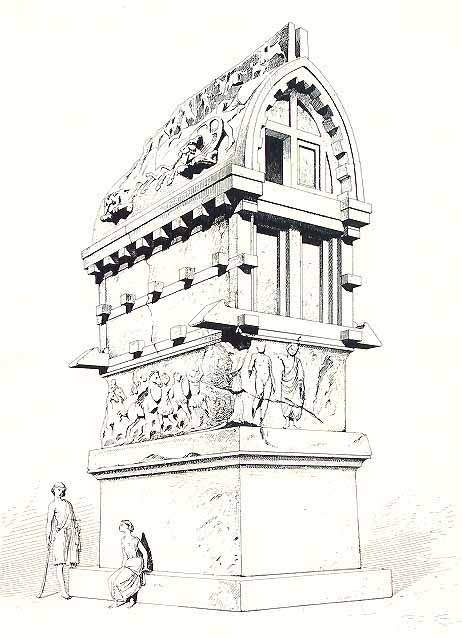
Reconstruction drawing of the Payava tomb by Viollet-le-Duc.

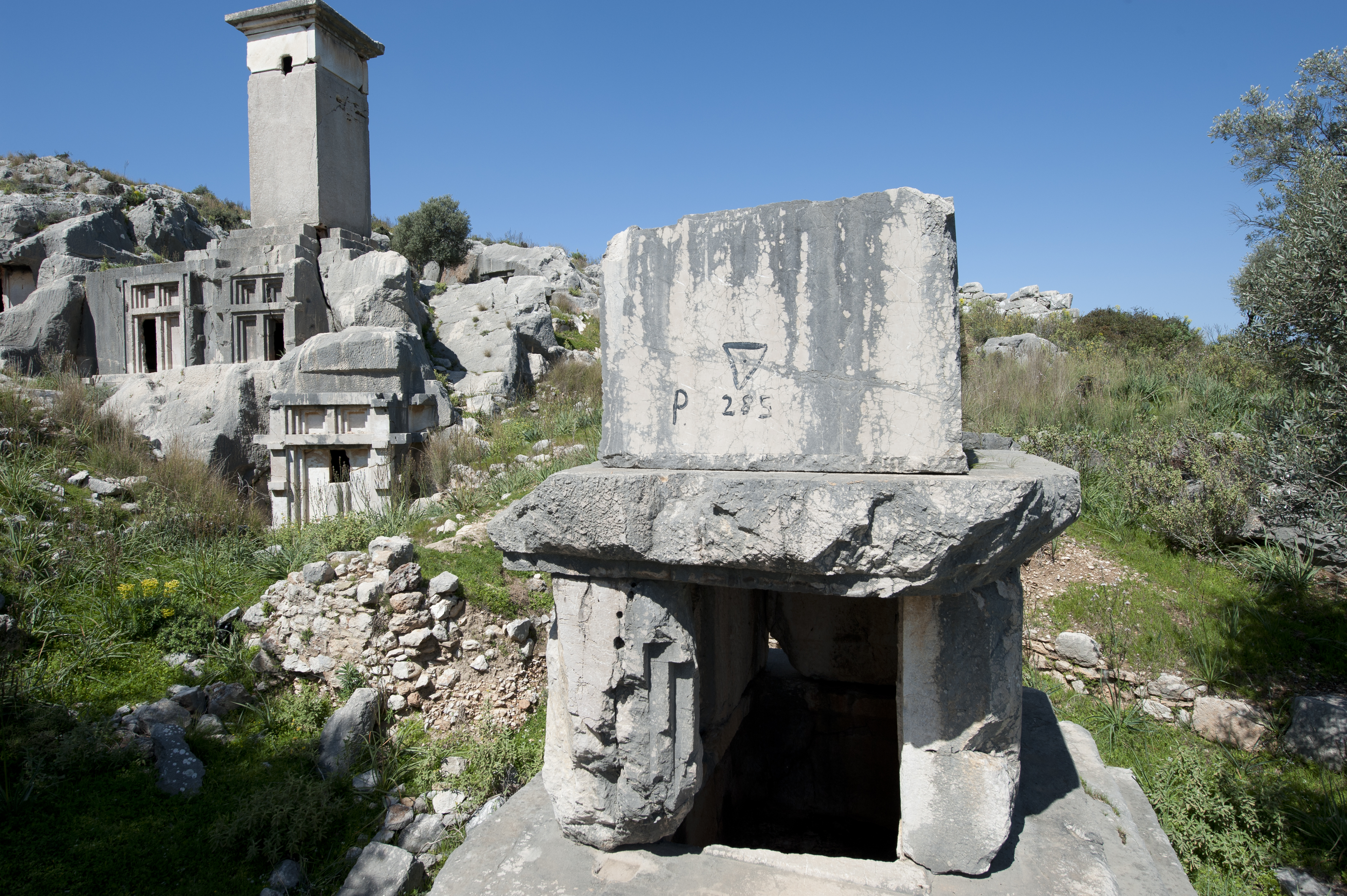
Original base of the Payava sarcophagus (front view).

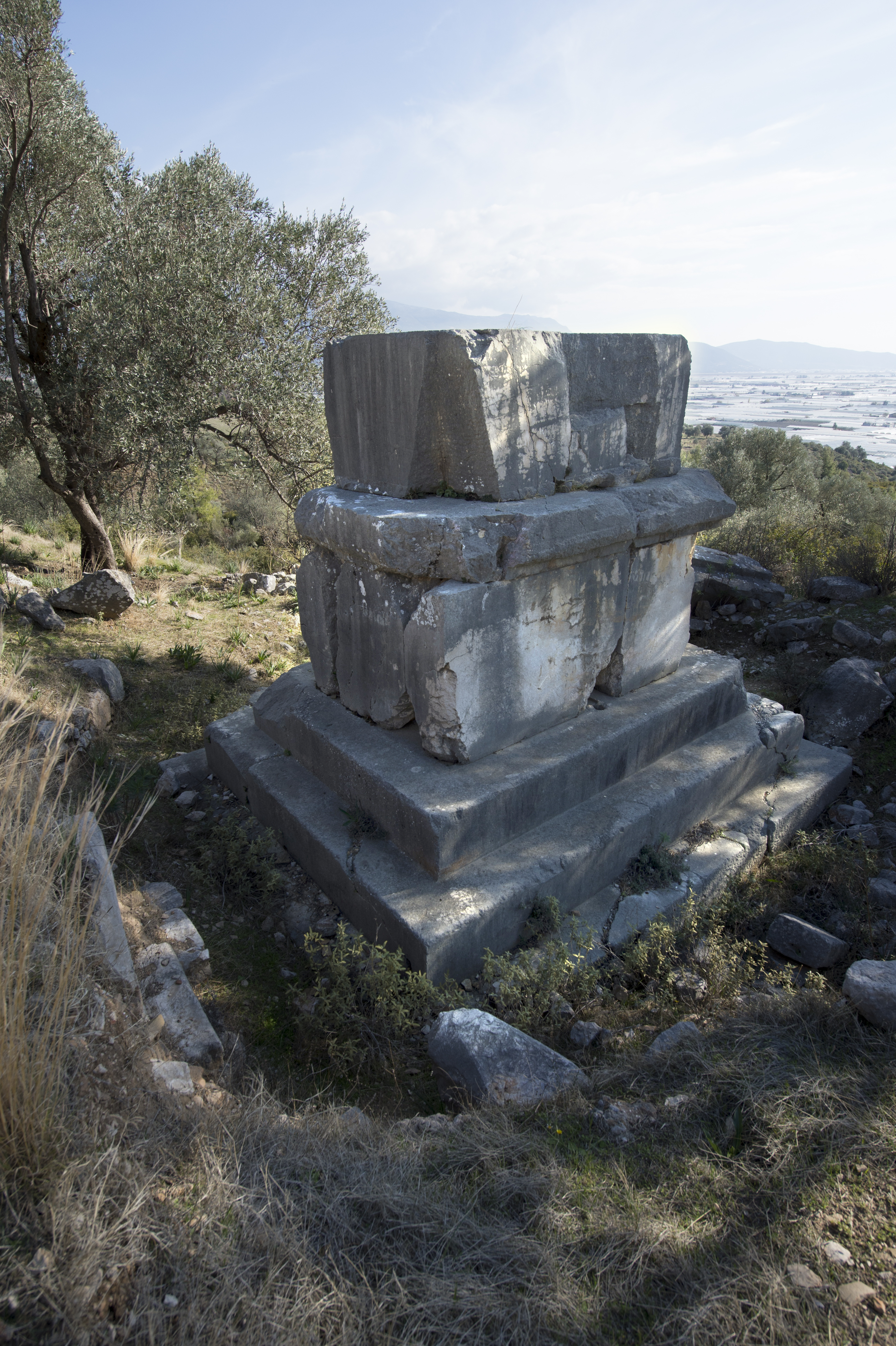
Original base of the Payava sarcophagus (back view).

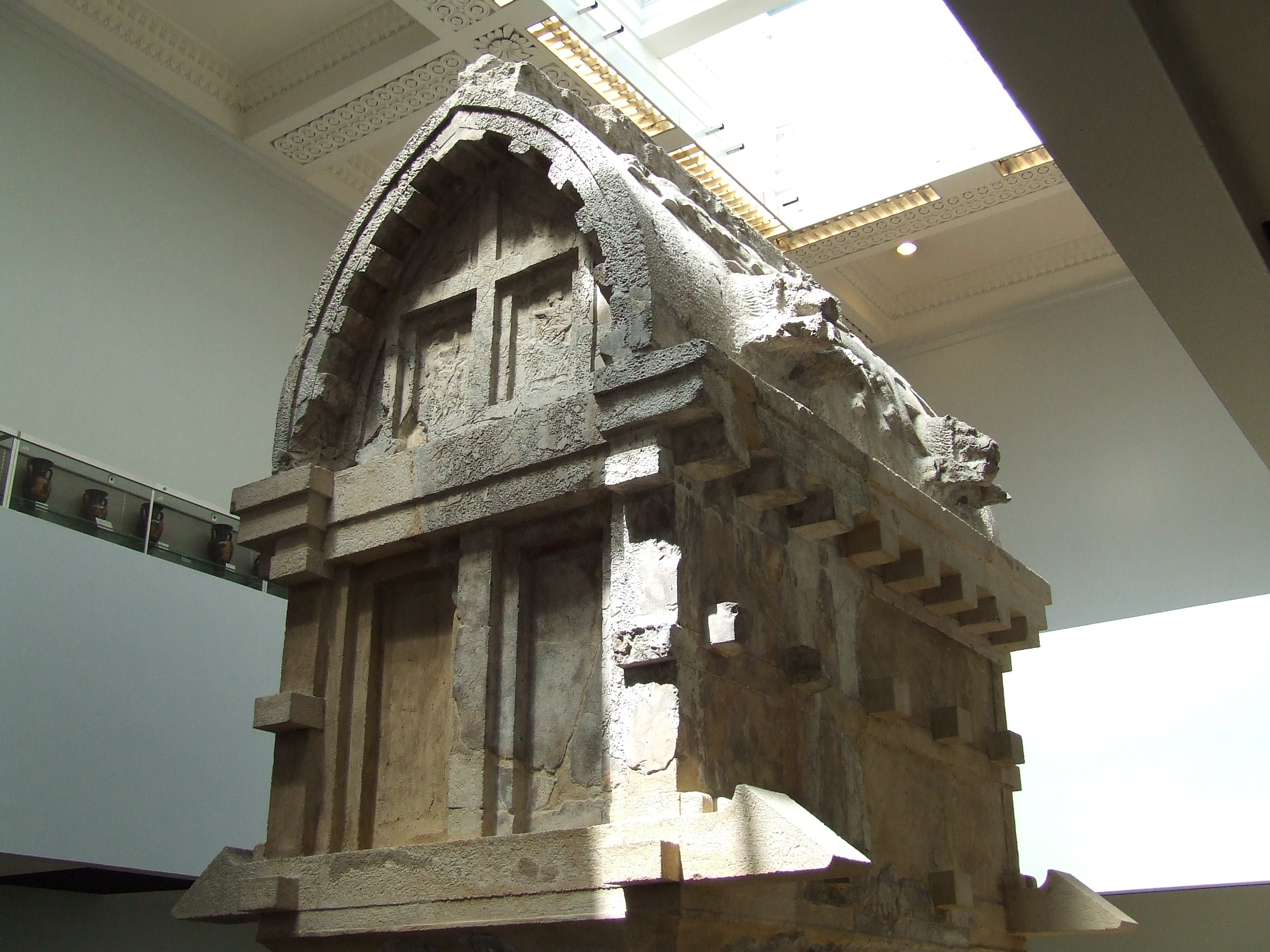
Side view of the tomb.

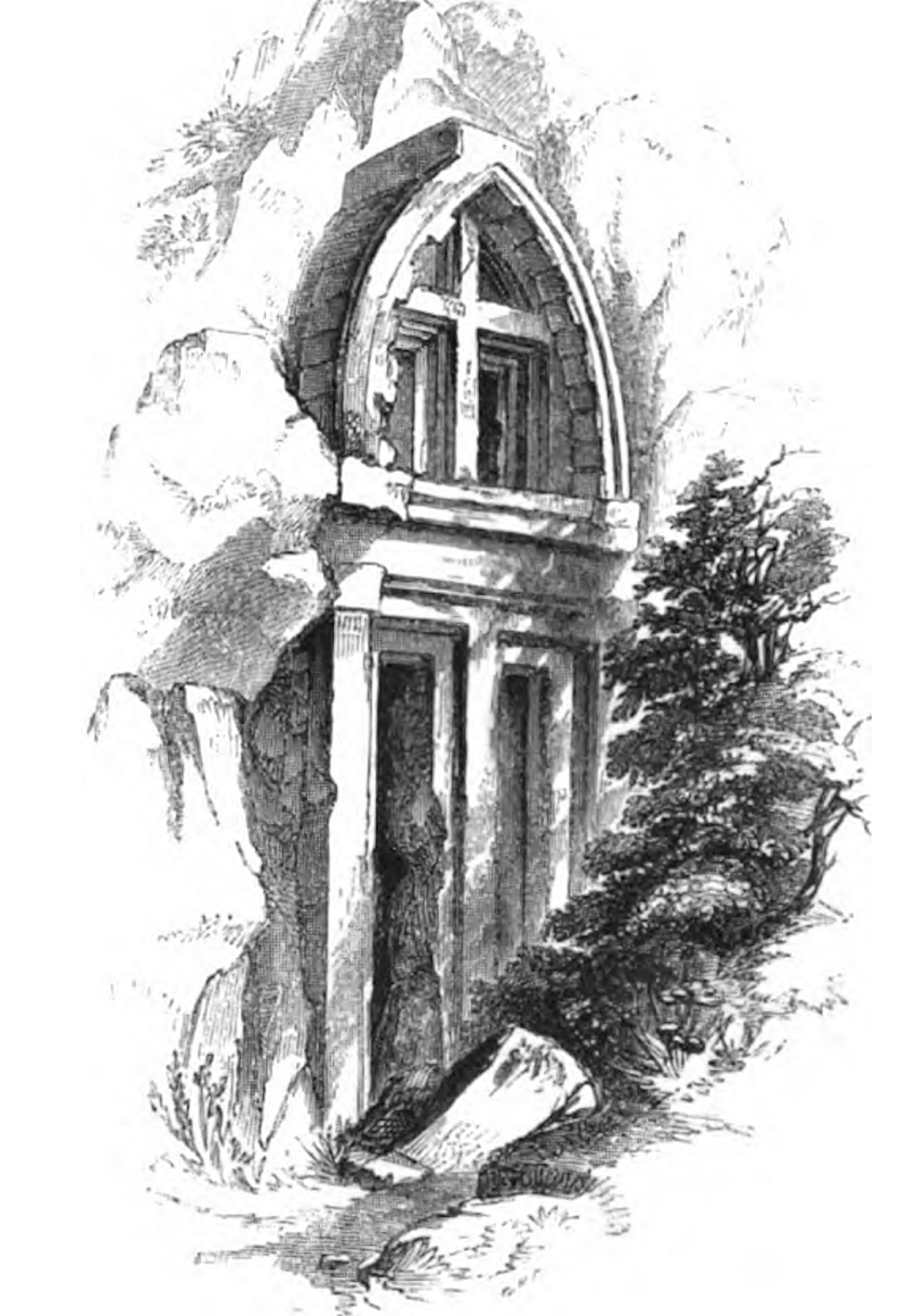
A rock-cut equivalent from Lycia.

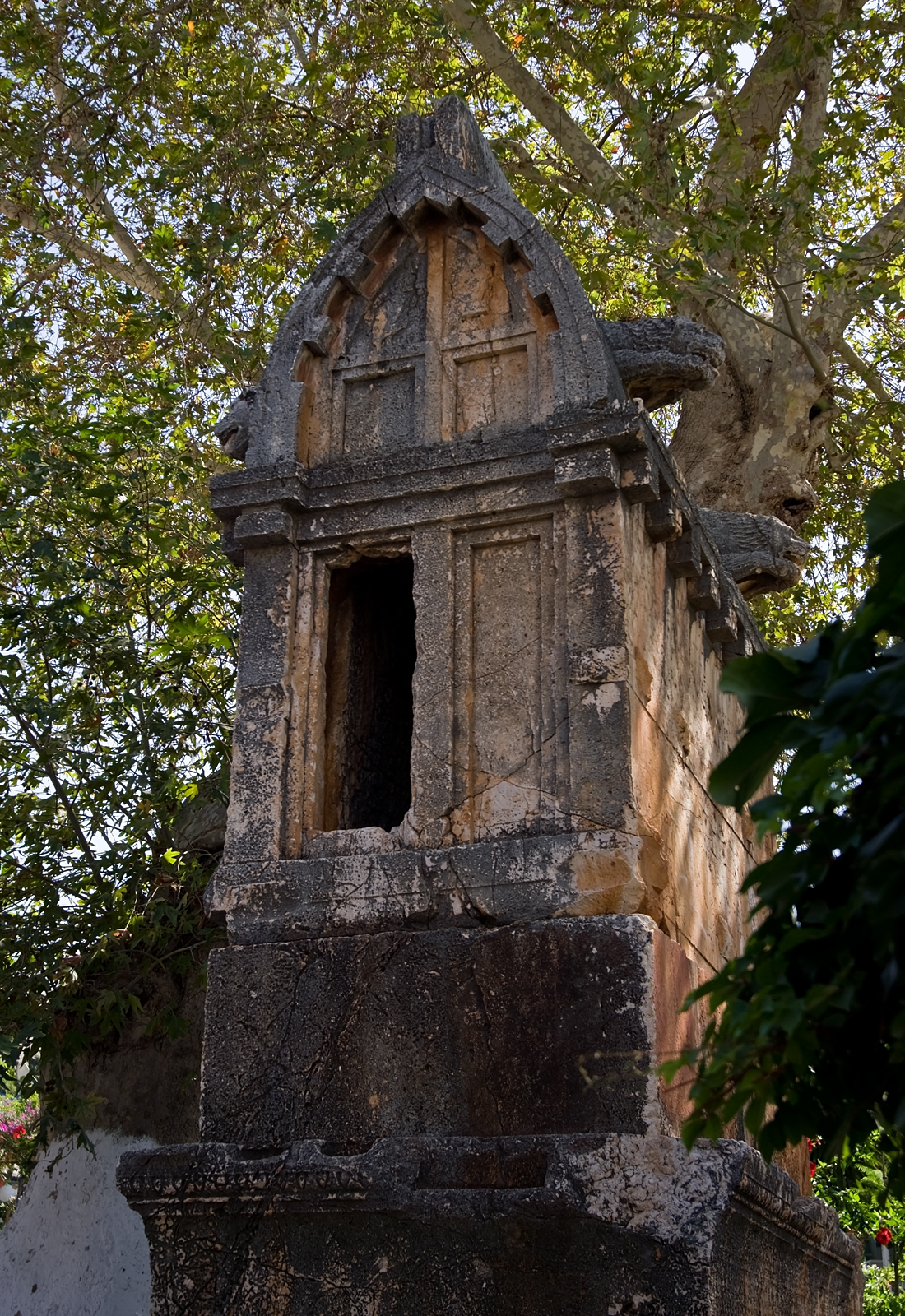
Similar Lycian tomb in Kaş.

== Reliefs ==
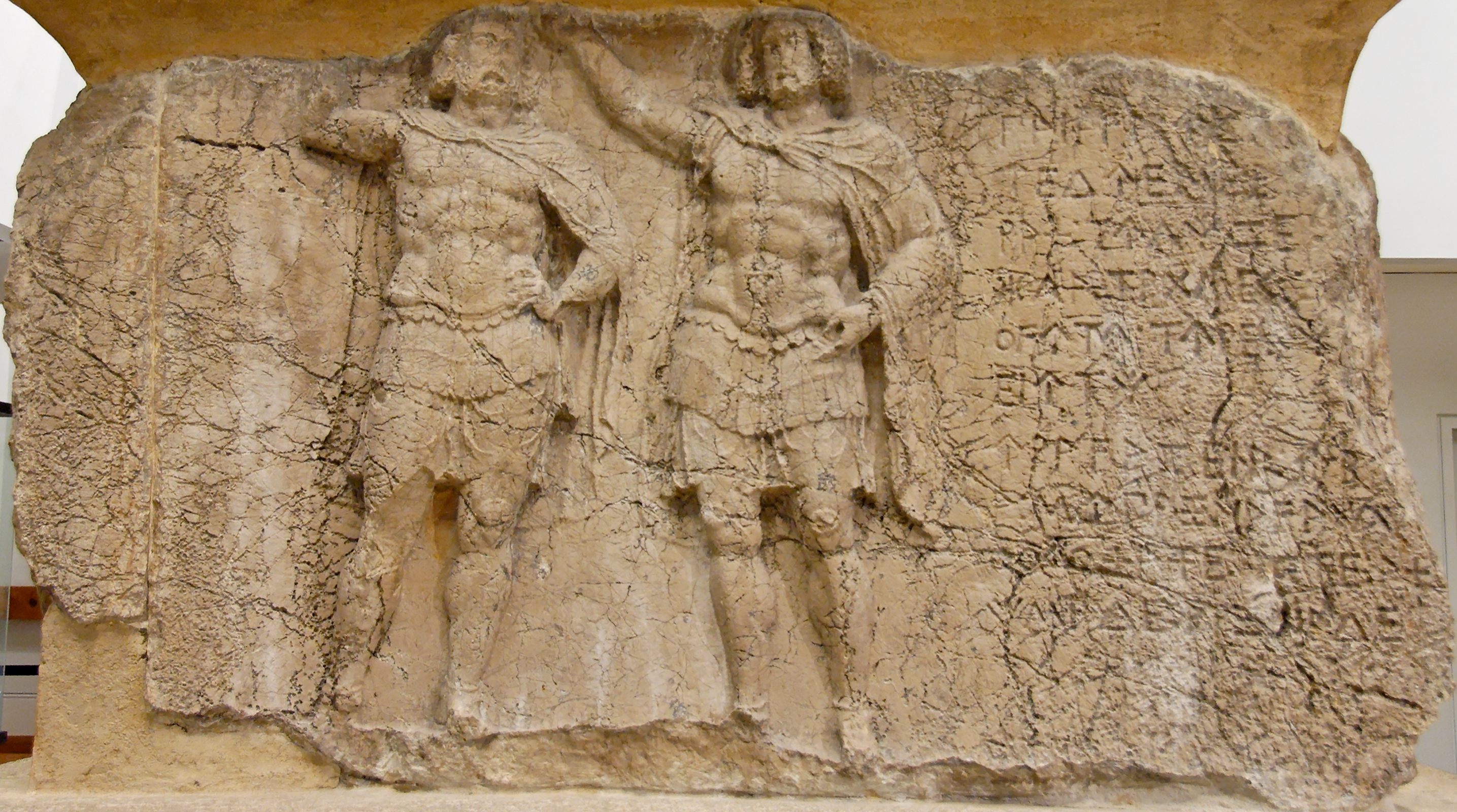
Carving from the south side of the second tier of the tomb showing two men in military dress, wearing a cuirass with pendant leather straps, a cloak and greaves. 375-360 BC.

The reliefs contain illustrations of various events of the life of Payava. The carved friezes on the tomb and its roof contain Greek and Persian features, showing the mix of influences in Xanthos at that time and show:

- Two long-haired and bearded men clothed in cuirasses and cloaks, one of whom may be Payava (South side). — The Lycian inscription runs: “Payava, son of Ed[...], acquired [this grave] in the sacred [burial] area of the acropolis(?) of A[rttumba]ra (a Lycian ruler), when Lycia saw(?) S[alas](??) [as governor(?)]. This tomb I [= Payava] made, a 10 year iti (project?), by means of Xanthian ahamas.”.
- An athlete and companion dressed in a Greek style (North side).
- A seated figure, in a Median coat receiving a delegation. Possibly the satrap Autophradates receiving Payava (West side). — The Lycian inscription says: "This xruwata [bowl?] gave to him Autophradates (Wataprdata), the Persian satrap, on(?) the acropolis (?) he received the Lycian (and) ma[naxi(?)]"
- Battle of cavalry and foot soldiers (East side and Upper frieze). — The Lycian inscription says: "Payava the manaxi built this building."
- A bear being hunted (Upper frieze).
- Lions (Roof).
- Sphinxes (Pediments).
- Four horses pulling a Greek chariot (Roof). Same inscription as on the east side: "Payava the manaxi built this building."
- A Persian couple (Gable ends).
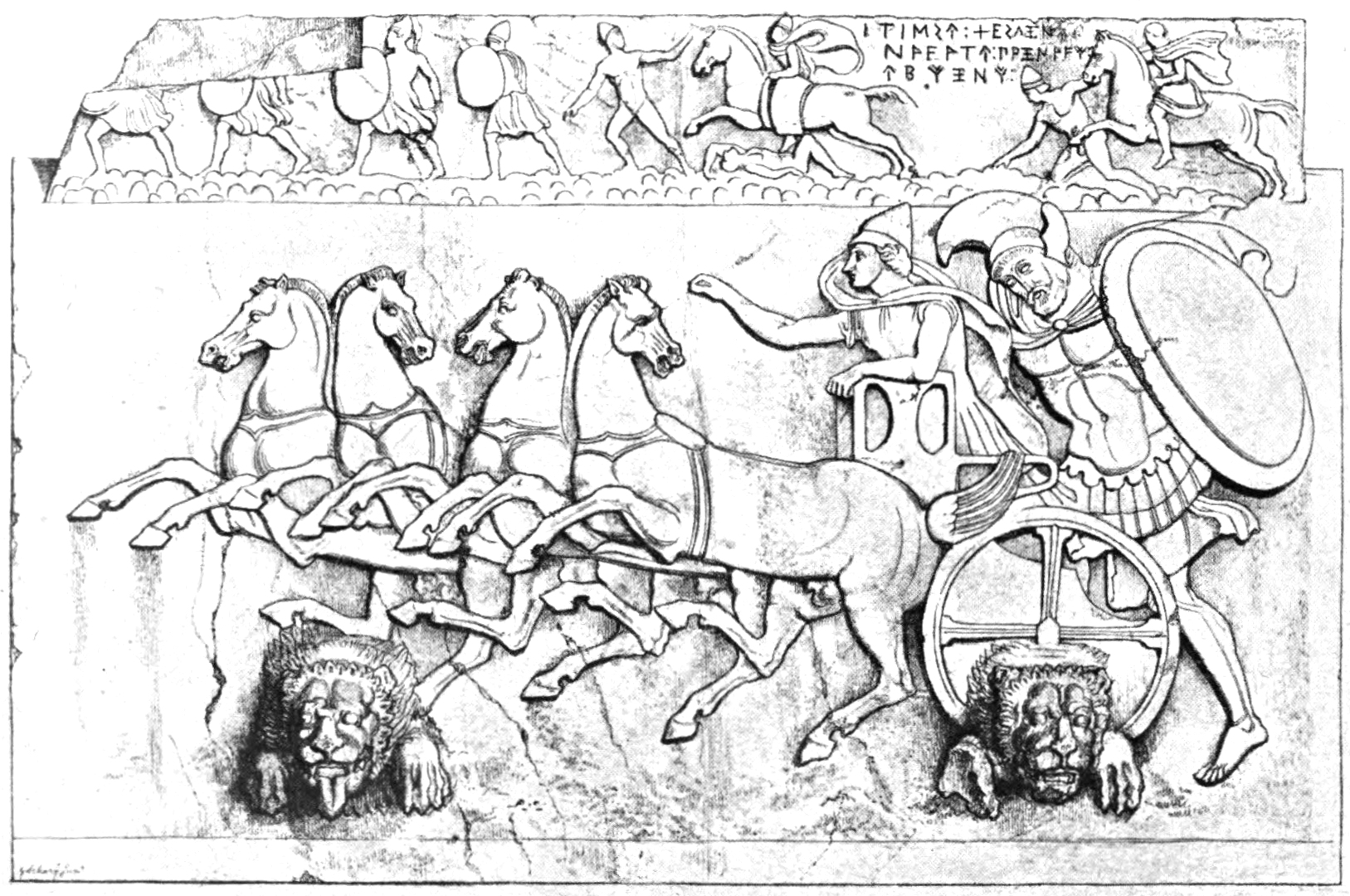
Tomb of Payava, roof relief

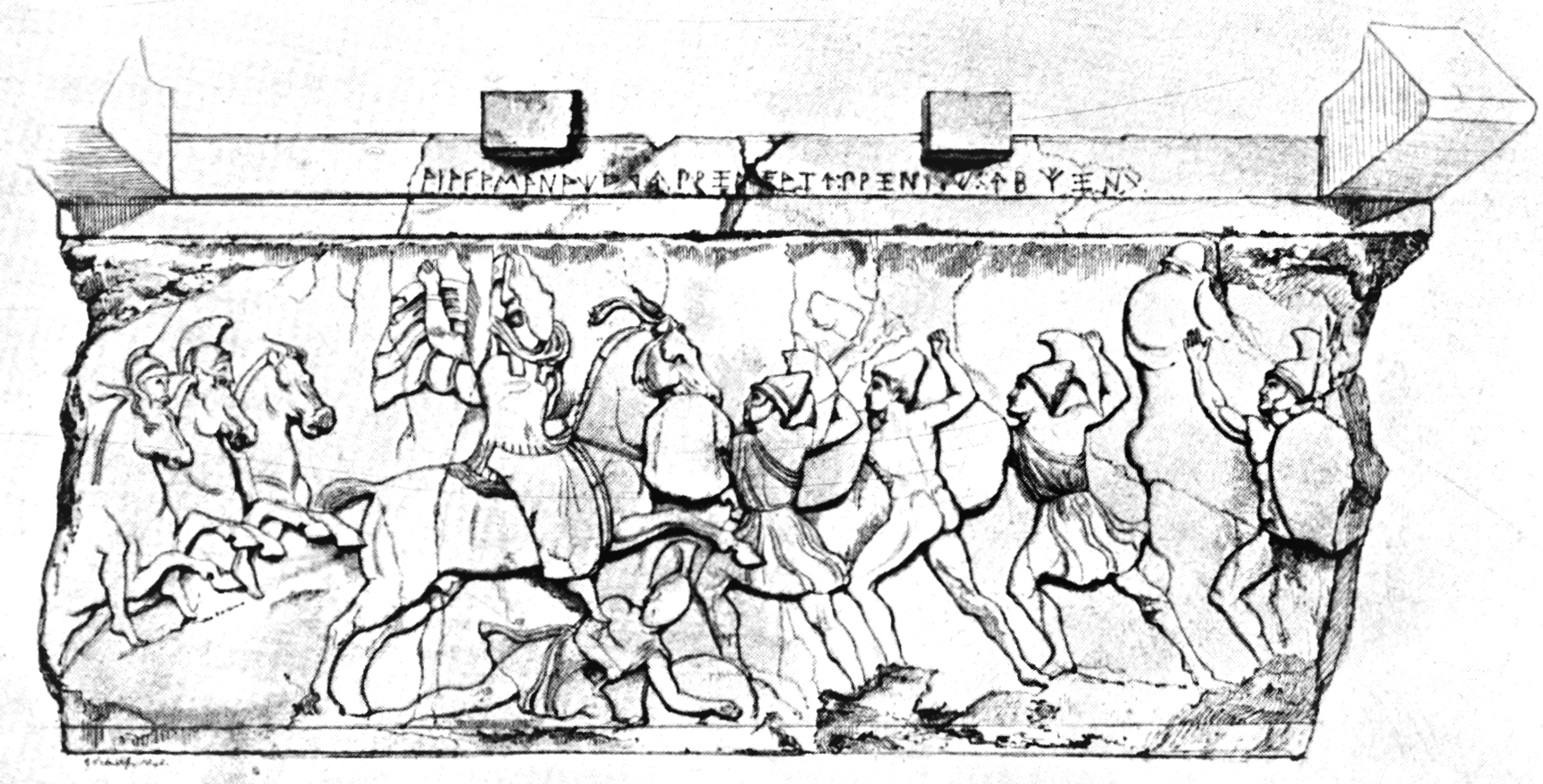
Tomb of Payava, east side

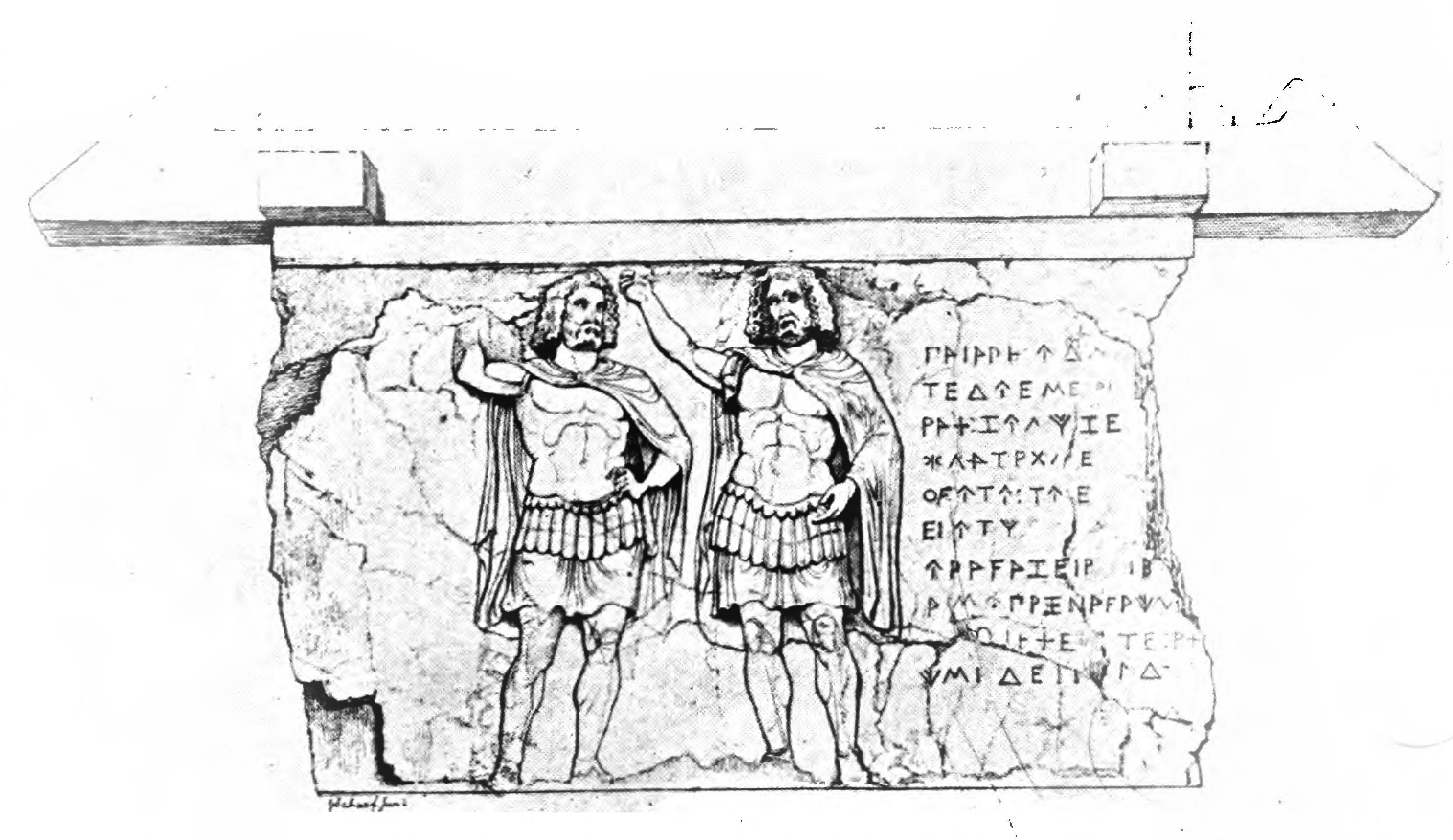
Tomb of Payava, south side

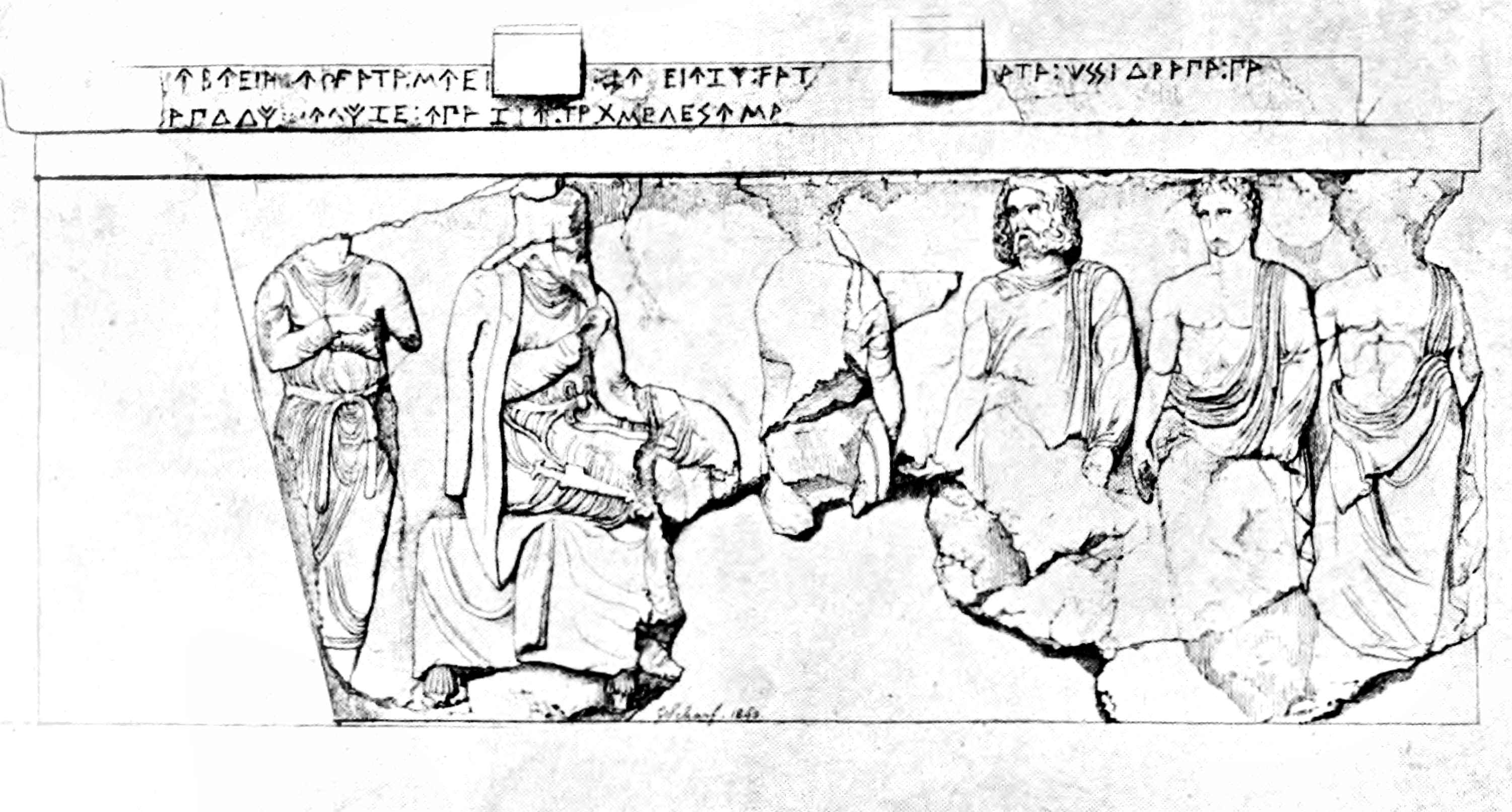
Tomb of Payava, west side

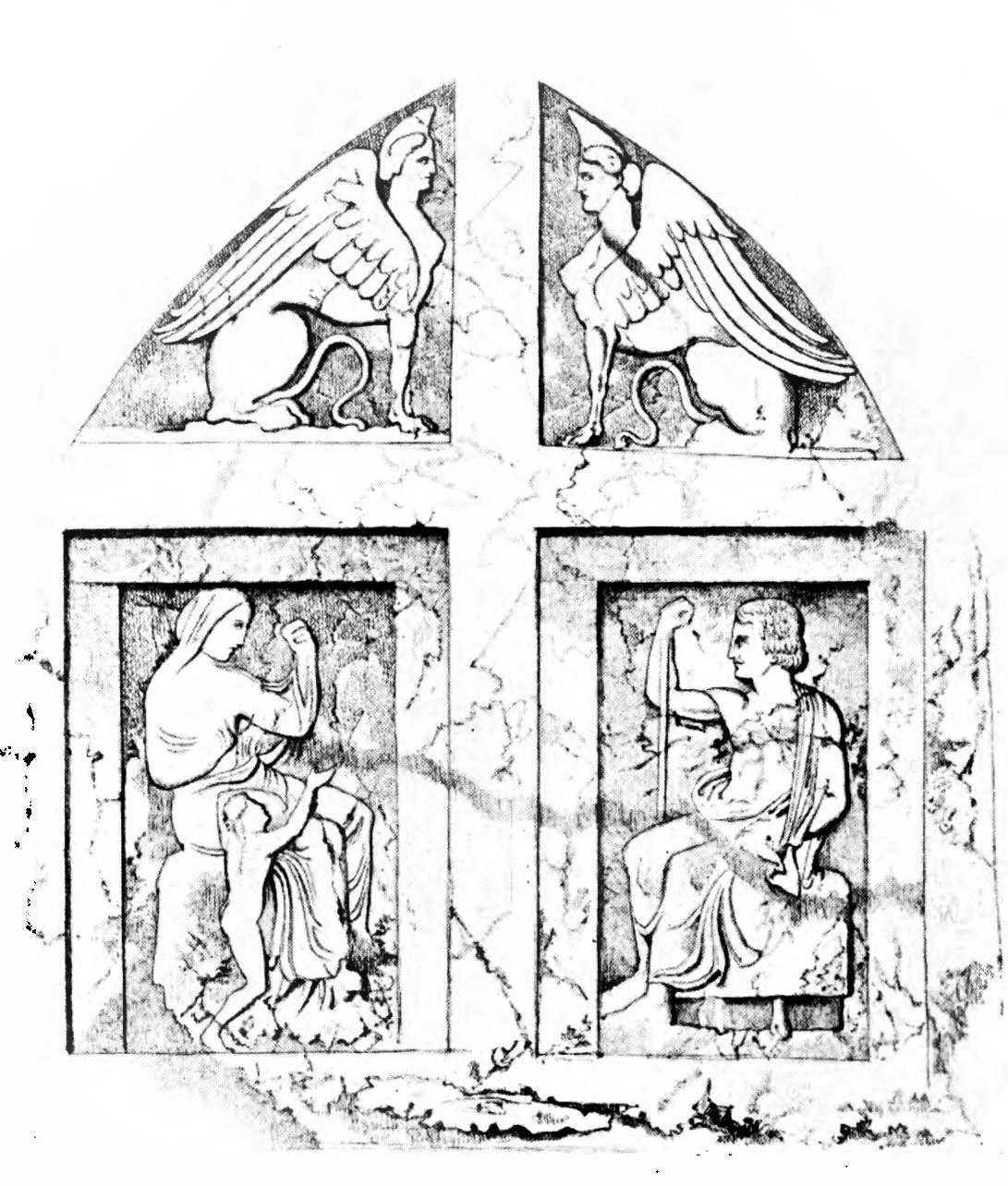
Tomb of Payava, south end

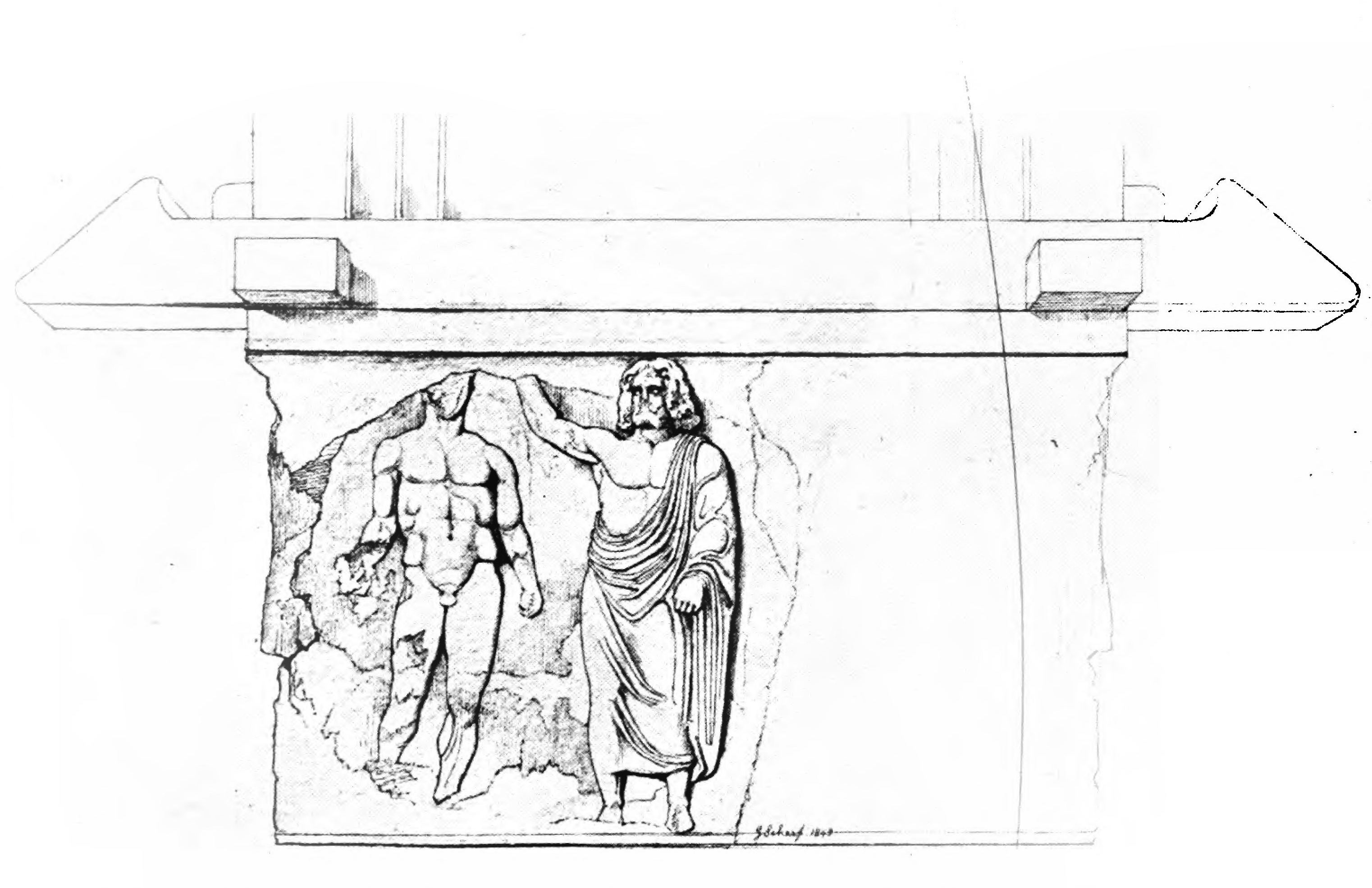
Tomb of Payava, north side of frieze

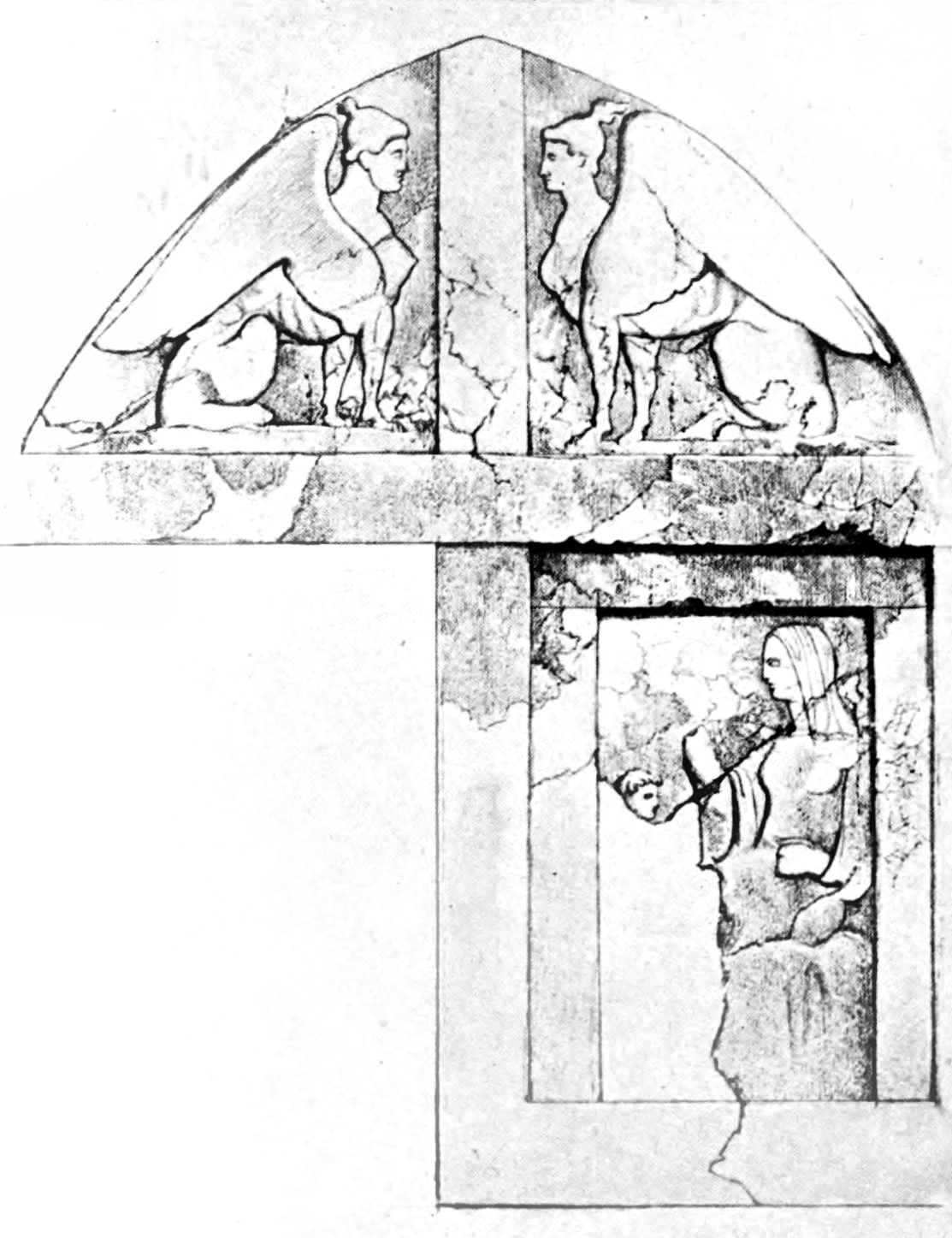
Tomb of Payava, north end

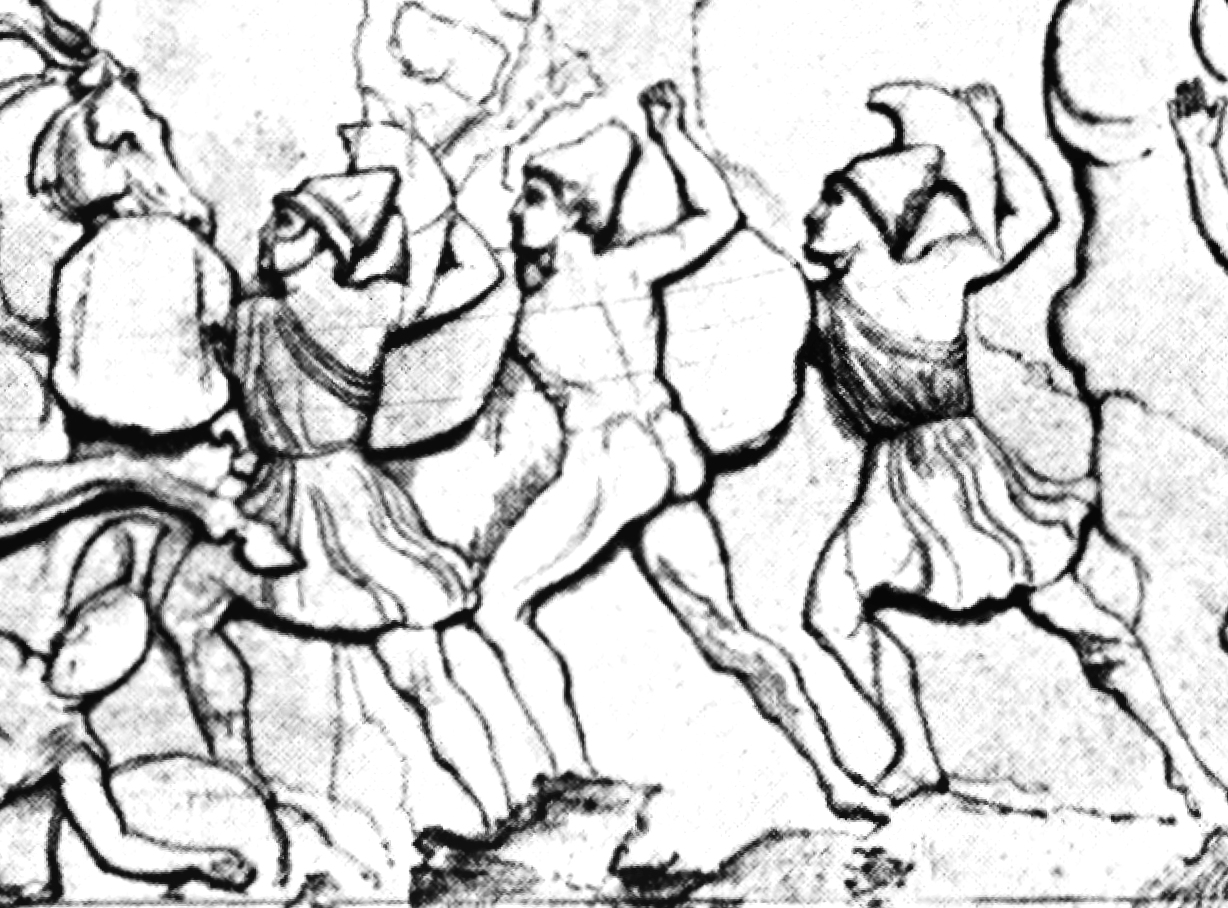
Tomb of Payava, east side. Peltasts fighting Payava on his horse.

== Indian architectural parallels ==
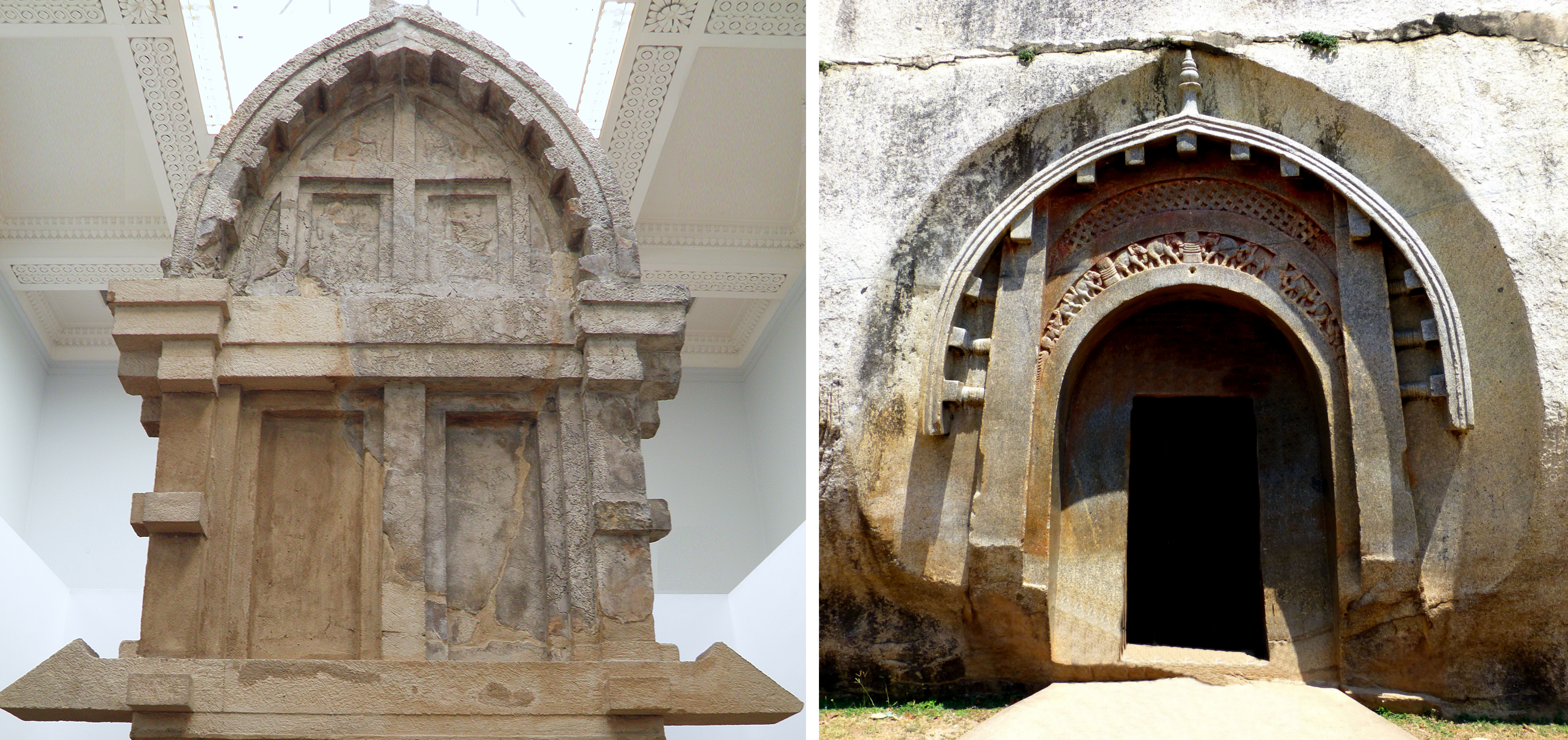
Lycian Tomb of Payava (left, dated 375-360 BCE) and Lomas Rishi cave entrance (right, dated circa 250 BCE).

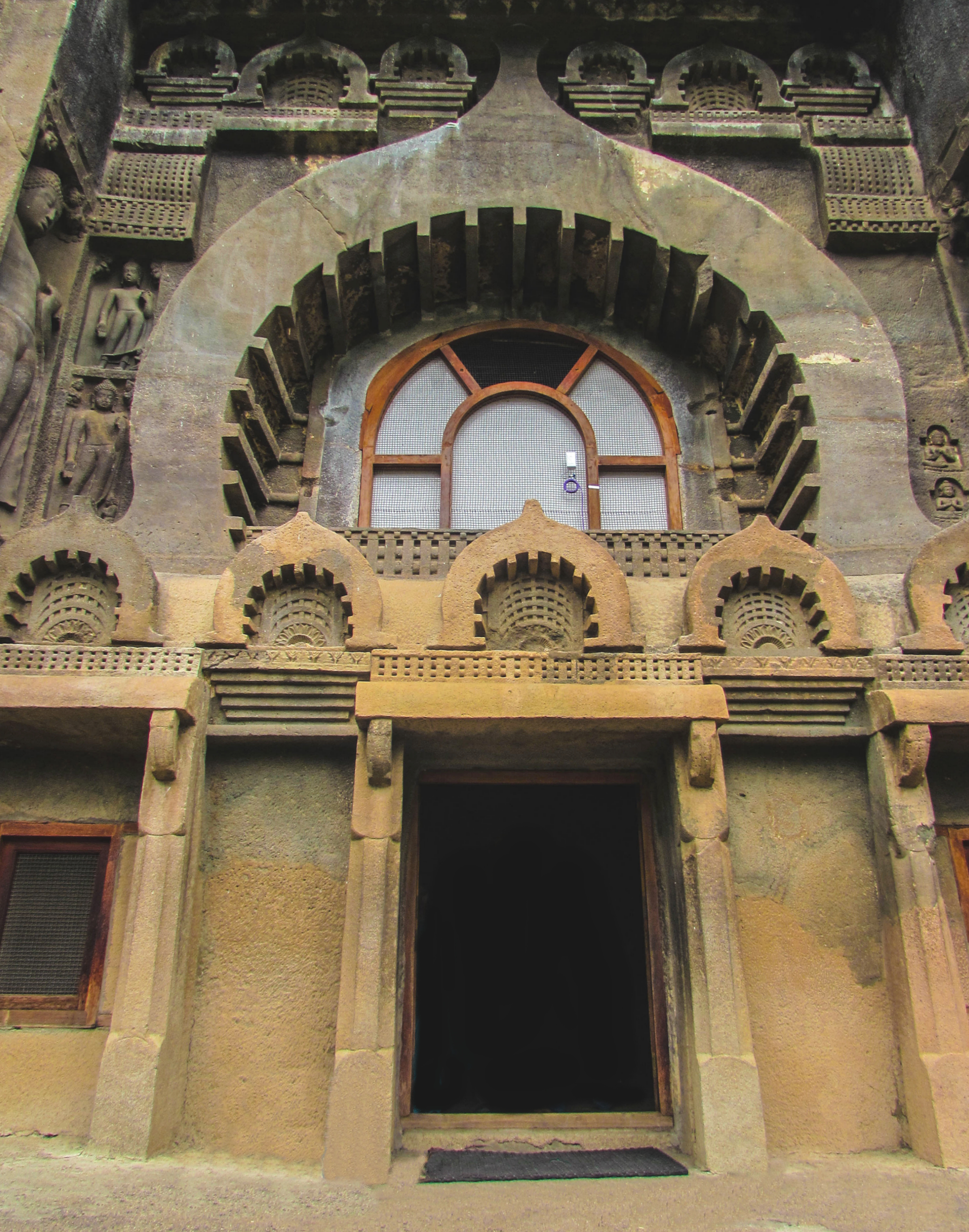
Ajanta Cave 9 (dated 1st century BCE)

The similarity of the Payava tomb, and more generally the Lycian barrel-vaulted tombs of the 4th century BCE, with the Indian Chaitya architectural design (starting from circa 250 BCE with the Lomas Rishi caves in the Barabar caves group) has also been remarked on. James Fergusson, in his " Illustrated Handbook of Architecture", while describing the very progressive evolution from wooden architecture to stone architecture in various ancient civilizations, has commented that "In India, the form and construction of the older Buddhist temples resemble so singularly these examples in Lycia". Ananda Coomaraswamy and others also noted that "Lydian excavated and monolithic tombs at Pinara and Xanthos on the south coast of Asia Minor present some analogy with the early Indian rock-cut caitya-halls", one of many common elements between Early Indian and Western Asiatic art. The designs of the Lycian rock-cut tombs were quite advanced from an early period, and it is likely that they travelled to India from the trade routes, or that both traditions derived from a common ancestral source.

The Lycian tombs, dated to the 4th century BCE, are either free-standing or rock-cut barrel-vaulted sarcophagi, placed on a high base, with architectural features carved in stone to imitate wooden structures. There are numerous rock-cut equivalents to the free-standing structures. Both Greek and Persian influences can be seen in the reliefs sculpted on the sarcophagus. The structural similarities, down to many architectural details, with the Chaitya-type Indian Buddhist temple designs, such as the "same pointed form of roof, with a ridge", are further developed in The cave temples of India. Fergusson went on to suggest an "Indian connection", and some form of cultural transfer across the Achaemenid Empire. Overall, the ancient transfer of Lycian designs for rock-cut monuments to India is considered as "quite likely".

The known Indian designs for the Chaityas only start from circa 250 BCE with the Lomas Rishi caves in the Barabar caves group, and therefore postdate the Xanthos barrel-vaulted tombs by at least one century. The Achaemenids occupied the northwestern parts of India from circa 515 BCE to 323 BCE following the Achaemenid conquest of the Indus Valley, before they were replaced with the Indian campaign of Alexander the Great and subsequent Hellenistic influence in the region.

Anthropologist David Napier has also proposed a reverse relationship, claiming that the Payava tomb was a descendant of an ancient South Asian style, and that Payava may actually have been a Graeco-Indian named "Pallava".

== Sources ==
- Dusinberre, Elspeth R.M. (2013). Empire, Authority, and Autonomy in Achaemenid Anatolia. Cambridge University Press. ISBN 978-1107018266.
- Michailidis, Melanie (2009). "Empty Graves: The Tomb Towers of Northern Iran". In Gacek, Tomasz; Pstrusińska, Jadwiga (eds.). Proceedings of the Ninth Conference of the European Society for Central Asian Studies. Cambridge Scholars Publishing. ISBN 978-1443815024.
- British Museum information board in room 20
