= Harpy Tomb =

Tomb in Turkey

Coordinates: 36°21′24.5″N 29°19′4.7″E

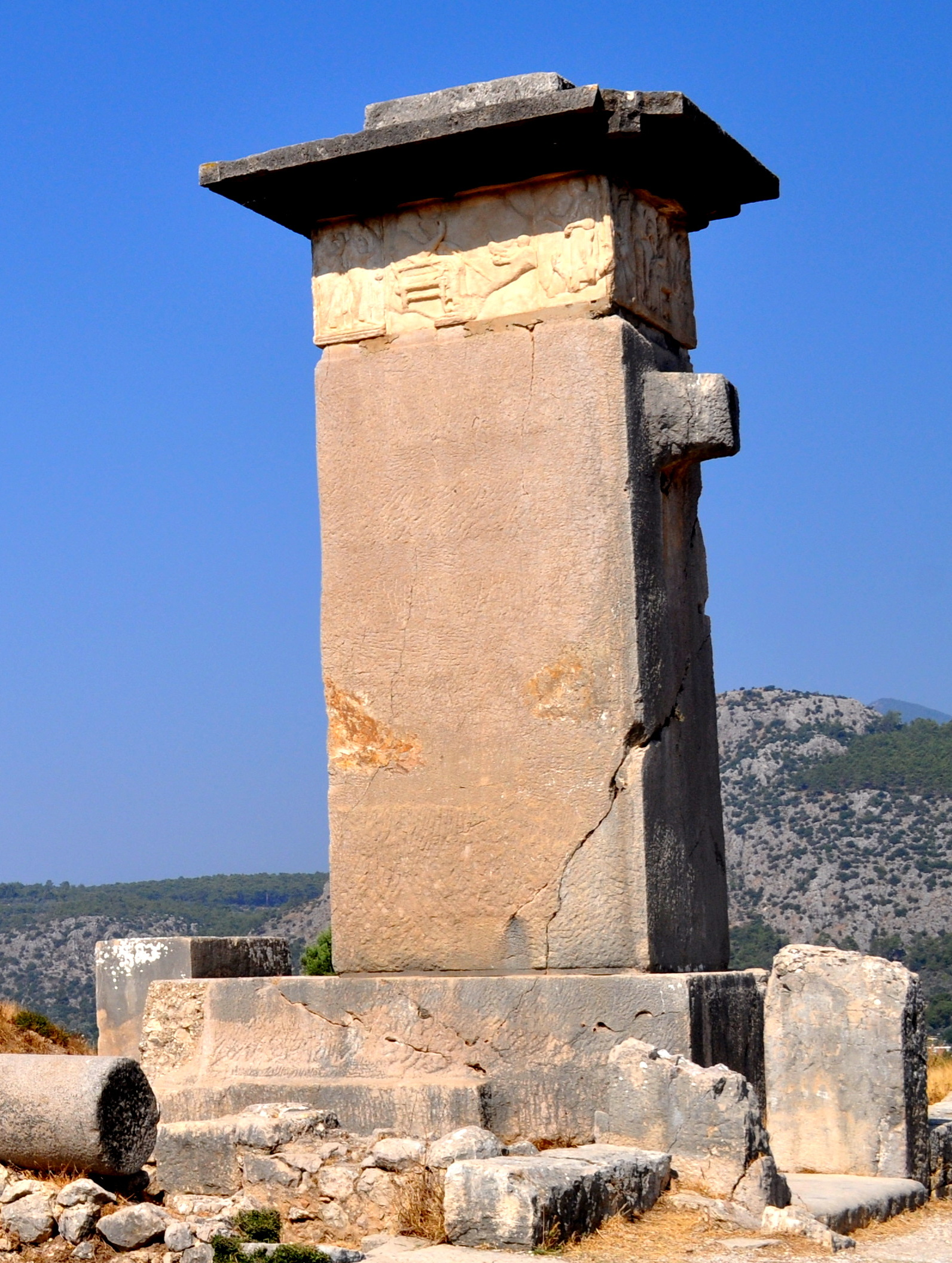
Harpy Tomb of Xanthos

The Harpy Tomb is a marble chamber from a pillar tomb that stands in the abandoned city of Xanthos, capital of ancient Lycia, a region of southwestern Anatolia in what is now Turkey. Built in the Persian Achaemenid Empire, and dating to approximately 480–470 BC, the chamber topped a tall pillar and was decorated with marble panels carved in bas-relief. The tomb was built for an Iranian prince or governor of Xanthus, perhaps Kybernis.

The marble chamber is carved in the Greek Archaic style. Along with much other material in Xanthos it is heavily influenced by Greek art, but there are also indications of non-Greek influence in the carvings. The reliefs are reminiscent of reliefs at Persepolis. The monument takes its name from the four carved female winged figures, resembling Harpies. The identities of the carved figures and the meaning of the scenes depicted are uncertain, but it is generally now agreed that the winged creatures are not Harpies. The Lycians absorbed much of Greek mythology into their own culture and the scenes may represent Greek deities, but it is also possible they are unknown Lycian deities. An alternative interpretation is that they represent scenes of judgement in the afterlife and scenes of supplication to Lycian rulers.

The carvings were removed from the tomb in the 19th century by archaeologist Charles Fellows and taken to England. Fellows visited Lycia in 1838 and reported finding the remains of a culture that until then was virtually unknown to Europeans. After obtaining permission from the Turkish authorities to remove stone artefacts from the region, Fellows collected a large amount of material from Xanthos under commission from the British Museum in London, where the reliefs are now on display. According to Melanie Michailidis, though bearing a "Greek appearance", the Harpy Tomb, the Nereid Monument and the Tomb of Payava were built according main Zoroastrian criteria "by being composed of thick stone, raised on plinths off the ground, and having single windowless chambers".

== Lycian culture ==
Location of Lycia

Lycian culture was at one time viewed as a branch of Greek culture by scholars, especially from the Classical period onwards, when Lycian architecture and sculpture were very much in the Classical Greek style. But the Lycians had a distinct culture of their own, and their religious and funerary rites can be distinguished from the Greek. The Lycian language, although it is Indo-European, isn't closely related to Greek and was instead more closely related to Hittite and most probably directly descended from the related Luwian language. Several groups speaking Hittite-related languages continued to exist in Asia Minor for many centuries after the Hittite Empire had passed into history.

Lycia occupied a strategic position between Europe and the Near East. The Greek and Persian worlds met in Lycia, and the Lycians were heavily influenced by both. At one period Persian influence would dominate and at another, Greek, resulting in Lycian culture being an amalgam of both.

Greek influence is found in Lycia from an early date. The Lycian alphabet is derived from Rhodian Greek, with borrowings from other alphabets, possibly Phoenician. The country was conquered by Harpagus in 540 BC, who was acting for the Persians. Lycia's culture was influenced by its annexation into the Persian Empire, but also by its neighbours, the Ionian Greeks. The influence of Greek culture increased after Xerxes' army was defeated at the Battle of Plataea by Greek forces in 479 BC. Kybernis, for whom the Harpy Tomb is thought to have been built, may have died as a consequence of wounds he received in the defeat of Xerxes, either at Plataea or the naval battle of Salamis. He was succeeded by Kuprlli, and then Kheriga, who took an Iranian name and appeared to be pro-Persian. After Alexander the Great's conquest of the country rapid Hellenisation took place in Lycia, and its culture became subsumed in the Greek.

=== Mythology ===
Lycia features heavily in Greek mythology. The Titan goddess Leto fled to Lycia after giving birth, or in order to give birth, to Apollo and Artemis. The Lycians play a part in the Iliad, under their leader Sarpedon, as allies of Troy. Bellerophon killed the fire-breathing monster Chimera which was ravaging Lycia.

These stories may well not have originally been part of Lycian mythology, but may have been borrowed from the Greek. The Greek goddess Leto, for example, may have been equated with the Lycian mother goddess. Having incorporated Leto into their pantheon, the rest of the Greek stories followed naturally. Certainly, the temple to Leto was of some importance in Xanthos. It would appear that the Lycians actively encouraged this synthesis in order to promote themselves as part of the Greek family.

Another story from Greek mythology concerns the origin of the name of the country. According to the myth, Lycia is named after Lycus, the son of Pandion, king of Athens. Prior to Lycus becoming their leader, the Lycians were known as Termilae. Lycus was later to help remove the usurper Metion from the throne of Athens. The real origin of the name, however, would appear to be a derivation of Lukka, the name of the country found in Hittite records.

=== Lycian sculpture ===
Lycian architecture and sculpture depicts skills similar to the Greeks, but to the Greeks, the Lycians, along with other non-Greek peoples of southwestern Anatolia, were often viewed as barbarians. From c. 550 BC, Greek pottery is found in quantity in Lycia; the Lion Tomb, Pillar of the Wrestlers, and the pillars at Isinda and Trysa are all distinctly Greek in style with little eastern symbolism.

Pillar tombs are the earliest form of tomb found in Lycia and go back to the sixth century BC, first appearing c. 540 BC. The pillar tombs appear to be reserved for leading dynasts. House tombs and sarcophagi appear from the mid-5th century BC onwards. Xanthos has 43 monumental tombs of which 17 are sculptured and 35 are pillar tombs, usually to a high standard of workmanship.

The Harpy Tomb belongs to the Late Archaic Greek style. The Archaic Style introduced an element of realism that was developed to its fullest in the later Classical Style, but retained some of the formalism of the earlier Geometric Style in its rules of symmetry. Of the many tombs at Xanthos, the Harpy Tomb is unique in period and style. Other well-known sculptures from Xanthos include the earlier Lion Tomb and the later Tomb of Payava and Nereid Monument.

== Tomb ==
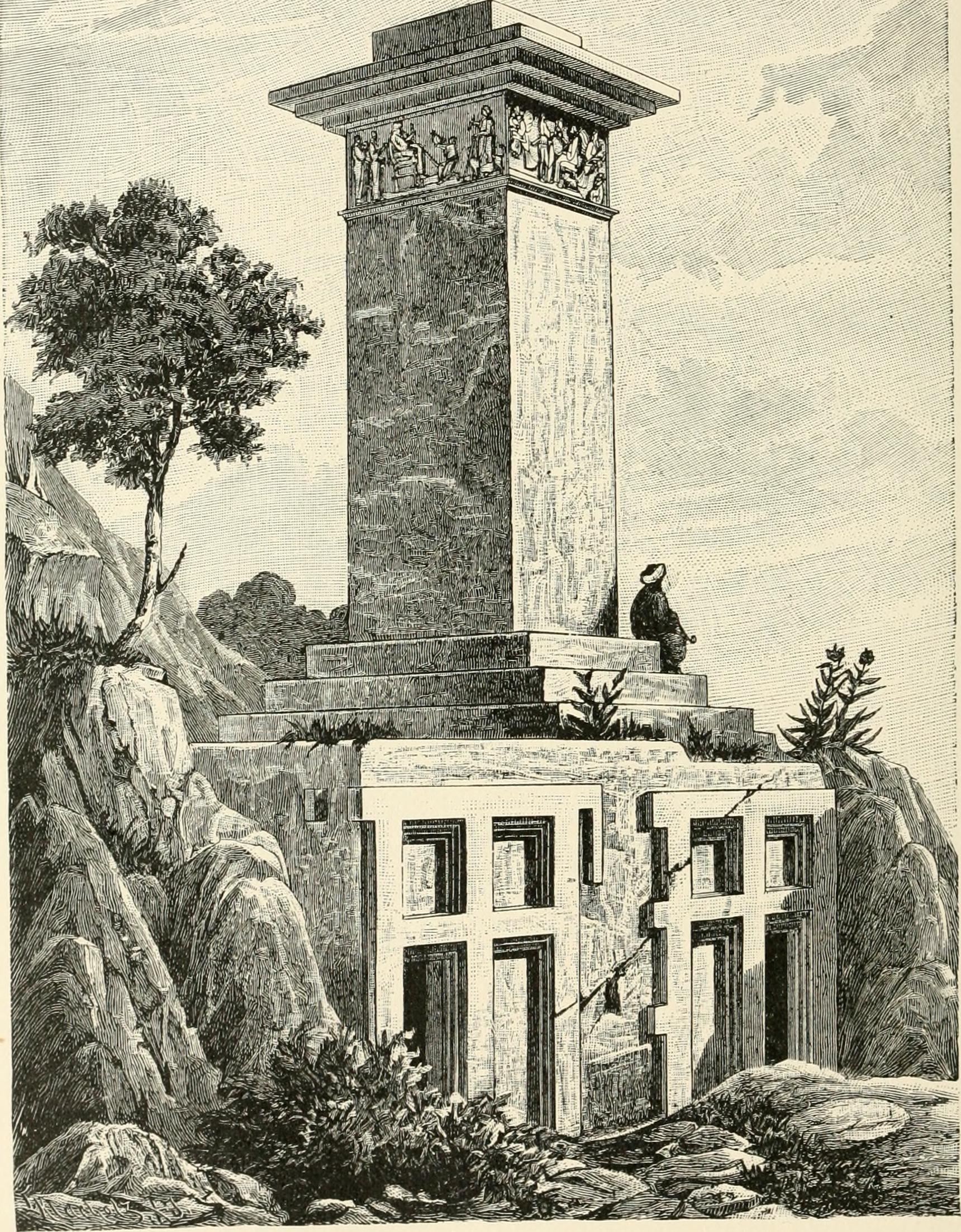
Harpy Tomb Reconstructed, 1905

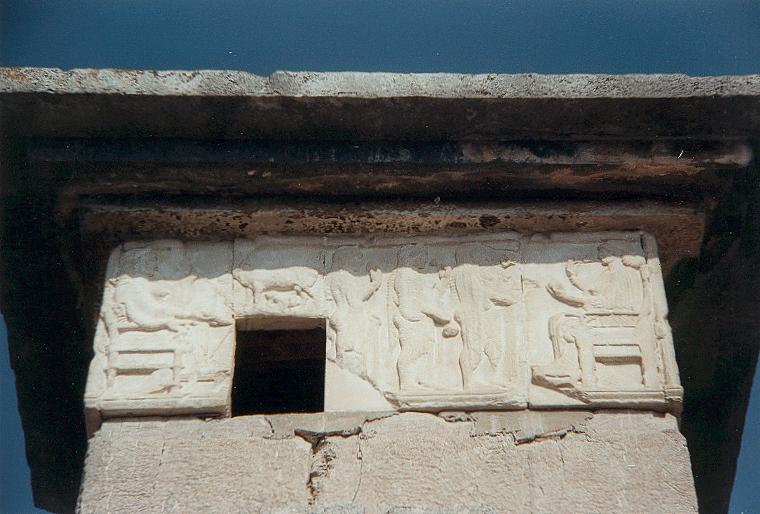
The replacement copies of the reliefs on the Harpy Tomb

The tomb was built in Xanthos in the Persian Achaemenid Empire (present-day Antalya Province, Turkey), for an Iranian prince or governor of the city. The Harpy Tomb is in the Acropolis of Xanthos to the north of where the Roman theatre now stands and on its west side. It would have originally stood on the edge of the marketplace. The original pillar is still in place; Fellows took only the sculptures, which have been replaced with cement casts of the originals.

The tomb is the only Late Archaic tomb in Xanthos to have survived the extensive redevelopment of the acropolis in the Roman period, and was left standing as an isolated historical artefact. Many other Lycian tombs survive in Xanthos, but there are no others from this particular period.

The space inside the tomb was later occupied by an early Christian hermit. Fellows noted that the backs of the reliefs still bore the remains of the hermit's religious paintings and monograms. Fellows speculates that this man was a disciple of Simeon Stylites (390–459 AD), one of the eponymously named Christian ascetics known as stylites, who lived on the top of tall columns.

=== Construction ===
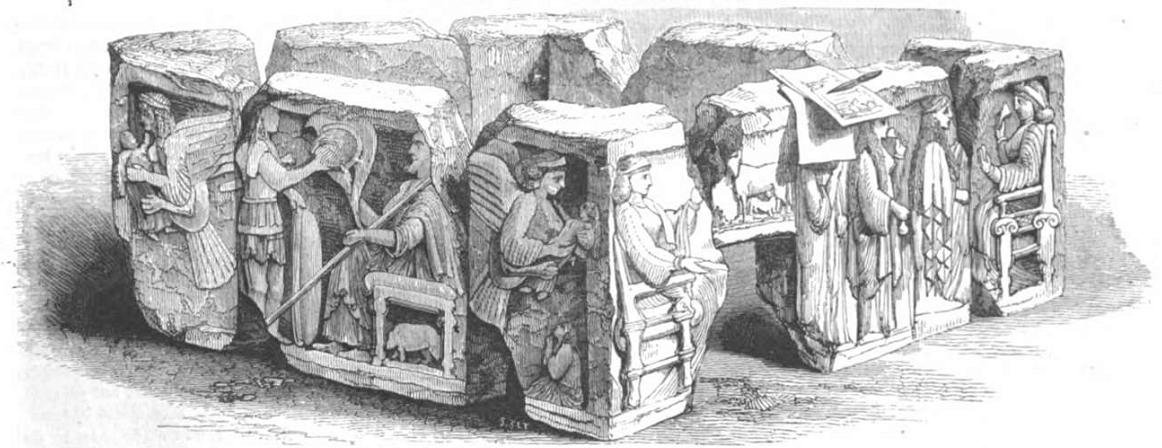
Reconstruction of the marble chamber.

The tomb is a large square of carved marble panels. Each side is 7 feet (2.1 m) in length and 3 feet 3 inches (1.0 m) in height. It was originally set upon a large oblong stone pedestal, 17 feet (5.2 m) high, making it an example of a pillar tomb. The top of the pillar has a hollowed out chamber creating a space inside the tomb 7 feet 6 inches (2.3 m) tall from the bottom of the hollow to the top of the reliefs. All four sides are carved with similar relief panels in one of which (the south side (Note: The cardinal directions are given according to the orientation of the tomb in its original location, not as it is oriented now.)) is a small opening to allow a body to be placed in the tomb. This aperture may originally have been closed with a stele. The tomb is roofed with what appear to be three large slabs, one above the other. In fact, the capstone is one single piece, weighing 15 to 20 tons, carved to give the appearance of three layers. Each false slab overlaps the ones below to form an entablature. All the parts, except the sculptured reliefs, are made from local grey-blue limestone.

=== Style ===
The tomb, along with many other artefacts from Lycia of the period, is in the Greek Archaic style. If the dating is accurate (480–470 BC) (Note: The dating is not very certain and had previously been put at as much as half a century earlier. This has continually been revised to later dates. Bond (p.12) writing shortly after the discovery puts the date at beyond 500BC, and is followed by Murray (p.121). Keen (1998, p.90) has 480–470 BC and Jenkins (2006, p.160) has 485–480 BC. The date in the article is taken from the British Museum web page on the object.) the Archaic style continued in Lycia for some time after it had become unfashionable in Greece. The sculptures may have been carved by Ionian Greek craftsmen, if not they are heavily influenced by them. There are some features of the carvings that definitely suggest a non-Greek origin. The female faces have full lips and large eyes that are typically Lycian.

== Reliefs ==
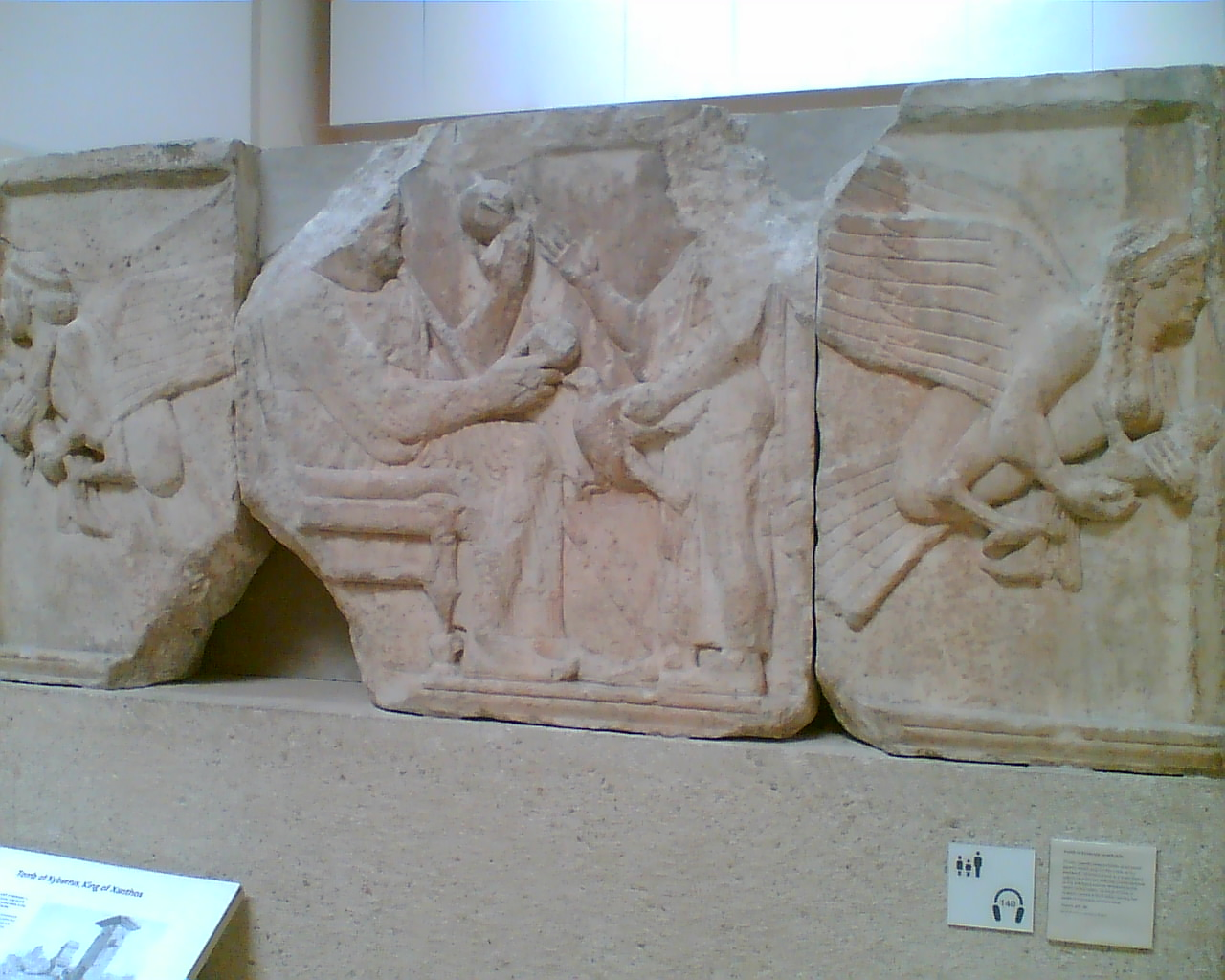
The Harpy Tomb reliefs in the British Museum

The reliefs show seated figures receiving gifts from standing figures. At the left and right edges on the north and south sides are winged female creatures with bird bodies (the "Harpies"). The winged creatures are carrying away small childlike figures.

Between the winged creatures on the north side is a seated figure receiving a helmet from a standing warrior; under the chair is a bear. Under the winged creature on the right is a kneeling female supplicant. Between the winged creatures on the south side is a seated figure of uncertain sex receiving a dove from a standing female. The seated figure is holding a pomegranate in the left hand and an unidentified object (possibly fruit or an egg) in the right hand.

On the west side are two females seated on thrones and facing each other. Their breasts are large and the nipples and areolae can be seen through their thin clothing. The one on the right holds in her right hand a flower and in her left a pomegranate. The one on the left holds in her right hand a phiale. The opening for insertion of the body is in front of this figure. Above the opening is a cow suckling its calf. This design is also seen on coins from the reign of Sppndaza (475 to 469 BC). On the right of the opening three female figures advance towards the seated figures. The second advancing female holds in her right hand a fruit and in her left a pomegranate flower. The third holds in her raised right hand an object, possibly an egg.

On the east side is a male figure seated on a throne, holding in his right hand a pomegranate flower and being offered a cock by a smaller standing figure. Behind the small standing figure is a male holding in his left hand a staff and advancing with a dog. Behind the seated figure are two advancing females, the first holding in her left hand a pomegranate.

It is thought the carvings on the monument were originally brightly painted. At the time of Fellows' discovery of the monument, the remains of blue paint were found in the backgrounds of the reliefs. Traces of red paint have also been found on other parts.

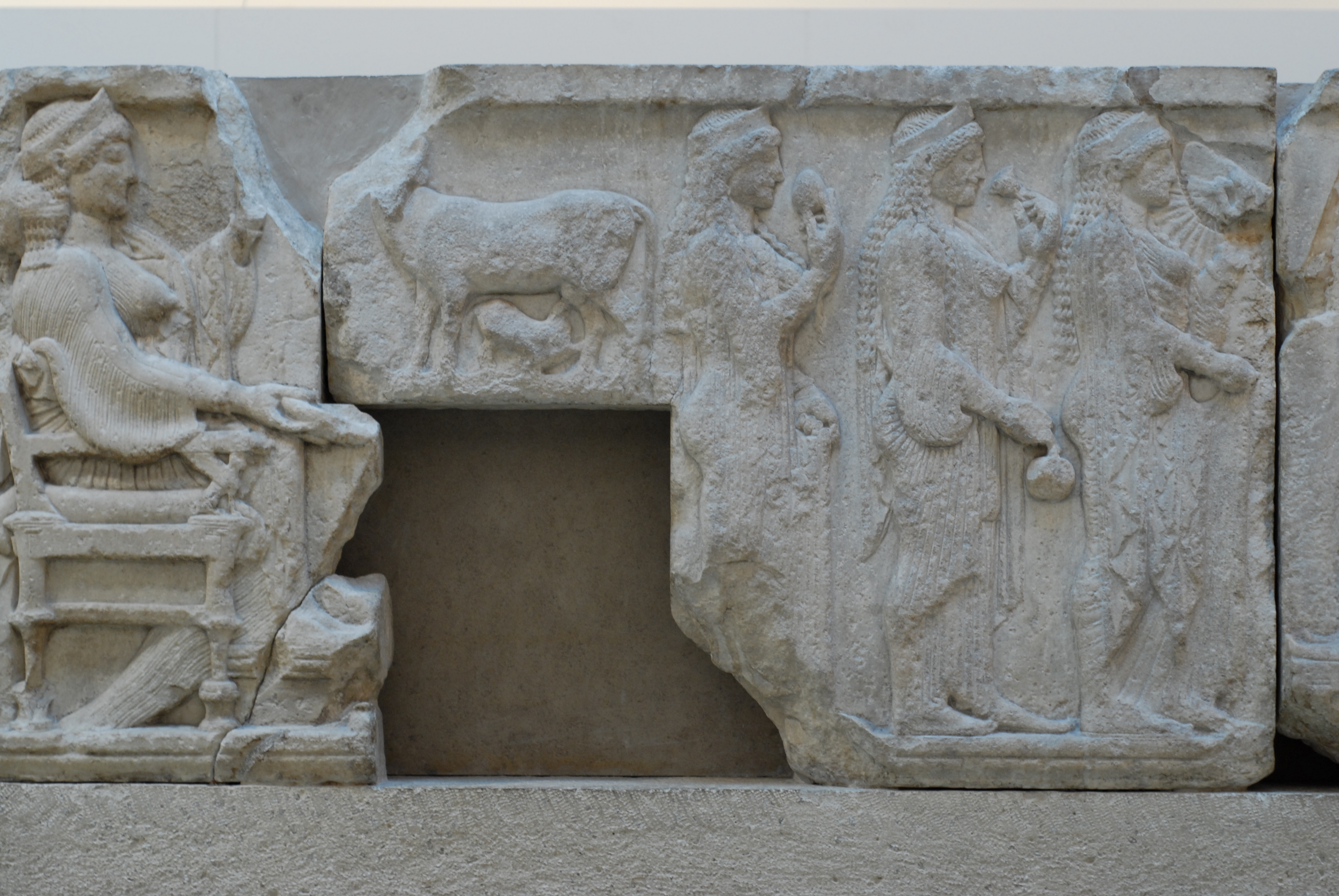
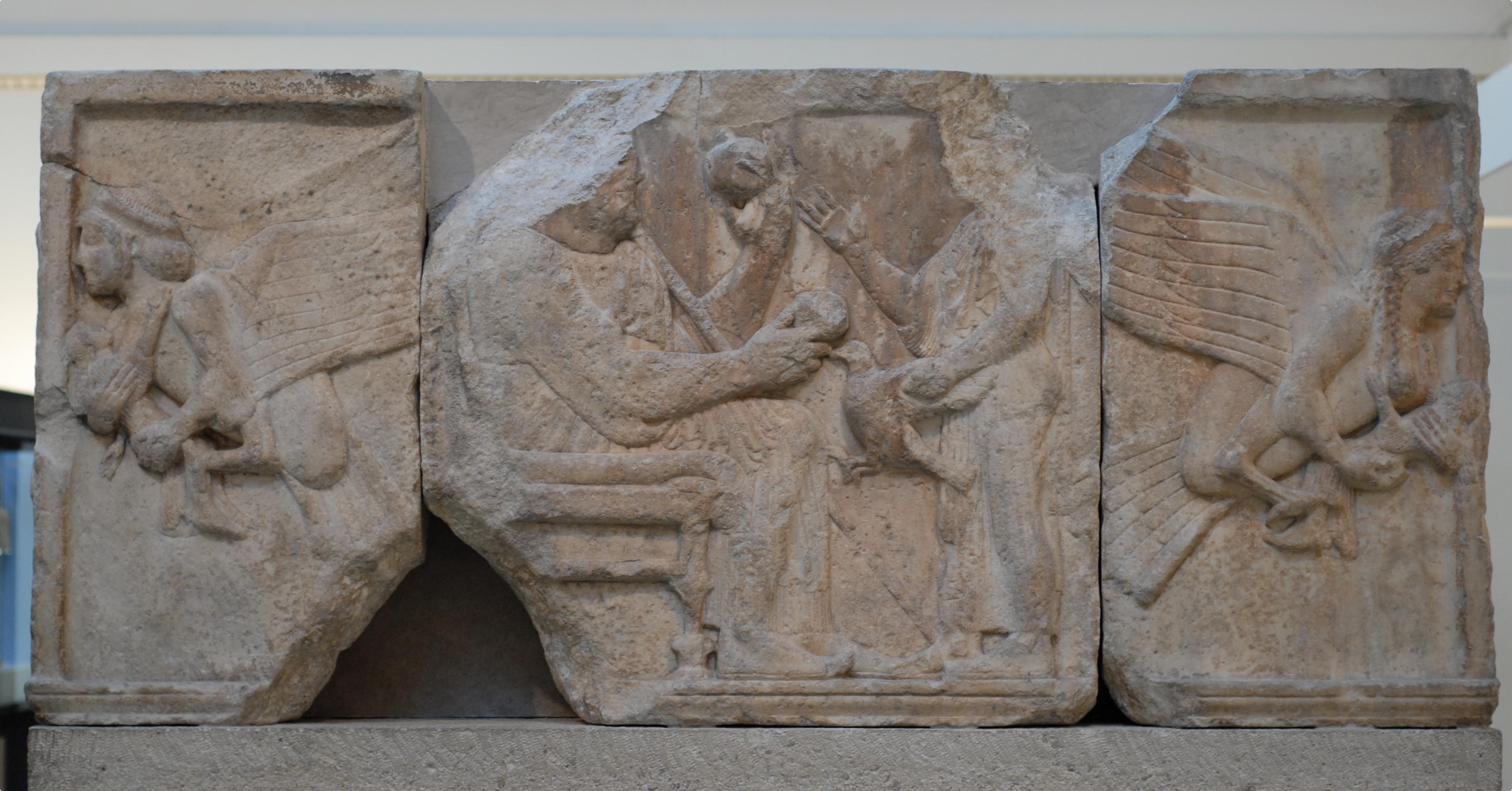
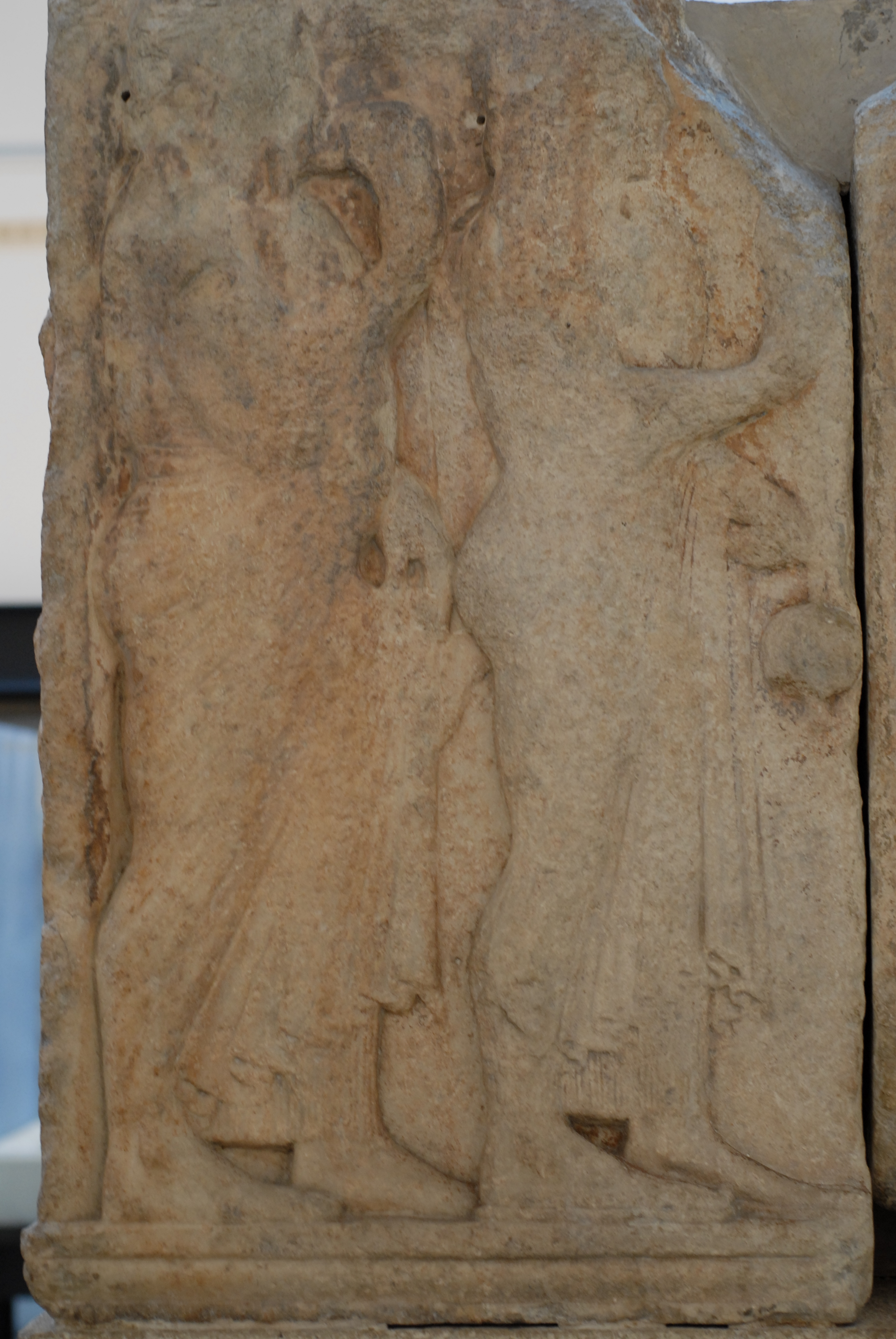
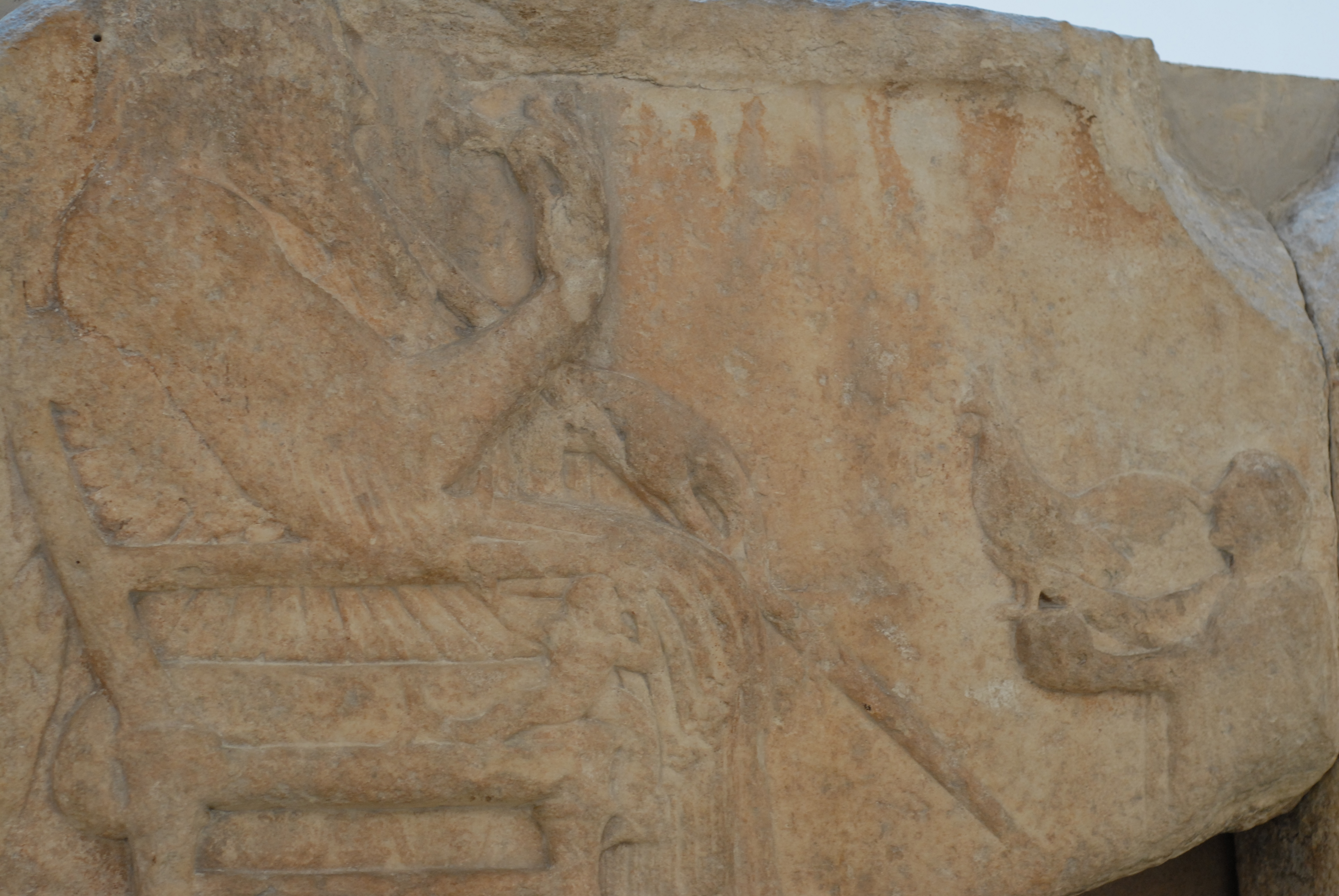
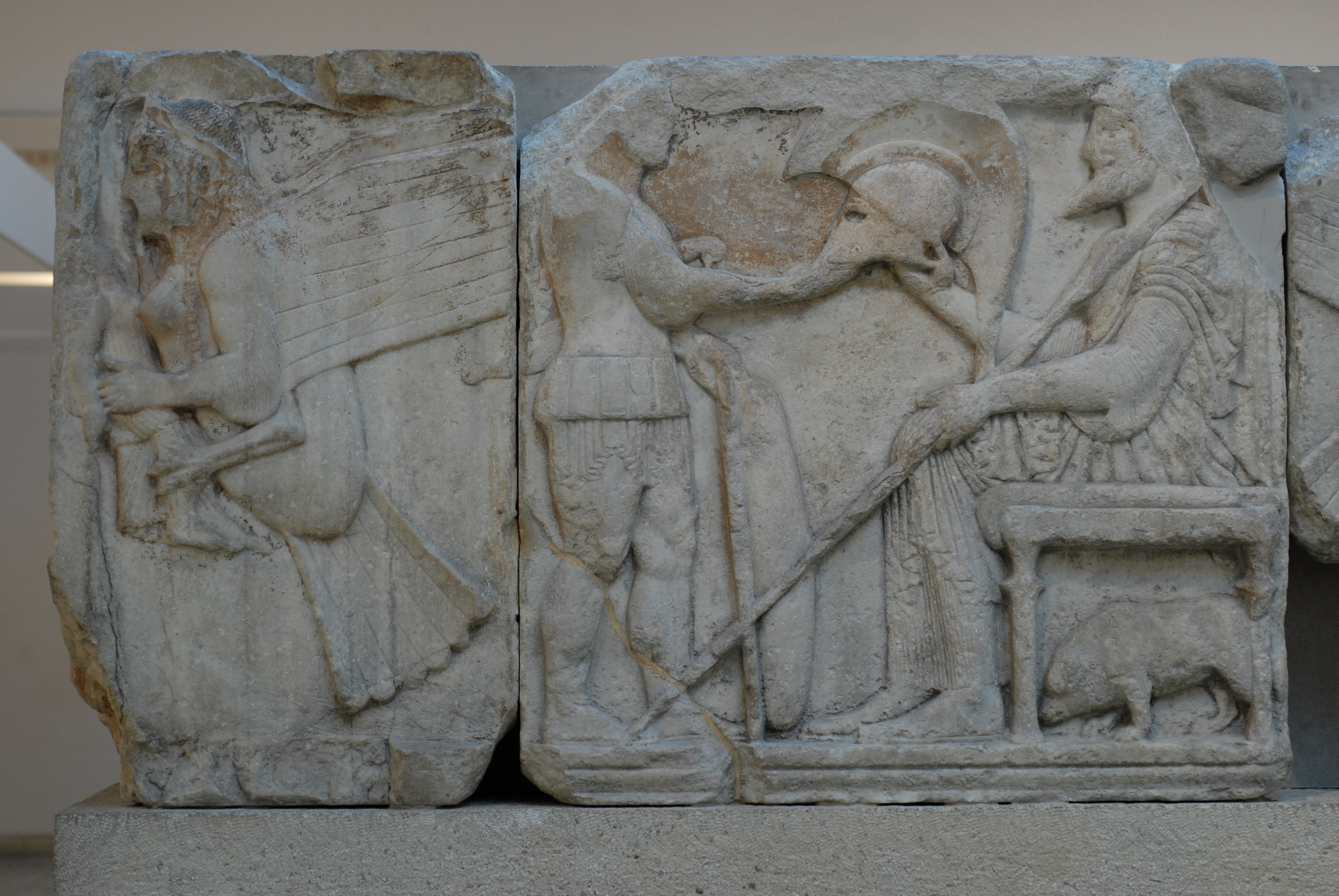

From left to right: west side, south side, east side (left detail), east side (centre detail), north side

== Assessment ==
The reliefs on the tomb show "a Greek–Lycian version of the audiences depicted at Persepolis".

Leo Raditsa, in the Cambridge History of Iran adds;

Instead of a miniaturized official before the Great King as at Persepolis, a boy offers a cock and a rhyton of wine to the enthroned governor. Common to Greeks, Lycians, and Persians, this ritual gesture of offering had a different significance for each. All saw the same thing and understood it differently – but not differently enough to be unaware that there were other ways of understanding what they saw. For a Greek the scene might depict the worship of a hero; for a Persian, an audience before the Persian governor of Xanthus, faintly reminiscent of the audiences before the Great King in Persepolis. These portrayals of Persia on a small scale reflect in their physical dispositions the spiritual idea of maintaining promises of obedience to superiors; everyone expected from those below him what the granted those above him. Greek craftsmen appear to have done all this work for Persian patrons – with the exception of objects found in graves and seal rings (impressions of many of which were found at Dascylion), which are of Persian manufacture.

== Interpretations ==
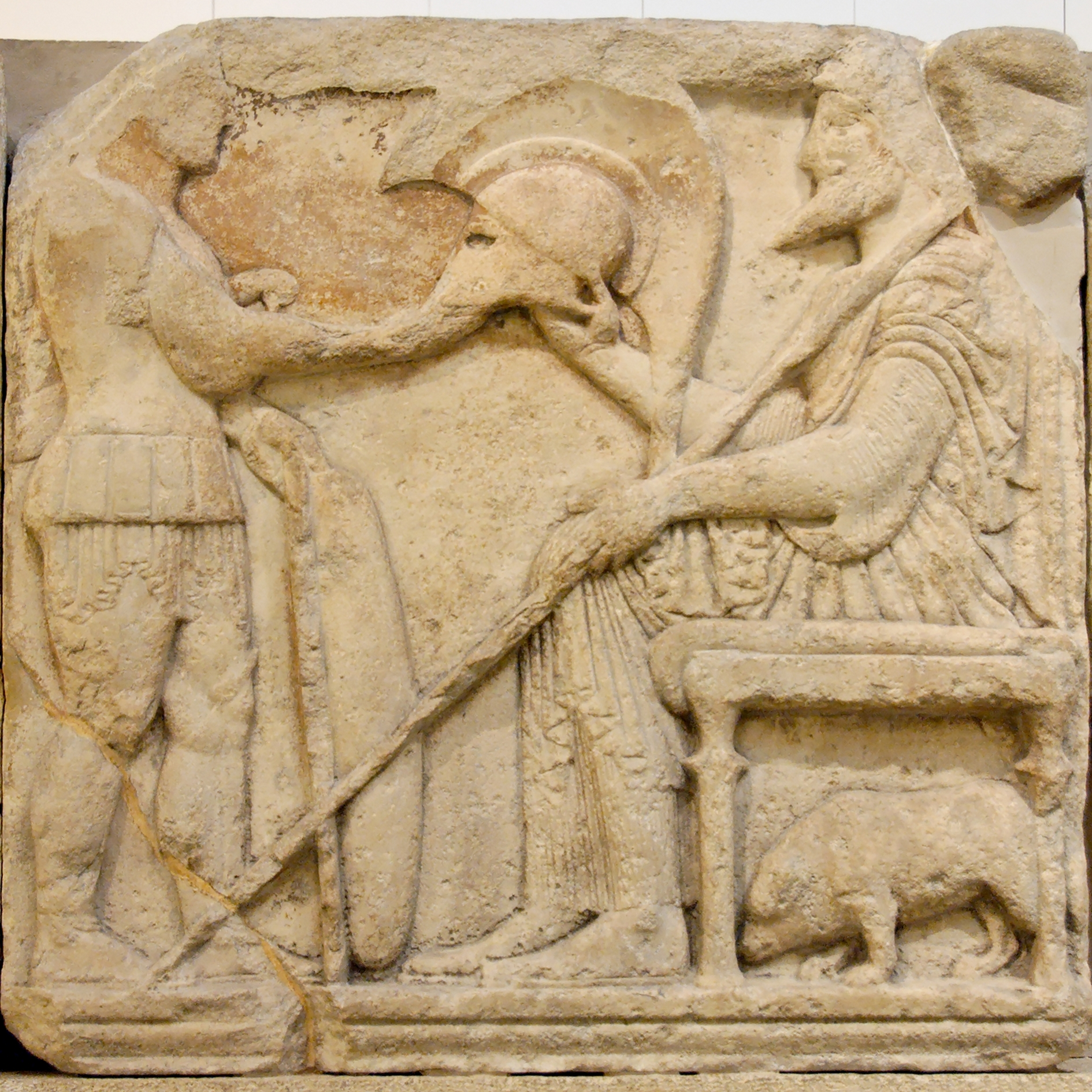
Probable depiction of the Lycian ruler Kybernis (520-480 BC), Harpy Tomb.

The seated figures are thought to be Lycian gods or deified ancestors. Among the possible identities for the seated figures on the north and south sides are Harpagus, the Median general who became the founder of the Lycian dynasty, and Kybernis, a later king of Lycia. Kybernis is proposed as a possible identity of the occupant of the tomb. Another view is that they are generalised scenes of judgement in Hades rather than earthly rulers. Consistent with this view is the interpretation of the south figure as Persephone, the Queen of the Underworld. The figures to the left and right of the opening may be the goddesses Demeter and Persephone respectively. (Note: Draycott 2007, for references on many interpretations.)

The repeated use of the pomegranate in the symbolism is not accidental. Not just in Lycia, but throughout Asia Minor, the Greek world, and Palestine, the pomegranate was widely recognised as a symbol of fructification and procreation. Conversely, it is also a symbol of change and death. This symbolism can be helpful in identifying the deities in the reliefs. The pomegranate is a suitable gift for a goddess of sexuality such as Aphrodite who herself planted the original pomegranate on Cyprus. It is not a suitable gift for an intellectual goddess such as Athena. The pomegranate can have an overtly sexual meaning; Demeter complains that her daughter Persophone was "forced to eat the seed of a pomegranate" in the underworld, by which it is understood that she was raped.

The winged creatures are likely not Harpies, but this misidentification has stuck in the name of the monument. A better match is to the Sirens but many sources doubt either of these claims. (Note: Keen (p.205) for instance, is unconvinced; Draycott 2008, argues that the abduction of the girls is an action more often associated with harpies than sirens.) The small figures they are carrying away may represent the souls of the dead. Another suggestion for the small figures are that they are the daughters of the hero Pandareus who were carried away to become servants of the Furies.

== Removal of the sculptures ==
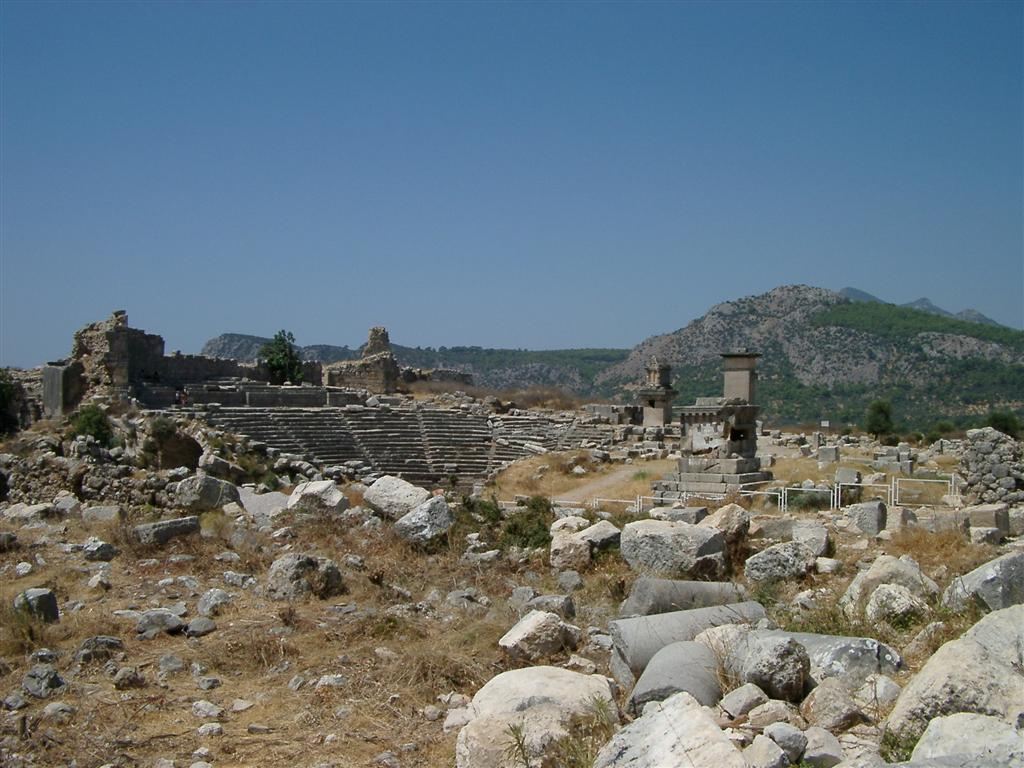
View of the Roman theatre at Xanthos with the Acropolis lying behind it. The Harpy Tomb can be seen in the background to the right of the theatre. It is adjacent to, and north of, a later Lycian pillar tomb nearer the centre of the picture. The structure in the foreground in front of the Harpy Tomb is a Lycian house tomb.

The sculpted reliefs were taken to England by Charles Fellows, who had been commissioned by the British Museum to bring back artefacts after they learned of his 1838 exploration of the region. Until then, Lycian culture was virtually unknown in Western Europe. The tomb was (and still is, minus its reliefs) located in the Acropolis of Xanthos.

Fellows received permission in October 1841 from the Ottoman Sultan to remove stone artefacts from the region. A Royal Navy ship, HMS Beacon commanded by Captain Graves, was tasked with recovering and transporting the items identified by Fellows. The ship sailed from Malta on 30 October but did not arrive on site until 26 December, delayed largely by unanticipated and protracted negotiations with the Turkish authorities. Fellows' documents did not give him the permissions he thought they did (he had not had them translated), and some of the British Government's requests were seen as unreasonable, such as removing stones from the walls of operational military fortresses.

A further delay was caused by a disagreement with Graves. It transpired that the ship had not brought suitable tackle for lifting the heavier pieces. Fellows wanted Graves to return to Malta immediately to fetch the necessary equipment, but Graves requested further orders from his superiors before doing so, which took some time to arrive. The Beacon did not finally return until March 1842.

To remove the sculptures of the Harpy Tomb the capstone, which may have weighed as much as twenty tons and was resting on the sculptured sides, had to be lifted off, causing the sides of the tomb to fall in. Fellows, who had left the sailors to carry out this task in their own way, remarked "but the sculptured parts did not receive more injury than they probably would have done from a more scientific operation". The sculptures of another monument at Xanthos, the Horse Tomb, (Note: Fellows in his original description of the expedition refers to this monument as the Horse Tomb and is followed by some contemporaneous authors. Later, however, he calls it the Winged Chariot Tomb (Fellows, 1852, p.498). It is now more usually known as the Tomb of Payava) were left in situ because they were so large that they could only be handled if first sawn into pieces. This Fellows would have done, but the stone-sawyers arrived from Malta with Graves so late in the season that they immediately succumbed to malaria and the task was abandoned. Nevertheless, 80 tons of material were put on board.

== Bibliography ==
- "Marble reliefs from the Harpy Tomb", The British Museum, archived 26 June 2010.
- "Relief panel from the Harpy Tomb", The British Museum, archived 26 June 2010.
- Ayliffe, Rosie, The Rough Guide to Turkey, London: Rough Guides, 2003 ISBN 1-84353-071-6.
- Bond, Edward Augustus, A Guide to the Exhibition Galleries of the British Museum, Bloomsbury, BiblioBazaar, LLC, 2009 (facsimile from 1837, London) ISBN 1-103-31927-2.
- Draycott, C.M., 2007: “Dynastic Definitions. Differentiating status claims in the archaic pillar tomb reliefs of Lycia,” in Anatolian Iron Ages 6: the Proceedings of the Sixth Anatolian Iron Ages Symposium held at Eskishehir, Turkey 16 – 19 August 2004, ed. by A. Sagona and A. Çilingirloglu, Ancient Near Eastern Studies supp. 20, Louvain: Peeters Press, 103 – 134
- Draycott, C.M., 2008: “Bird-Women on the Harpy Monument from Xanthos, Lycia: Sirens or Harpies?” in Essays in Classical Archaeology for Eleni Hatzivassiliou 1977–2007, ed. by D. Kurtz, with C. Meyer, D. Saunders, A. Tsingarida and N. Harris, Beazley Archive and Archaeopress as Studies in Classical Archaeology vol. IV/ BAR International Series 1796. Oxford: Archaeopress, 145 – 153
- Fellows, Charles, A Journal Written During an Excursion in Asia Minor, London: John Murray, 1839 OCLC 3444145.
- Fellows, Charles, An Account of Discoveries in Lycia, a Journal Kept During a Second Excursion in Asia Minor, 1840, London: John Murray, 1841 OCLC 1956989.
- Fellows, Charles, The Xanthian Marbles; Their Acquisition and Transmission to England, London: John Murray, 1843 OCLC 9793226.
- Fellows, Charles, Travels and Researches in Asia Minor: More Particularly in the Province of Lycia, London: Murray, 1852 OCLC 457874299.
- Fried, Lisbeth S., The Priest and the Great King: Temple-palace Relations in the Persian Empire, Winona Lake, Ind.: Eisenbrauns, 2004 ISBN 1-57506-090-6.
- Grant, Michael; Hazel, John, Who's Who in Classical Mythology, London: Routledge, 1994 ISBN 0-415-11937-5.
- Gruen, Erich S., Cultural Borrowings and Ethnic Appropriations in Antiquity, Franz Steiner Verlag, 2005 ISBN 3-515-08735-4.
- Hauser, Arnold; Harris, Jonathan, The Social History of Art, Volume 1, Hoboken: Routledge, 1999 ISBN 0-415-19945-X.
- Hehn, Victor Cultivated Plants and Domesticated Animals in their Migration from Asia to Europe, Amsterdam: John Benjamins Publishing Company, 1976 ISBN 90-272-0871-9.
- Jenkins, Ian, Greek Architecture and its Sculpture, New York: Harvard University Press, 2006 ISBN 0-674-02388-9.
- Keen, Antony G., Dynastic Lycia: a Political History of the Lycians and Their Relations with Foreign Powers, C. 545–362 B.C., Leiden, Boston: Brill, 1998 ISBN 90-04-10956-0.
- Michailidis, Melanie (2009). "Empty Graves: The Tomb Towers of Northern Iran". In Gacek, Tomasz; Pstrusińska, Jadwiga (eds.). Proceedings of the Ninth Conference of the European Society for Central Asian Studies. Cambridge Scholars Publishing. ISBN 978-1443815024.
- Murray, Alexander S., A History of Greek Sculpture, Whitefish, Mont.: Kessinger Publishing, 2004 ISBN 1-4179-1227-8.
- Raditsa, Leo (1983). "Iranians in Asia Minor". In Yarshater, Ehsan (ed.). The Cambridge History of Iran, Vol. 3 (1): The Seleucid, Parthian and Sasanian periods. Cambridge University Press. ISBN 978-1139054942.
- Weiskopf, Michael (1987). "ASIA MINOR". Encyclopaedia Iranica, Vol. II, Fasc. 7. pp. 757–764.
