= Charles Fellows =

British archaeologist (1799–1860)

Sir Charles Fellows
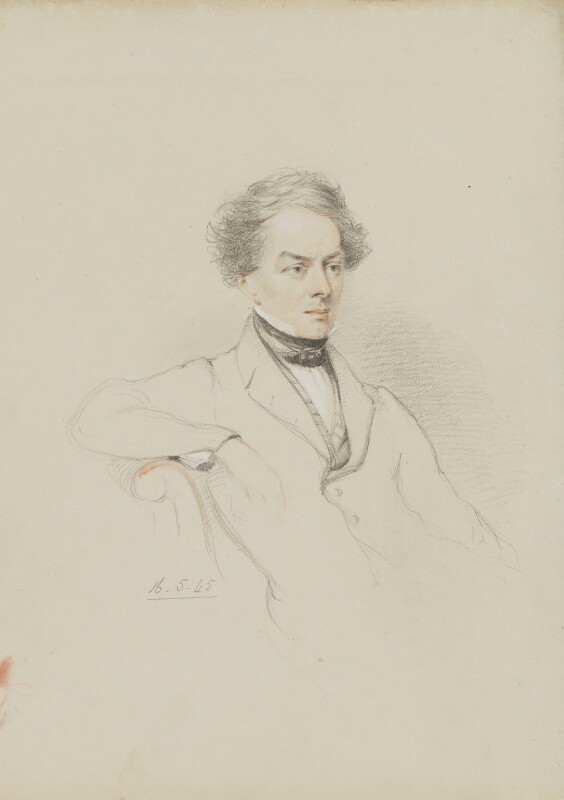
- Portrait by William Brockedon (1845), National Portrait Gallery, London
- Born: 31 August 1799; Nottingham, United Kingdom
- Died: 8 November 1860 (aged 61); London
- Occupations: Explorer, archaeologist

Sir Charles Fellows (31 August 1799 – 8 November 1860) was a British archaeologist and explorer, known for his numerous expeditions in what is present-day Turkey.

== Biography ==
Charles Fellows was born at High Pavement, Nottingham on 31 August 1799, the fifth son of John Fellows, a wealthy silk merchant and banker, and his wife Sarah. When fourteen he drew sketches to illustrate a trip to the ruins of Newstead Abbey, which afterwards appeared on the title-page of Moore's Life of Lord Byron. In 1820 he settled in London, where he became an active member of the British Association. In 1827 he discovered the modern ascent of Mont Blanc. After the death of his mother in 1832 he passed the greater portion of his time in Italy, Greece and the Levant. The numerous sketches he executed were largely used in illustrating Childe Harold.

In 1838 he went to Asia Minor, making Smyrna his headquarters. His explorations in the interior and the south led him to districts practically unknown to Europeans, and he thus discovered ruins of a number of ancient cities. He entered Lycia and explored the Xanthus from the mouth at Patara upwards. Nine miles from Patara he discovered the ruins of Xanthus, the ancient capital of Lycia, finely situated on hills, and abounding in magnificent remains. About 15 miles farther up he came upon the ruins of Tlos. After taking sketches of the most interesting objects and copying a number of inscriptions, he returned to Smyrna through Caria and Lydia. The publication in 1839 of A Journal written during an Excursion in Asia Minor roused such interest that Lord Palmerston, at the request of the British Museum authorities, asked the British consul at Constantinople to obtain a firman from the sultan to export a number of the Lycian works of art to England.

== Expedition to Lycia ==
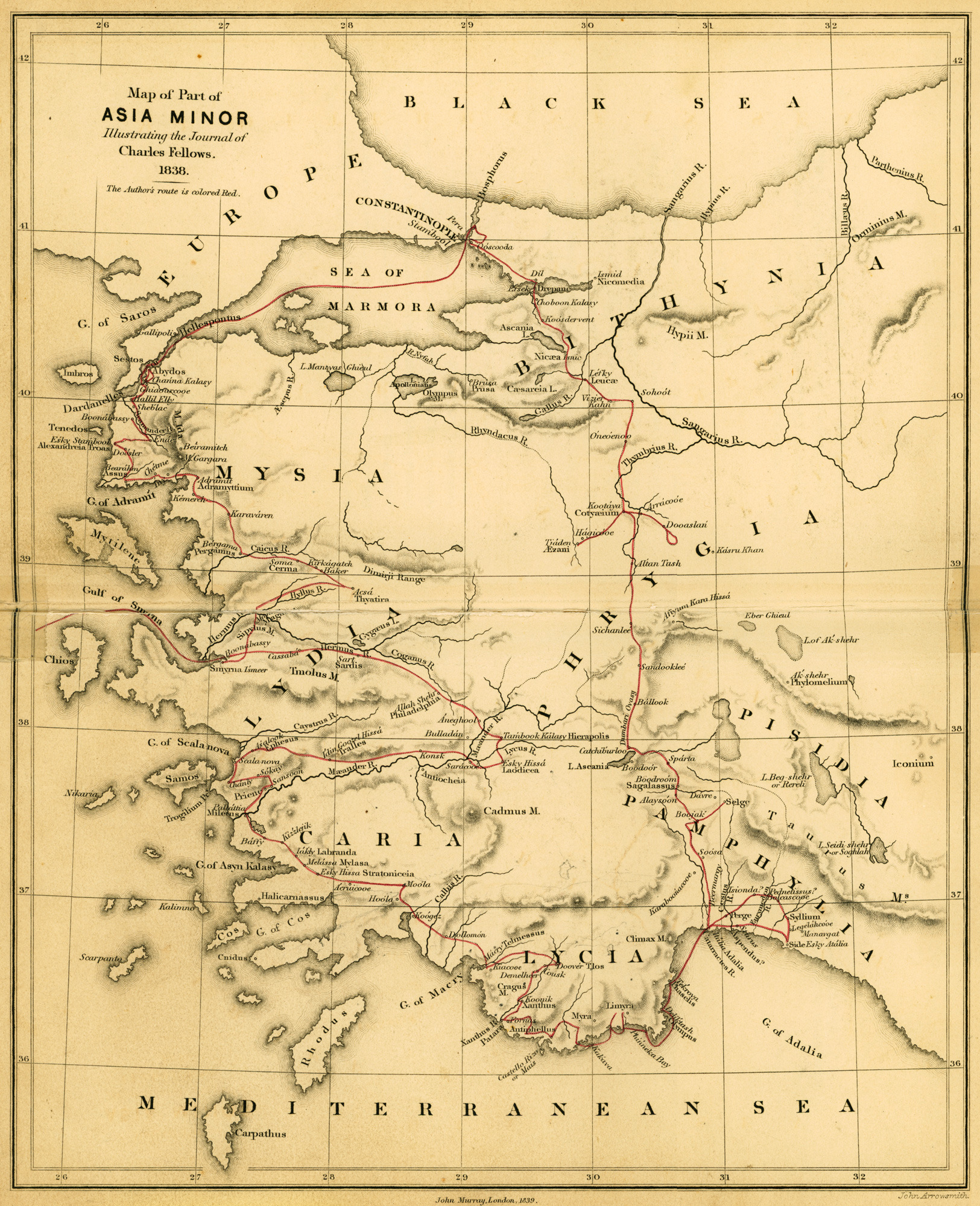
Map of Part of Asia Minor illustrating the Journal of Charles Fellows, 1838 (1839)

Having obtained the firman, Fellows, under the auspices of the British Museum, again set out for Lycia in late 1839. He was accompanied by the painter George Scharf, who assisted him by sketching the expedition. This second visit resulted in the discovery of thirteen ancient cities, chief among them Xanthos. He made a further trip in 1841.

Fellows led the archaeological excavation of Xanthos and other Lycian cities in Asia Minor and shipped an enormous amount of antique monuments to England, where they may be seen today in the British Museum. They include reliefs from the Harpy Tomb and the Nereid Monument, amongst many others.

In 1841, he published An Account of Discoveries in Lycia, being a Journal kept during a Second Excursion in Asia Minor. Three years later he presented to the British Museum his portfolios, accounts of his expeditions, and specimens of natural history illustrative of Lycia. In 1845, he was knighted as an acknowledgment of his services in the removal of the Xanthian antiquities to Britain. Fellows paid his own expenses in all his journeys and received no financial reward for his endeavors.

== Personal life ==
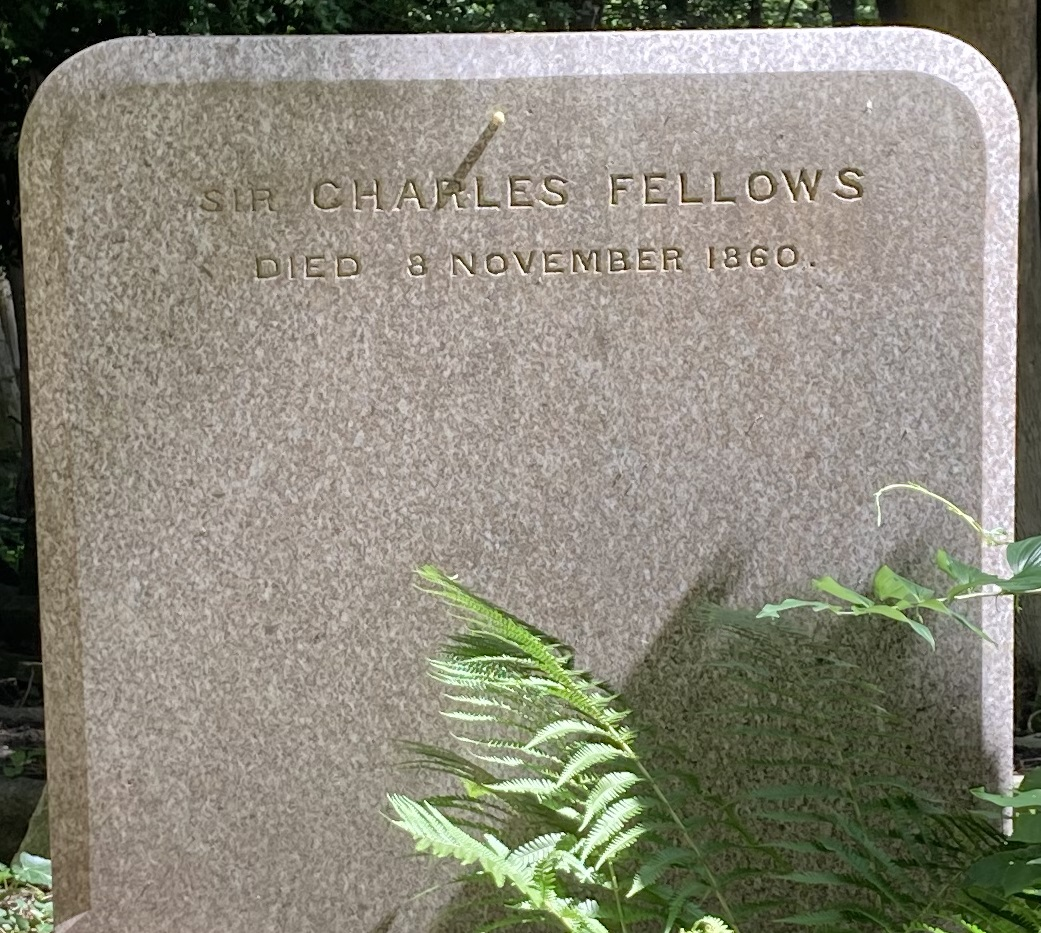
Grave of Sir Charles Fellows in Highgate Cemetery

Fellows was married twice, died in London in 1860 and was buried on the western side of Highgate Cemetery.

== Publications ==
- A Journal written during an Excursion in Asia Minor (1838)
- An Account of Discoveries in Lycia, being a journal kept during a second excursion in Asia Minor (1840)
- The Xanthian Marbles; their Acquisition, and Transmission to England (1843), a refutation of false statements that had been published.
- Lycia, Caria, Lydia, illustrated by G. Scharf, with descriptive letter-press by C. F, Part 1 (1847)
- An Account of the Ionic Trophy Monument excavated at Xanthus (1848)
- Travels and Researches in Asia Minor, particularly in the Province of Lycia (1852)
- Coins of Ancient Lycia before the Reign of Alexander; with an Essay on the Relative Dates of the Lycian Monuments in the British Museum (1855).

== Bibliography ==
- "Obituary (Sir Charles Fellows)". Journal of the Royal Geographical Society. 31: cxxii–cxxiii. 1861.
