= Milyan language =

Extinct ancient Anatolian language

Milyan
- Lycian B
- Region: Milyas, Anatolia
- Ethnicity: Milyae
- Era: First millennium BCE
- Language family: Indo-European: Anatolian; Luwo-Lydian; Luwo-Palaic; Luwic; Lyco-Carian; Carian–Milyan; Milyan
- Early forms: Proto-Indo-European: Proto-Anatolian
- Writing system: Lycian script

Language codes
- ISO 639-3: imy
- Glottolog: mily1238

Milyan, also known as Lycian B and previously Lycian 2, is an extinct ancient Anatolian language. It is attested from three inscriptions: two poems of 34 and 71 engraved lines, respectively, on the so-called Xanthian stele (or Xanthian Obelisk, found at Xanthos (which was known to the Lycians as Arñna), and another, shorter, inscription (nine lines) on a sarcophagus at Antiphellus (Habessus). All three poems are divided in strophes.

== Name ==
The contemporaneous endonym of the language is unknown. The name Milyan was given to it by modern scholars, who believed that it was the language of the Milyae (Μιλύαι), or Milyans, also known by the exonyms Sólymoi (Σόλυμοι), Solymi and Solymians. The Milyae were believed to have preceded the Lycians, Pisidians and Phrygians as the main inhabitants of Milyas.

"Milyan" may be regarded as a misnomer, because Milyas proper was an isolated, inland part of Lycia, whereas all known "Milyan" language inscriptions are from the near-coastal cities of Xanthos and Antiphellos. The alternate name, "Lycian B", stresses the close likeness to Lycian A. Diether Schürr characterizes the Lycian B as "poetical Lycian, with some conservative traits, a few idiosyncratic developments, and some elements that it shares with Carian".

Regardless of the name used, the consensus view is that Milyan/Lycian B is a dialect of Lycian.

== History ==
=== Documentation ===
On the Xanthian stele are two Milyan texts:

- On the lower half of the northern side of the stele are 34 engraved lines, a poem of 14 strophes. Its leitmotiv seems to be how the Lycian king Kheriga received his orders for military activities as well as divine help from the gods, especially from Natri (the Lycian equivalent of Apollo) and the Weather god Trqqiz (Tarḫunz). Below the last strophe there is an empty space, which shows that the poem is complete and that the text on the west side of the stele (formerly thought to be a continuation of the north side text) is a separate poem. It has also been argued that the poem takes place widely on the mythological level, in which the assembly of gods discusses the military offenses of the Lycian king as well as his generous amendments towards the gods.
- The west side has 71 engraved lines. The text is not complete: it breaks off in the middle of the 23rd strophe. This seems to be due to miscalculation of the engraver, who also made the mistake to engrave one strophe twice. Again, this poem is about the relation of Kheriga and Trqqiz, but Natri is absent and instead the "Nymphs of Phellos" make their appearance. A certain Muni is mentioned, possibly the widow of Kheriga who ordered the poem to be written on the west side of the monument. Dieter Schürr suspects that the central theme of the poem may be the legitimization of Muni's regency, possibly after a murder case.

The third text is the so-called Pixre poem on a grave monument from Antiphellos (a harbour city 30 kilometers east of Xanthos). Its nine lines make up thirteen strophes. Pixre apparently is the name of a Lycian poet buried here, who in the inscription tells of the "Nymphs of Phellos", who were his Muses.

==== Milyan poetry ====
All known Milyan texts — the two poems on the North and West side of the Xanthian Obelisk and the so-called Pixre poem at Antiphellos — are in verse. Strophes are marked off by the use of ⟨ ) ⟩. Dutch scholar Alric van den Broek and German linguist Diether Schürr also identify other structural features suggestive of poetry, such as ring composition, internal rhyme, and the use of certain key words repeated in the strophes.

Each strophe has about 45 syllables. A poetic meter is evident according to van den Broek. Using Ivo Hajnal’s definitions of Lycian B syllables, van den Broek suggests that there are a significantly high number of word boundaries around the 11th, 22nd and 33rd syllables, before the phrase-ending sign <)> (that is, on the left side of the sign). Therefore, van den Broek argues, the text is a poem with four lines per verse – and the first line is either about seven (six to eight) syllables long, or about 11 (10–12) syllables long. The last three lines of each verse are also about 11 (10–12) syllables. Moreover, the meter may include a four-syllable pattern, with accents on the first, fifth, and ninth syllables of each verse.

The phonological implications of van den Broek's model may also fit known features of accent in Lycian, Anatolian and Proto-Indo-European.

== Classification ==
Though quite a few words in Milyan are the same as in Lycian, differences are also obvious, some of them systematic. Milyan seems to be the more archaic language, as it preserves several early Anatolian characteristics, where Lycian shows a more innovative stage. This may have to do with the subject of the Milyan texts: while texts in Lycian are quite mundane (military exploits, tomb building activities), the two Milyan inscriptions also refer to religious rituals, where a more archaic sacred language may have been deemed appropriate (cf. for example the continued use of the words 'amen' and 'hallelujah' by Christians, or the use of Latin in the Roman Catholic Church).

Here are some differences between Lycian and Milyan, with examples (several examples show more than one phenomenon):

description	Milyan (Lycian B)	Lycian (A)
intervocalic *-/s/- in Lycian changed into -h-	masa, 'god'	maha, 'god'
intervocalic *-/s/- in Lycian changed into -h-	enese/i-, 'maternal, mother-'	enehe/i-, 'maternal, mother-'
intervocalic *-/s/- in Lycian changed into -h-	esete, 'peace'	ahata, 'peace'
intervocalic *-/s/- in Lycian changed into -h-	tbisu, 'twice'	kbihu, 'twice'
Proto-Anatolian */k^{w}/ becomes /k/ in Milyan, /t/ in Lycian	ki, 'who, what'	ti, 'who, what'
Proto-Anatolian */k^{w}/ becomes /k/ in Milyan, /t/ in Lycian	kibe, 'or'	tibe, 'or'
Proto-Anatolian */k^{w}/ becomes /k/ in Milyan, /t/ in Lycian	kere, 'territory' (or 'army')	tere, τere, 'territory' (or 'army')
Proto-Anatolian */du/ becomes */tb/ in Milyan, /kb/ in Lycian	tbisu, 'twice'	kbihu, 'twice'
nominative and accusative plural in -(i)z in Milyan	masaiz (nom. pl.), masãz (?) (acc. pl.), 'gods'	mãhãi (nom. pl.), mãhas (acc.), 'gods'
nominative and accusative plural in -(i)z in Milyan	tuweiz (nom. pl.), tuwiz (acc.), 'votive offerings'	tideimi (nom. pl.), tideimis (acc.), 'sons, children'
ethnonym in -ewñn- in Milyan, -eñn- in Lycian	Xbidewñn(i)-, 'Kaunian, from Kaunos'	Xbideñn(i)-, 'Kaunian, from Kaunos'
(sometimes:) intervocalic */u/ becomes -b- in Milyan, -w- in Lycian	xñtaba-, 'kingship'	xñtawa-, 'kingship'
(sometimes:) a/e Ablaut: /a/ in Lycian, /e/ in Milyan	mere, 'law'	mara, 'law'
(sometimes:) a/e Ablaut: /a/ in Lycian, /e/ in Milyan	esete, 'peace'	ahata, 'peace'
(sometimes:) initial */s/- becomes h- in Lycian, disappears in Milyan	uwedr(i)-, 'all'	huwedr(i)-, 'all'
conjunction se/sebe, 'and'	sebe, 'and'	se, 'and'
Milyan, unlike Lycian, seems to know u-stems	urtu (acc. sing.), urtuz/urtuwãz (acc. pl.), 'great (?)'	—

== Grammar ==
=== Nouns ===
Nouns and adjectives distinguish singular and plural forms. A dual has not been found in Milyan. There are two genders: animate (or 'common') and inanimate (or 'neuter'). Instead of the genitive singular case normally a so-called possessive (or "genitival adjective") is used, as is common practice in the Luwic languages: a suffix -si- is added to the root of a substantive, and thus an adjective is formed that is declined in turn.

Nouns can be divided in the same declension groups as in Lycian A: a-stems, e-stems, i-stems, consonant stems, and mixed stems; in addition in Milyan there exist u-stems. The differences between the groups are very minor. The declension of nouns goes as follows (endings marked in brown show differences from Lycian A; parentheses indicate analogous forms—the form given is not attested itself, but words from the same stem group with this ending are attested):

case		ending		masa 'god'	kere 'territory' or 'army'	zrẽtẽni 'protector'	klleime- 'tribute'	uwedr(i)- 'all' (adjective)	
case		animate	inanimate	(a-stem)	(e-stem)	(e/i-stem)	(inanimate)	animate	inanimate
Singular	Nominative	-Ø	-~	masa	kere	zrẽtẽni	(klleimẽ)	uwedri	
Singular	Accusative	-~, -u	-~	(masã, masu)		(zrẽtẽni)	(klleimẽ)		
Singular	Dative / Locative	-i		(masi)	keri	(zrẽtẽni)	(klleimi)	uwedri	
Singular	Possessive (genitival adjective):	-si- (Lycian A: -hi-)		masasi-	(keresi-)	(zrẽtẽnesi-)			
Sing., Pl.	Ablative/instrumental	-di			(keredi)		klleimedi		
Plural	Nominative	-iz (Lycian A: -i)	-a	masaiz		(zrẽtẽneiz)	klleima	uwedriz	uwadra
Plural	Accusative	-z (Lycian A: -s)	-a	(masãz)	(kerez)	zrẽtẽniz	klleima	uwedris	uwadra
Plural	Ergative	—	-ẽti					—	(uwedrẽti)
Plural	Dative/Locative	-e, -a			kere	(zrẽtẽne, zrẽtẽna)	klleime		
Plural	Genitive	?							

=== Verbs ===
Verbs in Milyan are conjugated exactly like those in Lycian A, endings are the same. There are two tenses, present-future and preterite, with three persons singular and plural:

			ending	sla- 'to sacrifice'	xra- 'to offer'	other verbs
Present / future	Singular	1	-u		xrau, 'I offer'	
Present / future	Singular	3	-ti, -di, -ni	slati, sladi, 'he sacrifices'	xradi, 'he offers'	sttã-, 'to become angry': sttãni, 'he becomes angry'
Present / future	Plural	3	~-ti		xrãti, 'they offer'	
Preterite	Singular	1	-xã, -(x)xa, -x			muwa-, 'to defeat': muwaxã, muwaxa, 'I defeated'
Preterite	Singular	3	-te, -de			erme-, 'to proclaim': ermede, 'he proclaimed'
Preterite	Plural	3	~-te			la-, 'to grant': lãte, 'they granted'
Imperative	Singular	1	-lu			pije-, 'to give': pijelu, 'let me give!'
Imperative	Singular	2	-Ø			pibi(je)-, 'to give': pibi, 'give!'
Imperative	Singular	3	-tu	slatu, 'he must sacrifice'		
Imperative	Plural	3	~-tu	slãtu, 'they must sacrifice'		
Participle passive			-mi/e/a-	slama (Plural), 'gift(s)'		xñtaba-, 'to regulate': xñtabaime/i-, ('what is regulated' >) 'ruling'

A suffix -s- (cognate with Greek, Latin -/sk/-), appended to the stem is thought to make a verb iterative:

stem as-, iterative of a(i)- (attested in Lycian A), 'to do, to make'; (Preterite 1 Singular:) asxxa, 'I always did, have made repeatedly'.

== Bibliography ==
- Shevoroshkin, Vitaly. "Anatolian laryngeals in Milyan". In: The Sound of Indo-European: Phonetics, Phonemics, and Morphophonemics. Edited by Benedicte Nielsen Whitehead. Museum Tusculanum Press, 2012. pp. 456–483. ISBN 978-87-635-3838-1.
