= Kherei =

5th-century BC dynast of Lycia, ruler of Xanthos

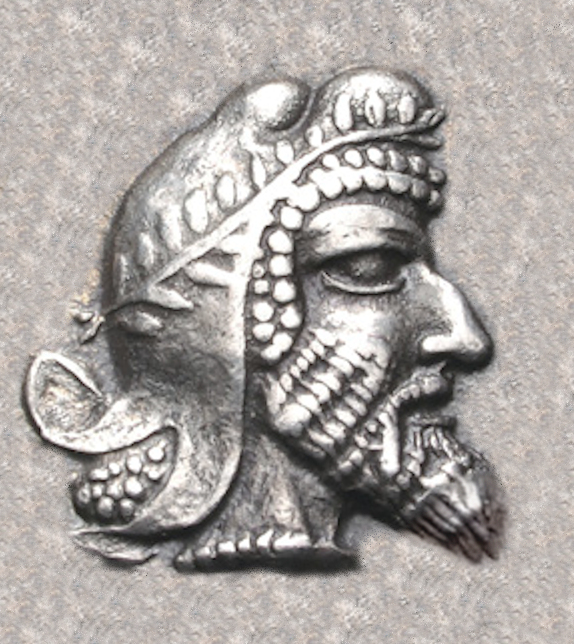
- Portrait of Kherei, from his coinage. He wears the satrapal headdress, decorated with a laurel wreath.
- Military career
- Allegiance: Achaemenid Empire
- Service years: fl. 410 – 390 BC
- Rank: Dynast of Lycia

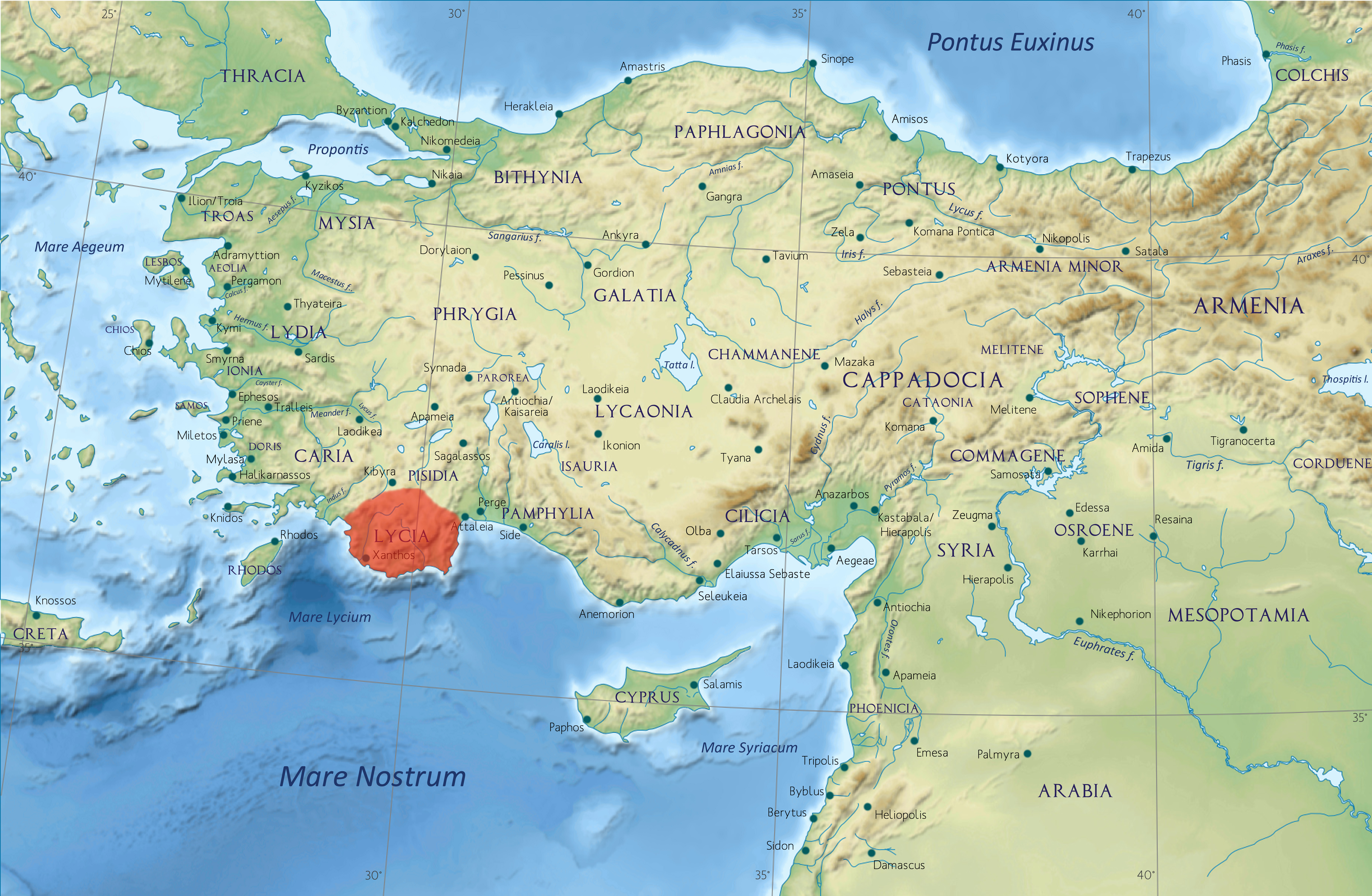
Location of Lycia. Anatolia/Asia Minor in the Greco-Roman period. The classical regions, including Lycia, and their main settlements

Kherei (circa 433-410 BC, or circa 410-390 BC) was dynast of Lycia, ruler of the area of Xanthos, at a time when this part of Anatolia was subject to the Persian, or Achaemenid, Empire.

Present-day knowledge of Lycia in the period of classical antiquity comes mostly from archaeology, in which this region is unusually rich. He may have been the dynast to whom was dedicated the Xanthian Obelisk, where he is mentioned in multiple places, although this could more probably be his predecessor Kheriga (Xeriga, Gergis in Greek). Kherei may have been Kheriga's brother, and succeeded him.

== Coinage ==
Kherei was among last the Lycian rulers to issue coinage. After 360 BC, the region of Lycia was taken over by the Carian dynast Mausolus.

The portrait on the coins of Kherei show the dynast wearing the Achaemenid satrapal headdress.

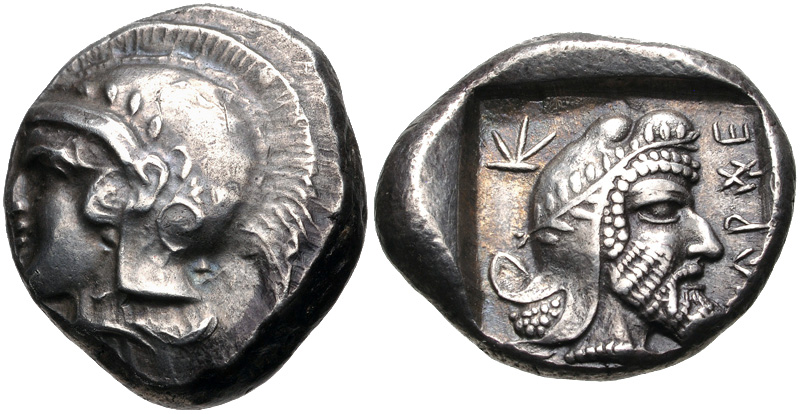
Coinage of Kherei. Circa 410-390 BC. Obv: Helmeted head of Athena. Rev: Head of Kherei, wearing Persian tiara decorated with laurel branch.

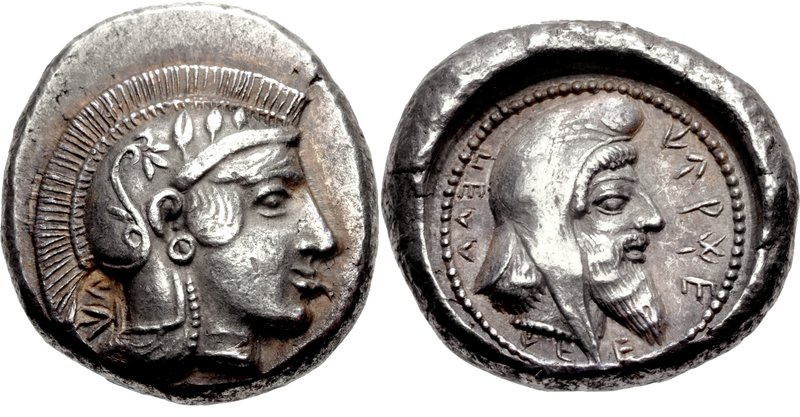
Coinage of Kherei. Circa 410-390 BC
