= Vitaly Shevoroshkin =

American linguist (1932–2023)

Vitaly Victorovich Shevoroshkin
- Виталий Викторович Шеворошкин
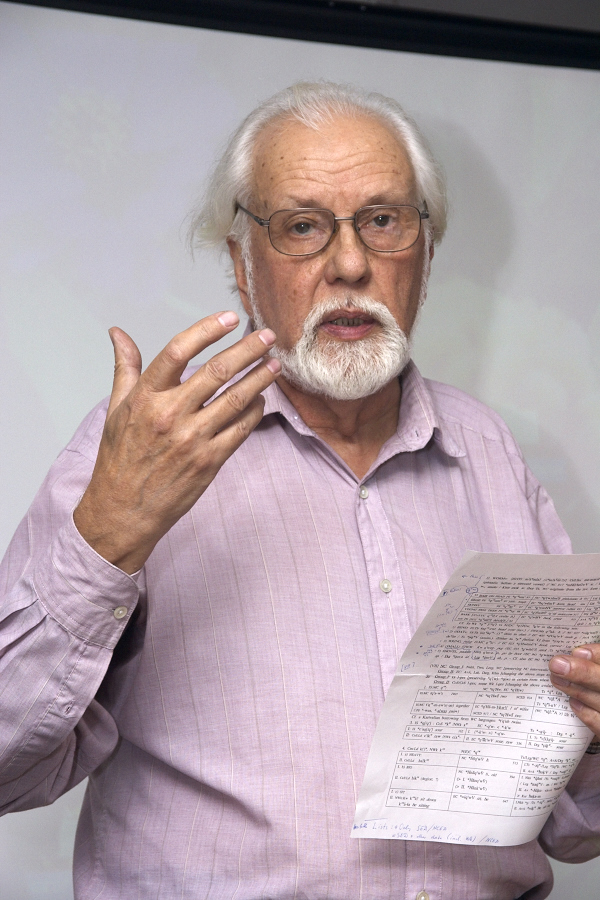
- Vitaly Viktorovich Shevoroshkin speaking at a conference in October 2004
- Born: 12 January 1932; New Athos, Abkhazia (USSR), Georgia (USSR)
- Died: 22 December 2023 (aged 91); Zürich, Switzerland
- Education: Moscow State University
- Occupation: Linguist
- Scientific career
- Fields: Ancient languages of Anatolia, Russian, distant linguistic relationship
- Institutions: University of Michigan
- Academic advisors: Vladislav Illich-Svitych; Igor M. Diakonoff
- Notable students: Andrey Korolev

Vitaly Victorovich Shevoroshkin (Russian: Виталий Викторович Шеворошкин; 12 January 1932 – 22 December 2023) was an American linguist of Russian origin, specializing in the study of ancient Mediterranean languages. Shevoroshkin was born in 1932 in Georgia (USSR). In the 1960s he tried to decipher Carian inscriptions and proved that their language belonged to the Anatolian languages. In the 1970s he emigrated to the United States. He was professor emeritus of Slavic Languages and Literatures and Linguistics at the University of Michigan.

Shevoroshkin was also a leader in the study of language in prehistory (paleolinguistics), and in publicizing the recent work of paleolinguists, especially Russians. In 1988 he and Benjamin Stolz organized the First International Interdisciplinary Symposium on Language and Prehistory, at the University of Michigan, Ann Arbor. Forty-six scholars participated as presenters and discussants, sixteen of which were from Russia and other eastern European countries (or recently emigrated therefrom). This symposium led to renewed cooperation among historical linguists, archeologists, and physical anthropologists from East and West.

Some of his work on the relationship between linguistic associations and the hypothetical Proto-World language is controversial. Shevoroshkin died on 22 December 2023, at the age of 91.

== Publications ==
=== Books ===
- SHEVOROSHKIN, V.V. & T.L. MARKEY, Eds. 1986. Typology, Relationship and Time. Ann Arbor: Karoma.
- SHEVOROSHKIN, V.V., Ed. 1989a. Reconstructing Languages and Cultures. Abstracts and Materials from the First Interdisciplinary Symposium on Language and Prehistory, Ann Arbor, 8–12 November 1988. Bochum: Brockmeyer.
- SHEVOROSHKIN, V.V., Ed. 1989b. Explorations in Language Macrofamilies. Materials from the First Interdisciplinary Symposium on Language and Prehistory. Bochum: Brockmeyer.
- SHEVOROSHKIN, V.V., Ed. 1990. Proto-Languages and Proto-Cultures. Materials from the First Interdisciplinary Symposium on Language and Prehistory. Bochum: Brockmeyer.
- SHEVOROSHKIN, V.V., Ed. 1991. Dene-Sino-Caucasian Languages. Materials from the First Interdisciplinary Symposium on Language and Prehistory. Bochum: Brockmeyer.
- SHEVOROSHKIN, V.V., Ed. 1992. Nostratic, Dene-Caucasian, Austric and Amerind. Materials from the First Interdisciplinary Symposium on Language and Prehistory. Bochum: Brockmeyer.

=== Articles ===
- SHEVOROSHKIN, V.V. 1978. "Studies in Hittite-Luwian Names". In: Names: A Journal of Onomastics 26:3. pp. 231–257. DOI: 10.1179/nam.1978.26.3.231
- SHEVOROSHKIN, V.V. & M. KAISER. 1985. "On Indo-European Laryngeals and Vowels." Journal of Indo-European Studies 13/3-4: 377–413.
- SHEVOROSHKIN, V.V. 1987. "Indo-European Homeland and Migrations." Folia Linguistica Historica 7/2: 227–250.
- SHEVOROSHKIN, V.V. & M. KAISER. 1987. "On Recent Comparisons Between Language Families: The Case of Indo-European and Afroasiatic." General Linguistics 27/1: 34–46.
- SHEVOROSHKIN, V.V. & M. KAISER. 1988. "Nostratic." Annual Review of Anthropology 17: 309–329.
- SHEVOROSHKIN, V.V. 1989. "Methods in Interphyletic Comparisons." Ural-Altaische Jahrbücher 61: 1-26.
- SHEVOROSHKIN, V.V. 1990a. "Uralic Vocalism and Long-Range Comparison." Uralo-Indogermanica 2: 85–94.
- SHEVOROSHKIN, V.V. 1990b. "The Mother Tongue: How Linguists Have Reconstructed the Ancestor of All Living Languages." The Sciences 30/3: 20–27.
- SHEVOROSHKIN, V.V. & A. MANASTER RAMER. 1991. "Some Recent Work on the Remote Relations of Languages." In Sprung from Some Common Source: Investigations into the Prehistory of Languages, Ed. by S.M. Lamb & E. D. Mitchell., pp. 178–199. Stanford, California: Stanford University Press.
- SHEVOROSHKIN, V.V. 2003. "Salishan and North Caucasian." Mother Tongue 8: 39–64.
- SHEVOROSHKIN, V.V. 2004. "Proto-Salishan and Proto-North-Caucasian Consonants: a few cognate sets." in Nostratic Centennial Conference: the Pécs Papers, Ed. by. I. Hegedűs & P. Sidwell, pp. 181–191. Pécs: Lingua Franca Group.
- SHEVOROSHKIN, V.V. 2008. “Introduction to Milyan”. In: Mother Tongue XIII: 63–96.
- SHEVOROSHKIN, V.V. 2012. "Anatolian laryngeals in Milyan". In: The Sound of Indo-European: Phonetics, Phonemics, and Morphophonemics. Edited by Benedicte Nielsen Whitehead. Museum Tusculanum Press. pp. 456–483. ISBN 978-87-635-3838-1

== See also ==
- Moscow School of Comparative Linguistics
