= Carian language =

Ancient Indo-European language

Carian
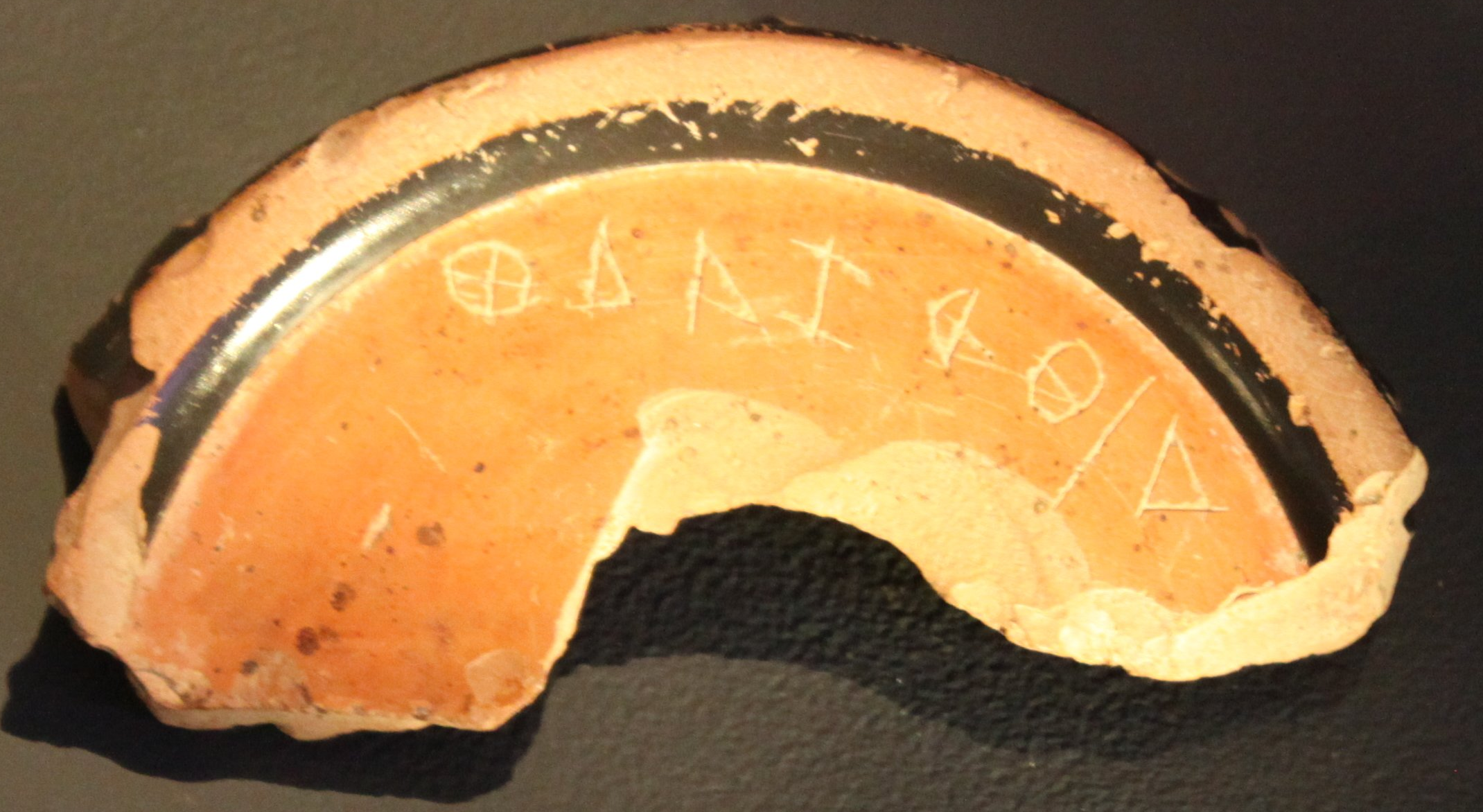
- Inscription in Carian of the name 𐊨𐊣𐊠𐊦𐊹𐊸, qlaλiś
- Region: Ancient southwestern Anatolia and the city of Memphis in Egypt
- Ethnicity: Carians
- Era: attested 7th–3rd century BCE
- Language family: Indo-European: Anatolian; Luwo-Lydian; Luwo-Palaic; Luwic; Lyco-Carian; Carian–Milyan; Carian
- Early forms: Proto-Indo-European: Proto-Anatolian
- Writing system: Carian alphabets

Language codes
- ISO 639-3: xcr
- Glottolog: cari1274

The Carian language is an extinct language of the Luwic subgroup of the Anatolian branch of the Indo-European language family, spoken by the Carians. The known corpus is small, and the majority comes from Egypt. Approximately 170 Carian inscriptions from Egypt are known, while only about 30 are known from Caria itself.

Caria is a region of western Anatolia between the ancient regions of Lycia and Lydia, a name possibly first mentioned in Hittite sources. Carian is closely related to Lycian and Milyan (Lycian B), and both are closely related to, though not direct descendants of, Luwian. Whether the correspondences between Luwian, Carian, and Lycian are due to direct descent (i.e. a language family as represented by a tree model), or are due to the effects of a sprachbund is disputed.

== Sources ==
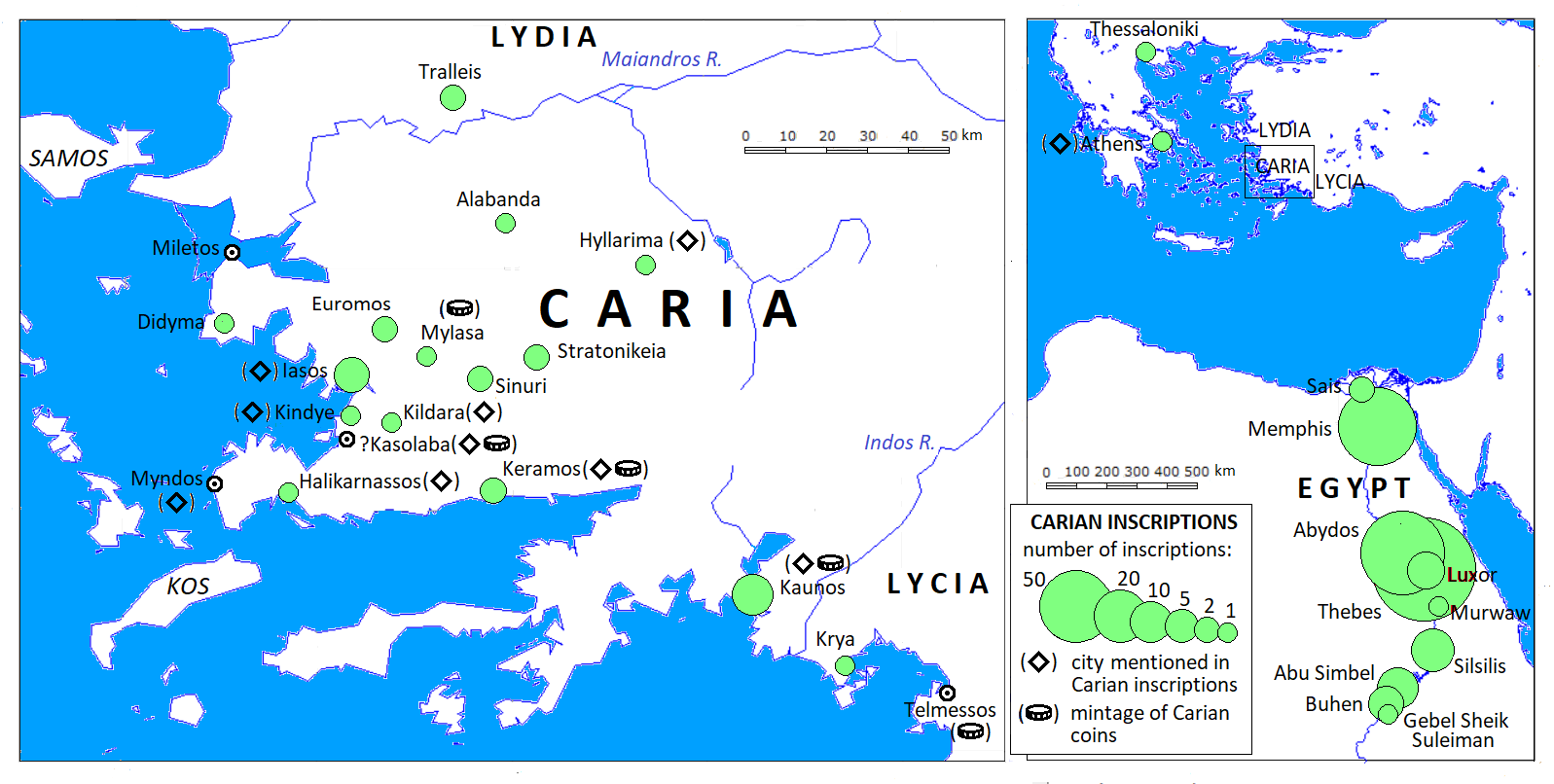
Map showing locations where Carian inscriptions have been found—in Caria proper, Mainland Greece, and Egypt.

Carian is known from these sources:

- Nearly 40 inscriptions from Caria, including five Carian-Greek bilinguals (however, for only two of them is the connection between the Carian and Greek text evident).
- Two inscriptions from mainland Greece: a bilingual from Athens and a graffito from Thessaloniki.
- 60 funeral inscriptions of the Caromemphites, an ethnic enclave at Memphis, Egypt, five of them bilingual (Carian-Egyptian); two inscriptions from Sais in the Nile delta are also bilingual.

(The Caromemphites were descendants of Carian mercenaries who in the first quarter of the sixth century BCE came to Egypt to fight in the Egyptian army, as told by Herodotus, Histories, II.152-154, 163-169.)

- 130 graffiti from Abydos, Thebes, Abu Simbel, and elsewhere in Egypt.
- Coin legends from Mylasa, Kasolaba, Kaunos, and elsewhere in Caria, and Telmessos in Lycia.
- Words stated to be Carian by ancient authors.
- Personal names with a suffix of -ασσις (-assis), -ωλλος (-ōllos), or -ωμος (-ōmos) in Greek records.

== Decipherment ==
Prior to the late 20th century, the language remained a total mystery, even though many characters of the script seemed to be from the Greek alphabet. Using Greek phonetic values of letters, investigators of the 19th and 20th centuries were unable to make headway and erroneously classified the language as non-Indo-European.

A breakthrough was reached in the 1980s, using bilingual funerary inscriptions (Carian-Egyptian) from Egypt (Memphis and Sais). By matching personal names in Carian characters with their counterparts in Egyptian hieroglyphs, John D. Ray, Diether Schürr, and Ignacio J. Adiego were able to unambiguously derive the phonetic value of most Carian signs. It turned out that not a single Carian consonant sign has the same phonetic value as signs of similar shape in the Greek alphabet. By 1993, the so-called "Ray-Schürr-Adiego System" was generally accepted, and its basic correctness was confirmed in 1996 when in Kaunos (Caria), a new Greek-Carian bilingual was discovered, where the Carian names nicely matched their Greek counterparts.

The language turned out to be Indo-European, its vocabulary and grammar closely related to the other Anatolian languages like Lycian, Milyan, or Lydian. A striking feature of Carian is the presence of large consonant clusters, due to a tendency not to write short vowels. Examples:

| sb | = 'and' | cf. Milyan sebe, 'and' |
| ted | = 'father' | cf. Lycian tedi-, Lydian taada-, 'father' |
| en | = 'mother' | cf. Lycian ẽni, Lydian ẽnaś, 'mother' |
| Ktmno, k̂tmño | (Carian personal name) | Greek Hekatomnos (cf. Hecatomnus of Mylasa) |
| Psmaśk, Pismaśk, Pismašk | (Egyptian personal name) | Psamtik (cf. Greek Psammetikhos I, II, III, IV) |
| Kbid-, Kbd- | (name of a Carian city) | cf. Lycian χbide (Greek Kaunos) |

== The Carian alphabet ==
The sound values of the Carian alphabetic signs are very different from those in the usual Greek alphabets. Only four vowels signs are the same as in Greek (A = α, H = η, O = ο, Y = υ/ου), but not a single consonant is the same. The reason for this might be that the Carians originally developed an alphabet consisting of consonants only (like the Phoenician and Hieroglyphic alphabets before them), and later added the vowel signs, borrowed from a Greek alphabet.

The Carian alphabet consisted of about 34 characters:

| transcription | a | b | β | d | δ | e | γ | i | j | k | k̂ | l | λ | Í | m | n | ñ | ŋ | o | p | q | r | s | ś | š | t | τ | u | w | y | ý | z | 18 | 39 |
|---|---|---|---|---|---|---|---|---|---|---|---|---|---|---|---|---|---|---|---|---|---|---|---|---|---|---|---|---|---|---|---|---|---|---|
| Carian sign | 𐊠 | Λ,𐊩 | 𐋊 | 𐊢,< | 𐊾 | 𐊺,𐋏 | 𐋀 | 𐊹 | 𐋅 | 𐊼,𐊽 | 𐊴,+ | 𐊣 | 𐊦 | 𐋃 | 𐊪 | 𐊵 | 𐊳 | 𐋄 | 𐊫 | 𐊷 | ʘ,𐊨 | ,𐊥 | 𐊰 | 𐊸 | 𐤧,𐤭 | 𐊭 | 𐋇 | 𐊲,V | 𐊿 | 𐊤,𐋈 | 𐊻 | 𐋂 | 𐊱 | 𐋆 |
| (rare variants) | | 𐊱? | 𐋋,𐋌, 𐋍,𐊡 | | | 𐊧 | 𐋁 | | 𐤴 | | | 𐋎? | 𐋏,𐋎 | 𐋉 | | | | | | | | | | | 𐊮,𐊯 | Ρ,𐊬 | 𐊶 | | | 𐋐 | | | | |
| IPA | /a/ | /β/ | /ᵐb/ | /ð/? | /ⁿd/ | /e/ | /ᵑkʷ/? | /i/ | /j/ | /k/ | /c/ | /l~r/ | /l:~d/ | /rʲ/? | /m/ | /n/ | /ɲ/ | /ᵑk/ | /o/ | /p/ | /kʷ/ | /r/ | /s/ | /ç/ | /ʃ/ | /t/ | /tʃ/ | /u/ | /w/ | /y/ | /ɥ/ | /ts/ | ? | ? |
| interchangeable? | a←e | | | | | e→a | | j→i | | | | ℓ-variants | | | | | | | | | | | | | | | | w→u | | ý→y | | | | |

In Caria inscriptions are usually written from left to right, but most texts from Egypt are written right-to-left; in the latter case each character is written mirrorwise. Some, mostly short, inscriptions have word dividers: vertical strokes, dots, spaces or linefeeds.

== Phonology ==
=== Consonants ===
In the chart below, the Carian letter is given, followed by the transcription. Where the transcription differs from IPA, the phonetic value is given in brackets. Many Carian phonemes were represented by multiple letter forms in various locations. The Egypto-Carian dialect seems to have preserved semivowels w, j, and ý lost or left unwritten in other varieties. Two Carian letters have unknown phonetic values: 𐊱 and 𐋆. The letter 𐊶 τ_{2} may have been equivalent to 𐋇 τ.

| | Bilabial | Alveolar | Postalveolar | Palatal | Velar | Labiovelar |
|---|---|---|---|---|---|---|
| Plosive | 𐊷 p | 𐊭 t | | 𐊴, 𐊛 k̂ [c] | 𐊼,𐊽 k | 𐊨 q [kʷ] |
| Prenasalized | 𐋌 β [ᵐb] | 𐊾 δ [ⁿd] | | | 𐋄 ŋ [ⁿg]? | 𐋀,𐋁 γ [ⁿgʷ]? |
| Nasal | 𐊪 m | 𐊵, 𐊜 n 𐊳 ñ [n̩, n̚] | | | | |
| Fricative | 𐊬, Λ b [β~ɸ] | 𐊢 d [ð~θ] 𐊰 s | 𐊮,𐊯,𐤭 š [ʃ] | 𐊸 ś [ç] | | |
| Affricate | | 𐋂 z [t͡s] | 𐋇 τ [t͡ʃ] 𐊶 τ_{2} [t͡ʃ]? | | | |
| Trill | | 𐊥 r | | | | |
| Lateral | | 𐊣, 𐋎, 𐋃 l 𐊦, 𐊣 λ [lː, ld] 𐋃, 𐋉 ĺ [l]? | | | | |
| Approximant | 𐊿 w^{†} | | | 𐋅 j^{†} | 𐊻,𐋈,𐋐 ý [ɥ]^{†} | |

^{†} Phonemes attested in Egypto-Carian only.

==== Lateral sounds ====
Across the various sites where inscriptions have been found, the two lateral phonemes /l/ and /λ/ contrast but may be represented by different letters of the Carian script 𐊣/𐋎, 𐊦, and 𐋃/𐋉 depending on the location. The letter 𐋉 (formerly transcribed <ŕ>) is now seen as an Egyptian variant of 𐋃 <ĺ>.

=== Vowels ===
In the chart below, the Carian letter for each vowel is followed by the conventional transcription with the Greek equivalent in parentheses. An epenthetic schwa to break up clusters may have been unwritten.

| | Front | | Central | Back |
| | -R | +R | Central | Back |
|---|---|---|---|---|
| Close | 𐊹; i (ι) | 𐊤; y (υ) | | 𐊲; u (ου) |
| Open-mid | 𐊺, 𐋏; e (η) | | [ə] | 𐊫; o (ω) |
| Open | | | 𐊠; a (α) | |

== Grammar ==
=== Morphology ===
==== Nominal declension ====
Carian nouns are inflected for at least three cases: nominative, accusative, and genitive. The dative case is assumed to be present also, based on related Anatolian languages and the frequency of dedicatory inscriptions, but its form is quite unclear. All Anatolian languages also distinguish between animate and inanimate noun genders.

| case | Singular | | Plural | |
| case | animate | inanimate | animate | inanimate |
|---|---|---|---|---|
| Nominative | -Ø | -Ø (-n?) | -š (?) | -Ø (?) |
| Accusative | -n | -Ø (-n?) | -š | -Ø (?) |
| Genitive / Possessive | -ś, -s(?) | | -τ (??) | |
| Dative | -s(?), -Ø(?), -e(?), -o(?), -i(?) | | -τ (?) | |
| Locative | -o (?), -δ (??) | | | |
| Ablative / Instrumental | -δ (?) | | | |

Features that help identify the language as Anatolian include the asigmatic nominative (without the Indo-European nominative ending *-s) but -s for a genitive ending: 𐊿𐊸𐊫𐊦 wśoλ, 𐊿𐊸𐊫𐊦𐊰 wśoλ-s. The similarity of the basic vocabulary to other Anatolian languages also confirms this e.g. 𐊭𐊺𐊢 ted "father"; 𐊺𐊵 en "mother". A variety of dative singular endings have been proposed, including zero-marked and -i/-e suffixation. No inanimate stem has been securely identified but the suffix -n may be reconstructed based on the inherited pattern. Alternatively, a zero ending may be derived from the historical *-od. The ablative (or locative?) case is suspected in one phrase (𐊠𐊣𐊫𐊰𐊾 𐊴𐊠𐊥𐊵𐊫𐊰𐊾 alosδ k̂arnosδ "from/in Halicarnassus(?)"), perhaps originally a clitic derived from the preverb δ "in, into" < PIE *endo.

==== Pronouns ====
Of the demonstrative pronouns s(a)- and a-, 'this', the nominative and accusative are probably attested:

| | s(a)- | | a- | |
| | Singular | | Singular | |
| | animate | inanimate | animate | inanimate |
|---|---|---|---|---|
| Nominative | sa | san | an (?) | ann (?) |
| Accusative | snn | san | an (?) | ann (?) |

The relative pronoun k̂j, k̂i, originally 'who, that, which', has in Carian usually developed into a particle introducing complements. Example:

iturowś / kbjomś / k̂i en / mw[d]onś k̂i
[This is the stele] of Ithoros (Egyptian woman's name, genitive), who [is] the mother (en, nominative) of Kebiomos (genitive), who is 'Myndonian'(?) (inhabitant of the Carian city of Myndos: ethnonym, genitive).

==== The verb ====
No undisputable verbal forms have yet been discovered in Carian. If verbal conjugation in Carian resembles the other Anatolian languages, one would expect 3rd person singular or plural forms, in both present and preterite, to end in -t or -d, or a similar sound. A few candidates have been proposed: ýbt, 'he offered', not 'he brings/brought', ait, 'they made', but these are not well established.

In a Carian-Greek bilingual from Kaunos, the first two words in Carian are kbidn uiomλn, corresponding to Greek ἔδοξε Καυνίοις, 'Kaunos decided' (literally: 'it seemed right to the Kaunians'). The first word, kbidn, is Carian for 'Kaunos' (or, 'the Kaunians'), so one would expect the second word, uiomλn, to be the verbal form, 'they decided'. Several more words ending in a nasal are suspected to be verbal forms, for example, mδane, mlane, mλn (cf. uio-mλn), 'they vowed, offered (?)', pisñ, 'they gave (?)'. However, to make such nasal endings fit in with the usual Anatolian verb paradigm (with 3rd person plural preterite endings in -(n)t/-(n)d, from *-onto), one would have to assume a non-trivial evolution in Carian from *-onto into -n, -ñ (and possibly -ne?).

=== Syntax ===
Virtually nothing is known of Carian syntax. This is chiefly due to two factors: first, uncertainty as to which words are verbs; second, the longer Carian inscriptions hardly show word dividers. Both factors seriously hamper the analysis of longer Carian texts.

The only texts for which the structure is well understood are funeral inscriptions from Egypt. Their nucleus is the name of the deceased. Personal names in Carian were usually written as "A, [son] of B" (where B is in the genitive, formally recognizable from its genitival ending -ś). For example:

psmaśk iβrsiś

= Psammetikhos [the son] of Imbarsis [was here] (graffito from Buhen)

In funeral inscriptions the father's name is often accompanied by the relative pronoun k̂i, "who, who is":

irow | pikraś k̂i

= [Here lies] Irōw [Egyptian name] who is [the son] of Pigres [Anatolian name] (first part of a funeral inscription from Memphis)

The formula may then be extended by a substantive like 'grave', 'stele', 'monument'; by the name of the grandfather ("A, [son] of B, [son] of C"); other familial relations ("mother of ..., son of ...", etc.); profession ("astrologer, interpreter"); or ethnicity or city of origin. Example:

arjomś ue, mwsatś k̂i, mwdonś k̂i, tbridbδś k̂i

= stele (ue) of Arjom, who is [the son] of Mwsat, who is a Myndonian (born at the city of Myndos), who is [the son] of Tbridbδ (inscription on a funeral stele from Memphis)

== Examples ==
Carian glosses attested in Stephanus of Byzantium and Eustathius
| Greek | Transliterated | Translation |
|---|---|---|
| ἄλα | ala | horse |
| βάνδα | banda | victory |
| γέλα | gela | king |
| γίσσα | gissa | stone |
| κόον | koon | sheep |
| σοῦα(ν) | soua(n) | tomb |

Examples of Carian names in Greek
| Greek | Transliterated | Carian |
|---|---|---|
| Ἑκατόμνω "Hecatomnid" | Hekatomnō (gen. patronymic) | 𐊴𐊭𐊪𐊳𐊫𐊸 K̂tmñoś |
| Καύνιος | Kaunios | 𐊼𐊬𐊢𐊿𐊵 Kbdwn |
| Καῦνος | Kaunos | 𐊼𐊬𐊹𐊢 Kbid |
| Πιγρης | Pigrēs | 𐊷𐊹𐊼𐊥𐊺 Pikre |
| Πονυσσωλλος | Ponussōllos | 𐊷𐊵𐊲𐊸𐊫𐊦 Pnuśoλ |
| Σαρυσσωλλος | Sarussōllos | 𐊮𐊠𐊥𐊲𐊸𐊫𐊦 Šaruśoλ |
| Υλιατος | Uliatos | 𐊿𐊣𐊹𐊠𐊭 Wliat |

Examples of Greek names in Carian
| Greek | Transliterated | Carian |
|---|---|---|
| Λυσικλέους (genitive) | Lysikleous | 𐊣𐊿𐊰𐊹𐊼𐊣𐊠𐊰 Lùsiklas |
| Λυσικράτους (genitive) | Lysikratous | 𐊣𐊿𐊰𐊹𐊼𐊥𐊠𐊭𐊠𐊰 Lùsikratas |
| Ἀθηναῖον (accusative) | Athēnaion | 𐊫𐊭𐊫𐊵𐊫𐊰𐊵 Otonosn |
| Φίλιππος (nominative) | Philippos | 𐊷𐊹𐋃𐊹𐊷𐊲𐊰 Pilipus |

The Athenian Bilingual Inscription

Σε̂μα τόδε : Τυρ[ Greek: Sema tode Tyr — "This is the tomb of Tur...,"
Καρὸς τô Σκύλ[ακος] Greek: Karos to Skylakos — "the Carian, the son of Scylax" ()
𐊸𐋅𐊠𐊰 : 𐊰𐊠𐊵 𐊭𐊲𐊥[ Carian: Śjas: san Tur[ "This is the tomb of Tur..."
[Ἀ]ριστοκλε̂ς ἐπ[οίε̄] Greek: Aristokles epoie — "Made by Aristocles."

The word 𐊰𐊠𐊵 san is equivalent to τόδε and evidences the Anatolian language assibilation, parallel to Luwian za-, "this". If 𐊸𐋅𐊠𐊰 śjas is not exactly the same as Σε̂μα Sēma it is roughly equivalent.

== Language history ==
The Achaean Greeks, arriving in small numbers on the coasts of Anatolia in the Late Bronze Age, found them occupied by a population that did not speak Greek and were generally involved in political relationships with the Hittite Empire. After the fall of the latter, the region became the target of heavy immigration by Ionian and Dorian Greeks who enhanced Greek settlements and founded or refounded major cities. They assumed, for purposes of collaboration, new regional names based on their previous locations: Ionia, Doris.

The writers born in these new cities reported that the people among whom they had settled were called Carians and spoke a language that was "barbarian," "barbaric," or "barbarian-sounding" (i.e., not Greek). No clue has survived from these writings as to what exactly the Greeks might mean by "barbarian". The reportedly Carian names of the Carian cities did not and do not appear to be Greek. Such names as Andanus, Myndus, Bybassia, Larymna, Chysaoris, Alabanda, Plarasa, and Iassus were puzzling to the Greeks, some of whom attempted to give etymologies in words they said were Carian. For the most part, they remain a mystery.

Writing disappeared in the Greek Dark Ages, but no earlier Carian writing has survived. When inscriptions, some bilingual, began to appear in the 7th century BCE, it was already some hundreds of years after the city-naming phase. The earlier Carian may not have been exactly the same.

The local development of Carian excludes theories: it was not widespread in the Aegean, it is not related to Etruscan, was not written in any ancient Aegean scripts, and was not a substrate Aegean language. Its occurrence in various places of Classical Greece is due only to the travel habits of Carians, who apparently became co-travellers of the Ionians. The Carian cemetery of Delos probably represents the pirates mentioned in classical texts. The Carians who fought for Troy (if they did) were not classical Carians any more than the Greeks there were classical Greeks.

Being overrun by larger numbers of Greeks and under the domination from time to time of the Ionian League, Caria eventually Hellenized, and the Carian language became extinct. The interludes under the Persian Empire perhaps served only to delay the process. Hellenization would lead to the extinction of the Carian language in the 1st century BCE or early in the Common Era.

== See also ==
- Carian alphabets

== Sources ==
- Adiego, Ignacio-Javier. Studia Carica. Barcelona, 1993.
- Adiego, I.J. The Carian Language. With an appendix by Koray Konuk, Leiden: Brill, 2007.
- Adiego, Ignasi-Xavier. "Carian identity and Carian language". In: 4th Century Karia. Defining a Karian identity under the Hekatomnids. Istanbul: Institut Français d'Études Anatoliennes-Georges Dumézil, 2013. pp. 15–20. (Varia Anatolica, 28) [www.persee.fr/doc/anatv_1013-9559_2013_ant_28_1_1280]
- Blümel, W., Frei, P., et al., ed., Colloquium Caricum = Kadmos 38 (1998).
- Giannotta, M.E., Gusmani, R., et al., ed., La decifrazione del Cario. Rome. 1994.
- Ray, John D., An approach to the Carian script, Kadmos 20:150-162 (1981).
- Ray, John D., An outline of Carian grammar, Kadmos 29:54-73 (1990).
- Melchert, H. Craig. 2004. Carian in Roger D. Woodard, ed., The Cambridge Encyclopedia of the World's Ancient Languages. Cambridge: Cambridge University Press. pp. 609–613.
- Откупщиков, Ю. В. "Догреческий субстрат. У истоков европейской цивилизации" (Otkupschikov, Yu. V. "Pre-Greek substrate. At the beginnings of the European civilization"). Leningrad, 263 pp. (1988).
- THOMAS W. KOWALSKI (1975), LETTRES CARIENNES: ESSAI DE DECHIFFREMENT DE L’ECRITURE CARIENNE Kadmos. Volume 14, Issue 1, Pages 73–93, DOI 10.1515/kadm.1975.14.1.73
