= Andrey Korolev =

Russian linguist (1942–1999)

- Андрей Королёв
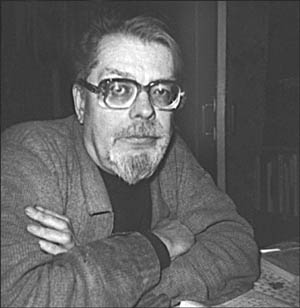
- Andrey Korolev
- Born: 7 July 1944; Bern, Switzerland
- Died: 16 July 1999 (aged 55); Moscow, Russia
- Education: Moscow State University
- Scientific career
- Fields: Linguistics; Celtic studies; historical linguistics; Indo-European studies
- Institutions: RAN Institute of Linguistics
- Academic advisors: Vitaly Shevoroshkin; Viktoria Yartseva
- Notable students: Aleksey Kasyan

Andrey Aleksandrovich Korolev (Russian: Андрей Александрович Королёв; 7 July 1944 – 16 July 1999) was a Soviet and Russian philologist, PhD, a scholar in Indo-European and Oriental studies. His main works concerned Celtic and Hittite and other languages of Asia Minor.

Born in a diplomatic family, he was a fluent speaker of English and German since he was a child. He worked at the department of Germanic and Celtic languages of the Institute of Linguistics (Russian Academy of Sciences) and taught at the Russian State University for the Humanities. Through his great learning and talent for languages he became one of the first Russian scholars in two particularly difficult disciplines of Indo-European studies, dedicating himself to the Celtic and ancient languages of Asia Minor. He was also an expert in the broader questions of Indo-European linguistics and culture. His best known books are “Drevnejšie pamjatniki irlandskogo jazyka” (Древнейшие памятники ирландского языка, The oldest monuments of the Irish language) (Moscow, 1984, 2nd ed. 2003), containing the full corpus of the Ogham inscriptions, known at that time, and “Vvedenie v keltologiju” (Введение в кельтлогию, Introduction to Celtic studies (in collaboration with Viktor Kalygin)) (Moscow 1989; 2nd ed. 2006).

Despite his position and the limited number of publications, in some scholars’ opinion, Korolev was one of the best experts in Indo-European linguistics not only in Russia, but also in the world.

== Publications ==
- Королёв А. А. История форм множественного числа имен существительных в ирландском языке. Автореф. дисс. ... к.филол.н. М., Ин-т языкознания. 1973. 20 с.
- Королёв А. А. Хетто-лувийские языки // Языки Азии и Африки. Кн. 1. М., 1976.
- Королёв А. А. Новые данные о венетском языке // Славянское и балканское языкознание. Вып. 3. М., 1977
- Королёв А. А. Древнейшие памятники ирландского языка. М., Наука. 1984. 209 стр. 850 экз. 2-е изд. М., УРСС. 2003. ISBN 5-354-00052-1
- Королёв А. А. Филологические методы в исследовании истории кельтских языков // Сравнительно-историческое изучение языков разных семей. М., 1988. С. 119-138
- Калыгин В. П., Королев А. А. Введение в кельтскую филологию. М., Наука. 1989. 251 с. 900 экз. 2-е изд. М., КомКнига. 2006. 272 с. ISBN 5-484-00265-6
- Korolev A. A.. Hittite Texts: New Readings, Joins, and Duplicates // Studia Linguarum 2 / Изд. А. Касьян, Ф. Минлос. М., 1999 [2000]. P. 281—290 ISBN 5-7281-0026-0
- Kassian A., Korolev A., Sidel’tsev A. Hittite Funerary Ritual šalliš waštaiš. Muenster, 2002 ISBN 3-934628-16-8

== Sources ==
- Дыбо А. В. Дыбо В. А., Касьян А. С. А. А. Королёв // Вопросы языкознания. № 6, 1999. С. 156—157.
- Studia Linguarum. Vol. 3 (fsc. 1—2). Memoriae A.A. Korolev dicata / Ed. by A. S. Kassian, A. V. Sidel’tsev. Moscow: Languages of Slavonic Culture, 2002. ISBN 5-94457-072-5
- Mac Mathúna S. The History of Celtic Scholarship in Russia and the Soviet Union // Parallels between Celtic and Slavic: Proceedings of the First International Colloquium of Societas Celto-Slavica held at the University of Ulster, Coleraine, 19–21 June 2005 / Ed. by S. Mac Mathúna, M. Fomin. Coleraine, 2006. P. 11-13.
