= Xanthian Obelisk =

Ancient Lycian inscription in Anatolia

Coordinates: 36°21′26″N 29°19′07″E

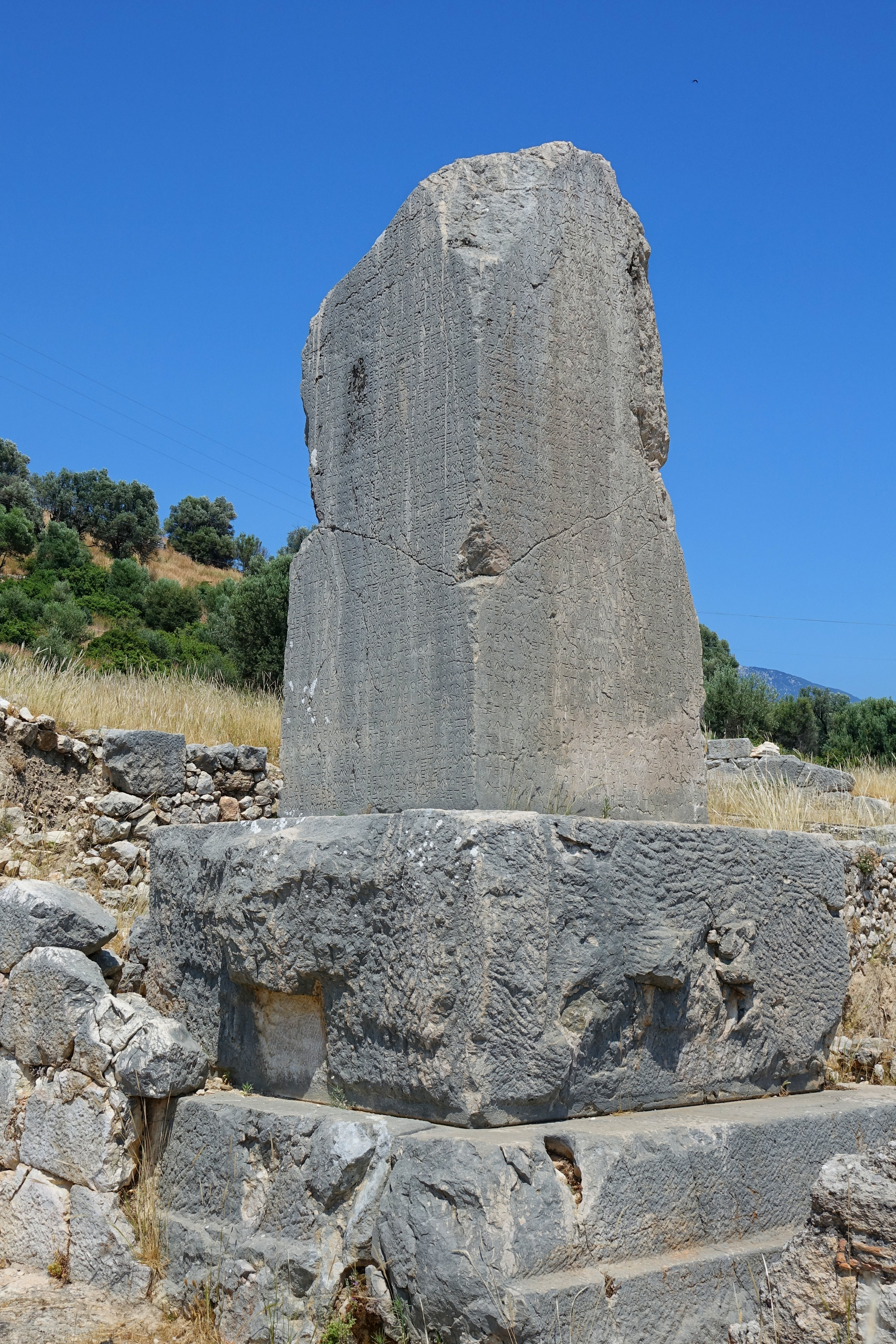
South and west face of the obelisk

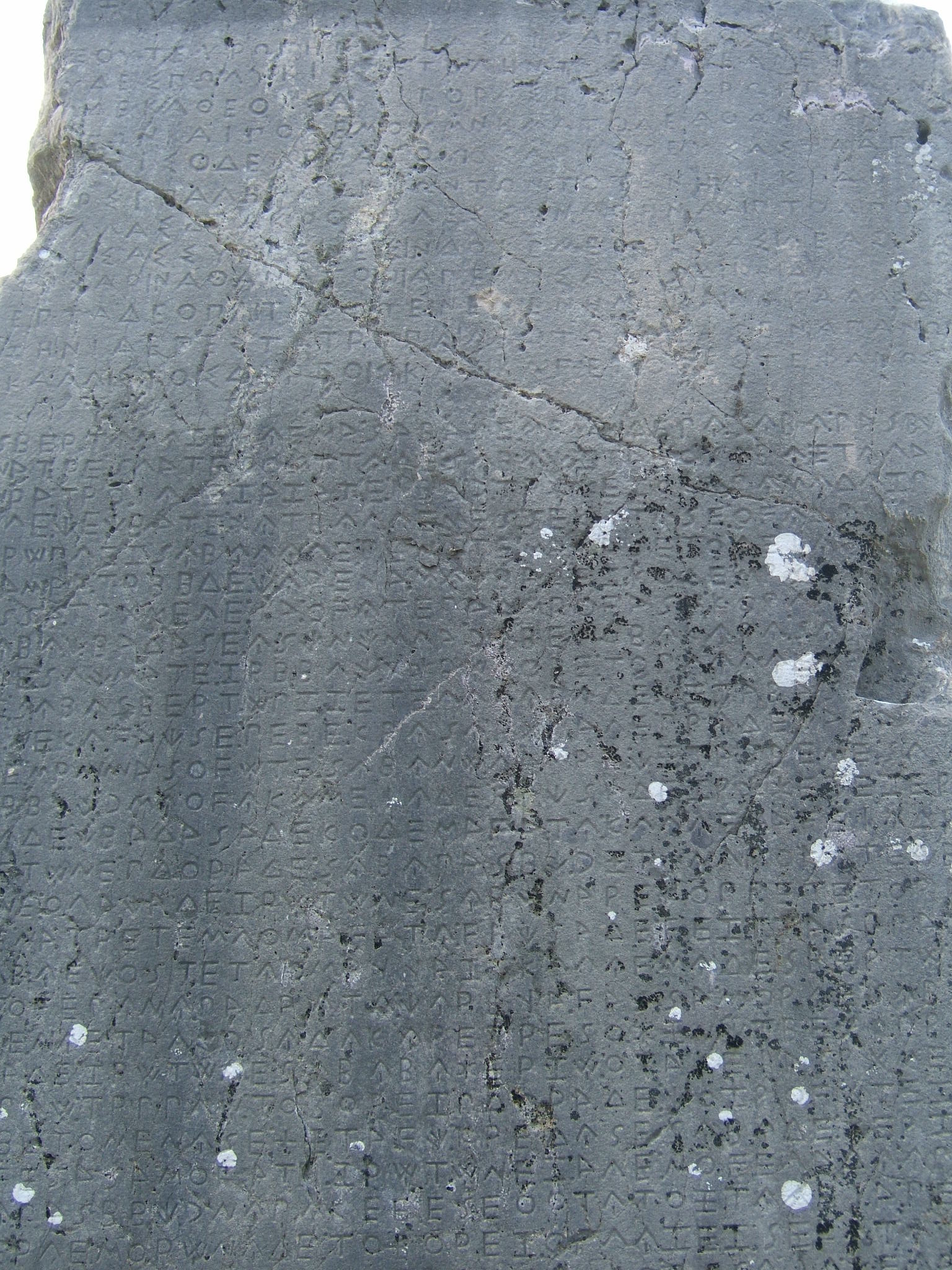
North face of the obelisk, with the Greek verse at the top (on slightly cleaner stone).

The Xanthian Obelisk, also known as the Xanthos or Xanthus Stele, the Xanthos or Xanthus Bilingual, the Inscribed Pillar of Xanthos or Xanthus, the Harpagus Stele, the Pillar of Kherei and the Columna Xanthiaca, is a stele bearing an inscription currently believed to be trilingual, found on the acropolis of the ancient Lycian city of Xanthos, or Xanthus, near the modern town of Kınık in southern Turkey. It was created when Lycia was part of the Persian Achaemenid Empire, and dates in all likelihood to c. 400 BC. The pillar is seemingly a funerary marker of a dynastic satrap of Achaemenid Lycia. The dynast in question is mentioned on the stele, but his name had been mostly defaced in the several places where he is mentioned: he could be Kherei (Xerei) or more probably his predecessor Kheriga (Xeriga, Gergis in Greek).

The obelisk or pillar was originally topped by a tomb, most certainly belonging to Kheriga, in a way similar to the Harpy Tomb. The top most likely fell down during an earthquake in ancient times. The tomb was decorated with reliefs of his exploits, and with a statue of the dynast standing on top.

The three languages are Ancient Greek, Lycian and Milyan (the last two are Anatolian languages and were previously known as Lycian A and Lycian B respectively). During its early period of study, the Lycian either could not be understood, or was interpreted as two dialects of one language, hence the term, bilingual. Another trilingual from Xanthus, the Letoon trilingual, was subsequently named from its three languages, Greek, Lycian A and Aramaic. They are both four-sided, both trilingual. The find sites are different. The key, unequivocal words are bilingual, Letoon, Aramaic, Lycian B, Milyan. The equivocal words are stele, trilingual, Xanthus or Xanthos. "The Xanthus inscription" might refer to any inscription from Xanthus.

== Discovery ==
=== First investigation of Xanthus ===
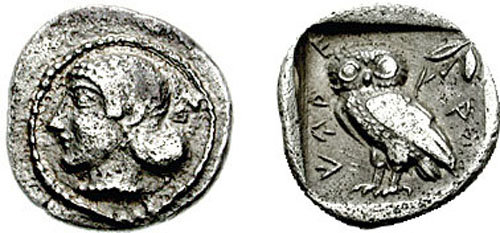
Coinage of dynast Kheriga (circa 450-410 BCE), probable owner of the tomb originally supported by the pillar.

The stele lay in plain sight for centuries, though the upper portion was broken off and toppled by an earthquake at some time in antiquity. While charting the Lycian coast, Francis Beaufort, then a captain in the Royal Navy, surveyed and reported on the ruins. Most of the ruins stood at elevated locations to which not even a mule trail remained. Reports of the white marble tombs, which were visible to travellers, attracted the interest of Victorian Age explorers, such as Charles Fellows.

On Saturday, April 14, 1838, Sir Charles Fellows, archaeologist, artist and mountaineer, member of the British Association and man of independent means, arrived in an Arab dhow from Constantinople at the port of Tékrova, site of ancient Phaselis. On Friday he had arrived in Constantinople from England to seek permission to explore. According to him he was bent on an Anatolian "excursion" around Lycia. Although his journal is in the first person, it is clear from the text that others were present, and that he had some equipment with him. He was known also to the British Museum and to the Royal Geographical Society, with whom he collaborated immediately on his return. The Ottoman Empire was on good terms with the British Empire, due to British support of the Ottomans during their defence against Napoleon. They granted permission and would cooperate in the subsequent removal of antiquities to the British Museum.

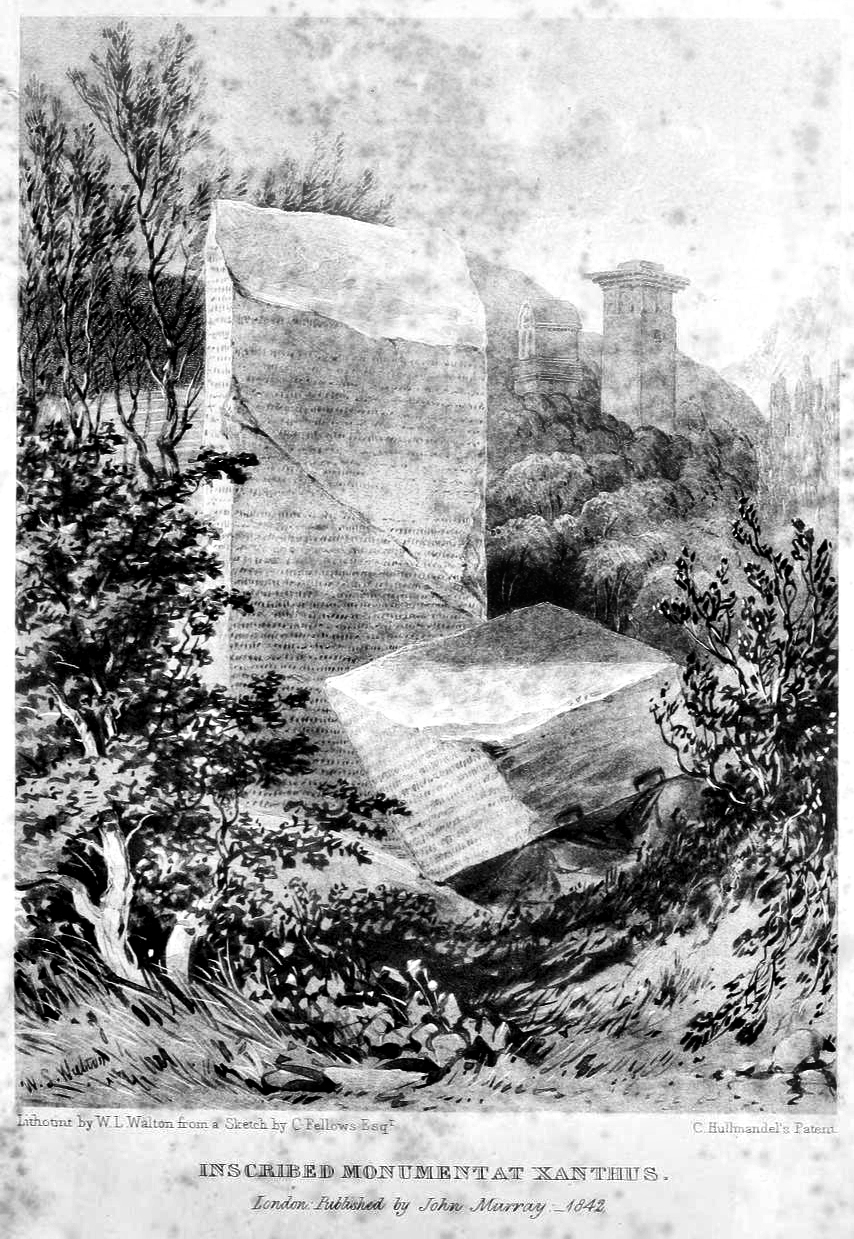
Xanthos Obelisk soon after discovery, in 1842. The complete tomb must have resembled the Harpy Tomb in the background.

Progress along the coast was so slow that Fellows disembarked at Kas, obtained some horses, and proceeded to cross Ak Dağ, perhaps influenced by his interest in mountaineering. Climbing thousands of feet, Fellows observed tombs and ruins over the entire slopes of the mountains. The party cut short its mountain climbing, scrambling down to Patera, to avoid being blown off the slopes by heavy prevailing winds. From Patera they rode up the banks of the Xanthus and, on April 19, camped among the tombs of the ruined city.

Fellows took note of the obelisk architecture and the many inscriptions in excellent condition, but he did not linger to examine them further. After making a preliminary survey, he returned to Britain to publish his first journal, and to request the Board of Trustees of the British Museum to ask Lord Palmerston (Foreign Secretary) to request a firman from the Ottoman Empire for the removal of antiquities. He also sought the collaboration of Colonel William Martin Leake, a noted antiquarian and traveller and, with others, including Beaufort, was a founding member of the Royal Geographical Society. While waiting for the firman, Fellows embarked for Lycia, arriving in Xanthus again in 1840.

=== Obelisk ===
On his return, armed with Beaufort's map, and Leake's directions, Fellows went in search for more Lycian cities, and found eleven more, accounting in all for 24 of Pliny's 36. He concentrated on coins and inscriptions. On April 17, he arrived again at Xanthus, writing: "Xanthus.— I am once more at my favourite city — ...." He noted that it was undespoiled; that is, the building stone had not been reused. He saw Cyclopean walls, gateways, paved roadways, trimmed stone blocks, and above all inscriptions, many in Greek, which he had no trouble reading and translating.

Fellows states that he had seen an obelisk on his previous trip, which, he said, he had mentioned in his first journal (if he did, it was not in the published version). Of the inscription, he said: "as the letters are beautifully cut, I have taken several impressions from them." His intent was to establish the forms of Lycian letters. He observed that "an earthquake has split off the upper part, which lies at the foot." As it weighed many tons, he could not move it. He excavated the obelisk from which it had been split, still standing, but embedded in the earth, and found that it stood on a pedestal. Of the lettering on it, he wrote: "The characters upon the northwest side, ... are cut in a finer and bolder style, and appear to be the most ancient." Seeing an inscription in Greek on the northeast side, he realised the importance of the find, but he did not say why, only that it was written in the first person, which "makes the monument itself speak."

=== Xanthian marbles ===
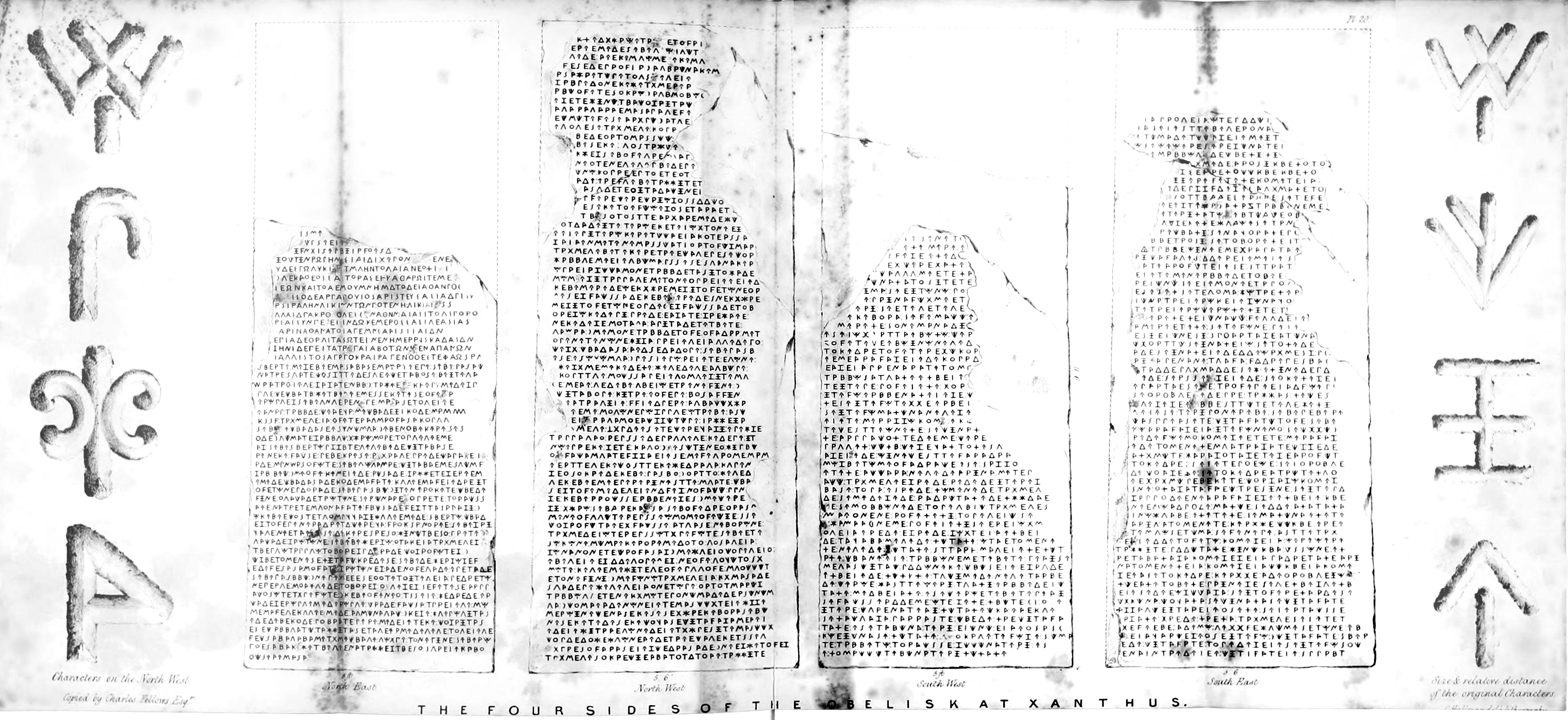
Text of the Obelisk at Xanthos. A more complete copy of all the fragments can be seen in The Xanthian Marbles.

In October, 1841, Fellows received word that the firman had been granted. The preliminary work was over, and events began to move rapidly. HMS Beacon, commanded by Captain Graves, had been reassigned to transport objects designated by Fellows, and Fellows was to board the ship in Malta. He wrote immediately to the British Museum offering to manage the expedition himself gratis, if he could receive free passage and rations on British naval vessels. The offer was accepted immediately and unconditionally. Once he boarded the ship unforeseen difficulties arose with the firman, and they found it necessary to voyage to Constantinople. There they received a firm commitment from the Sultan: "The Sublime Porte in interested in granting such demands, in consequence of the sincere friendship existing between the two governments." An additional problem was that the museum had allocated no funds for the expedition. Fellows offered to pay for it himself, to which no answer was received immediately.

At the mouth of the Xanthus, Captain Graves found no safe anchorage. Much to Fellows' chagrin, he was forced to anchor 50 miles away, but he left a flotilla of small boats under a lieutenant for the transport of the marbles. The flow of the Xanthus, according to Fellows, was greater than that of the Thames. The boats could make no headway in the strong currents, which Fellows estimated at 5 mph. Instead they pulled the boats upstream from the shore. The locals were exceedingly hospitable, supplying them with fresh edibles and pertinent advice, until they roasted a boar for dinner one night, after which they were despised for having eaten unclean meat. They reached Xanthus in December, 1841. Loading began in January.

On site they were limited as to what they could carry in small boats. The scene for the next few months was frenzied, with Fellows deciding ad hoc what was best to remove, rushing desperately to pry the objects from the earth, while the crews crated them. The largest objects were the Horse Tomb and parts of the Harpy Tomb, which they had to disassemble, cutting them up with saws. The obelisks were unthinkable. Fellows contented himself with taking paper casts of the inscriptions, which, sent to the museum in advance, were the subject of Leake's first analysis and publication. In all they crated 80 tons of material in 82 cases, which they transported downriver in March, 1842, for loading onto the ship temporarily moored for the purpose.

In Malta Fellows received a few pleasant surprises. The museum was going to pay for the expedition. Fellows was invited to stay on at the museum. The marbles became known as the Xanthian marbles.

== Inscriptions ==
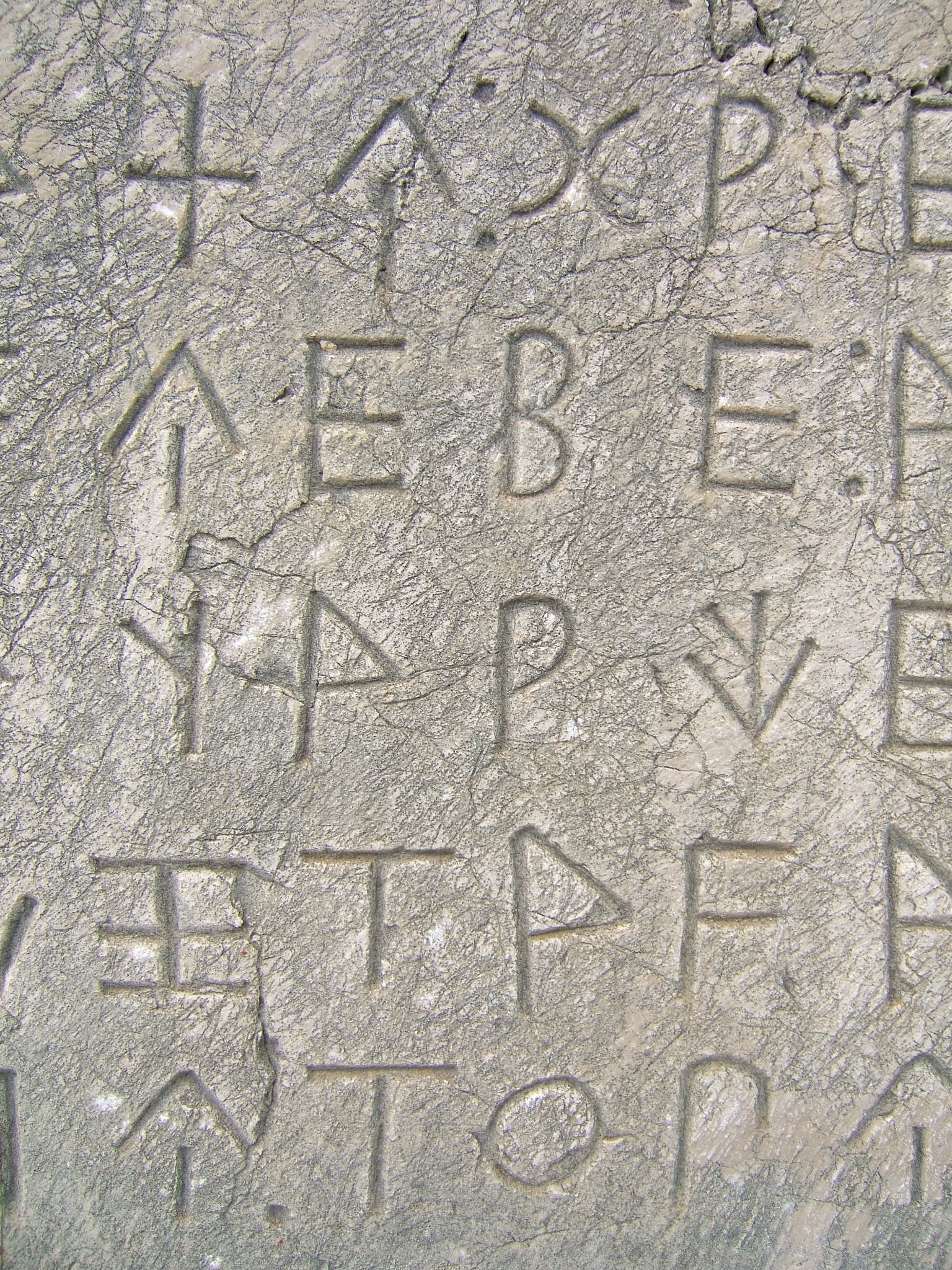
Lycian letters

The stele is an important archaeological find pertaining to the Lycian language. Similar to the Rosetta Stone, it has inscriptions both in Greek and in a previously mysterious language: Lycian, which, on further analysis, turned out to be two Luwian languages, Lycian and Milyan.

=== Referencing ===
Although not oriented on the cardinal directions, the stele presents four faces of continuous text that are traditionally described directionally, south, east, north and west, in that order, like the pages of a book. They are conventionally lettered a, b, c, and d. The whole book is inscription TAM I 44. The text of each page was inscribed in lines, conventionally numbered one through the number of the last line on the page. There are three pieces of text:

- a.1 through c.19. A historical section of 250 lines in Lycian describing the major events in which the deceased was involved.
- c.20 through c.31. A 12-line epigram in Greek in the style of Simonides of Ceos honoring the deceased.
- c.32 through d.71. A mythological poem written in the Lycian B dialect.

The pillar sits atop a tomb, and the inscription celebrates the deceased: a champion wrestler.

=== Language ===
In a section, Lycian Inscriptions, of Appendix B of his second journal, Fellows includes his transliterations of TAM I 44, with remarks and attempted interpretations. He admits to being able to do little with it; however, he does note, "some curious analogies might be shown in the pronouns of the other Indo-Germanic (Note: "Indo-Germanic" was the period's term for Indo-European. See Indo-European studies § History for more details.) languages". He had already decided, then, that the language was Indo-European. He had written this appendix from studies performed while he was waiting for the firman in 1840. The conclusions were not really his, however. He quotes a letter from his linguistic assistant, Daniel Sharpe, to whom he had sent copies, mentioning Grotefend's conclusion, based on five previously known inscriptions, that Lycian was Indo-European. By now he was referring to "the inscription on the obelisk at Xanthus." He had perceived that the deceased was mentioned as arppagooû tedēem, "son of Harpagos," from which the stele also became known as "the Harpagos stele." Fellows identified this Harpagus with the conqueror of Lycia and dated the obelisk to 500 BC on the historical Harpagus. His view has been called the Harpagid Theory by Antony Keen.
