= Kasolaba =

Town of ancient Caria

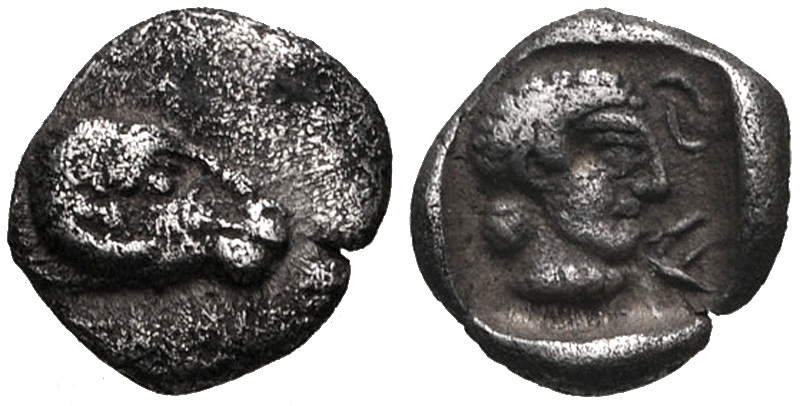
Hemiobol of Kasolaba struck in 450–400 BCE, depicting a ram's head on the obverse and an archaic-style male head beside Carian script (𐊠𐋃) within an incuse square in the reverse

Kasolaba or Casolaba (Ancient Greek: Κασωλάβα) was a town of ancient Caria. It was a member of the Delian League since it appears in tribute records of Athens between the years 454/3 and 447/6 BCE, paying a phoros of 2500 drachmae. A herald of the city is cited in a treaty between Mylasa and Cindye of the 4th century BCE. It also appears from this decree that the native population of Anatolia probably abounded in the city, and the city's membership in the Greek world is debatable.

It has been suggested that it should have been located near the coast north or northeast of Halicarnassus but its exact location is unknown. Suggested locations are Kemer, or Güvercinlik Tepesi, both a few miles south of the ancient city of Cindye.

== Coinage ==
Kasolaba issued various low-value denominations of silver coinage in the reduced Milesian standard present in where the city is theorized to be located. The city mainly struck hemiobols, but also struck lower denominations as well. The main designs present on their coinage are a ram's head on the obverse and a male head beside an ethnic in Carian script (written as 𐊠𐋃 or 𐊠𐋃𐊫) on the reverse, with different designs appearing later in the city's history.
