= Kheriga =

5th-century BC dynast of Lycia

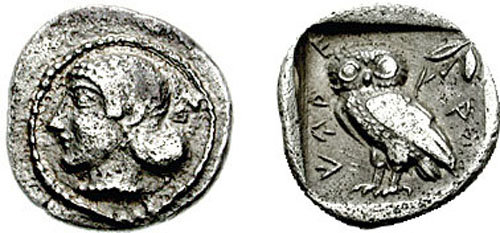
Coinage of Kheriga (circa 450–410 BCE).

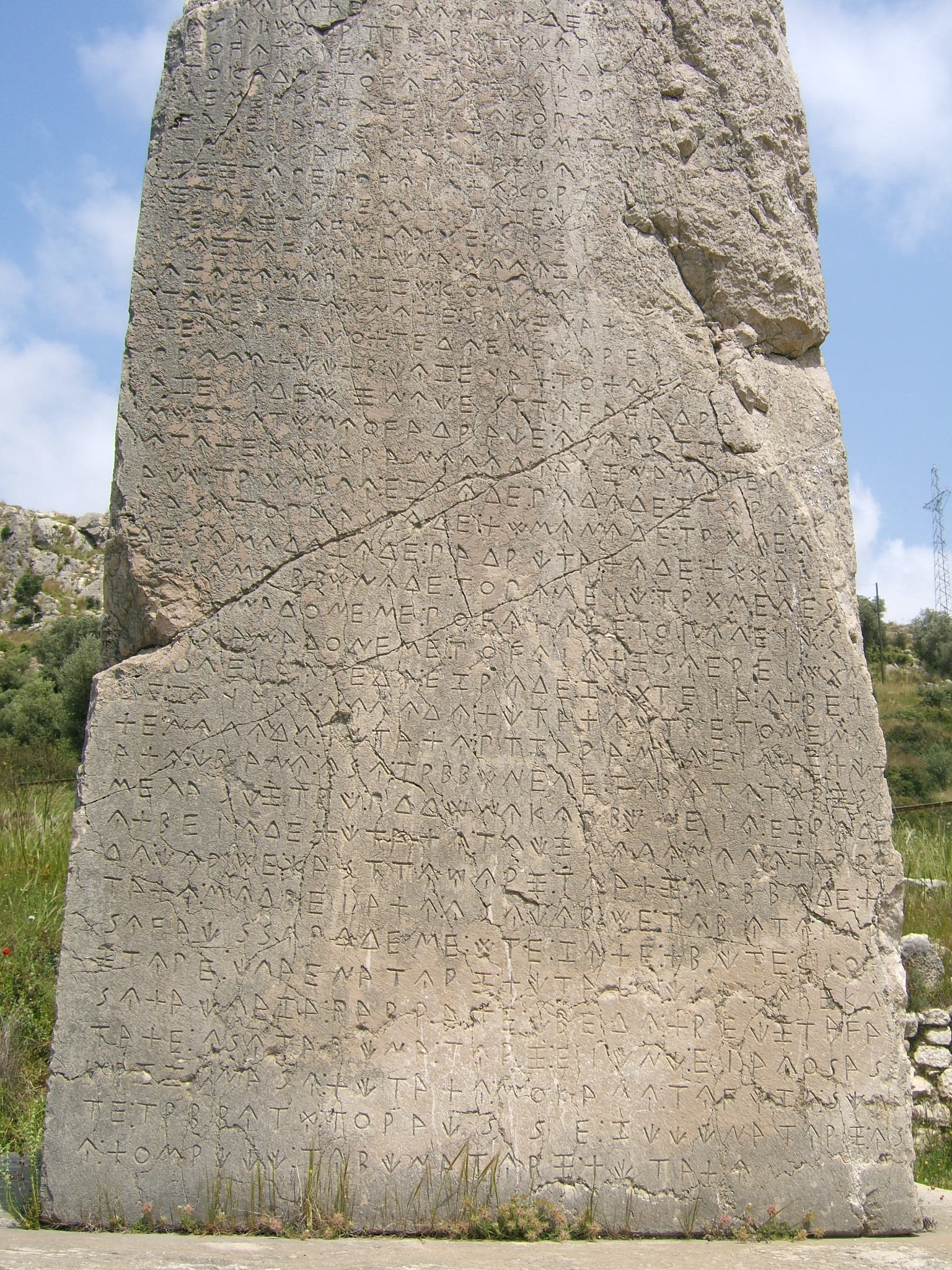
The Xanthian Obelisk was probably erected as a pillar supporting the sarcophagus of Kheriga, circa 400 BCE.

Kheriga (in Greek Gergis) was a Dynast of Lycia, who ruled circa 450-410 BCE. Kheriga is mentioned on the succession list of the Xanthian Obelisk, and is probably the owner of the sarcophagus that was standing on top of it.

Kheriga was son of Harpagus (Arppakhu in Lycian). Arbinas was the son of Kheriga.

Kheriga was ruler of Lycia at the time when Lycia was an ally of Athens in the Delian League. As the power of Athens weakened and Athens and Sparta fought the Peloponnesian Wars (431–404 BC), the majority of Lycian cities defaulted from the Delian League, with the exception of Telmessos and Phaselis. In 429 BC, Athens sent an expedition against Lycia to try to force it to rejoin the League. This failed when Lycia's leader Kheriga (Gergis) defeated Athenian general Melesander. The encounter is described in the inscription on the Xanthian Obelisk.
