= Lycian language =

Ancient Indo-European language

Lycian
- 𐊗𐊕𐊐𐊎𐊆𐊍𐊆 Trm̃mili
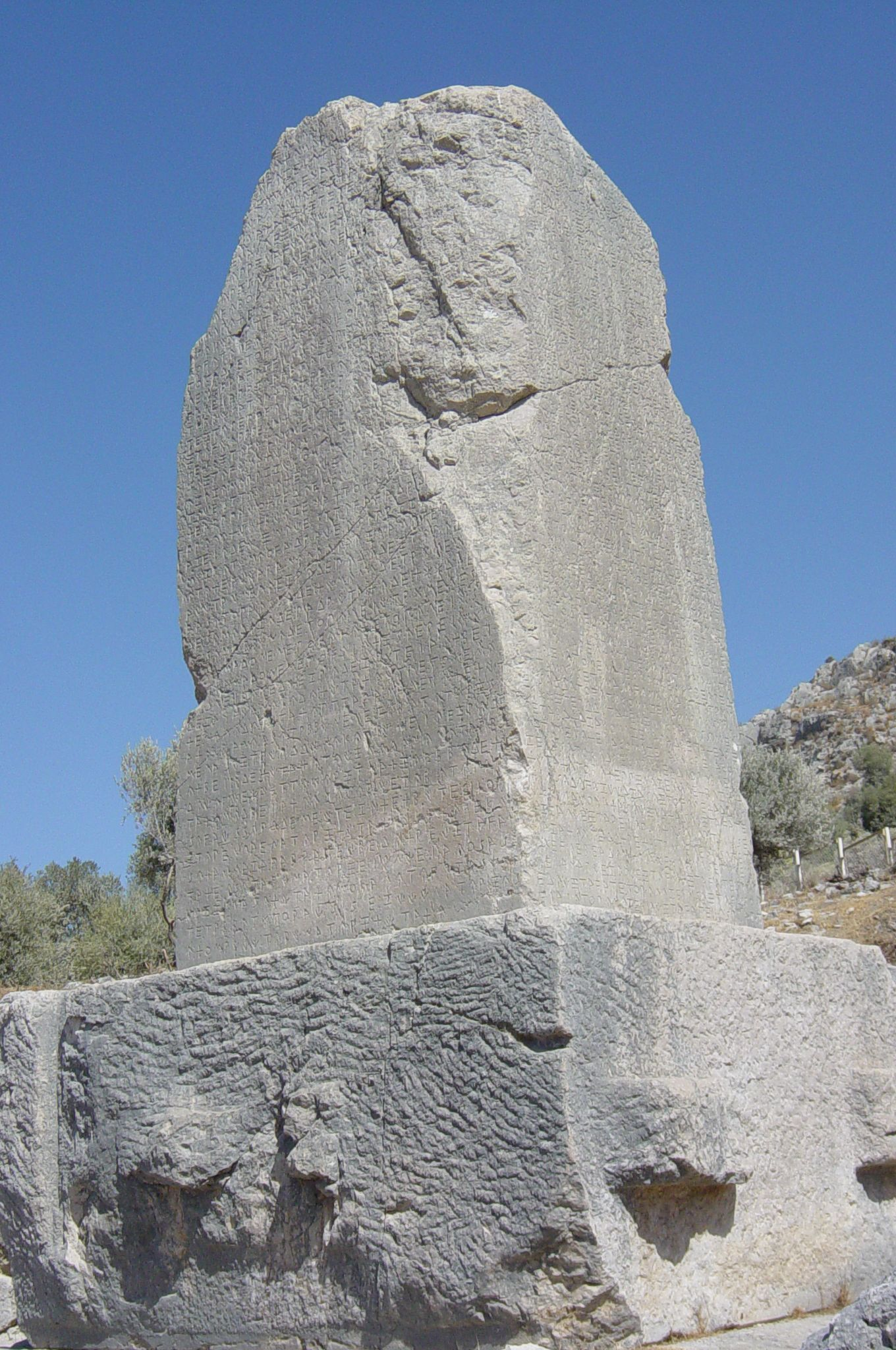
- Xanthos stele with Lycian inscriptions
- Native to: Lycia, Lycaonia
- Region: Southwestern Anatolia
- Ethnicity: Lycians
- Era: 500 – ca. 200 BC
- Language family: Indo-European: Anatolian; Luwo-Lydian; Luwo-Palaic; Luwic; Lyco-Carian; Lycian–Sidetic; Lycian
- Early forms: Proto-Indo-European: Proto-Anatolian
- Writing system: Lycian script

Language codes
- ISO 639-3: xlc
- Glottolog: lyci1241

The Lycian language (𐊗𐊕𐊐𐊎𐊆𐊍𐊆 Trm̃mili) was the language of the ancient Lycians who occupied the Anatolian region known during the Iron Age as Lycia. Most texts date back to the fifth and fourth century BC. Two languages are known as Lycian: regular Lycian or Lycian A, and Lycian B or Milyan. Lycian became extinct around the beginning of the first century BC, replaced by the Ancient Greek language during the Hellenization of Anatolia. Lycian had its own alphabet, which was closely related to the Greek alphabet but included at least one character borrowed from Carian as well as characters proper to the language. The words were often separated by two points.

== Area ==
Lycia covered the region lying between the modern cities of Antalya and Fethiye in southern Turkey, especially the mountainous headland between Fethiye Bay and the Gulf of Antalya. The Lukka, as they were referred to in ancient Egyptian sources, which mention them among the Sea Peoples, probably also inhabited the region called Lycaonia, located along the next headland to the east, also mountainous, between the modern cities of Antalya and Mersin.

== Discovery and decipherment ==
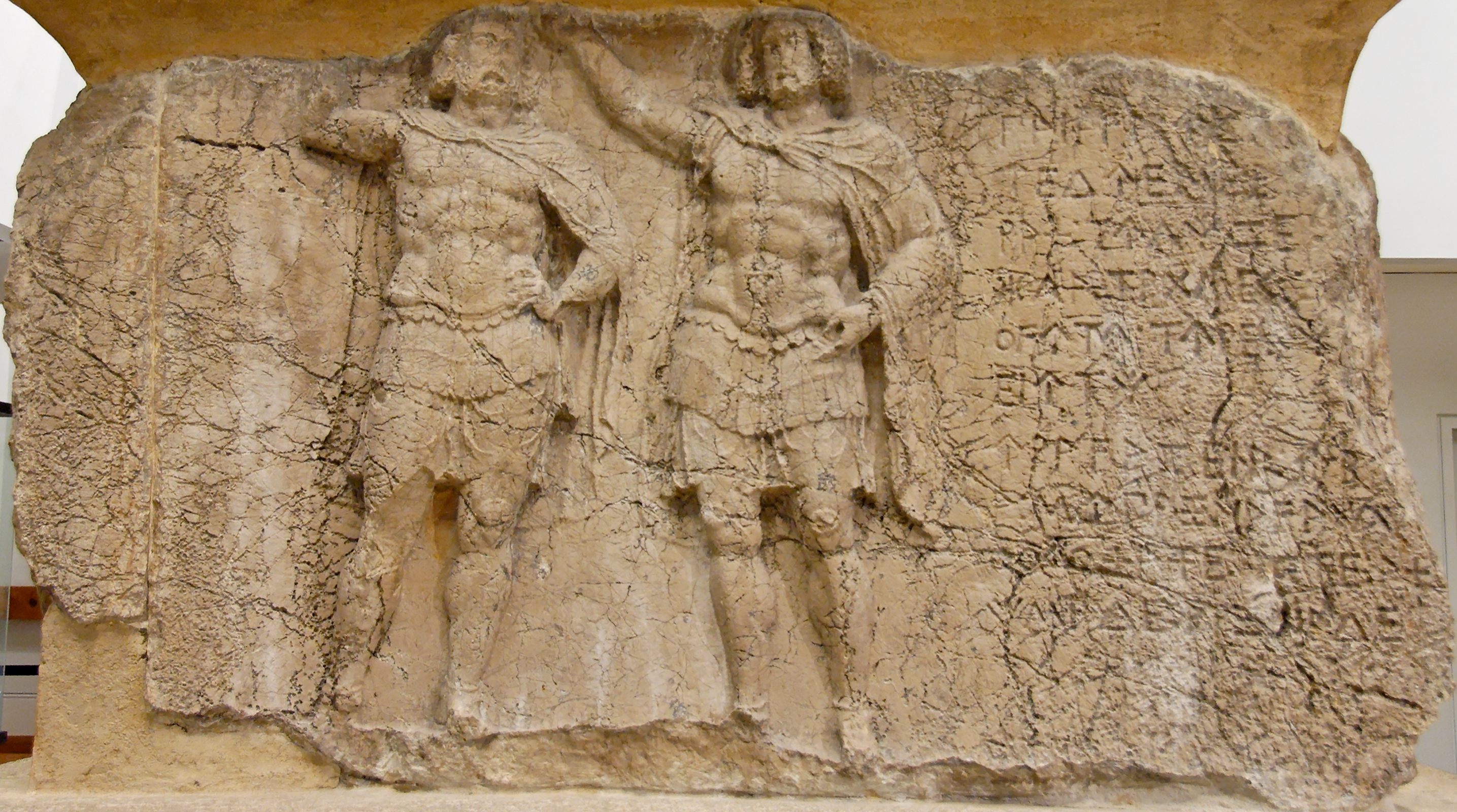
Payava (his name is Pamphylian) as depicted on his tomb. The Lycian inscription runs: “Payava, son of Ed[...], acquired [this grave] in the sacred [burial] area of the acropolis(?) of A[rttumba]ra (a Lycian ruler), when Lycia saw(?) S[alas](??) [as governor(?)]. This tomb I made, a 10 year [h]iti (project?), by means of Xanthian ahamas.” Payava may be the soldier at the right, honoring his ruler Arttumbara with a laurel wreath. 375-360 BC.

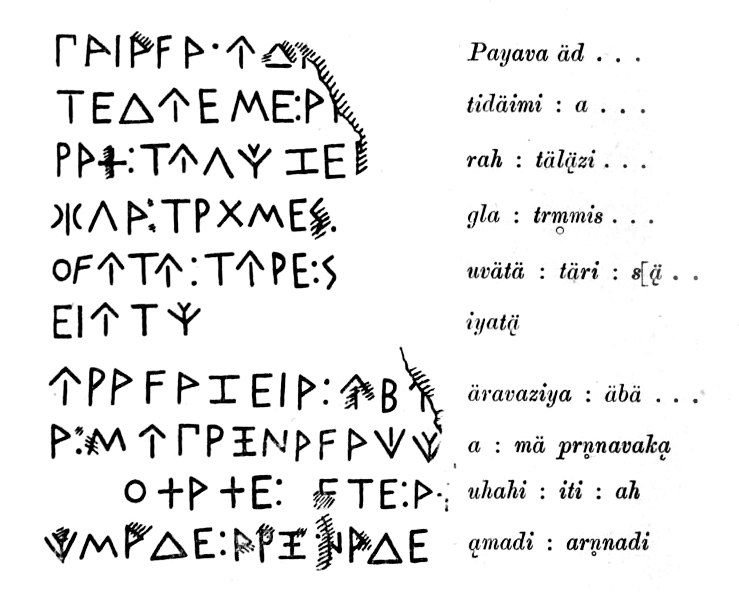
The inscription on the front of Payava's tomb in the Lycian language.

From the late eighteenth century Western European travellers began to visit Asia Minor to deepen their acquaintance with the worlds of Homer and the New Testament. In southwest Asia Minor (Lycia) they discovered inscriptions in an unknown script. The first four texts were published in 1820, and within months French Orientalist Antoine-Jean Saint-Martin used a bilingual showing individuals' names in Greek and Lycian as a key to transliterate the Lycian alphabet and determine the meaning of a few words. During the next century the number of texts increased, especially from the 1880s when Austrian expeditions systematically combed through the region. However, attempts to translate any but the most simple texts had to remain speculative, although combinatorial analysis of the texts cleared up some grammatical aspects of the language. The only substantial text with a Greek counterpart, the Xanthos stele, was hardly helpful because the Lycian text was quite heavily damaged, and worse, its Greek text does not anywhere come near to a close parallel.

It was only after the decipherment of Hittite, by Bedřich Hrozný in 1917, that a language became known that was closely related to Lycian and could help etymological interpretations of the Lycian vocabulary. A next leap forward could be made with the discovery in 1973 of the Letoon trilingual in Lycian, Greek and Aramaic. Though much remains unclear, comprehensive dictionaries of Lycian have been composed since by Craig Melchert and Günter Neumann.

== Sources ==
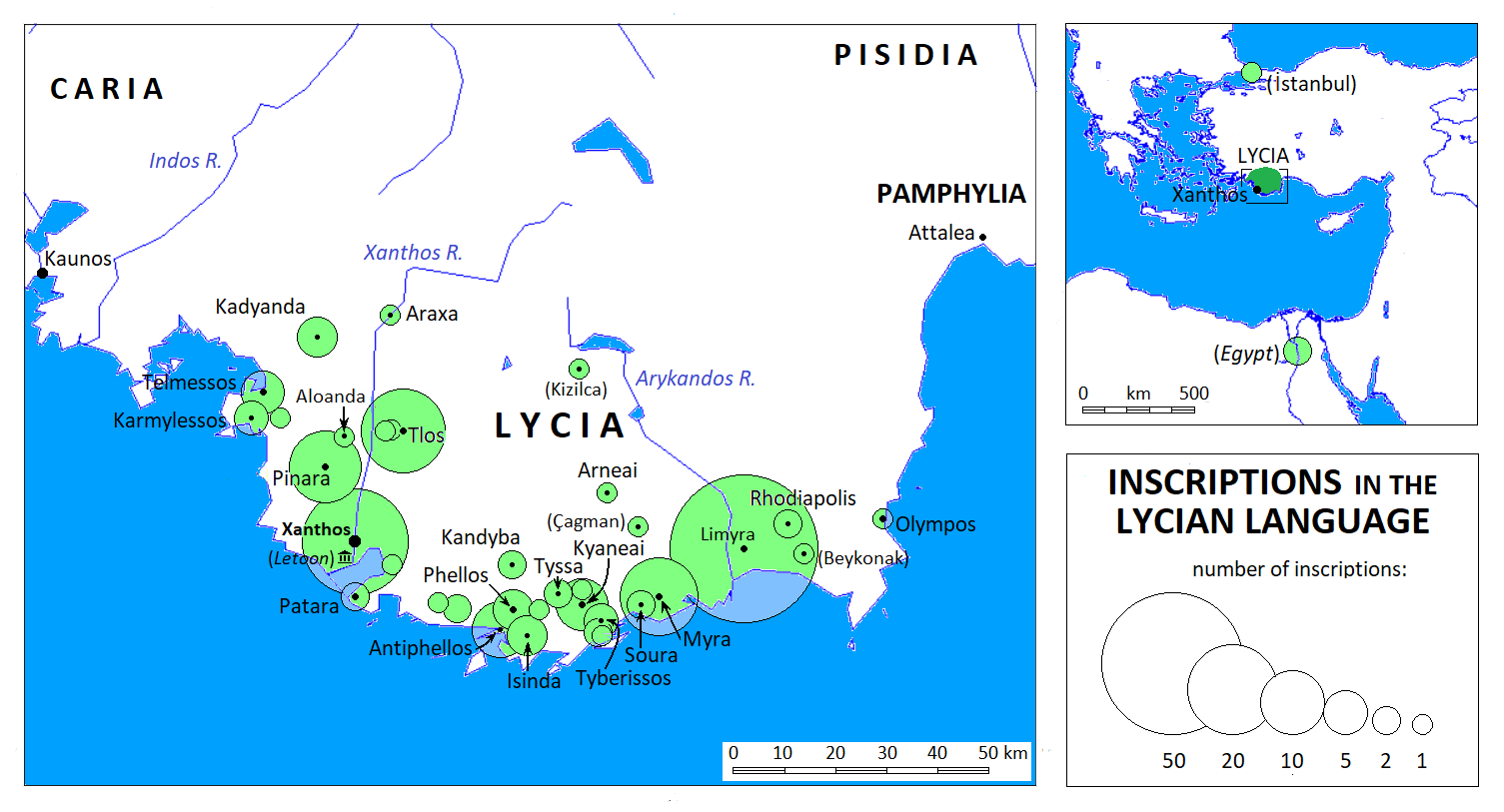
Map showing places where Lycian inscriptions have been found.

Lycian is known from these sources, some of them fairly extensive:

- 172 inscriptions on stone in the Lycian script dating from the 5th and 4th century BC (until ca. 330 BC). They include:
  - The Xanthus stele. The inscribed upper part of a tomb at Xanthos, called the Xanthus Stele or the Xanthus Obelisk. A Lycian A inscription covers the south, east and part of the north faces. The north side also contains a 12 line poem in Greek and additional text, found mainly on the west side, in Milyan. Milyan appears only there and on a tomb in Antiphellos. The total number of lines on the stele is 255, including 138 in Lycian A, 12 in Greek, and 105 in Milyan.
  - The Letoon trilingual, in Lycian A, Greek and Aramaic.
  - 150 burial instructions carved on rock tombs.
  - 20 votive or dedicatory inscriptions.
- About 100 inscriptions on coins minted at Xanthus from the reign of Kuprili, 485-440 BC, to the reign of Pericle, 380-360 BC.
- Personal and place names in Greek.

== Sample text ==
An epitaph in the Lycian language, which reads: 𐊁𐊂𐊚𐊑𐊏𐊚: 𐊓𐊕𐊑𐊏𐊀𐊇𐊒: 𐊎𐊚𐊏: 𐊁𐊓𐊕𐊑𐊏𐊀𐊇𐊀𐊗𐊚: 𐊛𐊀𐊏𐊀𐊅𐊀𐊈𐊀: 𐊛𐊕𐊓𐊓𐊆𐊍𐊀𐊅𐊆: 𐊁𐊛𐊂𐊆: 𐊖𐊁𐊗𐊆𐊅𐊁𐊆𐊎𐊁 ebẽñnẽ prñnawu mẽn. {e prñnawatẽ} hanadaza {hrppi ladi} ehbi setideime "Hanadaza built this building for his wife and sons."

A Lycian epitaph (shown right): 𐊁𐊂𐊚𐊑𐊏𐊚: 𐊓𐊕𐊑𐊏𐊀𐊇𐊒: 𐊎𐊚𐊏: 𐊁𐊓𐊕𐊑𐊏𐊀𐊥𐊀𐊗𐊚: 𐊛𐊀𐊏𐊀𐊅𐊀𐊈𐊀: 𐊛𐊕𐊓𐊓𐊆𐊍𐊀𐊅𐊆: 𐊁𐊛𐊂𐊆: 𐊖𐊁𐊗𐊆𐊅𐊁𐊆𐊎𐊁

Transliteration: Ebẽñnẽ prñnawu mẽn e prñnawatẽ hanadaza hrppi ladi ehbi setideime.

Translation: Hanadaza built this building for his wife and sons.

== Lycian alphabet ==
The Lycian alphabet consists of about 29 signs, many of them reminiscent of the Greek alphabet:

Lycian sign	𐊀	𐊂	𐊄	𐊅	𐊆	𐊇	𐊈	𐊛	𐊉	𐊊	𐊋	𐊍	𐊎	𐊏	𐊒	𐊓	𐊔	𐊕	𐊖	𐊗	𐊁	𐊙	𐊚	𐊐	𐊑	𐊘	𐊌	𐊃	𐊜
transcription	a	b	g	d	i	w	z	h	θ	j (y)	k	l	m	n	u	p	κ (c)	r	s	t	e	ã	ẽ	m̃	ñ	τ	q	β	χ
pronounced (IPA)	/a/	/β/	/ɣ/	/ð/	/i/, /ĩ/	/w/	/t͡s/	/h/	/θ/	/j/	/kʲ~ɡʲ/	/l/, /l̩~əl/	/m/	/n/	/u/, /ũ/	/p~b/	/k/?, /kʲ/?, /h(e)/?	/r/, /r̩~ər/	/s/	/t/	/e/	/ã/	/ẽ/	/m̩~əm/, /m./	/n̩~ən/, /n./	/tʷ/? /t͡ʃ/?	/k/? /kʷ/?	/k/? /kʷ/? /ç/?	/q/? /kʷ/?
Greek equivalent	Α	Β	Γ	Δ	Ε	Ϝ	Ζ	Η	Θ	Ι	Κ	Λ	Μ	Ν	Ο	Π	Ϙ	Ρ	Σ	Τ									Ψ

== Classification ==
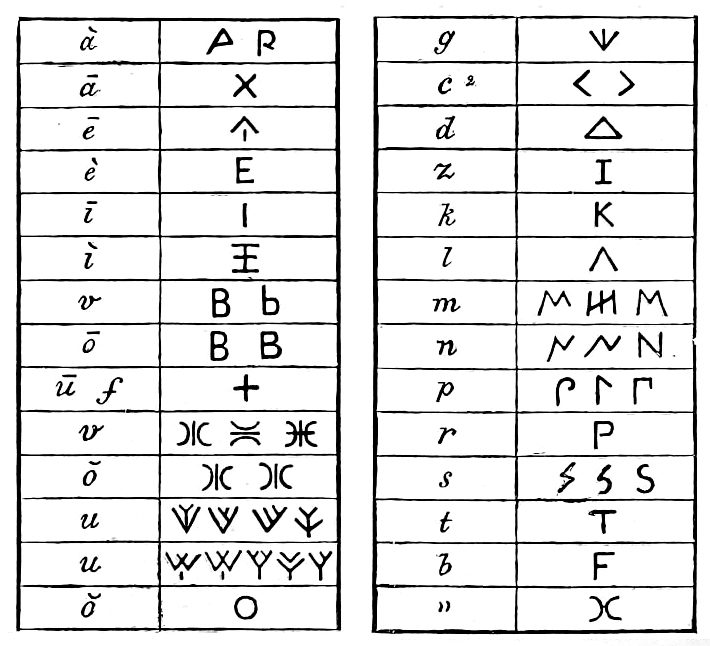
Lycian alphabet: an early attempt at transliteration

Lycian was an Indo-European language, one in the Luwian subgroup of Anatolian languages. A number of principal features help identify Lycian as being in the Luwian group:

- Assibilation of Proto-Indo-European (PIE) palatals (satem change): *h₁éḱwos to Luwian á-zú-wa/i-, Lycian esbe 'horse'.
- Replacement of genitive case with adjectives ending in -ahi or -ehi, Luwian -assi-.
- A preterite active formed with PIE secondary middle endings:
  - PIE *-to to Luwian -ta, Lycian -te or -de in the third person singular
  - PIE *-nto to Luwian -nta, Lycian -(n)te in the third person plural
- Similarity of words: Luwian māssan(i)-, Lycian māhān(i) 'god'.

The Luwian subgroup also includes cuneiform and hieroglyphic Luwian, Carian, Sidetic, Milyan and Pisidic. The pre-alphabetic forms of Luwian extended back into the Late Bronze Age and preceded the fall of the Hittite Empire. These vanished at about the time of the Neo-Hittite states in southern Anatolia (and Syria); thus, the Iron Age members of the subgroup are localized daughter languages of Luwian.

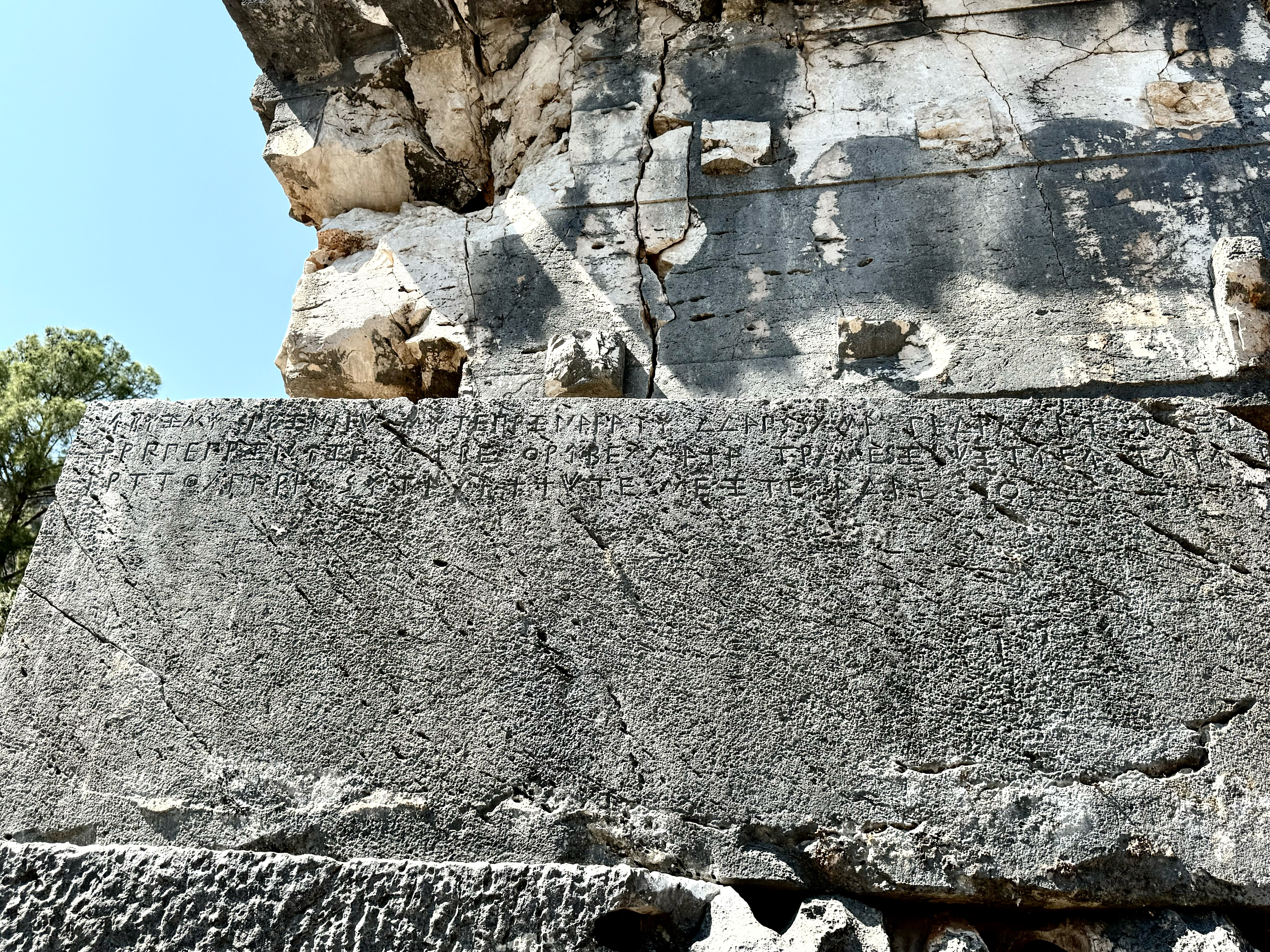
Inscription in Lycian Language, Sarcophagus of Ddapssmma in Pinara, Lycia, 4th cen. BC

Of the Luwic languages, only the Luwian parent language is attested prior to 1000 BC, so it is unknown when the classical-era dialects diverged. Whether the Lukka people always resided in southern Anatolia or whether they always spoke Luwian are different topics.

From the inscriptions, scholars have identified at least two languages that were termed Lycian. One is considered standard Lycian, also termed Lycian A; the other, which is attested on side D of the Xanthos stele, is Milyan or Lycian B, separated by its grammatical particularities.

== Phonology ==
=== Vowels ===
Oral vowels
	Front	Back
High	i ⟨𐊆; i⟩	u ⟨𐊒; u⟩
Mid	e ⟨𐊁; e⟩	
Low	a ⟨𐊀; a⟩	

Nasal vowels
	Front	Central
High	(ĩ ⟨𐊆𐊑; ĩ⟩)	(ũ ⟨𐊒𐊑; ũ⟩)
Mid	ẽ ⟨𐊚; ẽ⟩	
Low	ã ⟨𐊙; ã⟩	

=== Consonants ===
		Labial	Dental	Alveolar		Palatal	Velar		Labio- velar	Uvular	Glottal
		Labial	Dental	plain	lab.	Palatal	plain	pal.	Labio- velar	Uvular	Glottal
Nasal		m ⟨𐊎; m⟩		n ⟨𐊏; n⟩							
Plosive		p ⟨𐊓; p⟩		t ⟨𐊗; t⟩	tʷ? ⟨𐊘; τ⟩	c ⟨𐊔; c⟩	k ⟨𐊌; q⟩	kʲ ⟨𐊋; k⟩	kʷ ⟨𐊃; β⟩	q ⟨𐊜; χ⟩	
Affricate				t͡s ⟨𐊈; z⟩							
Fricative	voiceless		θ ⟨𐊉; θ⟩	s ⟨𐊖; s⟩							h ⟨𐊛; h⟩
Fricative	voiced	β ⟨𐊂; b⟩	ð ⟨𐊅; d⟩				ɣ ⟨𐊄; g⟩				
Rhotic				r ⟨𐊕; r⟩							
Lateral				l ⟨𐊍; l⟩							
Approximant						j ⟨𐊊; y⟩			w ⟨𐊇; w⟩		

- Melchert reconstructs /k/ for ⟨𐊌⟩, /kʷ/ for ⟨𐊃⟩, /q/ for ⟨𐊜⟩ and /θ/ for ⟨𐊉⟩. Kloekhorst instead proposes /kʷ/ for ⟨𐊌⟩, /ç/ for ⟨𐊃⟩, /k/ for ⟨𐊜⟩ and /th/ for ⟨𐊉⟩.
- ⟨𐊘⟩ alternates with ⟨𐊗⟩ and represents a transitional sound between /t/ and /kʷ/. Based on this, Melchert suggested a phonetic value [tʷ] for ⟨𐊘⟩ but later retracted this view.
- Lycian stops /p, t, tʷ, c, kʲ, k, q, kʷ/ (represented by ⟨𐊓⟩, ⟨𐊗⟩, ⟨𐊘⟩, ⟨𐊔⟩, ⟨𐊋⟩, ⟨𐊌⟩, ⟨𐊜⟩ and possibly ⟨𐊃⟩) are voiced as [b, d, dʷ, ɟ, ɡʲ, ɡ, ɢ, ɡʷ] when after nasal consonants and voiceless otherwise.
- Nasal and liquid sounds can also occur as syllabic /m̩, n̩, l̩, r̩/, and with /m̩, n̩/ being written as m̃ ⟨𐊐⟩ and ñ ⟨𐊑⟩ respectively.

== Grammar ==
=== Nouns ===
Nouns and adjectives distinguish singular and plural forms. A dual has not been found in Lycian. There are two genders: animate (or 'common') and inanimate (or 'neuter'). Instead of the genitive singular case normally a so-called possessive (or "genitival adjective") is used, as is common practice in the Luwic languages: a suffix -(e)h- is added to the root of a substantive, and thus an adjective is formed that is declined in turn.

Nouns can be divided in five declension groups: a-stems, e-stems, i-stems, consonant stems, and mixed stems; the differences between the groups are very minor. The declension of nouns goes as follows:

case		ending		lada 'wife, lady'	tideimi 'son, child'	tuhes 'nephew, niece'	tese 'vow, oath'	atlahi 'own'
case		animate	inanimate	(a-stem)	(i/e-stem)	(consonant stem)	(inanimate)	(adjective) (Note: atlahi is the possessive derivative of atla, 'person'.)
Singular	Nominative	-Ø, -s	-~, -Ø, -yẽ	lada	tideimi	tuhes	(tese)	atlahi
Singular	Accusative	-~, -u, -ñ	-~, -Ø, -yẽ	ladã, ladu	tideimi	tuhesñ	(tese)	atlahi
Singular	Ergative	—	?					
Singular	Dative	-i		ladi	tideimi	tuhesi		atlahi
Singular	Locative	-a, -e, -i		(lada)	(tideime)		tesi	(atlahi)
Singular	Genitive	-Ø, -h(e); Possessive: -(e)he-, -(e)hi-		(Poss.:) laθθi				
SIng., Pl.	Ablative-instrumental	-di		(ladadi)	(tideimedi)	tuhedi		
Plural	Nominative	~-i	-a	ladãi	tideimi	tuhẽi	tasa	
Plural	Accusative	-s	-a	ladas	tideimis		tasa	
Plural	Ergative	—	-ẽti				tesẽti, teseti	
Plural	Dative/Locative	-e, -a		lada	tideime	tuhe	tese	atlahe
Plural	Genitive	-ẽ, -ãi		ladãi (?)	tideimẽ			

=== Pronouns ===
==== Demonstrative pronoun ====
The paradigm for the demonstrative pronoun ebe, "this" is:

case	Singular		Plural	
case	animate	inanimate	animate	inanimate
Nominative	ebe	ebẽ	ebẽi	ebeija
Accusative	ebẽ, ebeñnẽ, ebẽñni	ebẽ	ebeis, ebeijes	ebeija
Dative / Locative	ebehi		ebette	
Genitive	(Possessive:) ebehi		ebẽhẽ	
Ablative / Instrumental	?		?	

==== Personal pronoun ====
The demonstrative ebe, 'this', is also used as a personal pronoun: 'this one', therefore 'he, she, it'. Here is a paradigm of all attested personal pronouns:

case		ẽmu, amu 'I'	ẽmi- 'my'	eb(e)- 'he, she, it'	ehbi(je)- 'his'		epttehe/i-, eb(e)ttehe/i- 'their'	
case		ẽmu, amu 'I'	ẽmi- 'my'	eb(e)- 'he, she, it'	animate	inanimate	animate	inanimate
Singular	Nominative	ẽmu, amu	ẽmi	ebe	ehbi	ehbijẽ	ebttehi	
Singular	Accusative	ẽmu, amu	ẽmi	ebñnẽ	ehbi	ehbijẽ		
Singular	Genitive				(Possessive:) ehbijehi			
Singular	Dative	emu			ehbi		ebttehi	
Singular	Ablative/Instrumental				ehbijedi			
Plural	Nominative				ehbi	ehbija	ebttehi	
Plural	Accusative		ẽmis		ehbis	ehbija	ebttehis	
Plural	Genitive							
Plural	Dative / Locative			ebtte	ehbije		epttehe	

==== Other pronouns ====
Other pronouns are:

- Relative or interrogative pronouns: ti-, 'who, which'; teri or ẽke, 'when'; teli, 'where'; km̃mẽt(i)-, 'how many' (also indefinite: 'however many').
- Indefinite pronouns: tike-, 'someone, something'; tise, 'anyone, anything'; tihe, 'any'.
- Reflexive pronoun: -ti (suffixed), 'himself'.

=== Numerals ===
The following numerals are attested:

	cardinal number	'x-fold'	'x-year-old'	also attested
two	[kbi-]	tupm̃me-, 'twofold, pair'	kbisñne/i-, 'two-year-old'	kbihu, 'twice'; kbijẽt(i)-, 'double'; kbi-, kbije-, '(an-)other'; kbisñtãta, 'twenty'
three	teri-	trppem-, 'threefold (?)'	trisñne/i-, 'three-year-old'	(Milyan:) trisu, 'thrice'
four	mupm̃m[-	mupm̃m[-, 'four, fourfold'		
eight	aitãta			
nine	nuñtãta			
twelve	qñnãkba			(Milyan:) qñnãtbisu, 'twelve times'
twenty	kbisñtãta			

=== Verbs ===
Just as in other Anatolian languages (Luwian, Lydian) verbs in Lycian were conjugated in the present-future and preterite tenses and in the imperative with three persons singular and plural. Some endings have many variants, due to nasalization (-a- → -añ-, -ã-; -e- → -eñ-, -ẽ-), lenition (-t- → -d-), gemination (-t- → -tt-; -d- → -dd-), and vowel harmonization (-a- → -e-: prñnawãtẽ → prñnewãtẽ).

About a dozen conjugations can be distinguished, on the basis of (1) the verbal root ending (a-stems, consonant stems, -ije-stems, etc.), and (2) the endings of the third person singular being either unlenited (present -ti; preterite -te; imperative -tu) or lenited (-di; -de; -du). For example, prñnawa-^{(ti)} (to build) is an unlenited a-stem (prñnawati, he builds), a(i)-^{(di)} (to make) is a lenited a(i)-stem (adi, he makes). Differences between the various conjugations are minor.

Verbs are conjugated as follows; Mediopassive (MP) forms are in brown:

			Active	Mediopassive	prñnawa-^{(ti)}	(t)ta-^{(di)}	a(i)-^{(di)}	(h)ha-^{(ti)}	si-^{(?)}
			ending	ending	'to build'	'to put, place'	'to make, do'	'to release'	'to lie' (MP)
Present / future	Singular	1	-u (-w)	-xani, -xãni					sixani
Present / future	Singular	2	?	?					
Present / future	Singular	3	-di, -(t)ti, -i, -e	-ẽni, -tẽni	prñnawati	(t)tadi	adi, edi	hadi, hati	sijẽni, sijeni, sitẽni
Present / future	Plural	1	?	?					
Present / future	Plural	2	(-tẽni ?)	?					
Present / future	Plural	3	~-ti, -(i)ti, -ñti	~-tẽni (?)		tãti (tẽti)	aiti	(h)hãti, (h)hati	sitẽni (?)
Preterite	Singular	1	-(x)xa, -xã, -ga, -ax(a)	-xagã, -xaga (?)	prñnawaxã, -waxa	taxa	axa, aga, axã, agã; (MP:) axagã, axaga		
Preterite	Singular	3	-tẽ, -(t)te, -dẽ, -de	(-tte ?)	prñnawatẽ, -wate (-wetẽ, -wete)	tadẽ, tade (tetẽ ?)	adẽ. ade (ede, ada)	hadẽ, hade	
Preterite	Plural	1	?	?					
Preterite	Plural	3	~-tẽ, -(i)tẽ, -(i)te, ~-te, -ñtẽ, -ñte	?	prñnawãtẽ, -wãte; prñnewãtẽ	tete	aitẽ, aite	hãtẽ, hãte	
Imperative	Singular	1	-lu (?)	?					
Imperative	Singular	2	-Ø	?					
Imperative	Singular	3	-(t)tu, -du, -u	(-tẽnu ?)		tatu		hadu	
Imperative	Plural	2	(-tẽnu ?)	(-tẽnu ?)					
Imperative	Plural	3	~-tu	(~-tẽnu ?)		tãtu, tatu			
Participle Active (Passive?)	Singular		-mi, ~-mi, -me, -ma						
Participle Active (Passive?)	Plural		-mi				(acc. neutr.:) eim̃	(accusative:) hm̃mis	
Infinitive			-ne, ~-ne, -na, ~-na	?		(t)tãne, tane, ttãna		hane, hãne, hhãna	

A suffix -s- (cognate with Greek, Latin -/sk/-), appended to the stem and attested with half a dozen verbs, is thought to make a verb iterative:

stem a(i)-, 'to do, to make', s-stem as-; (Preterite 3 Singular:) ade, adẽ, 'he did, made', astte, 'he always did, has made repeatedly';
stem tuwe-, 'to erect, place (upright)', s-stem tus-; (Present/future 3 Plural:) tuwẽti, 'they erect', tusñti , 'they will erect repeatedly'.

=== Syntax ===
Emmanuel Laroche, who analysed the Lycian text of the Letoon trilingual, concluded that word order in Lycian is slightly more free than in the other Anatolian languages. Sentences in plain text mostly have the structure

ipc (initial particle cluster) - V (Verb) - S (Subject) - O (direct Object).

The verb immediately follows an "initial particle cluster", consisting of a more or less meaningless particle "se-" or "me-" (literally, 'and') followed by a series of up to three suffixes, often called emphatics. The function of some of these suffixes is mysterious, but others have been identified as pronomina like "he", "it", or "them". The subject, direct object, or indirect object of the sentence may thus proleptically be referred to in the initial particle cluster. As an example, the sentence "X built a house" might in Lycian be structured: "and-he-it / he-built / X / a-house".

Other constituents of a sentence, like an indirect object, predicate, or complimentary adjuncts, can be placed anywhere after the verb.

Contrary to this pattern, funeral inscriptions as a rule have a standard form with the object at the head of the sentence: "This tomb built X"; literally: "This tomb / it / he built / X" (order: O - ipc - V - S). Laroche suspects the reason for this deviation to be that in this way emphasis fell on the funerary object: "This object, it was built by X". Example:

1.	ebẽñnẽ prñnawã mẽti prñnawatẽ	This building, [it was] he who built it:
2.	xisteriya xzzbãzeh tideimi	Qisteria, Qtsbatse's son,
3.	hrppi ladi ehbi se tideime	for his wife and for the sons.

In line 1 mẽti = m-ẽ-ti is the initial particle cluster, where m- = me- is the neutral "steppingstone" to which two suffixes are affixed: -ẽ- = "it", and the relative pronoun -ti, "who, he who".

==== Subject-verb-object hypothesis ====
Kim McCone proposed in the 1970s that Lycian's unmarked word order was instead subject-verb-object. The apparent VSO and OVS orders come from various frontings and dislocations of a basic SVO structure.

Lycian's SVO is itself a shift from the typical Anatolian subject-object-verb order, of which Lycian preverbal object pronouns like ẽ "him/her/it" would be a relic.

mexisttẽn ẽ-ep[i]tuwe-te
Megasthenes.NOM it-set.up.PRET-3sg
Megasthenes set it up…

In spite of McCone's alternative analysis, the assumption that verb-subject-object was Lycian's unmarked word order went unchallenged until the 2010s, when Alwin Kloekhorst independently formulated and adopted the SVO hypothesis. This led to other linguists like Heiner Eichner and H. Craig Melchert to adopt the SVO hypothesis after him. The principal unmarked example cited by SVO supporters comes from the following sentence:

pajawa m[a]n[ax]ine: prñnawa-te: prñnaw-ã ebẽ-ñnẽ:
Pajawa.NOM Manaxine build.PRET-3sg building-ACC this-ACC
Pajawa Manaxine built this building. (Note the absence of the initial particle cluster.)

Further examples of subject-initial unmarked clauses cited by Melchert include:

tebursseli prñnawa-te lusñ[tr]e ẽti waziss-e
Tebursseli.NOM build.PRET-3sg Lysander.GEN at leadership-LOC
Tebursseli built (this tomb) under Lysander's leadership.

upazij ẽne-prñnawa-te hrppi prñnezi ehbi
Upazij.NOM it-build.PRET-3sg for household his.DAT
Upazij built it for his household.

== Endonym ==
A few etymological studies of the Lycian language endonym exist, namely:

- Language of the mountain people (Laroche): Luwian tarmi- "pointed object" becomes a hypothetical *tarmašši- "mountainous" used in Trm̃mis- "Lycia." Lycia and Pisidia each had a hill-town named Termessos.
- Attarima (Carruba): A previously unknown Late Bronze Age place name among the Lukka.
- Termilae (Bryce): A people displaced from Crete about 1600 BC.
- Termera (Strabo): A Lelege people displaced by the Trojan War, first settling in Caria and assigning such names as Telmessos, Termera, Termerion, Termeros, Termilae, then displaced to Lycia by the Ionians.

== See also ==
- Letoon trilingual
- Lycia
- Lycian script
- Anatolian languages
