= Proto-Anatolian language =

Reconstructed ancestor of the Anatolian languages

Proto-Anatolian
- Reconstruction of: Anatolian languages
- Region: Anatolia
- Era: c. 3000 BC
- Reconstructed ancestor: Proto-Indo-European

Proto-Anatolian is the proto-language from which the ancient Anatolian languages emerged (i.e. Hittite and its closest relatives). As with almost all other proto-languages, no attested writings have been found; the language has been reconstructed by applying the comparative method to all the attested Anatolian languages as well as other Indo-European languages.

H. Craig Melchert, an expert on the Anatolian languages, estimates that Proto-Anatolian began to diverge c. 3000 BC, in any case no later than c. 2500 BC.

== Sound changes from Proto-Indo-European ==
The phonological changes from Proto-Indo-European (PIE) to Proto-Anatolian may be summarized as follows.

=== Vowel developments ===
Adjacent laryngeals conditioned systematic changes in vowel quality and quantity:

- *e is colored by adjacent laryngeals:
  - eh₂, h₂e > ah₂, h₂a
  - eh₃, h₃e > oh₃, h₃o
- Stressed *é before an obstruent becomes *á and the obstruent is geminated (éȻ > áȻȻ)
- eh₁ > ǣ
- Word-final aH# > ā#
- eRH > aRH
- VHC > V̄C
- The sequences *ey and *ew are contracted to long vowels:
  - ey > ē
  - ew > ū
- Long vowels in unstressed syllables are shortened

=== Consonantal developments ===
==== Development of the stop system ====
The PIE stop system underwent a major restructuring.

- Voiceless stops became geminated
- Voiced stops became voiceless and lengthened the preceding vowel
- Voiced aspirated stops lost aspiration and became voiceless without lengthening the preceding vowel. This preserved the only remaining distinction between original PIE voiced and voiced aspirated stops

Subsequent adjustments include:

- Geminated stops were degeminated after stressed long vowels (with the exception of the cluster *kʷs) and intervocalically (V̄́PP, VPPV > V̄́P, VPV)
- h₂ was assimilated to preceding stops, producing geminates (Ph₂ > PP)

==== Laryngeal developments ====
Laryngeals were retained into Proto-Anatolian but underwent a series of conditioned changes, resulting in a new set of laryngeals.

- In sequences *Ch₂y and *Ch₂V, the laryngeal was lost
  - Ch₂y > Cy
  - Ch₂V > CV
- In sequences of the type *VHsV, the laryngeal assimilated into *VssV
- Likewise, in *VRHV sequences, the laryngeal was also assimilated (VRHV > VRRV)
- CH# > C#
- *h₂ in sequences V̄́h₂ and Vh₂V are developed into singleton /ħ/ (written as h in Proto-Anatolian notation)
- All remaining *h₂ developed into geminate /ħː/ (written as H in Proto-Anatolian notation)
- Word-initial *h₃ also developed into singleton /ħ/
- All remaining PIE laryngeals were subsequently lost
- The new PA laryngeals are labialized before *w (Hw, hw > Hʷ, hʷ)

==== Resonants and liquid developments ====
- Syllabic resonants in the environment *CwR̩C developed as *CuRC
- *n is dissimilated before two nasals (nVNN > lVNN)
- *o is metathesized in specific sequences (Clos, Cros, Clom, Crom > Cols, Cors, Colm, Corm)
- *n is assimilated into the preceding resonant:
  - VlnV > VllV
  - VmnV > VmmV
- *lh₁n > ln (this sound change happens after the previous assimilation is complete)
- Final *r was lost after unstressed vowels (Vr# > V#)

==== Other developments ====
- Word-initial *y was lost before *e
- *t underwent allophonic palatalization before *y
- Final *t is lost after *n (nt# > n#)

== Phonology ==
For the most part, Proto-Anatolian has been reconstructed on the basis of Hittite, the best-attested Anatolian language. However, the usage of Hittite cuneiform writing system limits the enterprise of understanding and reconstructing Anatolian phonology, partly from the deficiency of the adopted Akkadian cuneiform syllabary to represent Hittite phonemes and partly from Hittite scribal practices.

It is especially pertinent to what appears to be confusion of voiceless and voiced dental stops, in which signs -dV- and -tV- are employed interchangeably in different attestations of the same word. Furthermore, in the syllables of the structure VC, only the signs with voiceless stops are usually used. Distribution of spellings with single and geminated consonants in the oldest extant monuments indicates that the reflexes of Proto-Indo-European voiceless stops were spelled as double consonants and the reflexes of PIE voiced stops as single consonants. This regularity is the most consistent in the case of dental stops in older texts; later monuments often show irregular variation of this rule.

=== Vowels ===
Vowels	Front	Central	Back
Close	*i /i/, *ī /iː/		*u /u/, *ū /uː/
Mid	*e /e/, *ē /eː/		*o /o/, *ō /oː/
Open	*ǣ /æː/	*a /a/, *ā /aː/	

Common Anatolian preserves the PIE vowel system basically intact. Some cite the merger of PIE */o/ and */a/ (including from *h₂e) as a Common Anatolian innovation, but according to Melchert that merger was a secondary shared innovation in Hittite, Palaic and Luwian, but not in Lycian. Concordantly, Common Anatolian had the following short vowel segments: */i/, */u/, */e/, */o/ and */a/.

Among the long vowels, */eː/ < PIE *ē is distinguished from */æː/ < PIE *eh₁, with the latter yielding ā in Luwian, Lydian and Lycian. Melchert (1994) had also earlier assumed a contrast between a closer mid front vowel */eː/ < PIE *ey (yielding Late Hittite ī) and a more open */ɛː/ < PIE *ē (remaining Late Hittite ē), but the examples are few and can be accounted for otherwise.

PIE syllabic consonants are also preserved in Common Anatolian.

The status of the opposition between long and short vowels is not entirely clear, but it is known for certain that it does not keep the PIE contrast intact, as Hittite spelling varies in a way that makes it very hard to establish whether vowels were inherently long or short. Even with older texts being apparently more conservative and consistent in notation, there are significant variations in vowel length in different forms of the same lexeme. It has been thus suggested by Carruba (1981) that the so-called scriptio plena represents not long vowels but rather stressed vowels, reflecting the position of free PIE accent.

Carruba's interpretation is not universally accepted; according to Melchert, the only function of scriptio plena is to indicate vowel quantity; according to him the Hittite a/ā contrasts inherits diphonemic Proto-Anatolian contrast, */ā/ reflecting PIE */o/, */a/ and */ā/, and Proto-Anatolian */a/ reflecting PIE */a/. According to Melchert, the lengthening of accented short vowels in open syllables cannot be Proto-Anatolian, and the same goes for lengthening in accented closed syllables.

However, in Hoffner and Melchert (2008), it is stated that scriptio plena was rarely used to mark yes-no questions, since there was no question mark in Hittite script. This usage comes from scribes in Assyria and Babylonia who wrote Akkadian in cuneiform script.

=== Consonants ===
Consonant phonemes
		Labial	Alveolar		Palatal	Velar			Pharyngeal	
		Labial	Alveolar		Palatal	palatal	plain	labial	plain	labial
Nasal	lenis	*m	*n							
Nasal	fortis	*mm /mː/	*nn /nː/							
Plosive	lenis	*b /p/	*d /t/			*ǵ /kʲ/	*g /k/	*gʷ /kʷ/		
Plosive	fortis	*p /pː/	*t /tː/ [t͡s]			*ḱ /kʲː/	*k /kː/	*kʷ /kʷː/		
Fricative	lenis		*s [z]						*h /ħ/	*hʷ /ħʷ/
Fricative	fortis		*ss /sː/						*H /ħː/	*Hʷ /ħʷː/
Liquid	lenis		*r	*l						
Liquid	fortis		*rr /rː/	*ll /lː/						
Glide					*y /j/			*w		

One of the more characteristic phonological features common to all Anatolian languages is the gemination of the Proto-Indo-European voiceless consonants (including the sibilant *s and the laryngeal *ḫ) between unstressed syllables and following long vowels. The two can be considered together as a gemination rule between unstressed morae, if long vowels are analyzed as a sequence of two vowels. All initial voiced stops in Anatolian eventually merge with the plain voiceless stops; Luwian, however, shows different treatment of voiced velar stops *G- and unvoiced velar stops *K- (initial *G being palatalized to */j/ and then lost before /i/, unlike *K), showing that this was a late areal development, not a Proto-Anatolian one.

Proto-Anatolian is the only daughter language of Proto-Indo-European to directly inherit the laryngeal consonants. In transcriptions of Anatolian languages written in cuneiform, the letter ‹ḫ› represents a sound (Proto-Anatolian *H) going back to the laryngeal *h₂ and probably but less certainly also *h₃. It is not known what the placement of the Anatolian laryngeal was, one theory is it was pronounced as a pharyngeal fricative /ħ/, but it could have also been velar /x/, uvular /χ/, or glottal /h/ based on PA's descendents. The sequences *h₂w and *h₃w yield a labialized laryngeal *ḫʷ. In 2018, Alwin Kloekhorst proposed the phonetic values [q] and [qː] based on Lycian and Carian evidences (with the labialised forms [qʷ] and [qːʷ] for *ḫʷ.)

In addition to the laryngeals, Common Anatolian was long also thought to be the only daughter to preserve the three-part velar consonant distinction from Proto-Indo-European. The best evidence for this was thought to come from its daughter language Luwian. However, Melchert disputes this and categorizes Anatolian as a centum branch.

The liquids and nasals are inherited intact from Proto-Indo-European, and so is the glide *w. No native Proto-Anatolian words begin with *r-. One possible explanation is that it was true in Proto-Indo-European as well. Another is that it is a feature of languages from the area in which the daughter languages of Proto-Anatolian were spoken.

== Morphology ==
Proto-Anatolian had two verb conjugations. The first, the mi-conjugation was clearly derived from the familiar Proto-Indo-European present tense endings. The second, the ḫi-conjugation appears to be derived from the Proto-Indo-European perfect. One explanation is that Anatolian turned the perfect into a present tense for a certain group of verbs while another, newer theory is that the ḫi verbs continue a special class of presents which had a complicated relationship with the Proto-Indo-European perfect.
