= Dominik Fleitmann =

Dominik Fleitmann is professor of Quaternary Geology at the University of Basel. Fleitmann primarily researches palaeoclimatology using stalagmites collected from caves in the Middle East and has also linked these records to societal impacts using archaeological and historical evidence.

According to Fleitmann, his research into stalagmites found in modern-day Saudi Arabia demonstrates a link between rainfall and human migration from the region, and a correlation between a period of severe drought and the collapse of the Kingdom of Himyar.
