= Yanartaş =

Geographical feature in Kemer, Antalya, Turkey

Coordinates: 36°25′54″N 30°27′21″E

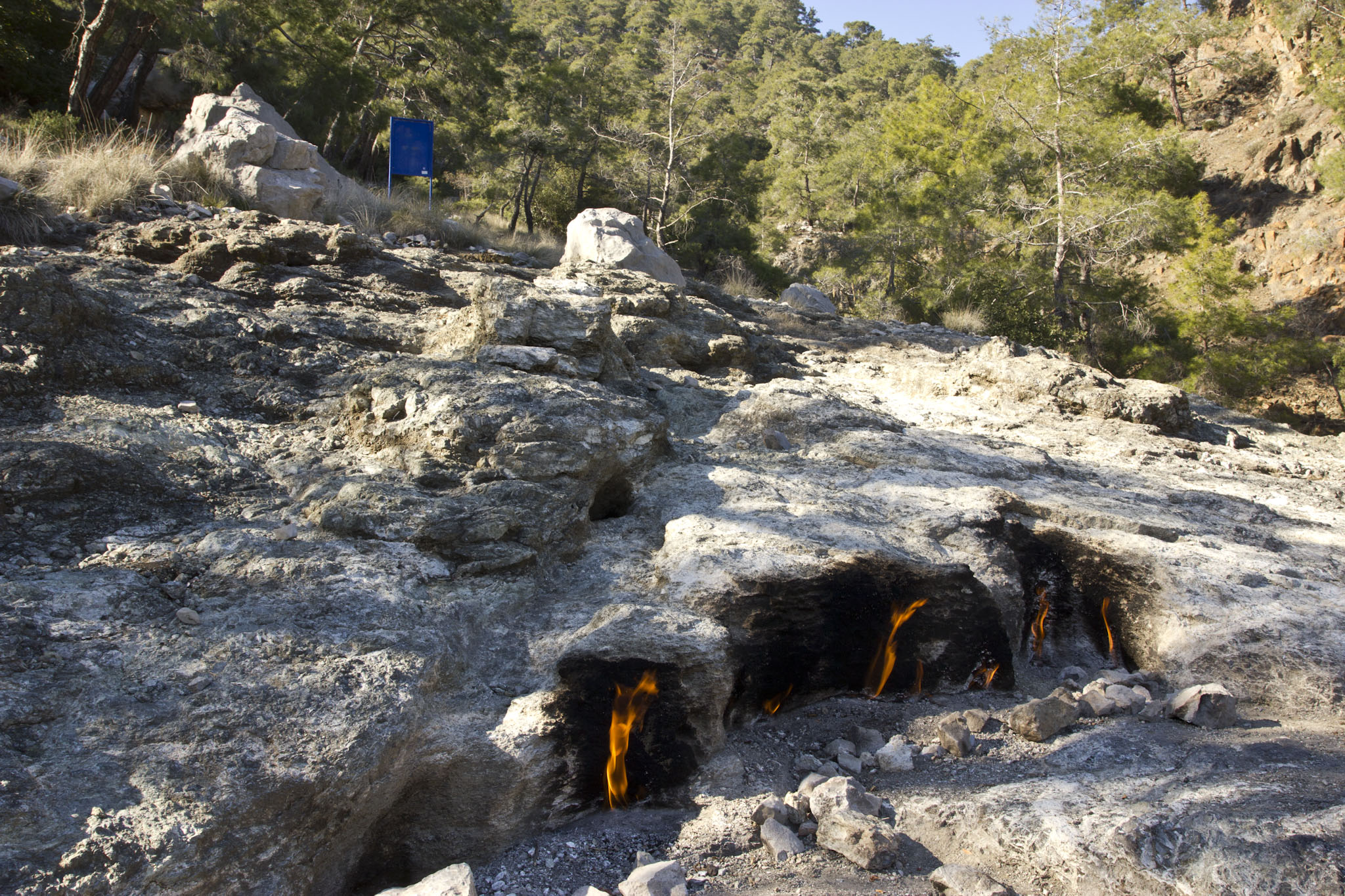
Constantly flaming Yanartaş

Yanartaş ([janaɾˈtaʃ], Turkish for "flaming stone") is a geographical feature near the Olympos valley and national park in Antalya Province in southwestern Turkey. It is the site of dozens of small fires which burn constantly from vents in the rocks on the side of the mountain. Directly below the fires are the ruins of the temple of Hephaistos, the Greek god who was associated with fire through his role as the blacksmith to the gods. To see the fires and the ruins, visitors must first go to the entrance at the foot of the mountain. The site is at the top of an easy one kilometre climb. Most people visit at night, when the fires are at their most spectacular.

In ancient times sailors could navigate by the flames, but today they are more often used to brew tea.

== Location ==
The location is 80 km southwest of Antalya, near the town of Çıralı. The area is located on a track popular with hikers and trekkers on the Lycian Way.

== Fires ==
The fires are grouped over an area of 5000 m^{2} and are fueled by gas emissions which have been burning for at least 2500 years. These emissions seem to change seasonally: vents and flames are more vigorous in winter months. This is a common characteristic of such seeps, where gas flux is typically modulated by gas pressure build-up induced by groundwater recharge and changes in atmospheric pressure.

== Gas composition ==
The vents emit mainly methane (87%). The rest is made of hydrogen (7.5–11%), nitrogen (2–4.9%), light alkanes (0.57%), carbon dioxide (0.01–0.07%) and helium (80 ppmv). These proportions and the isotopic composition indicates a mix from two origins, in equal part:

- an organic thermogenic gas, related to type III kerogen occurring in Palaeozoic and Mesozoic organic-rich sedimentary rocks,
- an abiogenic gas produced by low-temperature serpentinization in the Tekirova ophiolitic unit.

== Source of gas ==
Abiotic methane ordinarily forms at temperatures much higher than those that occur in the rocks at Yanartaş. However, ruthenium is present in the igneous rocks under the flames, and is believed to act as a catalyst, permitting the formation of methane at the lower temperatures (i.e., below 100 °C) that occur at Yanartaş.

These vents represent the biggest emission of abiogenic methane discovered on land so far. The emissions do not have a volcanic origin, since methane is not related to mantle or magma degassing.

== The Chimera ==
In the Iliad, Homer tells the story of a fire-breathing monster called the Chimera, who was "in the fore part a lion, in the hinder a serpent, and in the midst a goat, breathing terrifying, blazing fire.” The place where she lived was called Mount Chimaera. An Irish-born British naval officer named Francis Beaufort surveyed the region in 1811 and concluded that Yanartaş was the fabled mountain, citing the ancient Roman writer Pliny, who had made the same claim. Although Beaufort's theory has several supporters, other authorities disagree.

== See also ==
- Çıralı
- Lycia
- Kemer

== Books ==
- A.M. Celal Sengör (2003). The Large Wavelength Deformations in the Lithosphere: Materials for a History of the Evolution of Thought from the Earliest Times to Plate Tectonics p. 310 Endnotes. Geological Society of America. ISBN 978-0-8137-1196-6.
- George E. Bean (1978). Lycian Turkey. Ernest Benn, London. ISBN 978-0-510-03205-0.
