= Göynük (disambiguation) =

Göynük is a town in Bolu Province, Turkey, the seat of Göynük District.

Göynük may also refer to:

- Göynük, Azerbaijan, a village and municipality in the Babek District of Nakhchivan
- Göynük, Ağaçören, a village in the Ağaçören District, Aksaray Province, Turkey
- Göynük, Çobanlar, a village in Afyonkarahisar Province, Turkey
- Göynük, Karlıova, a village in Bingöl Province, Turkey
- Göynük, Kemer, a neighbourhood in Antalya Province, Turkey
- Göynük, Pazarcık, a village in Kahramanmaraş Province, Turkey
- Göynük Canyon, a chasm in Antalya Province, Turkey
- Göynük District, a district of Bolu Province, Turkey
