= Ulupınar, Kemer =

Ulupınar
- Neighbourhood
- Location in Turkey
- Coordinates: 36°27′13″N 30°25′57″E
- Country: Turkey
- Province: Antalya
- District: Kemer
- Population (2022): 1,315
- Time zone: UTC+3 (TRT)

Ulupınar is a neighbourhood of the municipality and district of Kemer, Antalya Province, Turkey. Its population is 1,315 (2022).

It is situated 25 kilometres from the district centre of Kemer. It is on the outskirts of the Olympos Valley National Park, known for its eternal fire. Particularly noted areas are the dense woods and the source of a river (which gives its name to the region; pınar meaning water source in Turkish) where waters spurt out from rocks at an altitude and descends in a waterfall. There are several restaurants situated along the river near the village, which is on the axis of the road from Kemer to Finike and Kumluca, and these serve trout from the river as well as more varied dishes.

The extension of Ulupınar village toward the seashore constitute the village of Çıralı, notable for its long beach and tourism facilities.
