= Chimera (mythology) =

Mythical or fictional creature with parts taken from various animals

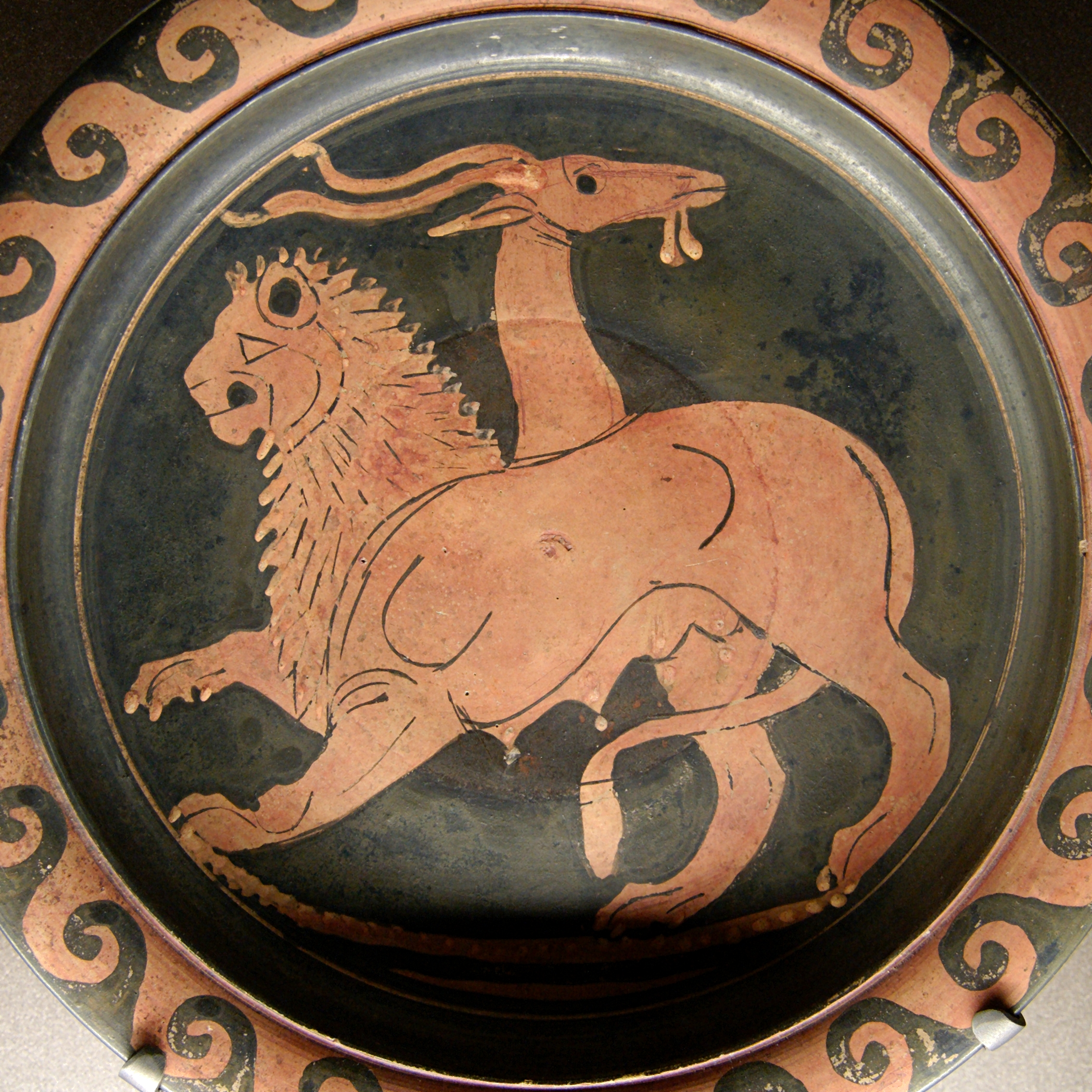
- The Chimera on a red-figure Apulian plate, c. 350–340 BC (Musée du Louvre)
- Abode: Lycia

Genealogy
- Parents: Typhon and Echidna
- Siblings: Lernaean Hydra, Orthrus, Cerberus (Note: Both Hesiod and Pseudo-Apollodorus agree that these were the Chimera's siblings. However, the latter states, in his Bibliotheca, that her other siblings are the Sphinx, Nemean Lion, Crommyonian Sow, Ladon, Caucasian Eagle.)
- Consort: Orthrus (Note: According to Hesiod's Theogony.)
- Offspring: Nemean lion, Sphinx

The Chimera, Chimaera, Chimæra, or Khimaira (/kaɪˈmɪərə, kɪ-, -mɛər-/ ky-MEER-ə, kih-, -MAIR-; Ancient Greek: Χίμαιρα, romanized: Chímaira, lit. 'she-goat') was a monstrous fire-breathing hybrid creature in Greek mythology, said to be from Lycia, Asia Minor, and composed of different animal parts. Typically, it is depicted as a lion with a goat's head protruding from its back and a tail ending with a snake's head. Some representations also include dragon's wings. It was an offspring of Typhon and Echidna and a sibling of monsters like Cerberus and the Lernaean Hydra.

The term "chimera" has come to describe any mythical or fictional creature with parts taken from various animals.

== Mythology ==
=== Family ===
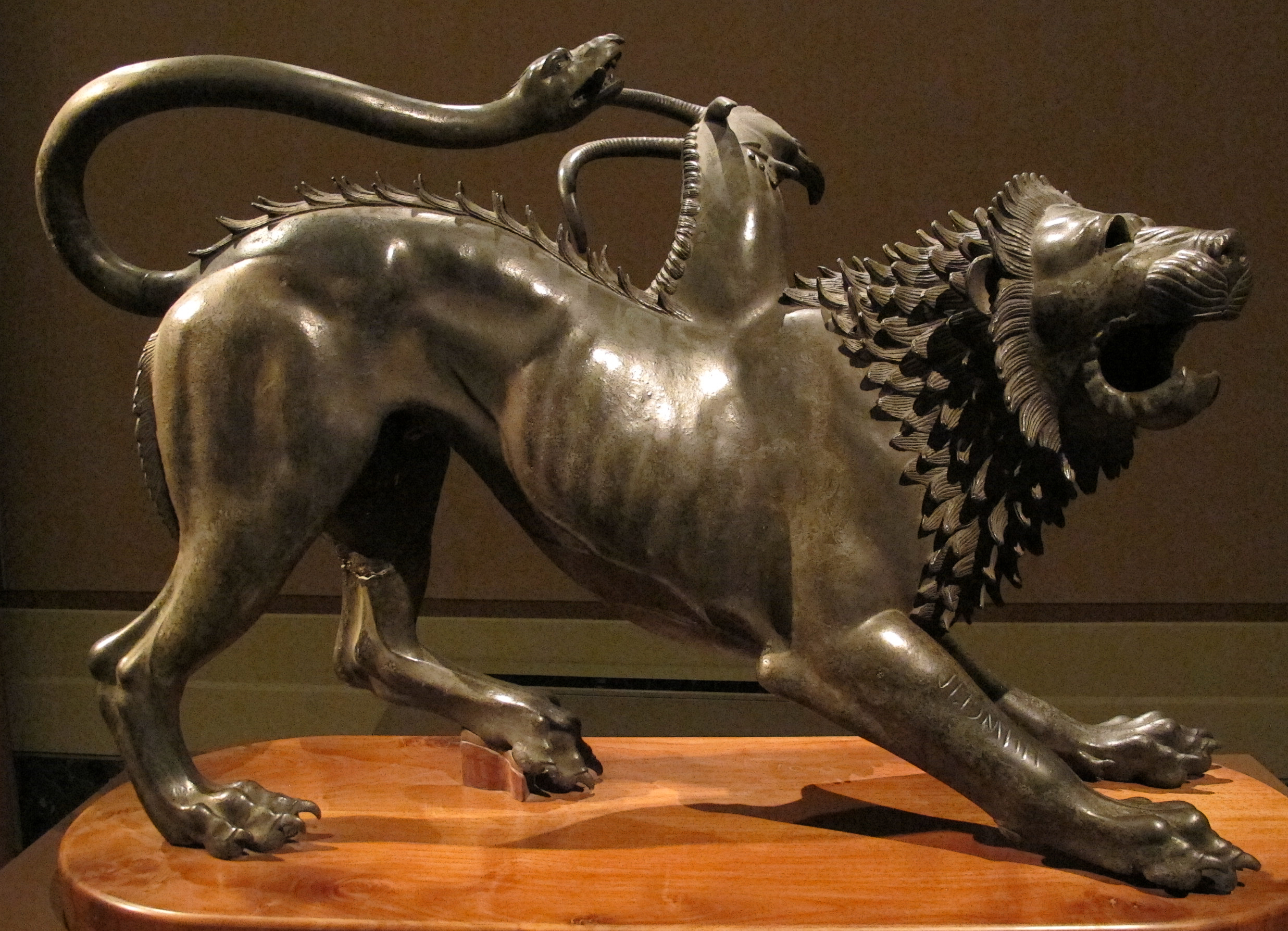
"Chimera of Arezzo": an Etruscan bronze

According to Hesiod, the Chimera's mother was a certain ambiguous "she", which may refer to Echidna, in which case the father would presumably be Typhon, though possibly (unlikely) the Hydra or even Ceto was meant instead. However, the mythographers Apollodorus (citing Hesiod as his source) and Hyginus both make the Chimera the offspring of Echidna and Typhon. Hesiod also has the Sphinx and the Nemean lion as the offspring of Orthus and another ambiguous "she", often understood as probably referring to the Chimera, although possibly instead to Echidna, or again even Ceto.

=== Description ===
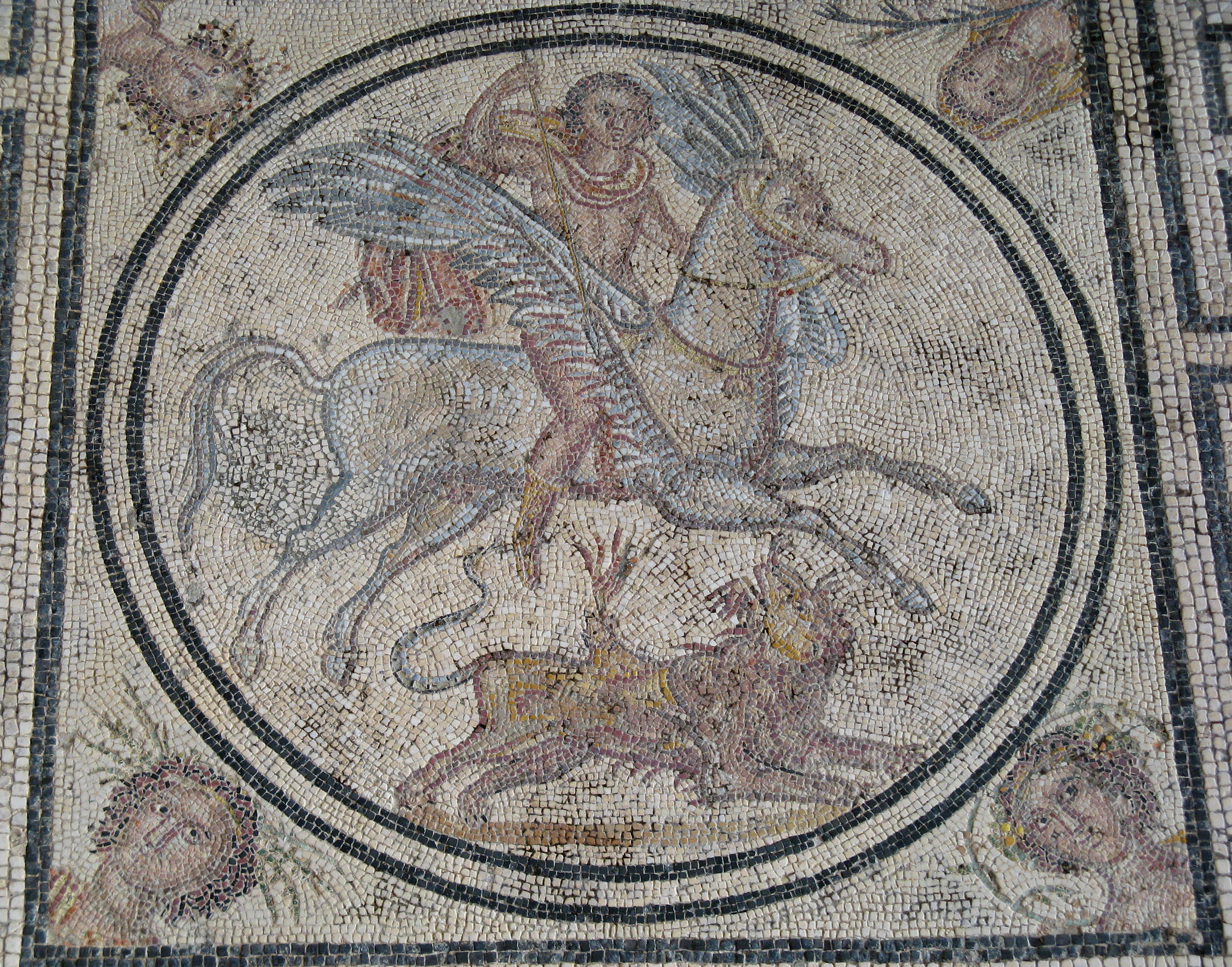
A Roman mosaic of Bellerophon riding Pegasus and slaying the Chimera, 2nd to 3rd centuries AD, Musée de la Romanité

Homer described the Chimera in the Iliad, saying that "she was of divine stock not of men, in the fore part a lion, in the hinder a serpent, and in the midst a goat, breathing forth in terrible wise the might of blazing fire." Hesiod and Apollodorus gave similar descriptions: a three-headed creature with a lion in front, a fire-breathing goat in the middle, and a serpent in the rear.

=== Cumaean Sibyl ===
In a lesser known tale, the Cumaean Sibyl encountered the Chimera in a vision, interpreting it as an omen. She advised her followers to establish harmony in their community to prevent the chaos and destruction that might have been brought about by the Chimera.

=== Killed by Bellerophon ===
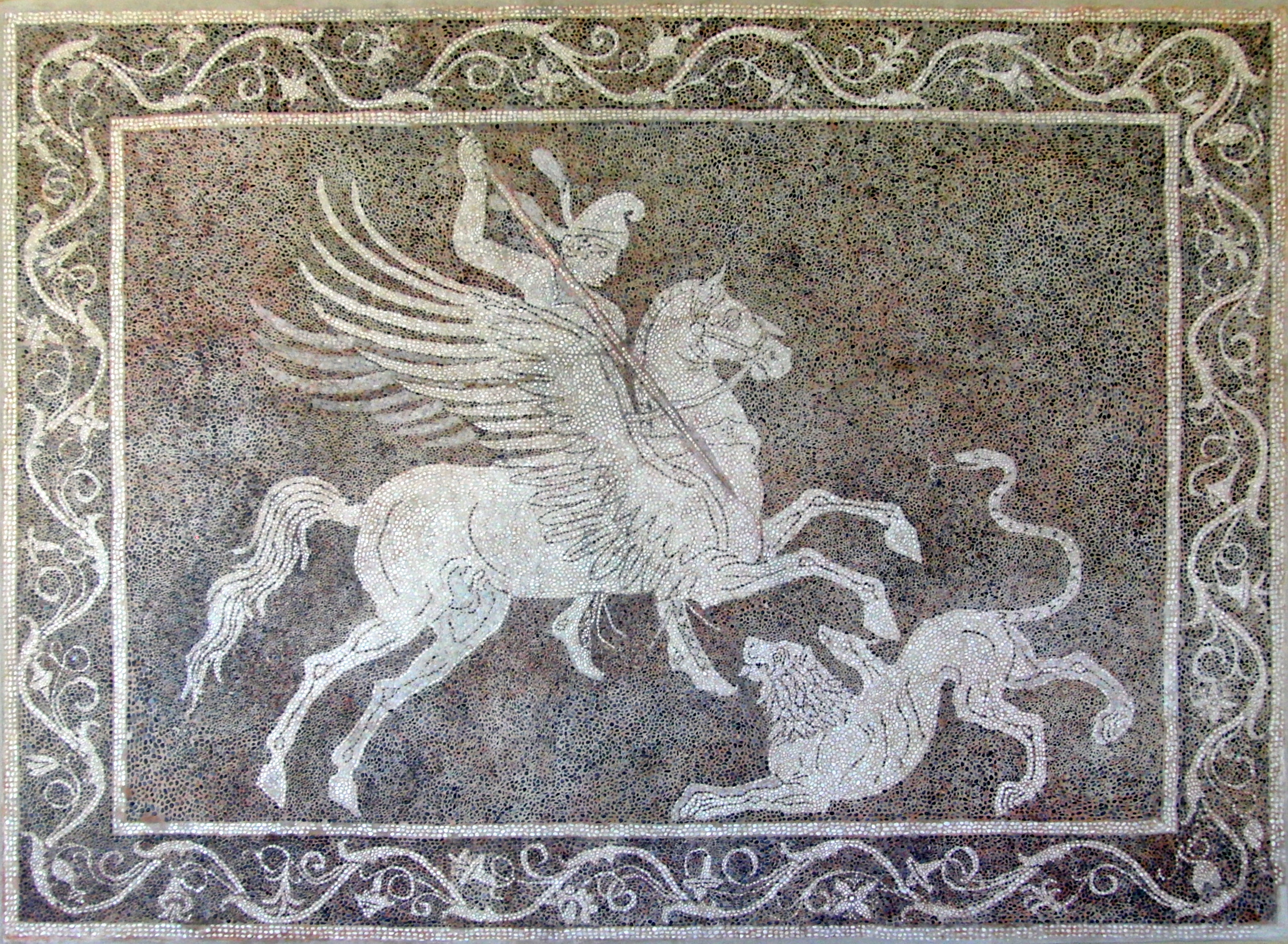
A Hellenistic Greek pebble mosaic depicting Bellerophon riding Pegasus while killing the Chimera, Archaeological Museum of Rhodes, dated 300–270 BC

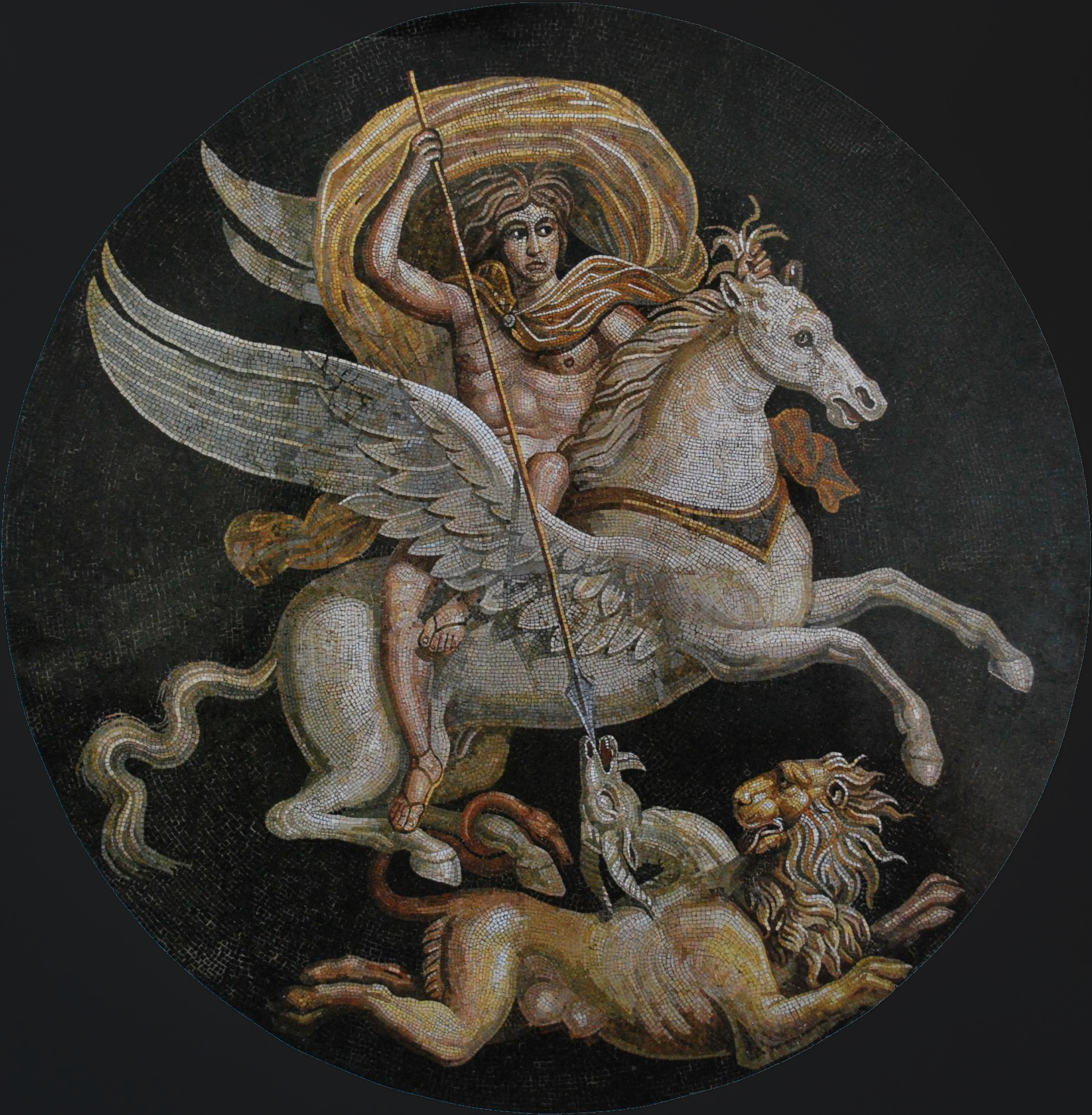
Bellerophon riding Pegasus and slaying the Chimera, central medallion of a Gallo-Roman mosaic from Autun, Musée Rolin, 2nd to 3rd century AD

According to Homer, the Chimera, who was reared by Araisodarus (the father of Atymnius and Maris, Trojan warriors killed by Nestor's sons Antilochus and Trasymedes) was "a bane to many men". As told in the Iliad, the hero Bellerophon was ordered by the king of Lycia to slay the Chimera (hoping the monster would kill Bellerophon). Still, the hero, "trusting in the signs of the gods", succeeded in killing the Chimera. Hesiod adds that Bellerophon had help in killing the Chimera, saying, "her did Pegasus and noble Bellerophon slay".

Apollodorus gave a more complete account of the story. Iobates, the king of Lycia, had ordered Bellerophon to kill the Chimera (who had been killing cattle and had "devastated the country") since he thought that the Chimera would instead kill Bellerophon, "for it was more than a match for many, let alone one". But the hero mounted his winged horse Pegasus (who had sprung from the blood of Medusa) "and soaring on high shot down the Chimera from the height."

== Iconography ==
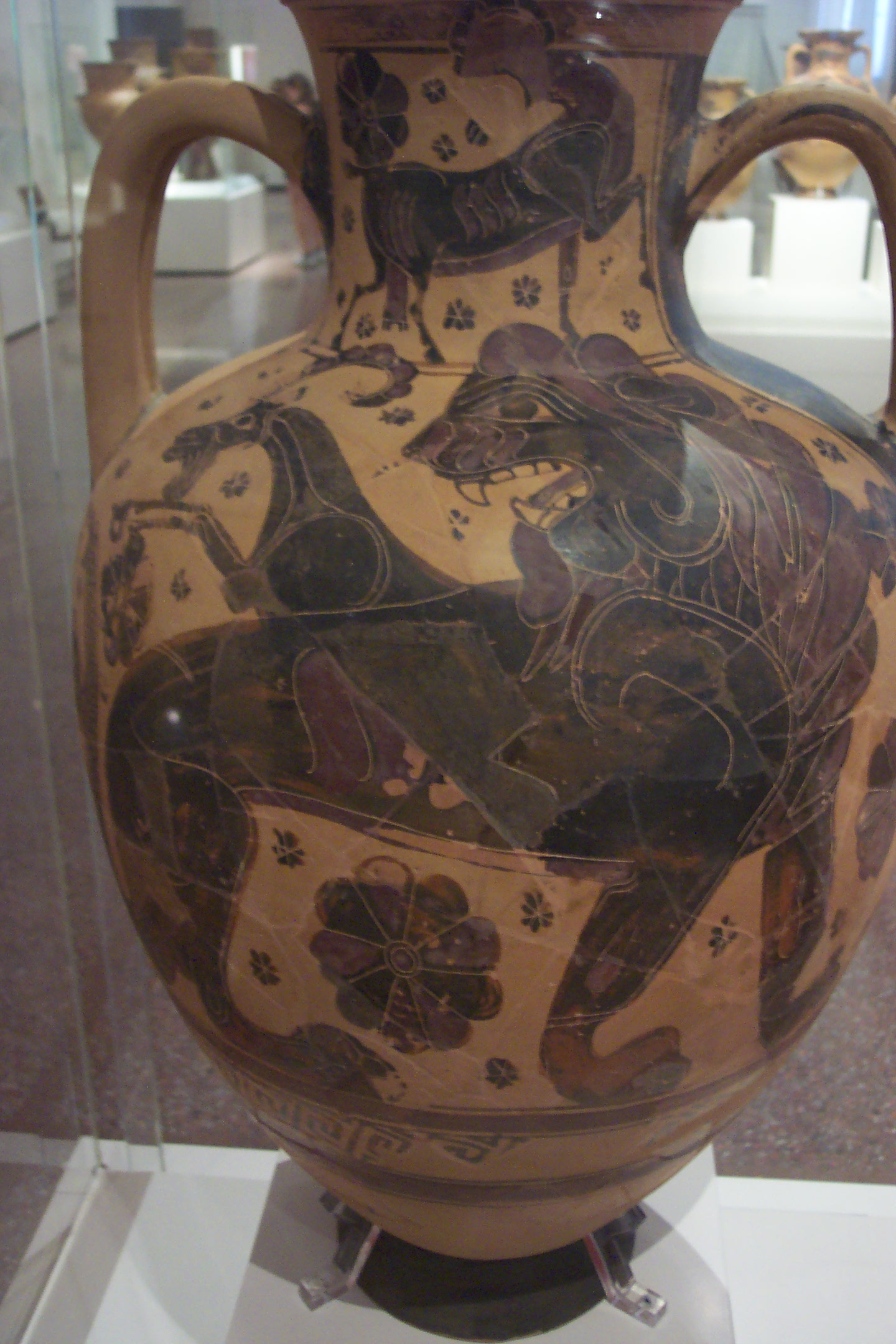
Chimera depicted on an Attic vase

Although the Chimera was, according to Homer, situated in foreign Lycia, her representation in the arts was wholly Greek. An autonomous tradition that did not rely on the written word was represented in the visual repertory of the Greek vase painters. The Chimera first appeared early in the repertory of the proto-Corinthian pottery painters, providing some of the earliest identifiable mythological scenes that may be recognized in Greek art. After some early hesitation, the Corinthian type was fixed in the 670s BC; the variations in the pictorial representations suggest multiple origins to Marilyn Low Schmitt. The fascination with the monstrous devolved by the end of the seventh century into a decorative Chimera motif in Corinth, while the motif of Bellerophon on Pegasus took on a separate existence alone. A separate Attic tradition, where the goats breathe fire and the animal's rear is serpentine, begins with the confidence that Marilyn Low Schmitt is convinced that there must be unrecognized or undiscovered local precursors. Two vase painters employed the motif so consistently they were given the pseudonyms the Bellerophon Painter and the Chimaera Painter.

== Similar creatures ==
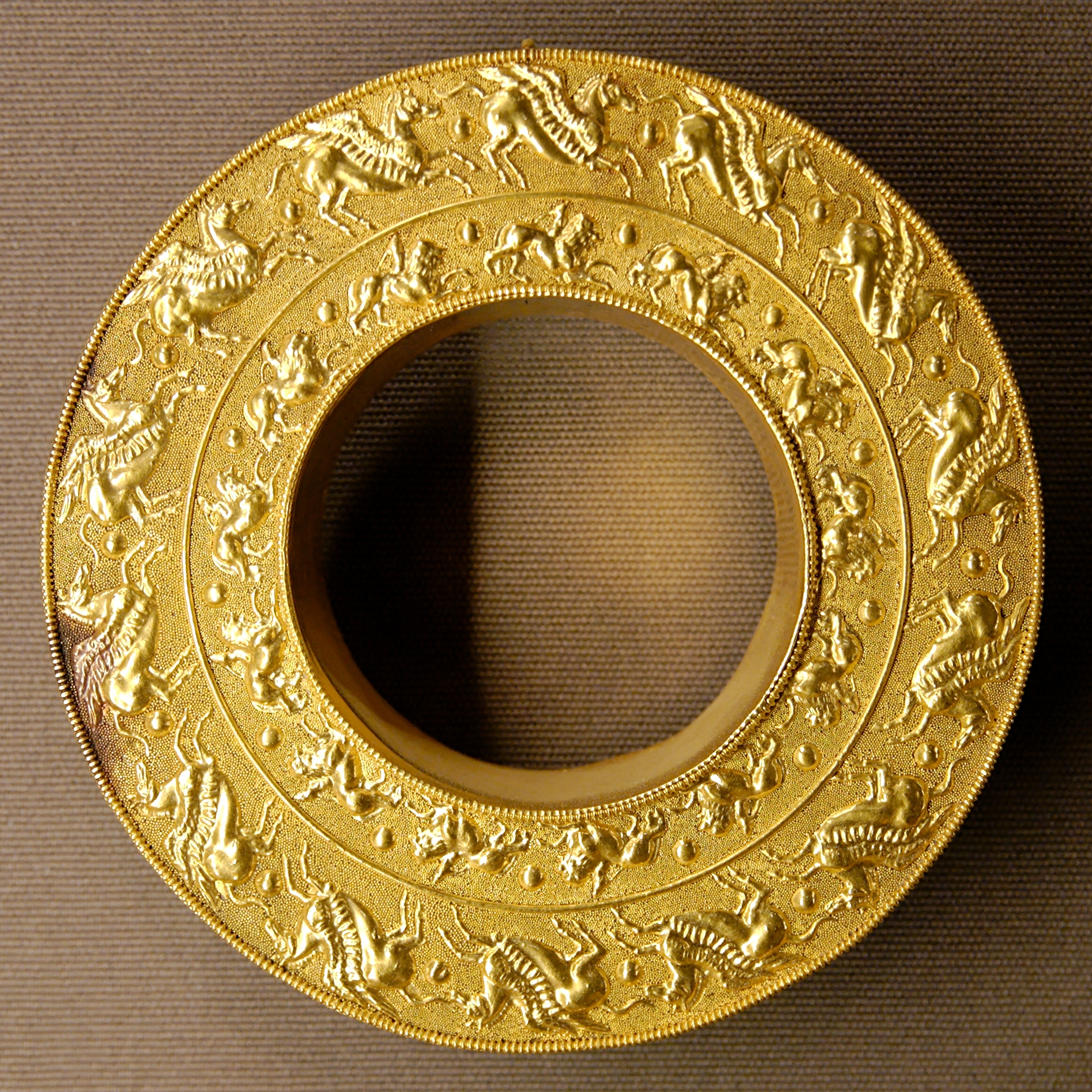
Gold reel, possibly an ear-stud, with a winged Pegasus (outer band) and the Chimera (inner band), Magna Graecia or Etruria, fourth century BC (Louvre)

A fire-breathing lioness was one of the earliest solar and war deities in Ancient Egypt (representations from 3000 years prior to the Greeks), and influences are feasible. The lioness represented the war goddess and protector of both cultures that would unite as Ancient Egypt. Sekhmet was one of the dominant deities in upper Egypt and Bast in lower Egypt. As the divine mother, and more especially as protector, for Lower Egypt, Bast became strongly associated with Wadjet, the patron goddess of Lower Egypt.

In the Etruscan civilization, the Chimera appears in the Orientalizing period that precedes Etruscan Archaic art. The Chimera appears in Etruscan wall paintings of the fourth century BC.

In the Indus Valley Civilisation, the Chimera is depicted in many seals. There are different kinds of Chimera composed of animals from the Indian subcontinent. This Chimera has been called the Harappan Chimera.

Although the Chimera of antiquity was forgotten in Medieval art, chimerical figures appear as embodiments of the deceptive, even satanic, forces of raw nature. They were depicted with a human face and a scaly tail, as in Dante's vision of Geryon in Inferno xvii.7–17, 25–27, hybrid monsters, more akin to the Manticore of Pliny's Natural History (viii.90), provided iconic representations of hypocrisy and fraud well into the seventeenth century through a symbolic representation in Cesare Ripa's Iconological.

== Classical sources ==
The myths of the Chimera may be found already in Hesiod's Theogony (l. 319ff) and Homer's Iliad (book 6). Later it appears in the Bibliotheca of Pseudo-Apollodorus (book 1), Fabulae 57 and 151 of Hyginus, and the Metamorphoses (6.339 and 9.648) by Ovid. Virgil in the Aeneid (book 5) employs Chimaera for the name of a gigantic ship of Gyas in the ship-race, with possible allegorical significance in contemporary Roman politics.

== Hypothesis about origin ==
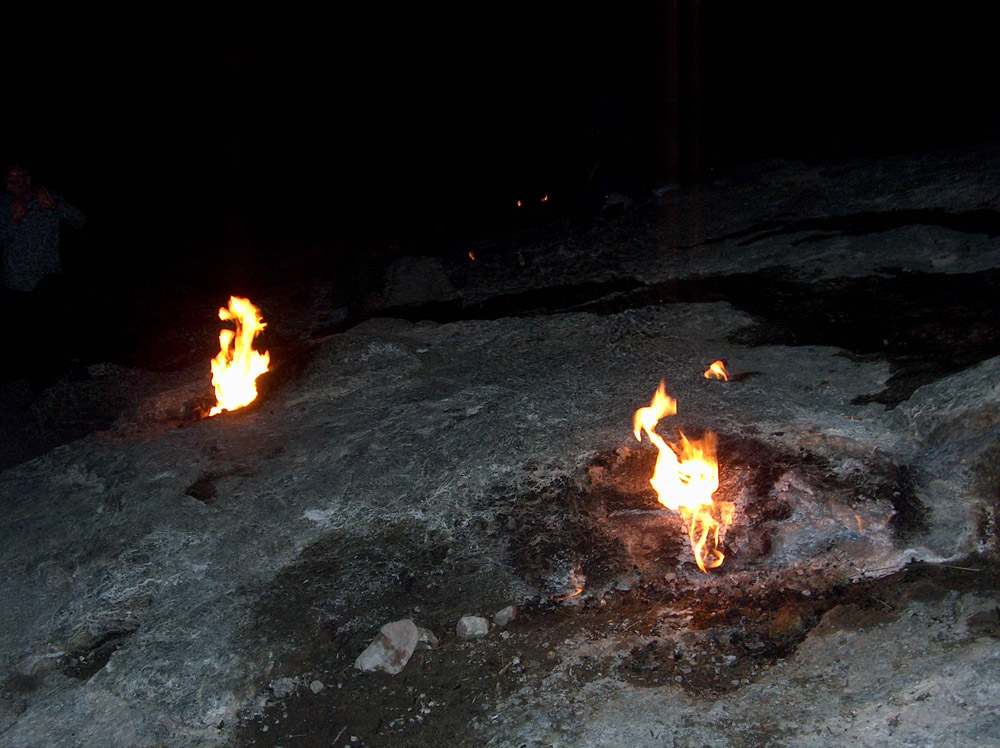
The eternal fires of Chimera in Lycia, modern-day Turkey, where the myth takes place

Pliny the Elder cited Ctesias and quoted Photius identifying the Chimera with an area of permanent gas vents that still may be found by hikers on the Lycian Way in southwest Turkey. Called in Turkish, Yanartaş (flaming rock), the area contains some two dozen vents in the ground, grouped in two patches on the hillside above the Temple of Hephaestus approximately 3 km north of Çıralı, near ancient Olympos, in Lycia. The vents emit burning methane thought to be of metamorphic origin. The fires of these were landmarks in ancient times and were used for navigation by sailors.

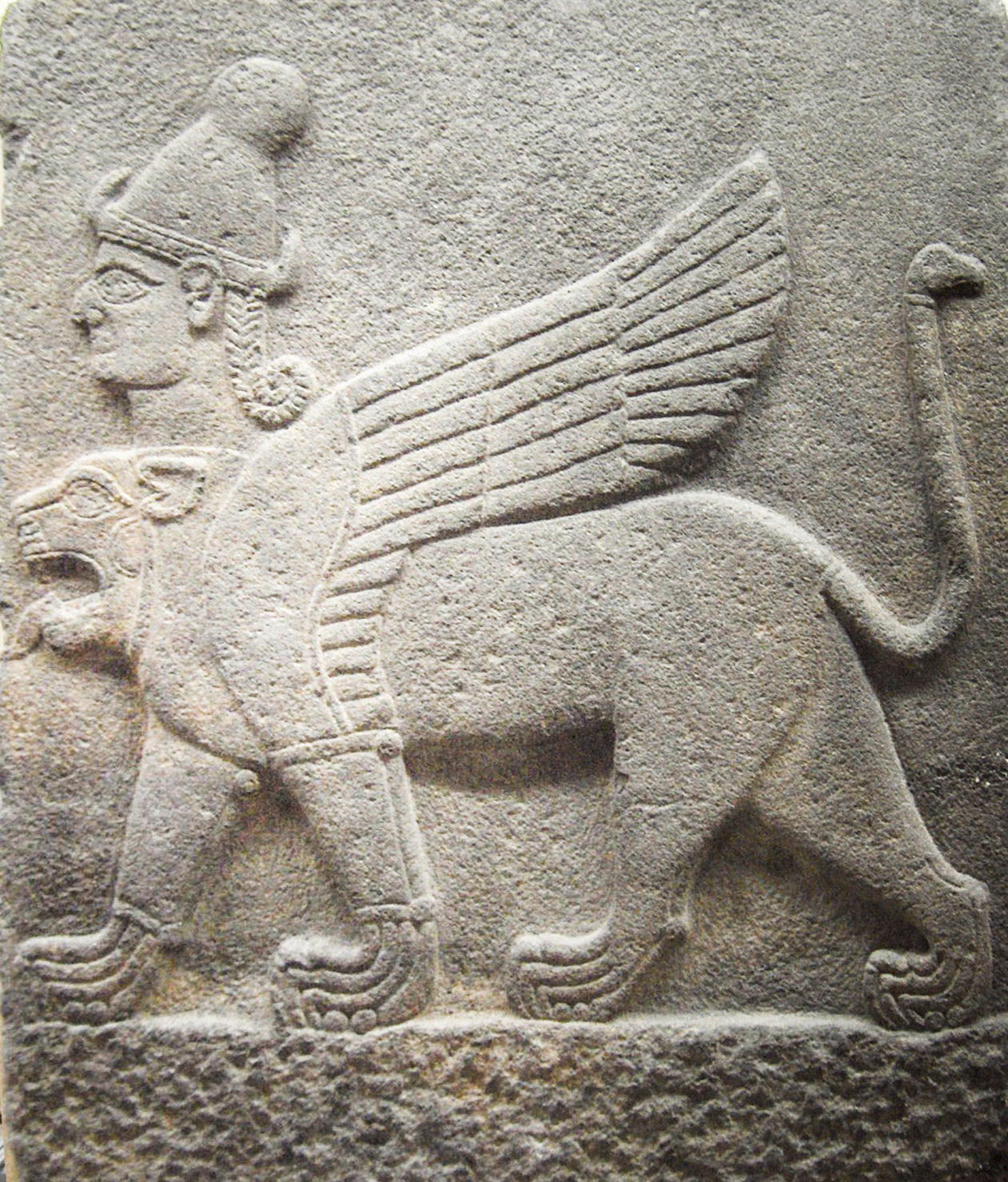
Neo-Hittite Chimera from Karkemish, at the Museum of Anatolian Civilizations

The Neo-Hittite Chimera from Carchemish, dated 850–750 BC, which is now housed in the Museum of Anatolian Civilizations, is believed to be a basis for the Greek legend. It differs, however, from the Greek version in that a winged body of a lioness also has a human head rising from her shoulders.

== Use for Chinese mythological creatures ==
Some western scholars of Chinese art, starting with Victor Segalen, use the word "chimera" generically to refer to winged leonine or mixed species quadrupeds, such as bixie, tianlu, and even qilin.

== In popular culture ==
Chimera usada na heráldica

The term, and often the general concept, has been adopted by various works of popular culture, and chimeras of differing description can be found in contemporary works of fantasy and science fiction.

In Heraldry, the Chimera is described as having the head, mane and legs of a lion, the body of a goat, and the tail of a dragon.

The Chimera was also described as having "the head and breast of a woman, the forepaws of a lion, the body of a goat, the hind legs of a griffin and the tail of a dragon".

== See also ==
- Chimaera – genus of fish named after the mythical creature
- List of hybrid creatures in folklore
- Nue – A Japanese Chimera with the head of a monkey, the body of a tanuki, the legs of a tiger, and a snake-headed tail
