= Idyros =

Ancient city in Anatolia

Coordinates: 36°36′09″N 30°33′35″E

Idyros (Ancient Greek: Ἴδυρης, Latin: Idyrus) was a Greek city in ancient Lycia. Its exact location is uncertain. According to Pseudo-Scylax it was located north of Phaselis.

The site of the town is tentatively located near modern Kemer.
