= Kiriş =

Neighbourhood of Kemer in Antalya Province, Turkey

- Neighbourhood
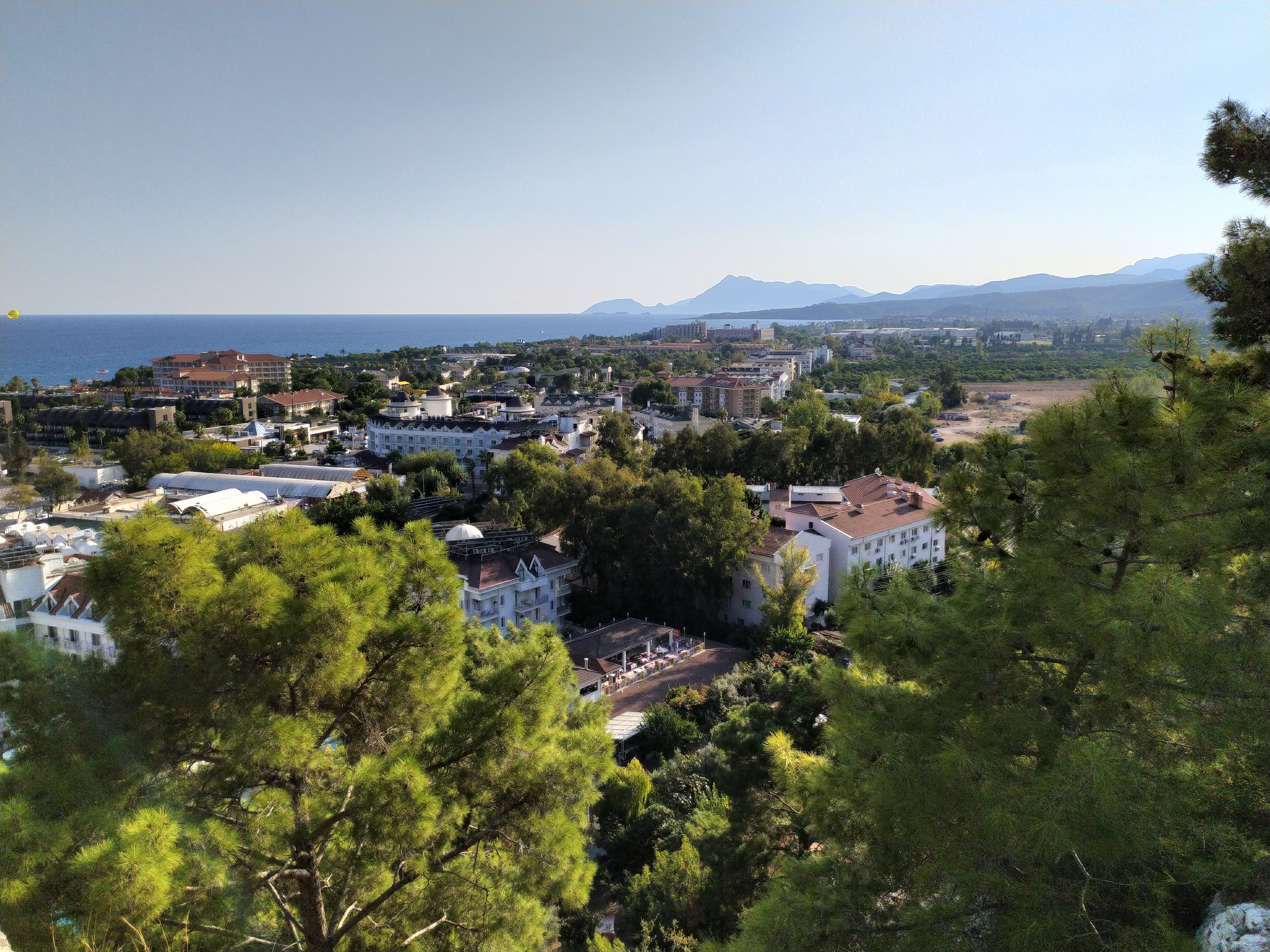

- Location within Turkey
- Coordinates: 36°34′30″N 30°34′50″E
- Country: Turkey
- Province: Antalya
- District: Kemer
- Population (2024): 1,273
- Time zone: UTC+3 (TRT)

Kiriş (Turkish: /ci.ˈɾiʃ/) is a neighbourhood of Kemer, a municipality and district in the Antalya Province of Turkey. As of 2024, the population of Kiriş is 1,273 people. Kiriş is located 5 kilometres (3.1 mi) from Kemer proper, and 65 kilometres (40 mi) from Antalya. During the summer, Kiriş is visited primarily by Russians and Germans. Kiriş offers multiple five-star hotels for the tourists to stay in, and its coastline is covered with orange groves.

The Turkish rally of the World Rally Championship was organized in Kiriş.
