= Ovacık, Kemer =

Ovacık
- Neighbourhood
- Location in Turkey
- Coordinates: 36°38′55″N 30°25′52″E
- Country: Turkey
- Province: Antalya
- District: Kemer
- Population (2022): 149
- Time zone: UTC+3 (TRT)

Ovacık is a neighbourhood of the municipality and district of Kemer, Antalya Province, Turkey. Its population is 149 (2022).
