= Beycik, Kemer =

Beycik
- Neighbourhood
- Location in Turkey
- Coordinates: 36°30′15″N 30°25′27″E
- Country: Turkey
- Province: Antalya
- District: Kemer
- Elevation: 850 m (2,790 ft)
- Population (2022): 531
- Time zone: UTC+3 (TRT)

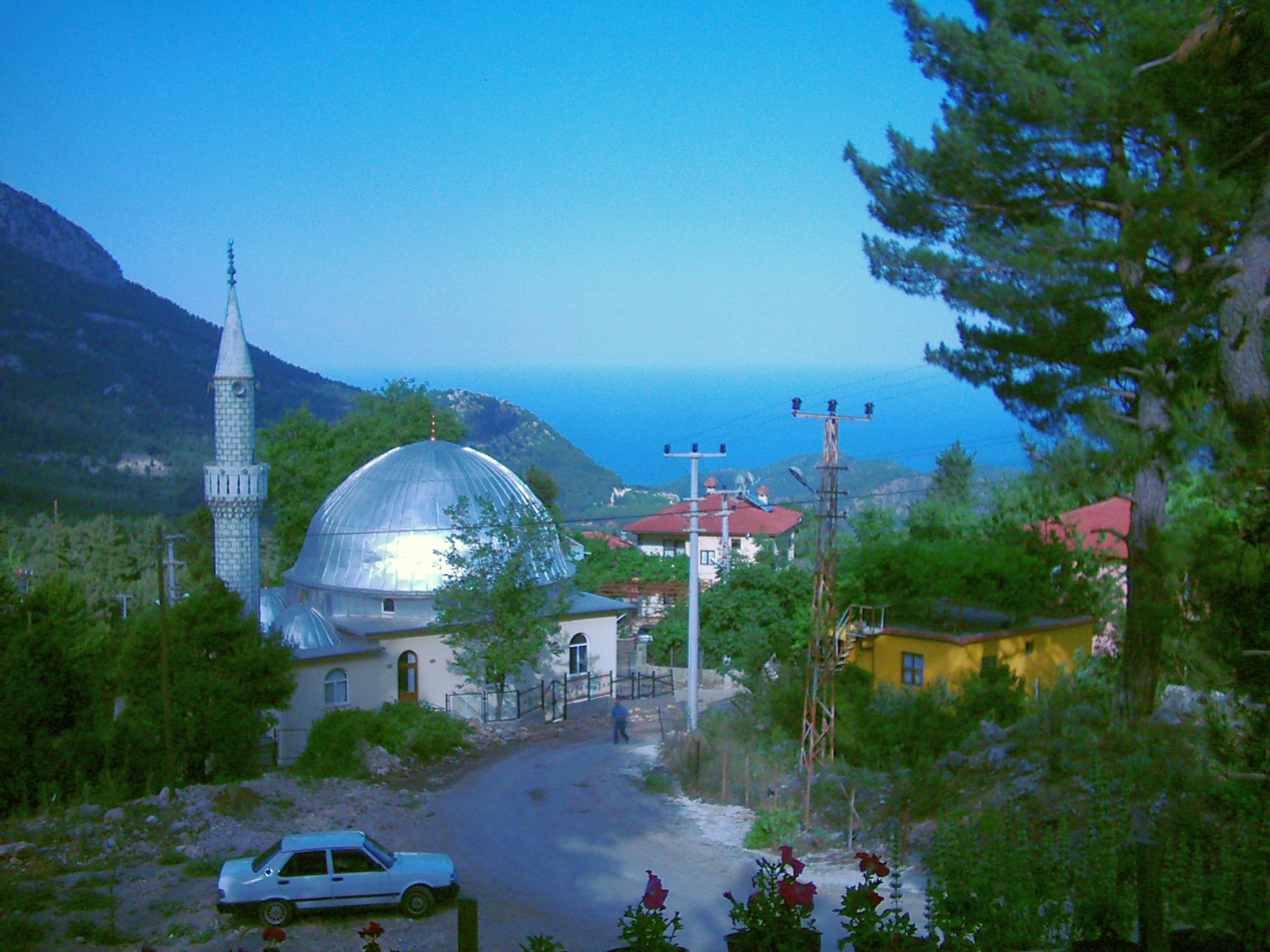
Beycik

Beycik is a neighbourhood of the municipality and district of Kemer, Antalya Province, Turkey. Its population is 531 (2022). It is located southwest of Antalya.

Beycik is situated in the Olympos National Park, in the foothills of Mount Olympos (2,400 m) and at an altitude of 450 m to 1,000 m. Noteworthy tourist attractions in the vicinity are Phaselis and Tekirova. The distance to the city of Antalya is 65 km and to the tourist town of Kemer is 22 km.
