= Beldibi, Kemer =

Beldibi
- Neighbourhood
- Location in Turkey
- Coordinates: 36°43′20″N 30°33′43″E
- Country: Turkey
- Province: Antalya
- District: Kemer
- Population (2022): 3,376
- Time zone: UTC+3 (TRT)

Beldibi is a neighbourhood of the municipality and district of Kemer, Antalya Province, Turkey. Its population is 3,376 (2022).

== Gallery ==
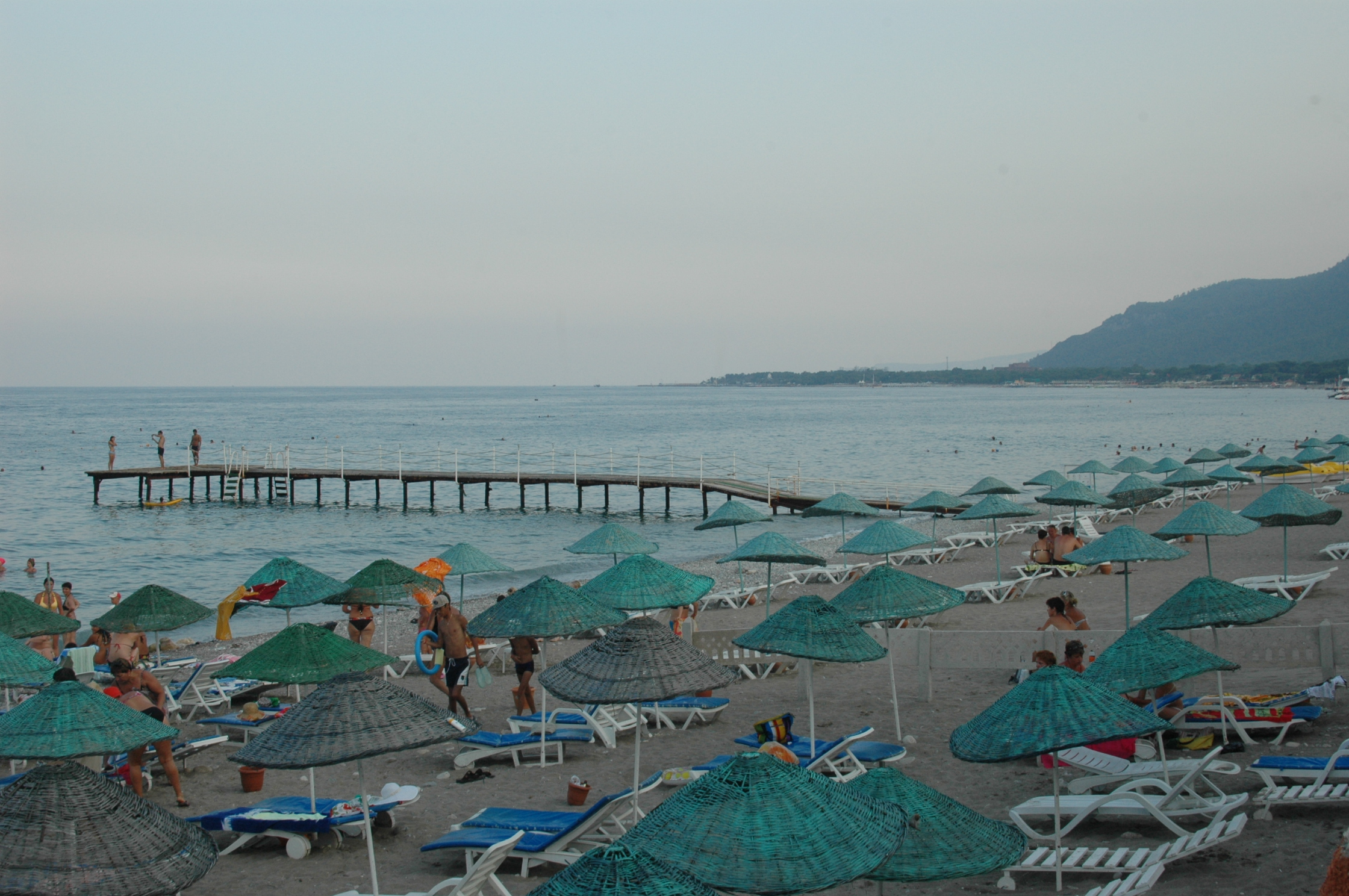
Beldibi beach.

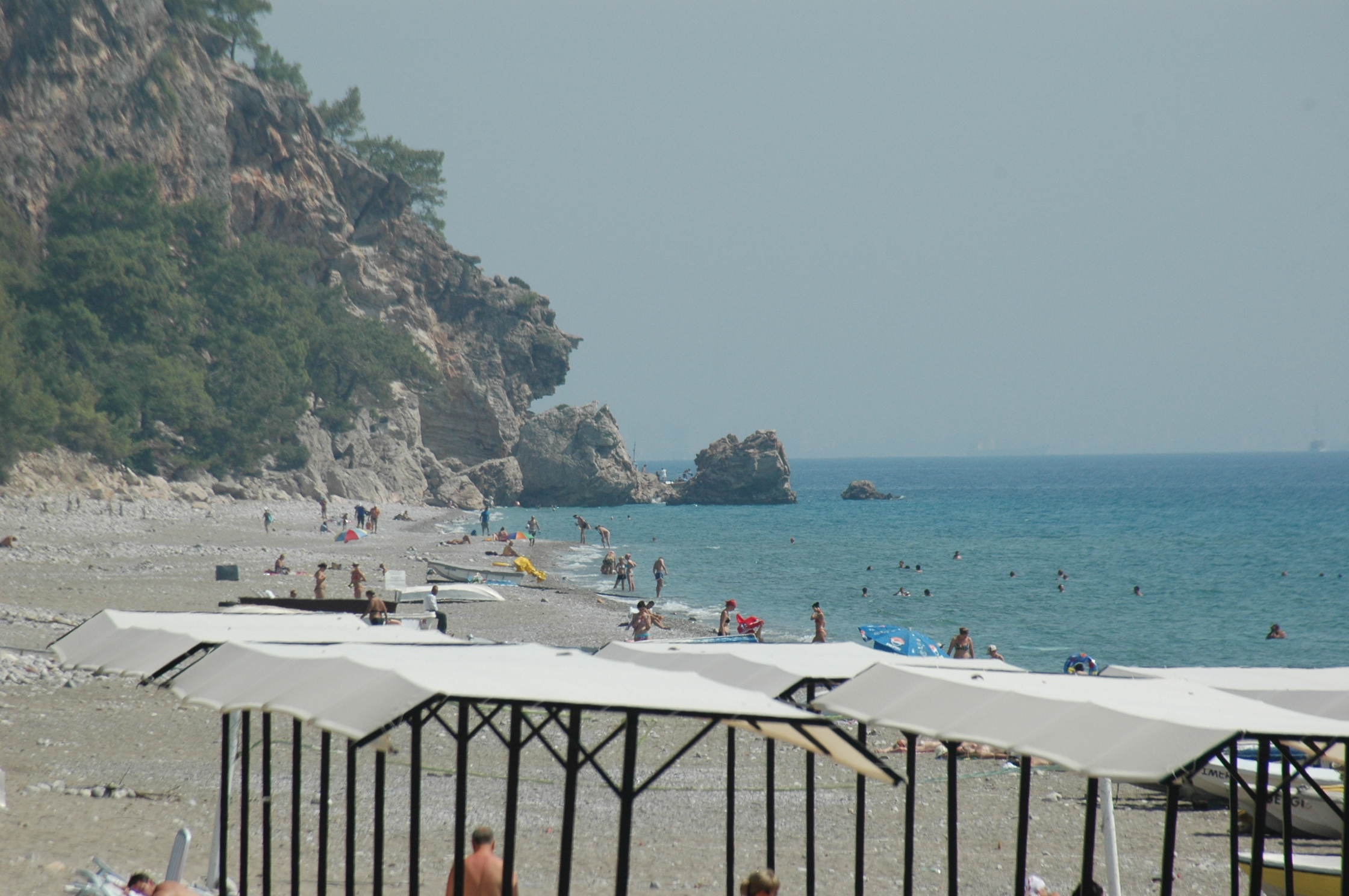
Beldibi beach - Kemer.

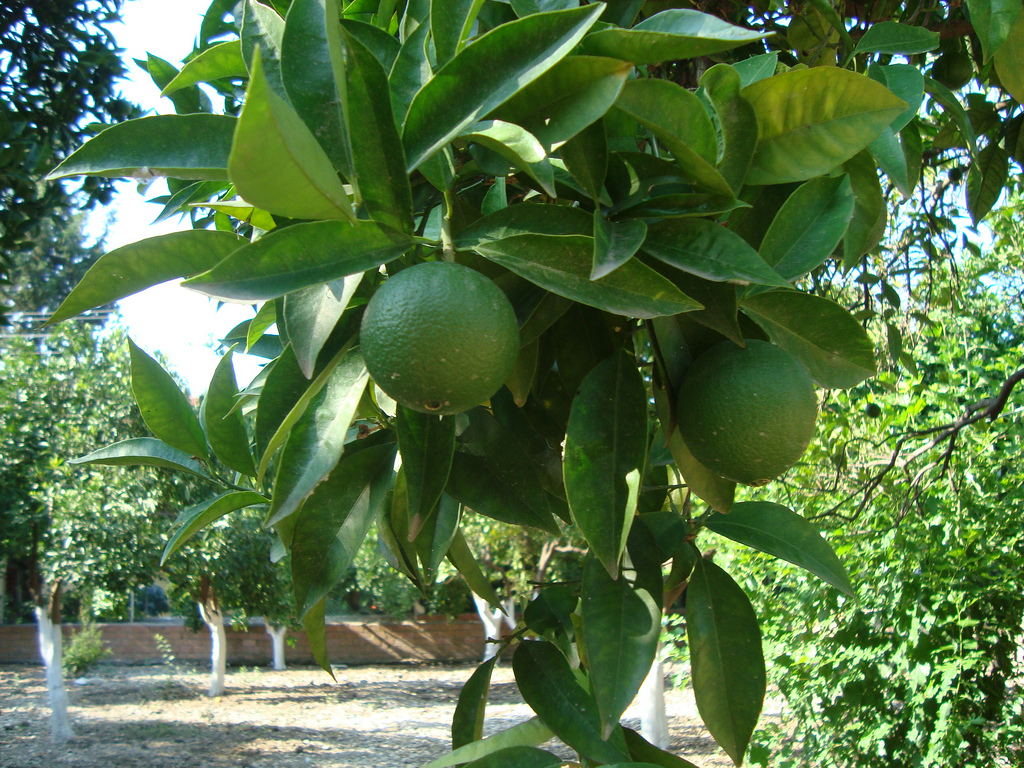
Beldibi orange grove.
