= Mount Chimaera =

Place in ancient Lycia, Anatolia

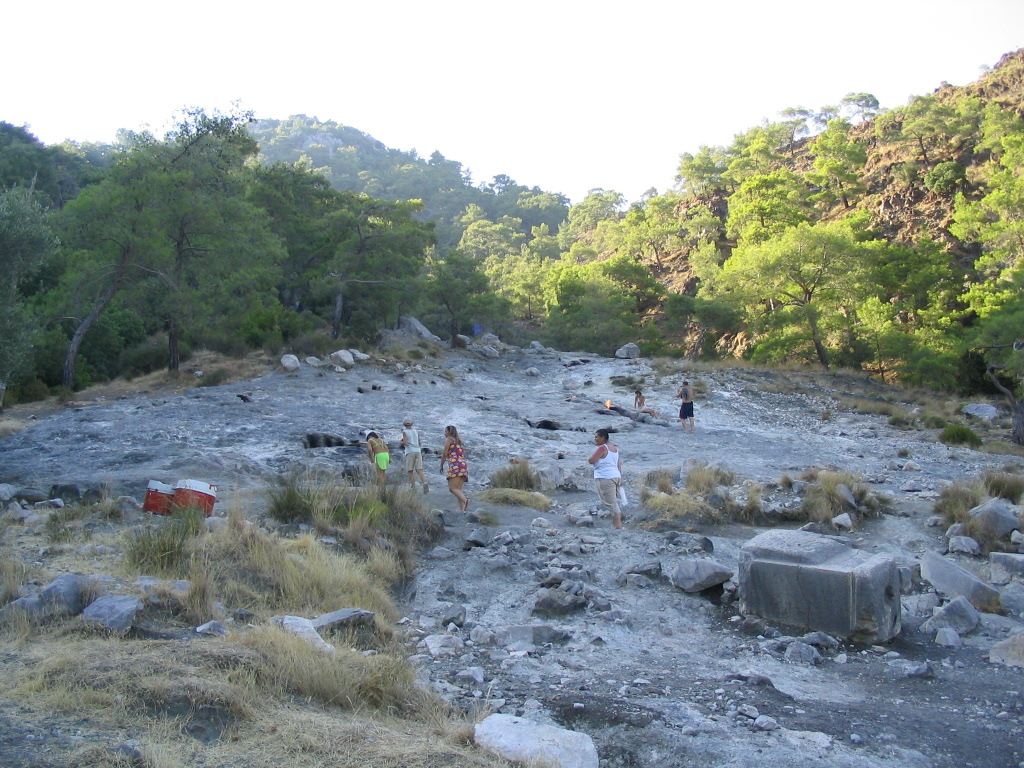
Area near Yanartaş. Some say this geothermically active region was the inspiration for the myth of the Chimera.

Mount Chimaera was the name of a place in ancient Lycia, notable for constantly burning fires. It is thought to be the area called Yanartaş in Turkey, where methane and other gases, such as hydrogen, emerge from the rock and burn. Some ancient sources considered it to be the origin of the myth of the monster called the Chimera, because of similarities described below.

Ctesias is the oldest traceable author to offer this euhemerizing theory. We know of this because of a citation by Pliny the Elder, who in his second book of Historia Naturalis identified the Chimera with the permanent gas vents in Mount Chimaera, in the country of the ancient Lycian city of Phaselis, which he described as being "on fire", adding that it "...indeed burned with a flame that does not die by day or night." Pliny was quoted by Photius and Agricola.

Strabo and Pliny are the only surviving ancient sources who would be expected to discuss a Lycian toponym, but the placename is also attested by Isidore of Seville and Servius, the commentator on the Aeneid. Strabo held the Chimaera to be a ravine on a different mountain in Lycia, placing it unhesitatingly in the vicinity of the Cragus Mountains, the southern part of the present Babadağ, some 75 km due west as the crow flies, and Isidore quotes writers on natural history (see below) that Mount Chimaera was on fire here, had lions and goats there, and was full of snakes over there. Servius goes so far as to arrange these with the lions on the peak of the mountain, pastures full of goats in the middle, and serpents all about the base, thus imitating Homer's description of the monster.

The site was identified by Sir Francis Beaufort in 1811, as the modern Turkish Yanar or Yanartaş, which was described by Thomas Abel Brimage Spratt in his Travels in Lycia, Milyas, and the Cibyratis, in company with the late Rev. E. T. Daniell. The discussion on the connection between the myth and the exact location of Mount Chimera was started by Albert Forbiger in 1844, and George Ewart Bean was of the opinion that the name was allochthonous and could have been transferred here from its original location further west, as cited by Strabo, owing to the presence of the same phenomenon and the fires.

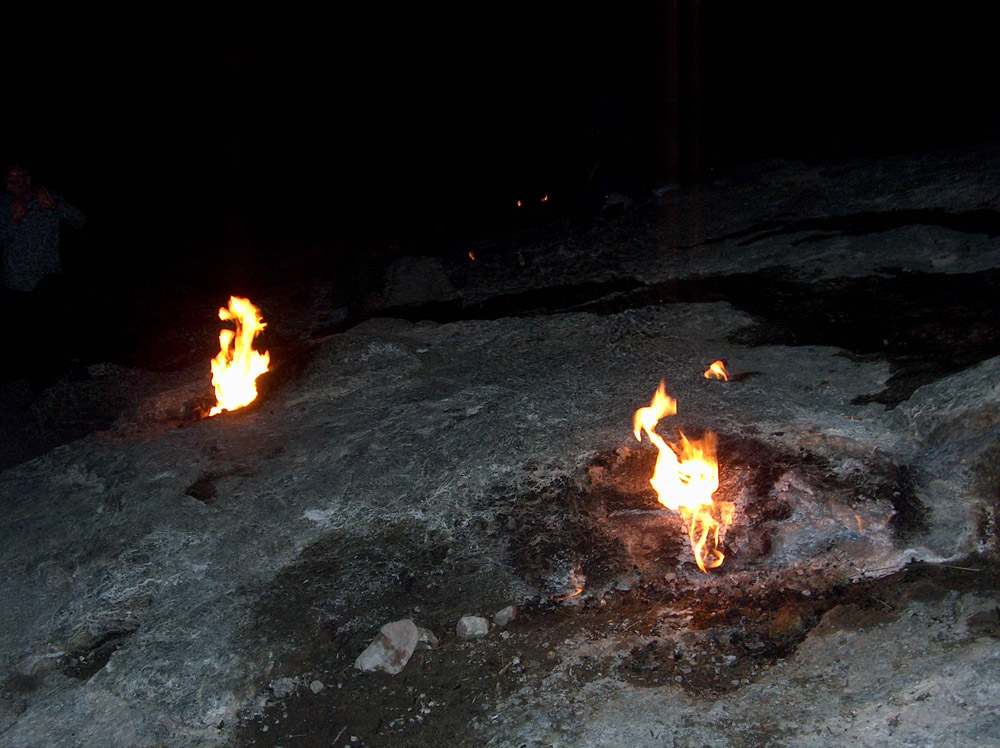
The fires of Yanartaş at night.

== Testimonia ==
- Fingunt et Chimaeram triformem bestiam; ore leono, postremis partibus draco, media caprea. Quam quidam Physiologi non animal, sed Ciliciae montem esse aiunt, quibusdam locis leones and capreas nutrientem, quibusdam ardentem, quibusdam plenum serpentibus. Hunc Bellorophontes habitabilem fecit, unde Chimaeram dicitur occidisse. Isidore of Seville, Etymologiae 11.3.36
  - The Chimera is depicted as a three-formed beast; a lion in front, a python in its hinder parts, goatlike in the middle. Certain writers on natural history say it isn't an animal, but a mountain in Cilicia, which in some places feeds lions and goats, in some burns, in some is full of snakes. Bellerophon made this habitable, whence he is said to have "killed Chimaera".
    - Isidore unetymologically connected Lycia and Cilicia, as below.
- Lycia nuncupata quod ab oriente adjuncta Ciliciae sit. Nam habet ab ortû Ciliciam, ab occasû et meridie mare, a septentrione Cariam. Ibi est mons Chimaera, qui noctibus aestibus ignem exhalat: sicut in Siciliâ Aetna et Vesuvius in Campaniâ. Isidore of Seville, Etymologies 14,3,46.
  - There [in Lycia] is Mount Chimaera, which breathes out fire on summer nights, like Etna in Sicily and Vesuvius in Campania.
- Pliny 2.105 Mayhoff
  - Mount Chimaera (English)
- Pliny 5.43
  - Mount Chimaera (English)
- Pliny 5.53
  - Chimaera as a geographical reference point. (English)
    - "Cape" is a gloss of the translator.
  - Perseus's English version of Pliny differs in chapter numbering; these become 2.110, 5.28, 5.35 resp.
- Servius on Aeneid 6.288.
  - "In fact, there is a Mount Chimaera..."
- Strabo 14.3.5,"a certain ravine, Chimaera, stretching up from the coast." (English)
- Near Adratchan, not far from the ruins of Olympus, a number of rounded serpentine hills rise among the limestone, and some of them bear up masses of that rock. At the junction of one of these masses of scaglia with the serpentine, is the Yanar, famous as the Chimæra of the ancients, rediscovered in modern times by Captain Beaufort. It is nothing more than a stream of inflammable gas issuing from a cavern, such as is seen in several places among the Apennines. The serpentine immediately around the flame is burnt and ashy, but this is only for a foot or two, the immediate neighborhood of the Yanar presenting the same aspect as it wore in the days of Seneca, who writes "Laeta itaque regio est et herbida, nil flammis adurentibus" Letters 79,3 Such is the Chimæra—
  ...flammis que armata chimæra*—

deprived of all its terrors. It is still, however, visited as a lion by both Greeks and Turks, who make use of its classic flames to cook kebobs for their dinners. [Footnote: *Virgil, Æ, vi. 288] Spratt, op. cit. (London, 1847) Vol. II, p.181-2

- In Lycia regio notissima est (Hephaestion incolae vocant), foratum pluribus locis solum, quod sine ullo nascentium damno ignis innoxius circumit. Laeta itaque regio est et herbida, nihil flammis adurentibus sed tantum vi remissa ac languida refulgentibus. Seneca Epistles 79, 3

== See also ==
- Çıralı
- Phaselis
- Lycia
- Kemer
- Turkish Riviera
