= Göynük Canyon =

Canyon in the Antalya Province of Turkey

- Göynük Kanyonu
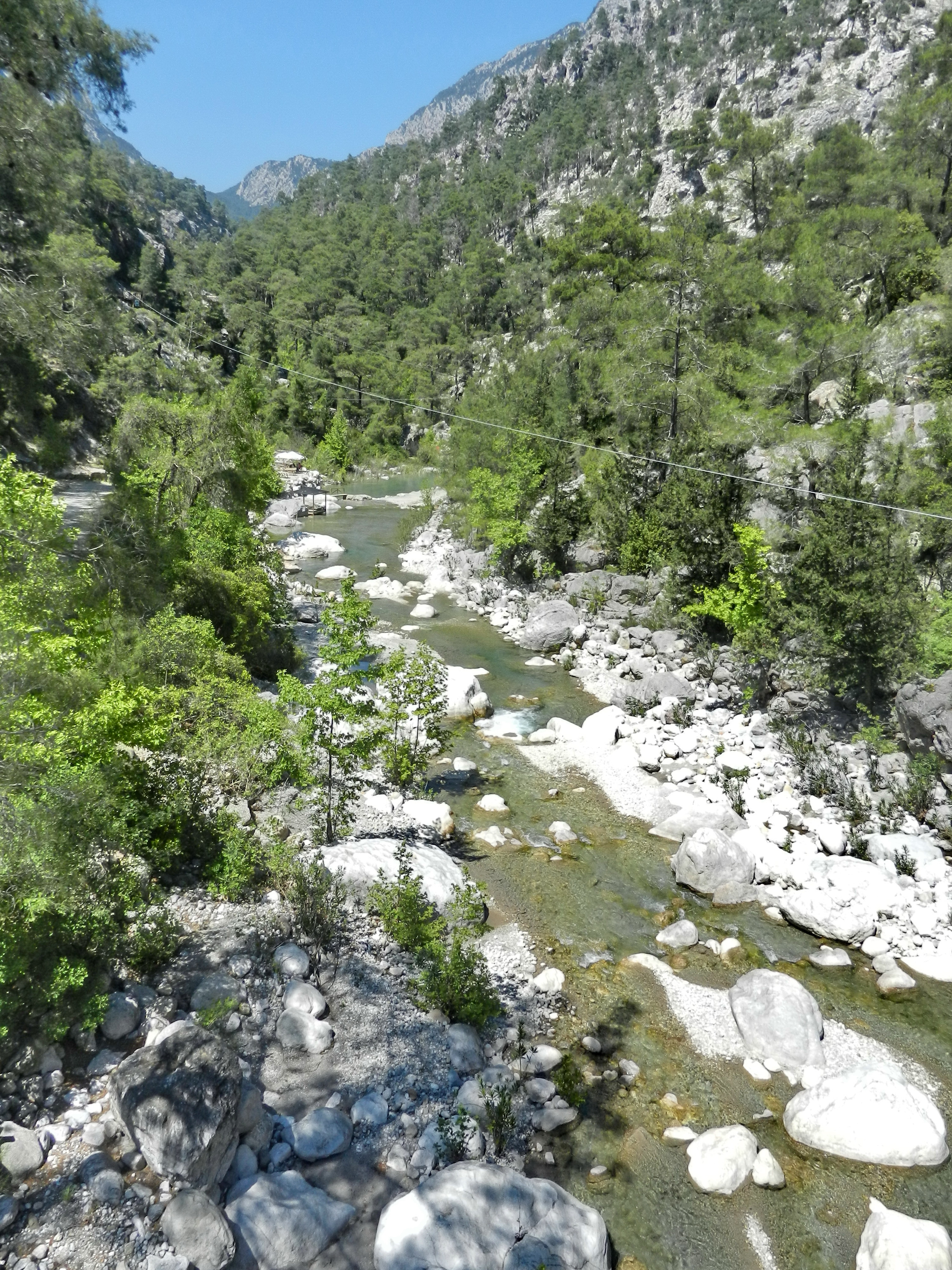
- A view from Göynük Canyon, Turkey.

- Location within Turkey
- Length: 4.5 km (2.8 mi)

Geography
- Location: Kemer, Antalya Province, Turkey
- Coordinates: 36°40′58″N 30°31′59″E
- Interactive map of Göynük Canyon

Göynük Canyon (Turkish: Göynük Kanyonu) is a canyon in the Antalya Province of southwestern Turkey.

The canyon is located inside the Beydağları Coastal National Park, about 4 km (2.5 mi) to Göynük village of Kemer district in Antalya Province. The 4.5 km (2.8 mi)-long canyon is an important part of the long distance trail Lycian Way. There are waterfalls and ponds inside the canyon. It offers outdoor recreational activities such as hiking and trekking on a daily base. By April 2009, touristic facilities were opened in the canyon, which provide security equipment, guidance service, and food.

== Access ==
The canyon is accessible by an about 45-minute walk from Göynük or by ride on any off-road vehicle or motorcycle, which can be rented in the village. In addition, buses depart from Göynük to the canyon on an hourly base. The canyon entrance is then reached after hiking a 2–3 km (1.2–1.9 mi) mountainous trail. In the 2022 season, entry to the park cost from €17 (including pontoon crossing), to €23 (including canyoning). The fenced canyon closes at 19:00 hours local time.
