= Göynük, Kemer =

Göynük
- Neighbourhood
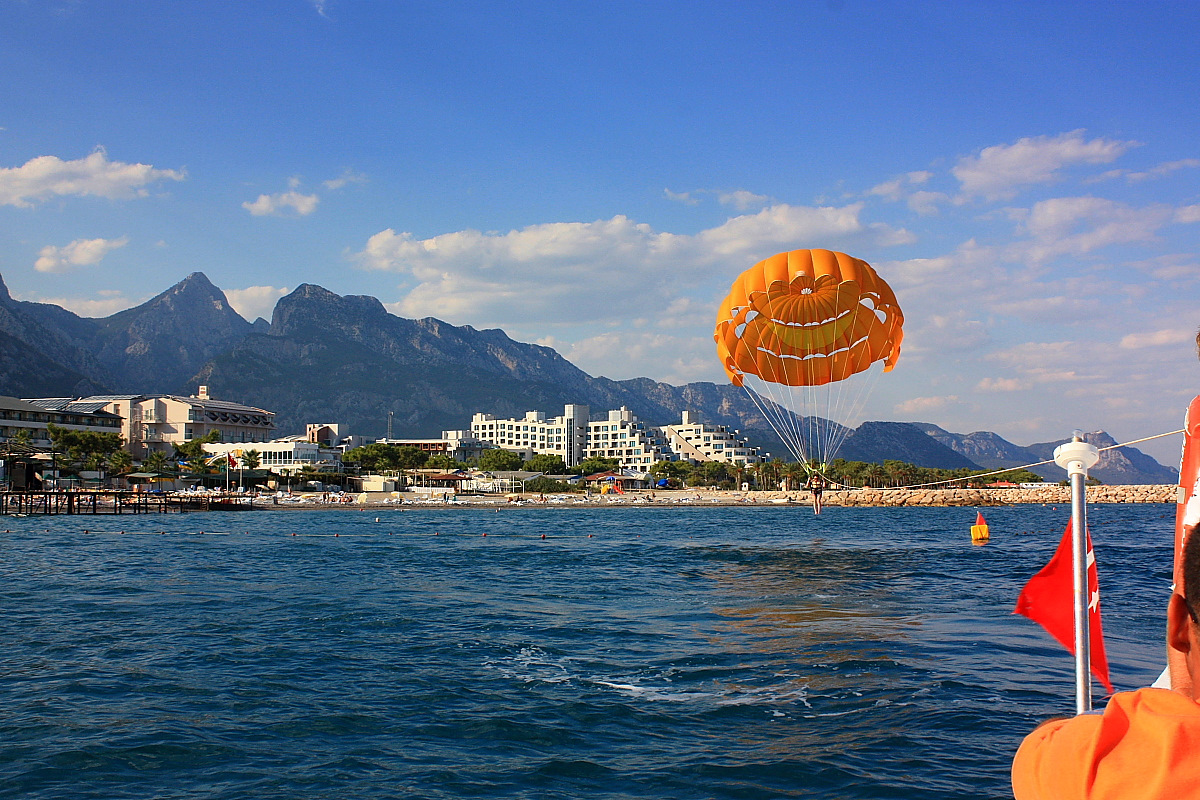
- A view of Göynük from the sea.

- Location within Turkey
- Coordinates: 36°39′36″N 30°33′00″E
- Country: Turkey
- Province: Antalya
- District: Kemer
- Population (2022): 7,868
- Time zone: UTC+3 (TRT)

Göynük is a neighbourhood of the municipality and district of Kemer, Antalya Province, Turkey. Its population is 7,868 (2022). Before the 2013 reorganisation, it was a town (belde). The town is inhabited by Tahtacı.

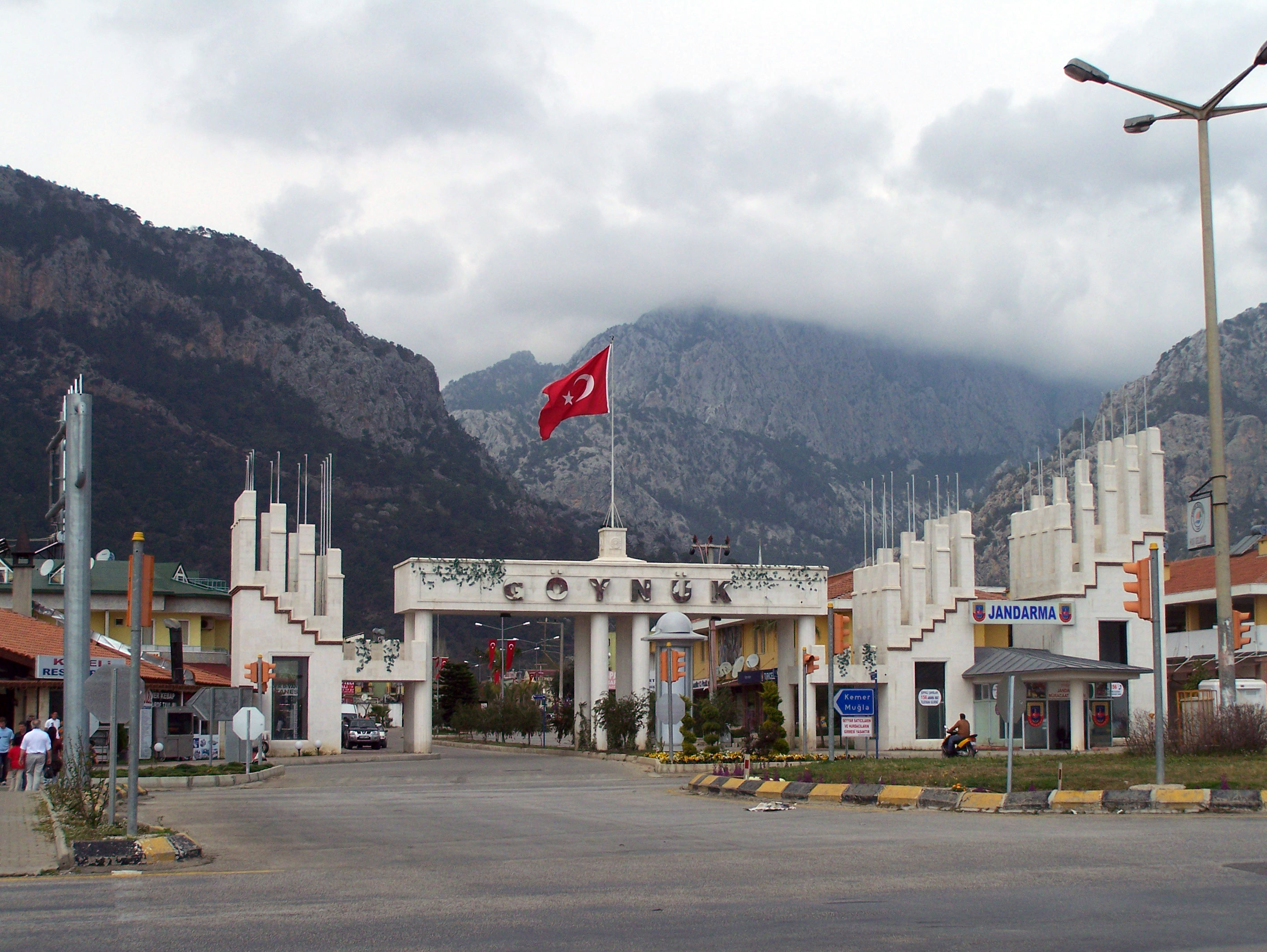
Entrance to Göynük

== See also ==
- Göynük Canyon
