= Kemer =

- District and municipality
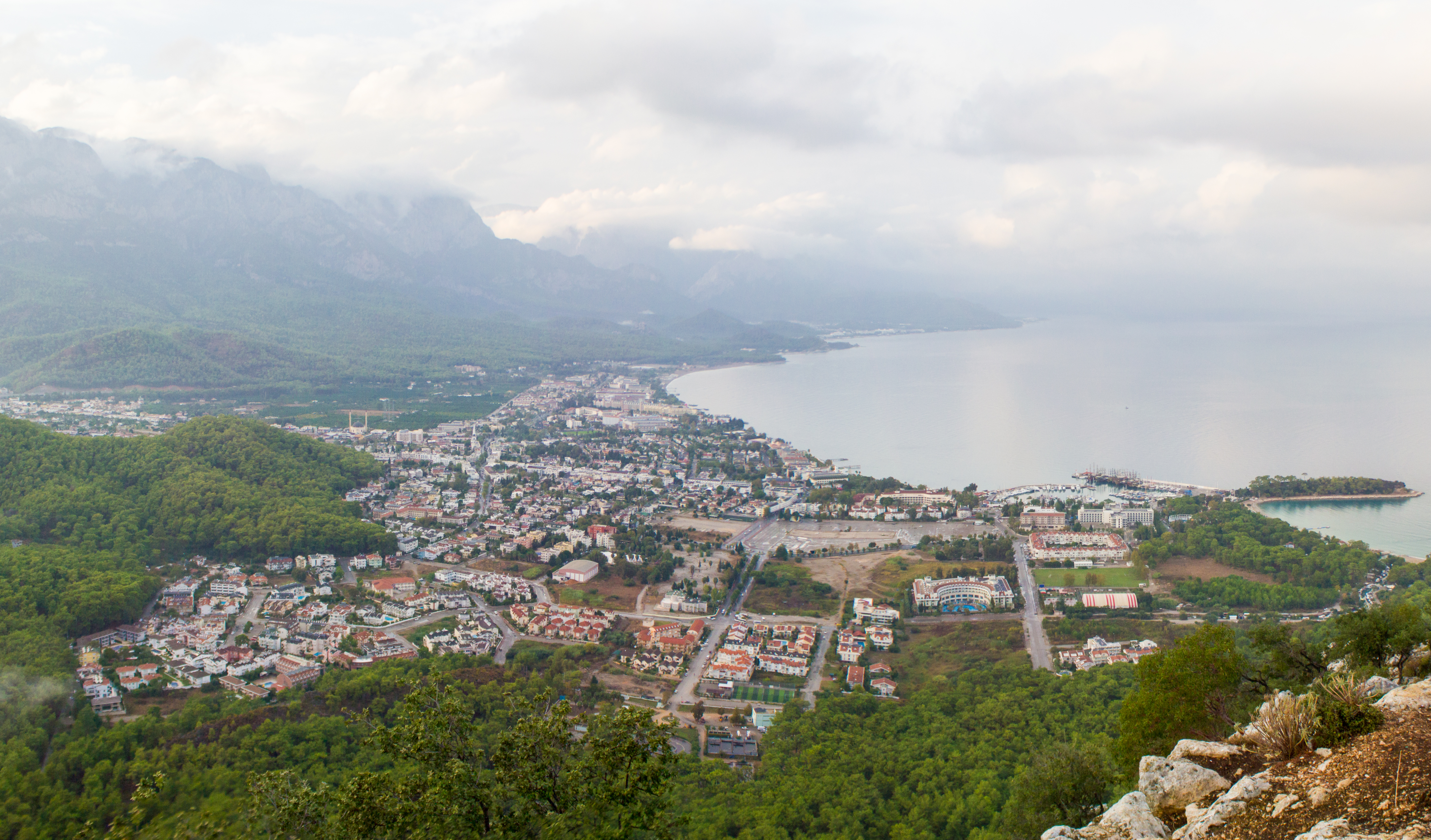
- An aerial view of Kemer

- Logo

- Map showing Kemer District in Antalya Province

- Location within Turkey
- Coordinates: 36°36′N 30°33′E
- Country: Turkey
- Province: Antalya

Government
  - Mayor: Necati Topaloğlu (CHP)
- Area: 412 km^{2} (159 sq mi)
- Elevation: 4 m (13 ft)
- Population (2022): 49,383
  - Density: 120/km^{2} (310/sq mi)
- Time zone: UTC+3 (TRT)
- Area code: 0242
- Website: www.kemer.bel.tr

Kemer is a seaside resort, municipality and district of Antalya Province, Turkey. Its area is 412 km^{2}, and its population is 49,383 (2022). It is on the Mediterranean coast, 43 km (27 mi) west of the city of Antalya, on the Turkish Riviera.

Kemer is on the Gulf of Antalya, 53 km (33 mi) of sea coast with the skirts of the western Taurus Mountains behind. The coast has the typical Mediterranean hot, dry weather and warm sea. Until the early 1980s this was a quiet rural district, but today the town of Kemer and coastal villages in the district play a very important part in tourism in Turkey.

== History ==
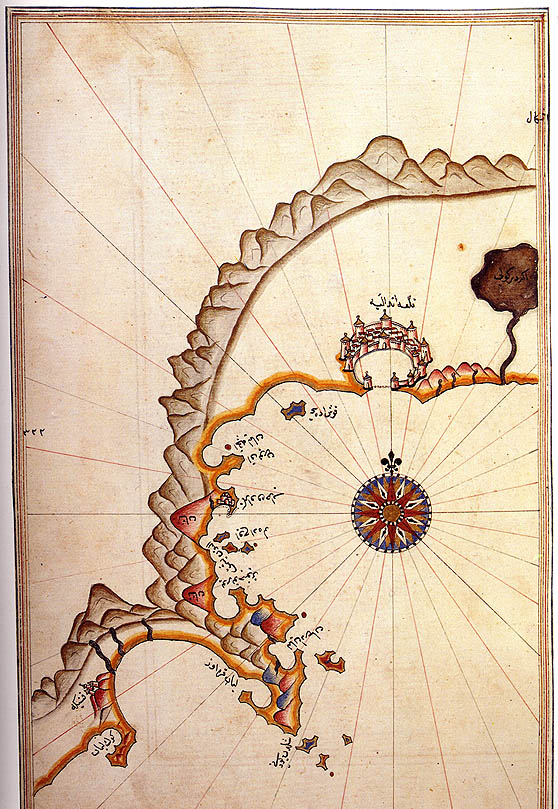
Historic map of Kemer by Piri Reis

Kemer was the ancient Greek city of Idyros, member of the Lycian League, which after the Ottoman era was called Eski Köy (Old Village) until a 23 km (14 mi) long stone wall was built in 1916–1917 to channel the mountain stream water and protect the town from flooding, which until then had been a persistent problem. The name Kemer refers to those walls.

Before the population exchange between Greece and Turkey, Greek families lived in the area with the Turks of the area peacefully coexisting. A water mill still exists in the village of Aslanbucak that used to belong to the Greeks of the village of Kemer and Aslanbucak, but the mill is currently located in private property.

Until the 1960s there was no road connection and the district was accessible only by boat. Then a road was built and from the 1980s onwards this was followed by a great investment in infrastructure, planned by the state and funded by the World Bank, aimed at developing a large tourist industry.

== Demographics ==
The municipality is divided into 12 neighbourhoods, shown in the table below with populations:

Neighbourhood	Population (2022)
Arslanbucak	11,795
Beldibi	3,376
Beycik	531
Çamyuva	6,067
Göynük	7,868
Kiriş	1,093
Kuzdere	5,941
Merkez	4,962
Ovacık	149
Tekirova	3,044
Ulupınar	1,315
Yenimahalle	3,242
Total	49,383

== Economy ==
The economy of Kemer district is mostly based on tourism. In the district, which has been declared a first-degree tourism area, there are generally touristic businesses on the coast. Especially orange, lemon and tangerine are grown in the region where agriculture and fruit growing. Recently, pomegranate cultivation has also become widespread.

== Healthcare ==
Health services in Kemer, Antalya have been developed to meet the needs of both locals and tourists. In Kemer, there are public hospitals as well as private hospitals and clinics. These healthcare facilities offer a variety of services, such as emergency services, outpatient clinics, diagnostic and treatment units.

== Tourism in Kemer ==
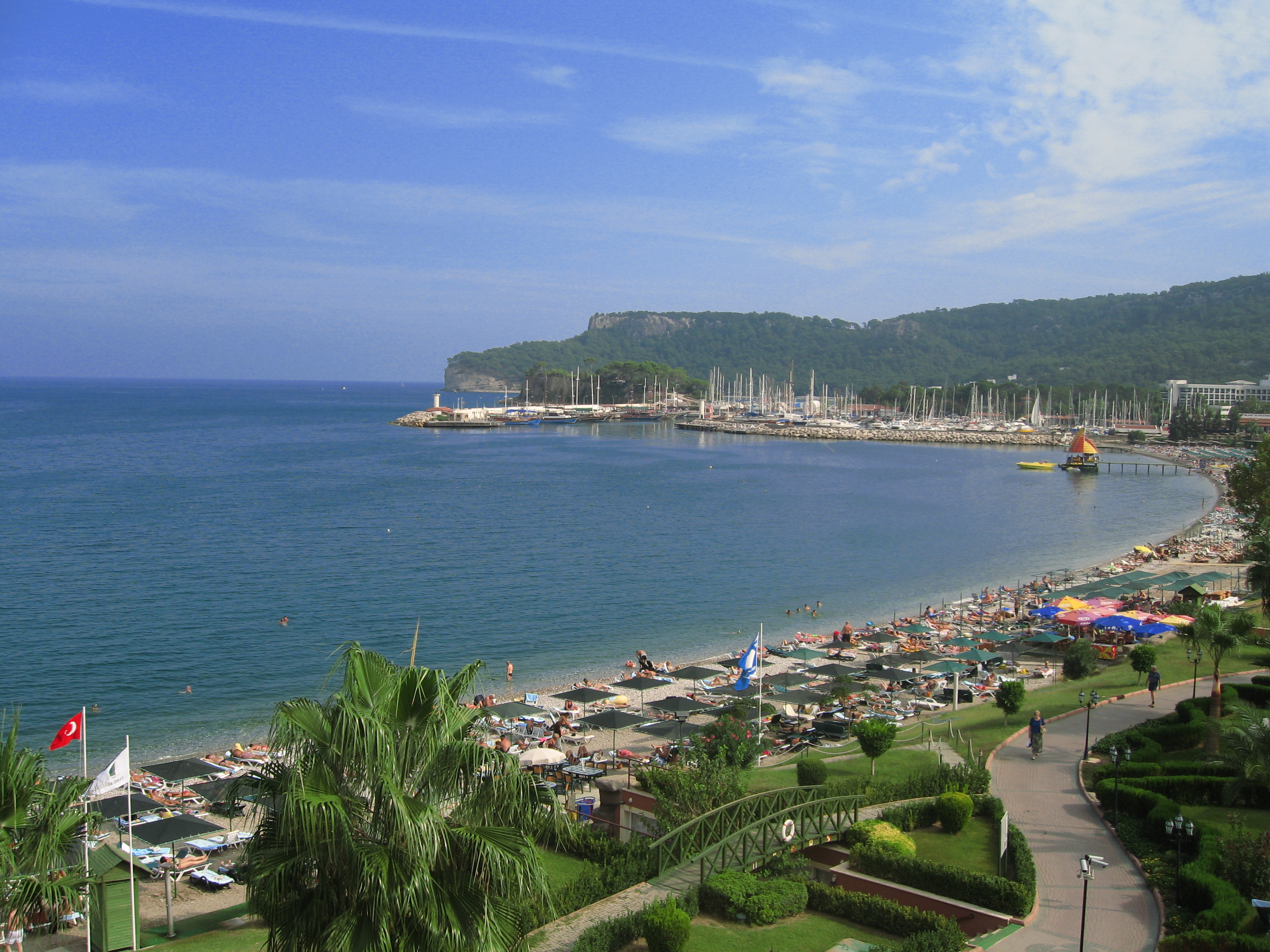
Beaches and marina of Kemer near Antalya on the Turkish Riviera

One of the major attractions of Kemer is its natural environment, including the sea, mountains and pine forests. The shore from Beldibi to Tekirova consists of a number of beaches in bays of various sizes, mostly stoney rather than sand.

Supported by transport and communication links, and related municipal services, Kemer has a large proportion of the hotel bed capacity of the Antalya region, and attracts visitors from countries such as Germany, the Netherlands, and in recent years families from Russia. Many of the visitors come as part of low-cost all-inclusive package deals but tourism is still the mainstay of the local economy. There are so many visitors that most shops in Kemer are set up to sell things like leather jackets to overseas visitors, and trade in the euro as well as the Turkish lira.

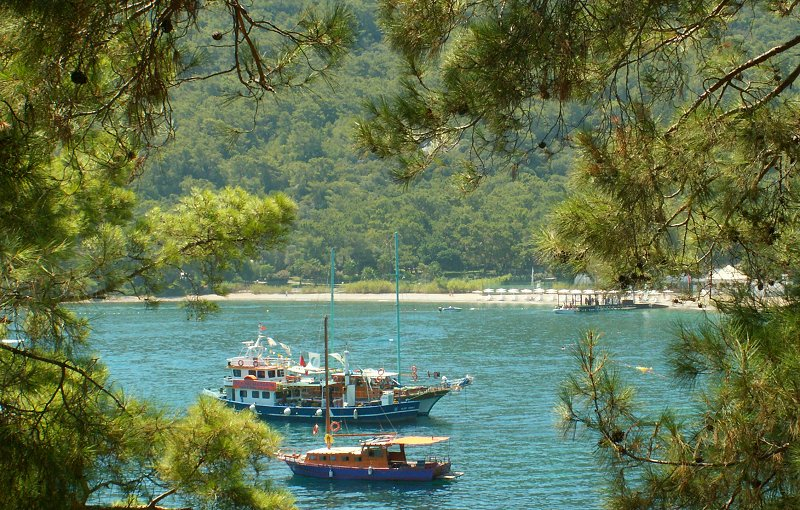
Moonlight Beach near Kemer

Kemer's 320 berth marina offers several restaurants for the tourists as well as being a wintering-over marina for liveaboard sailors from the US, England and other parts of Europe.

Göynük (Goynuk) Canyon, Ulupınar, Olympos, Chimaera, Phaselis, Three Islands and Eco Park are the touristic sites of the Kemer area.

The town of Kemer has a number of clubs, bars and restaurants, blue flag beaches and a 320 capacity yacht marina. Coastal villages include Beldibi, Kiriş, Çayova, Aslanbucak, Kuzdere, Beycik, Çamyuva, Göynük, and Çıralı.

Annual events in the area include art exhibitions in Phaselis, boat races, WRC (World Rally Championship), Turkey Offshore Championship, Turkey Motocross Championship, Phaselis Art Festival, and Kemer Carnival. International pop stars and DJs, such as Tarkan and DJ Tiesto, give summer concerts on this coast.

The Presidential Cycling Tour of Turkey (Turkish: Cumhurbaşkanlığı Bisiklet Turu) is a professional road bicycle racing stage race held each spring.

In recent years there is a rising number of outdoor enthusiasts visiting Kemer for trekking the Lycian Way and for mountain biking.

== Climate ==
Kemer has a hot Mediterranean climate with very hot, long and dry summers with cool, rainy winters. In the height of summer temperatures frequently exceed 40 °C (104 °F).

Climate data for Kemer
Month	Jan	Feb	Mar	Apr	May	Jun	Jul	Aug	Sep	Oct	Nov	Dec	Year
Record high °C (°F)	22 (72)	23 (73)	28 (82)	34 (93)	39 (102)	45 (113)	45 (113)	44 (111)	42 (108)	38 (100)	34 (93)	26 (79)	45 (113)
Mean daily maximum °C (°F)	14 (57)	15 (59)	19 (66)	23 (73)	28 (82)	33 (91)	35 (95)	36 (97)	34 (93)	28 (82)	22 (72)	16 (61)	25 (77)
Mean daily minimum °C (°F)	5 (41)	6 (43)	8 (46)	12 (54)	15 (59)	19 (66)	22 (72)	22 (72)	19 (66)	15 (59)	11 (52)	6 (43)	13 (56)
Record low °C (°F)	−8 (18)	−4 (25)	0 (32)	−1 (30)	5 (41)	1 (34)	13 (55)	13 (55)	11 (52)	2 (36)	1 (34)	−4 (25)	−8 (18)
Average precipitation mm (inches)	108 (4.3)	89 (3.5)	100 (3.9)	98 (3.9)	87 (3.4)	58 (2.3)	21 (0.8)	18 (0.7)	27 (1.1)	58 (2.3)	68 (2.7)	125 (4.9)	857 (33.8)
Average rainy days	11	10	9	8	6	3	1	1	2	6	8	12	77
Source 1: Weatherbase
Source 2: Weather2

== Transport ==
Kemer Bus Terminal, which was put into operation in 1990, has facilitated the transportation of the district. There are bus services to Kemer Bus Terminal from almost every city in Turkey. There are regular shuttles from the surrounding districts to Kemer Bus Station every day.

== Places of interest ==
=== Sites of natural interest ===
- Adrasan Bay - 2 kilometres of beach
- The Çıralı village and 4 km (2 mi) beach. Used for nature walks and sections of the Lycian Way.
- Üç Adalar (Three Islands) - visited by scuba divers
- Göynük Canyon
- İkiz Kayalar (Twin Rocks)
- The village of Ulupınar, with its mountain spring water
- There are a number of caves including Beldibi, and the Molla hole in the east face of Tahtalı mountain.
- The Taurus Mountains offering hiking or tours with SUVs
- The 2069 ± 500 years old oriental pane can be found in Gedelme village.

=== Historical sites ===
- Chimaera - the natural burning rock of Greek mythology
- The ancient cities of Phaselis and Olympos
- The town of Kemer itself has some remains of antique Idryos, a Byzantine church and a Seljuk Turkish hunting lodge.

== International relations ==
Kemer hosted the 2007 World Youth Chess Championship

Kemer is twinned with

- Schwabach, Germany (since 1998)
- Lapta, Northern Cyprus (since 2012)

== Gallery ==
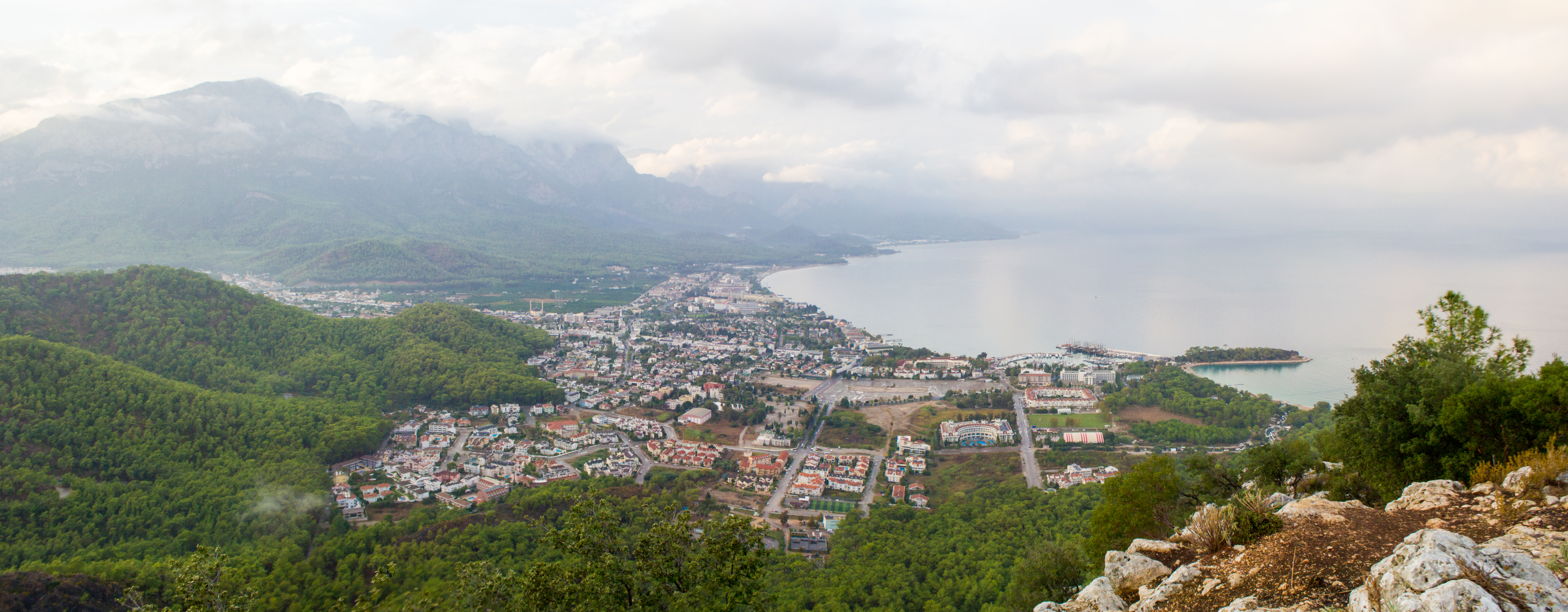
View of the city from a height of 310 meters

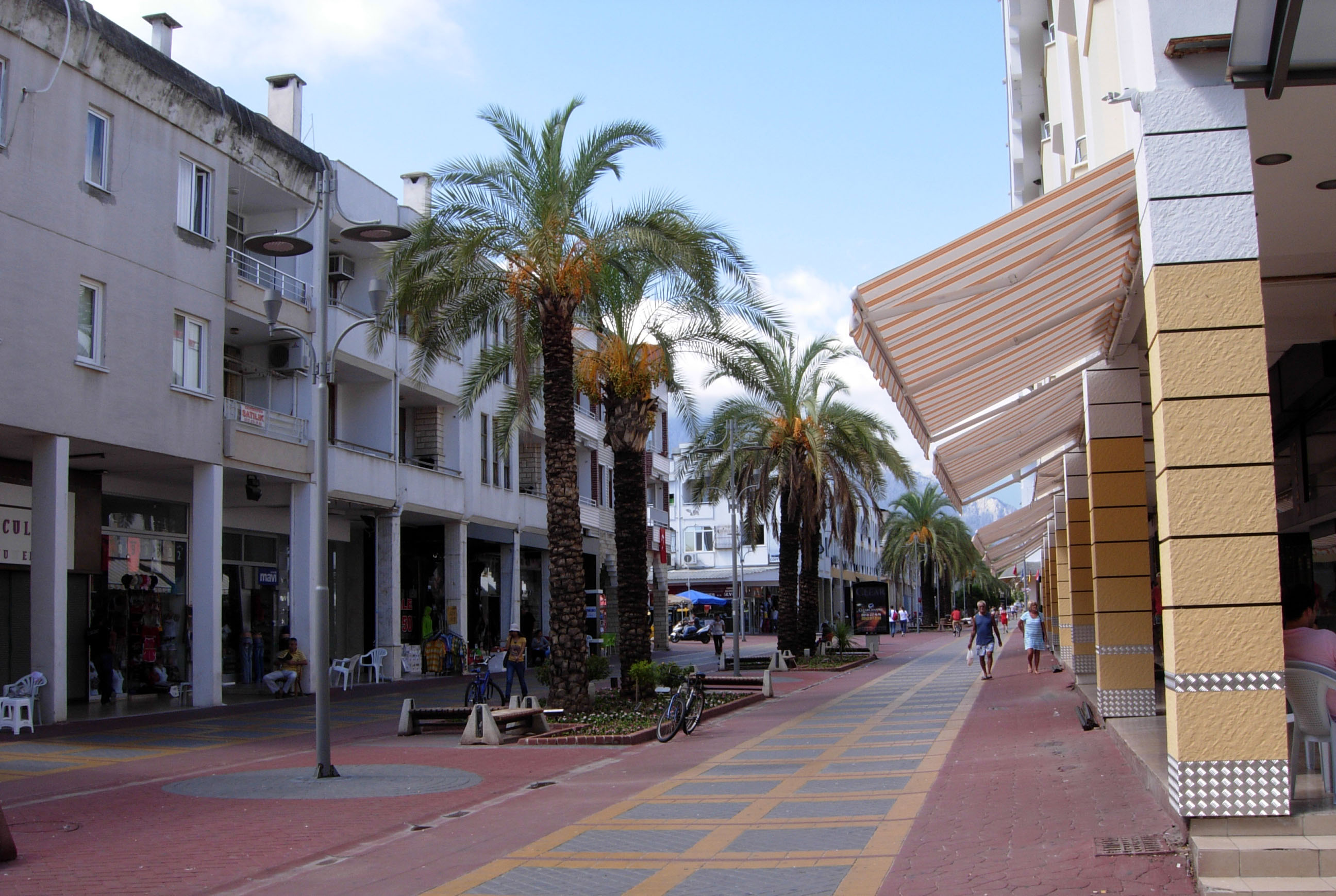
City street

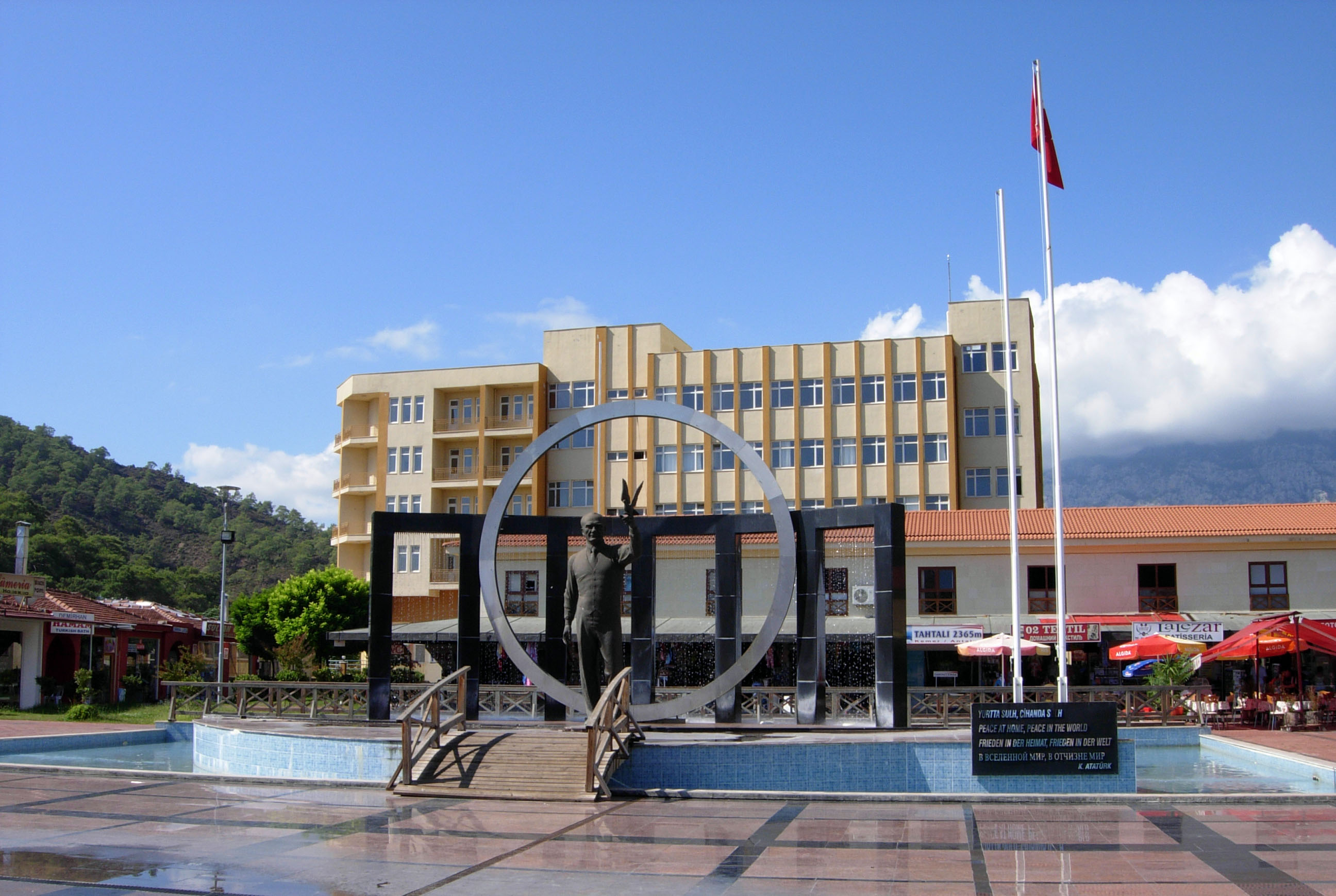
City square

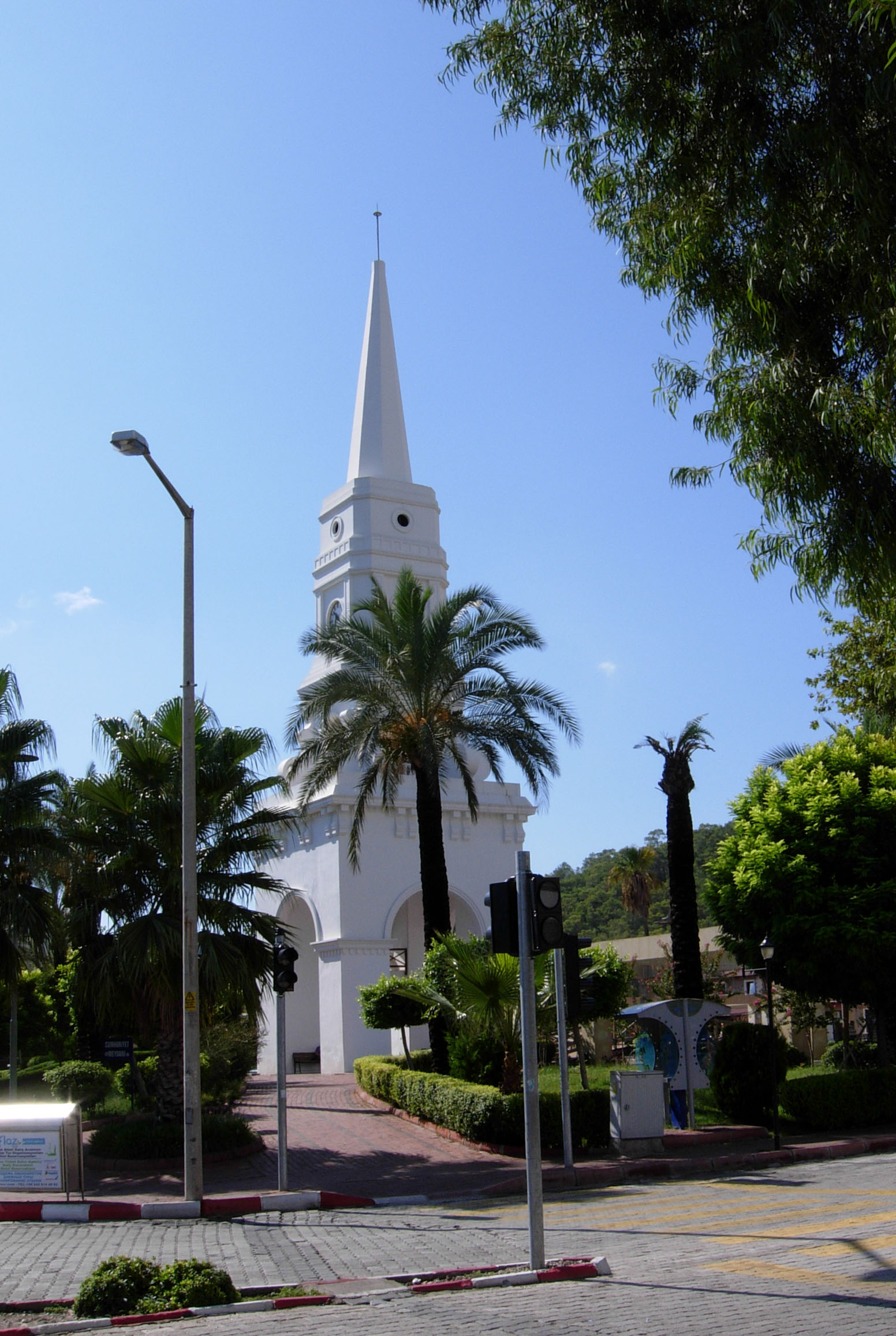
Clock Tower

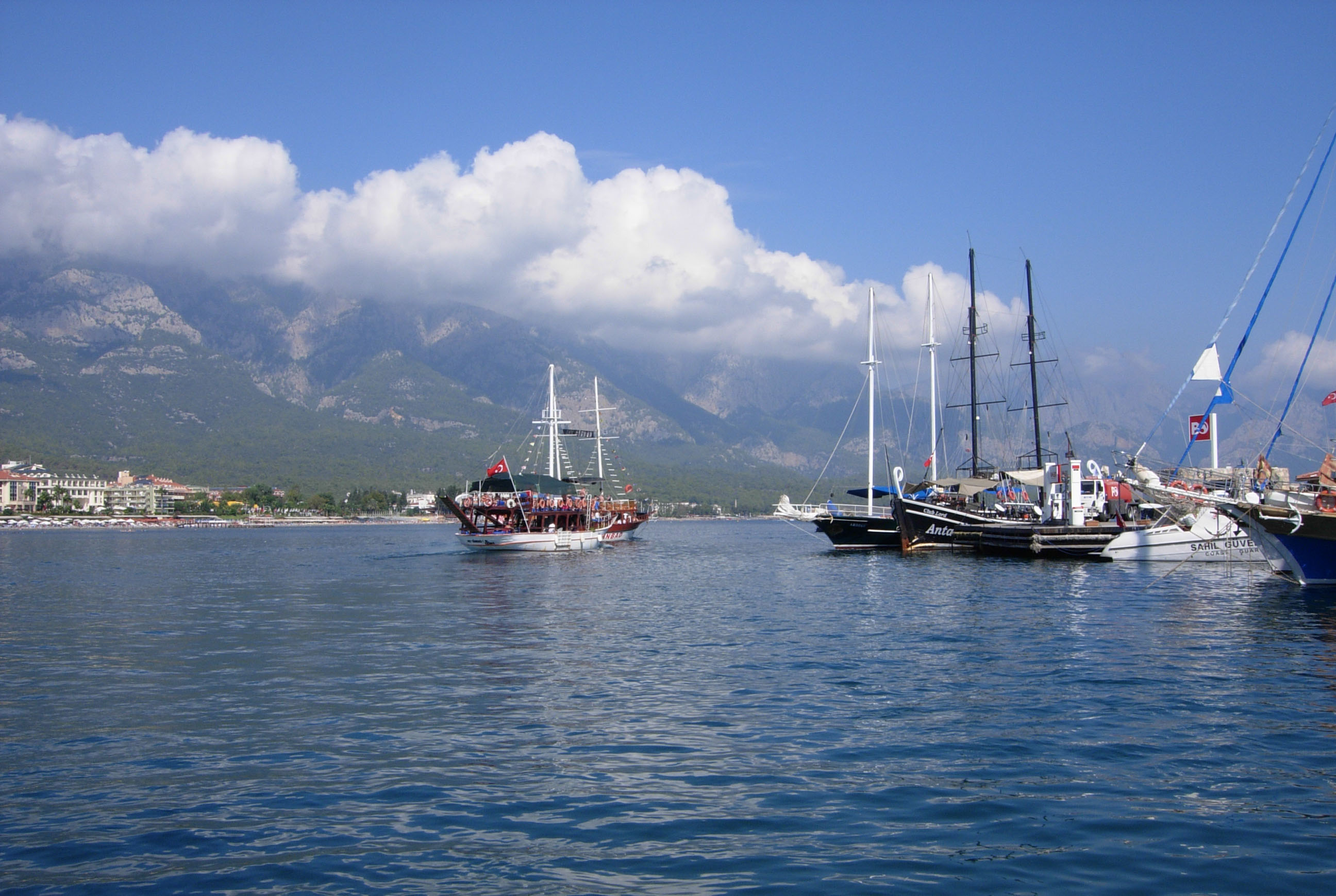
Port of Kemer

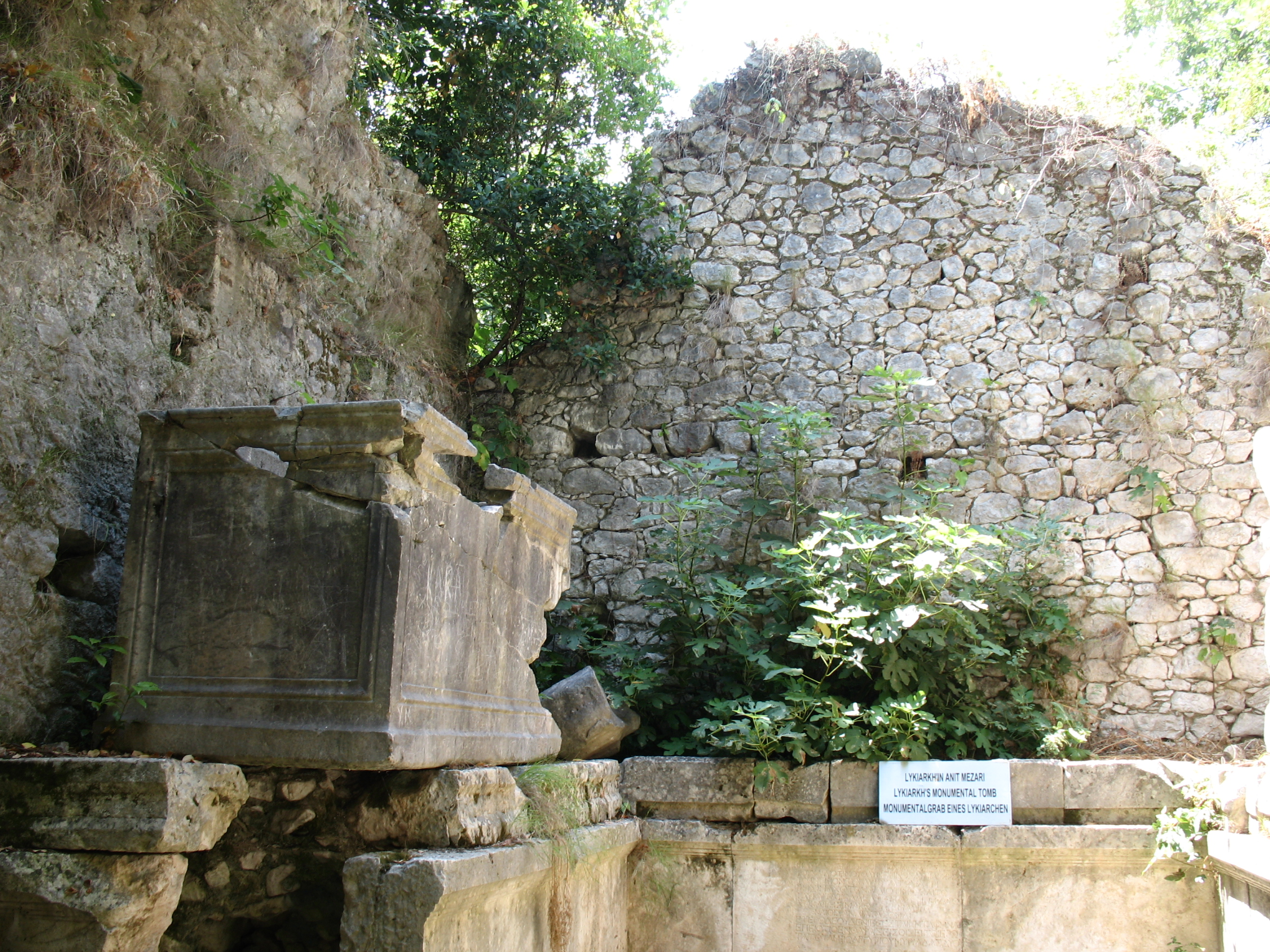
Tomb in Olympos

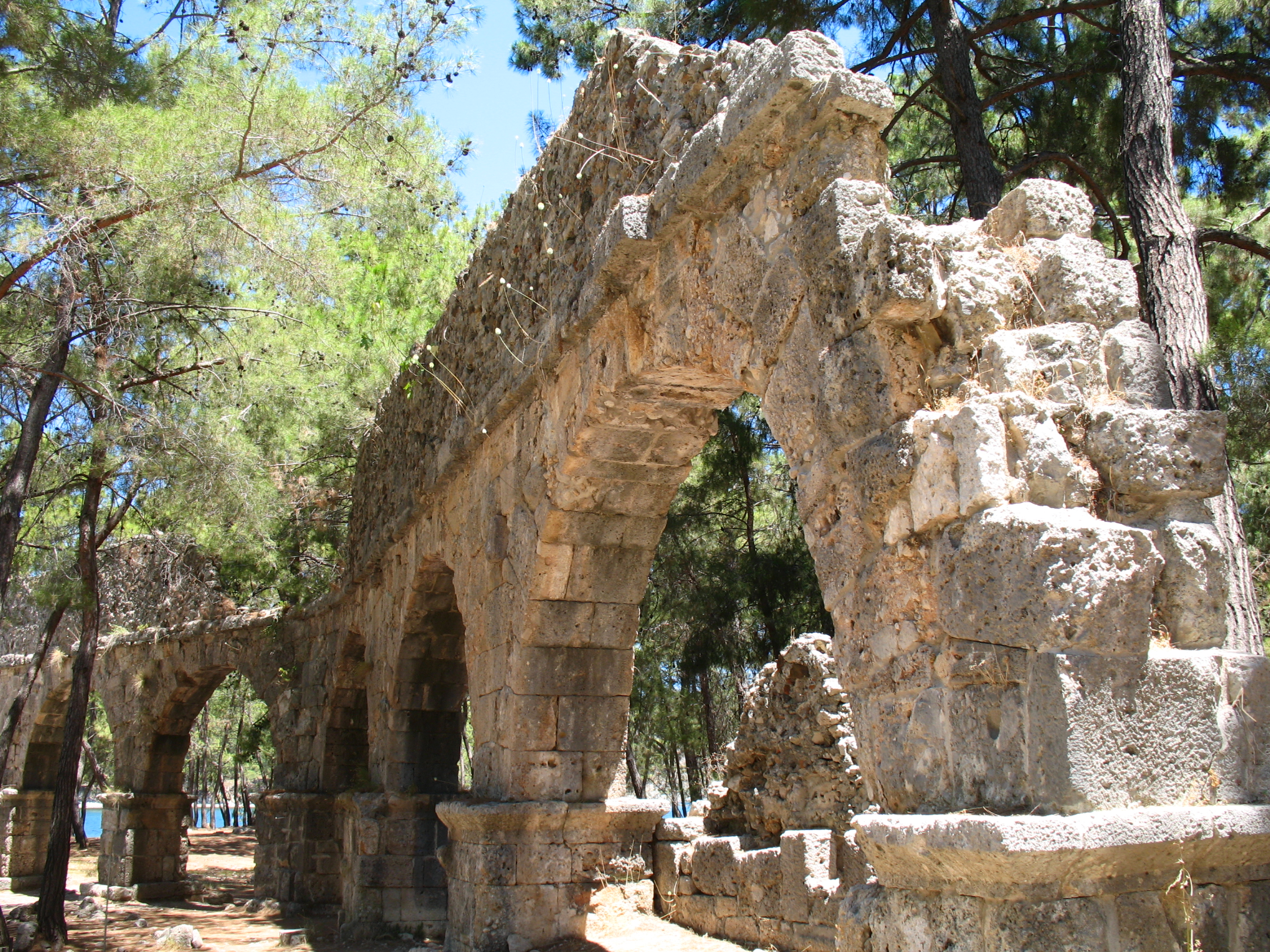
Aqueduct in Phaselis

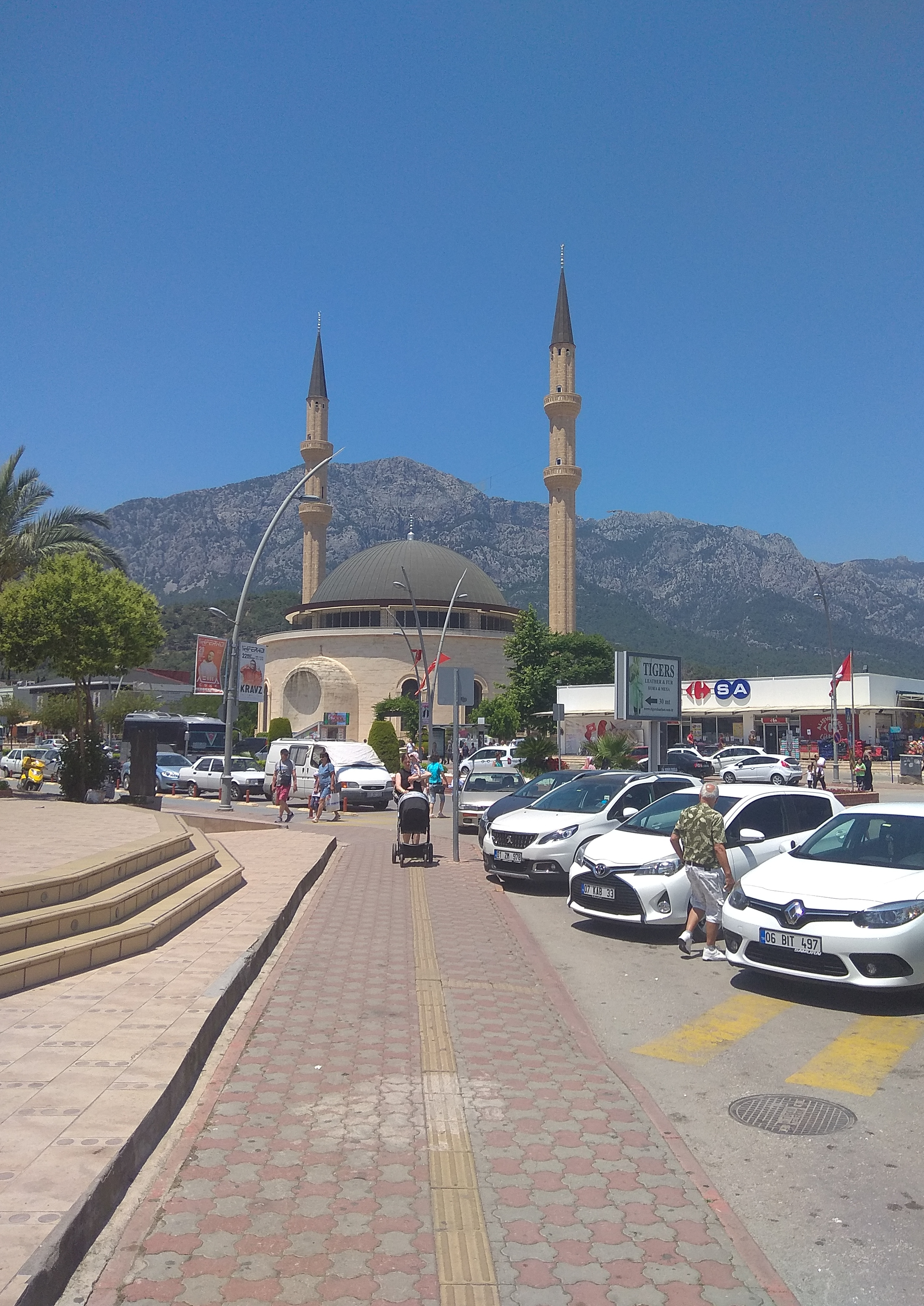
Huzur Jami Mosque in Kemer

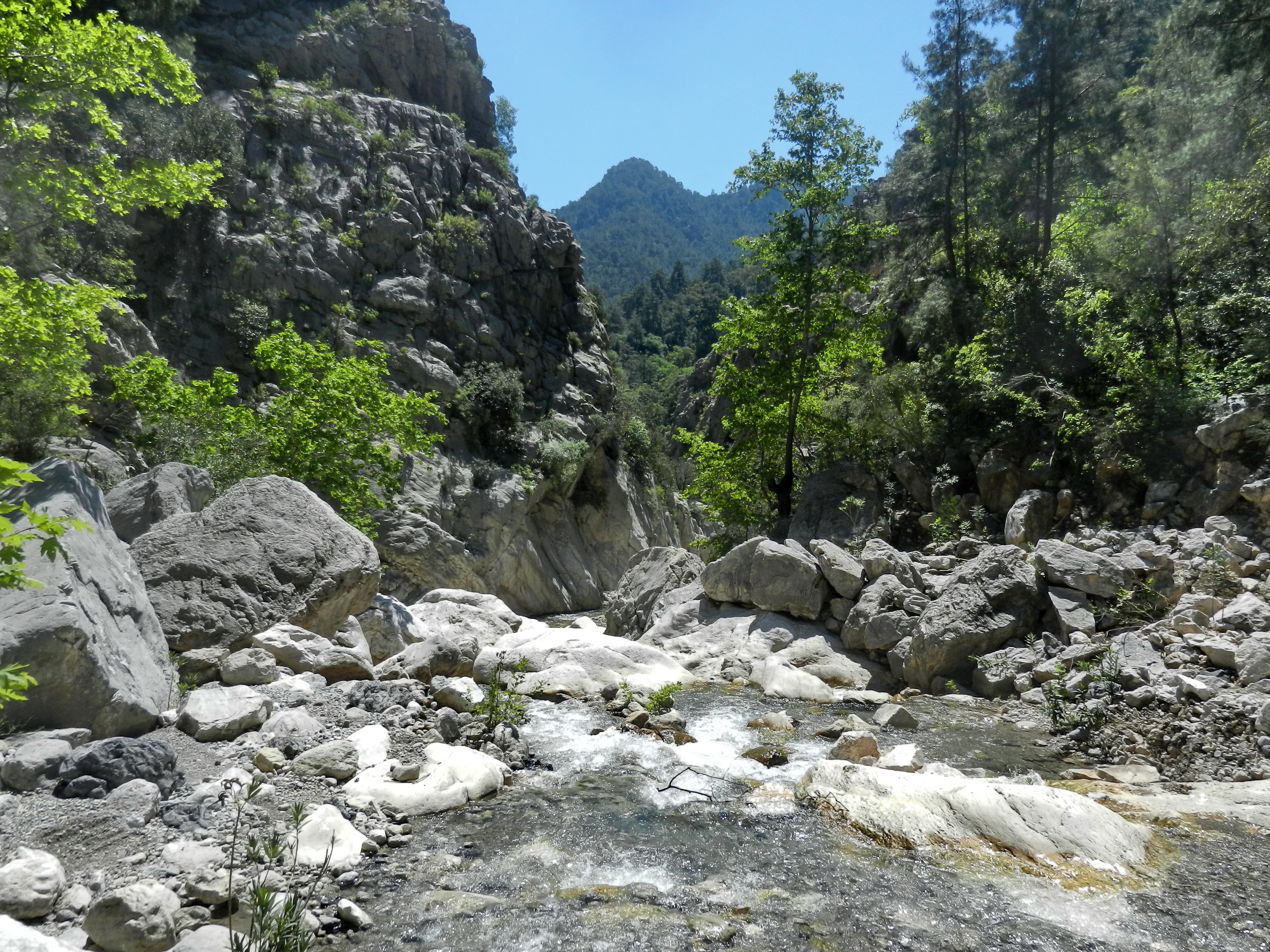
Goynuk Canyon
