= Çıralı =

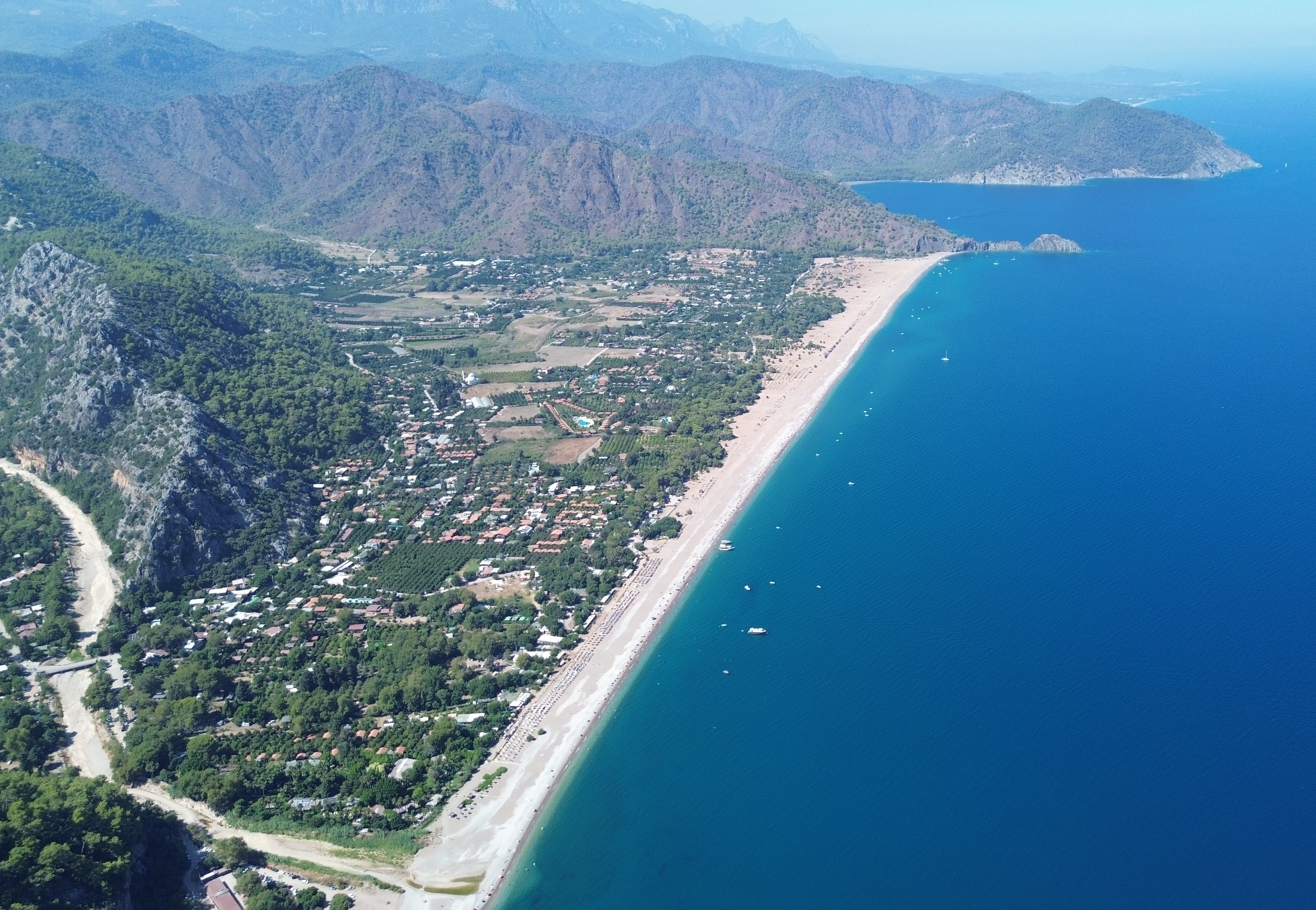

- Location within Turkey
- Coordinates: 36°23′48″N 30°28′23″E
- Country: Turkey
- Province: Antalya Province
- District: Kemer

Çıralı is an agricultural village in southwest Turkey, in the Kemer district of Antalya Province. It is walking distance from the ancient ruins of Olympos and Chimaera permanent gas vents, located in the ancient Lycia region of Anatolia.

Çıralı is a small village and is located southwest from Antalya. It has a 3.5 km secluded beach. The ancient ruins of Olympos are located at the far end of its coast. The Chimaera is located here.The beach at Cirali is also a popular attraction. It is a major nesting site for Caretta Caretta turtles.

Images

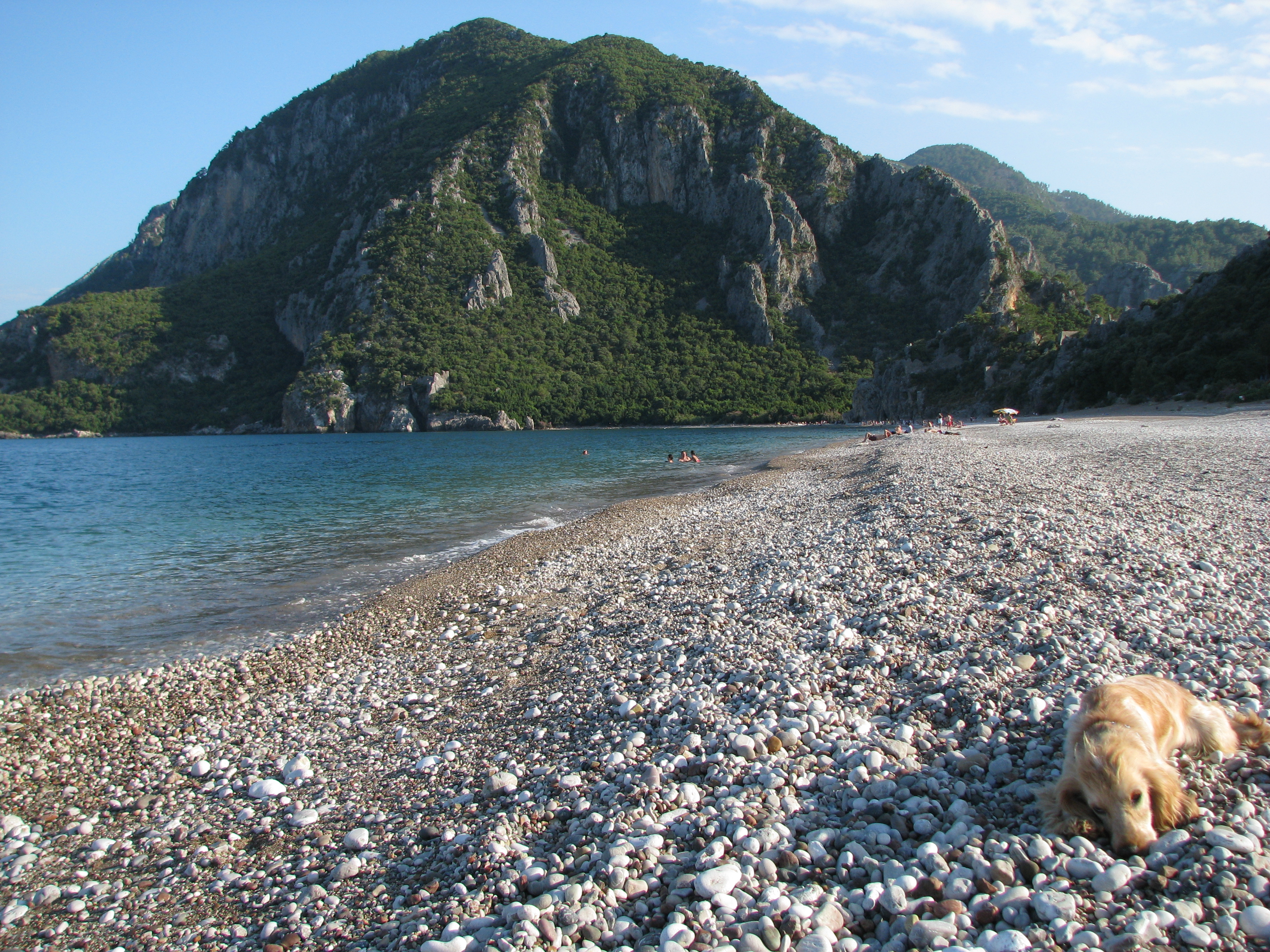
Cirali Olympos Beach

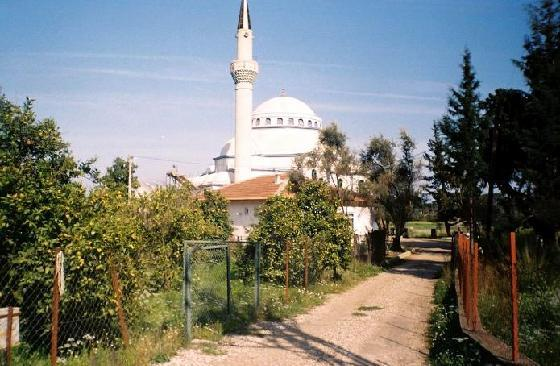
The mosque in Çıralı
