= List of Lycian place names =

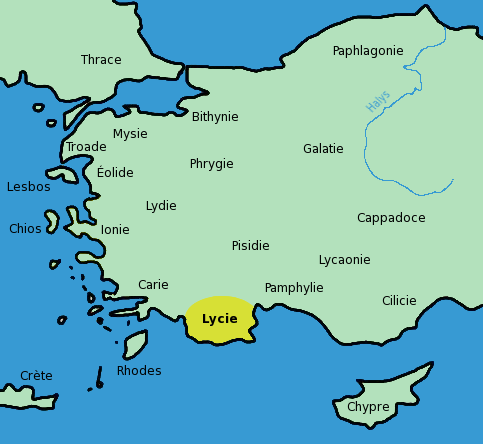
Location of ancient Lycia in modern-day Turkey

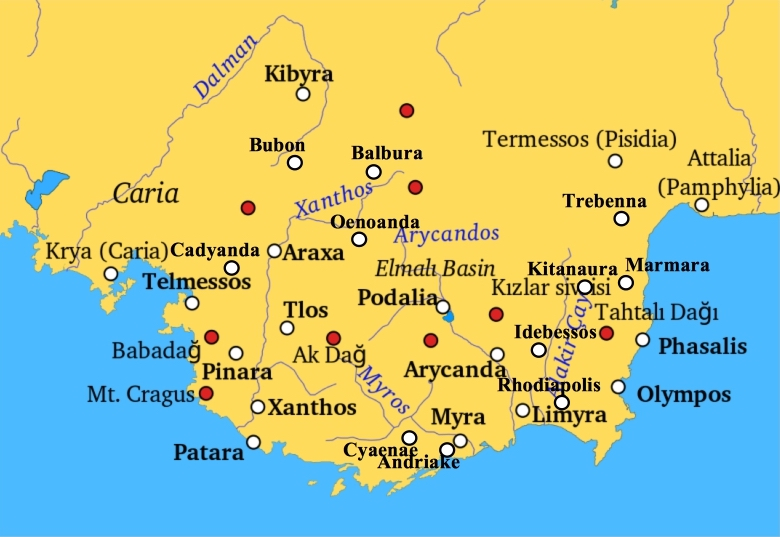
Cities of ancient Lycia

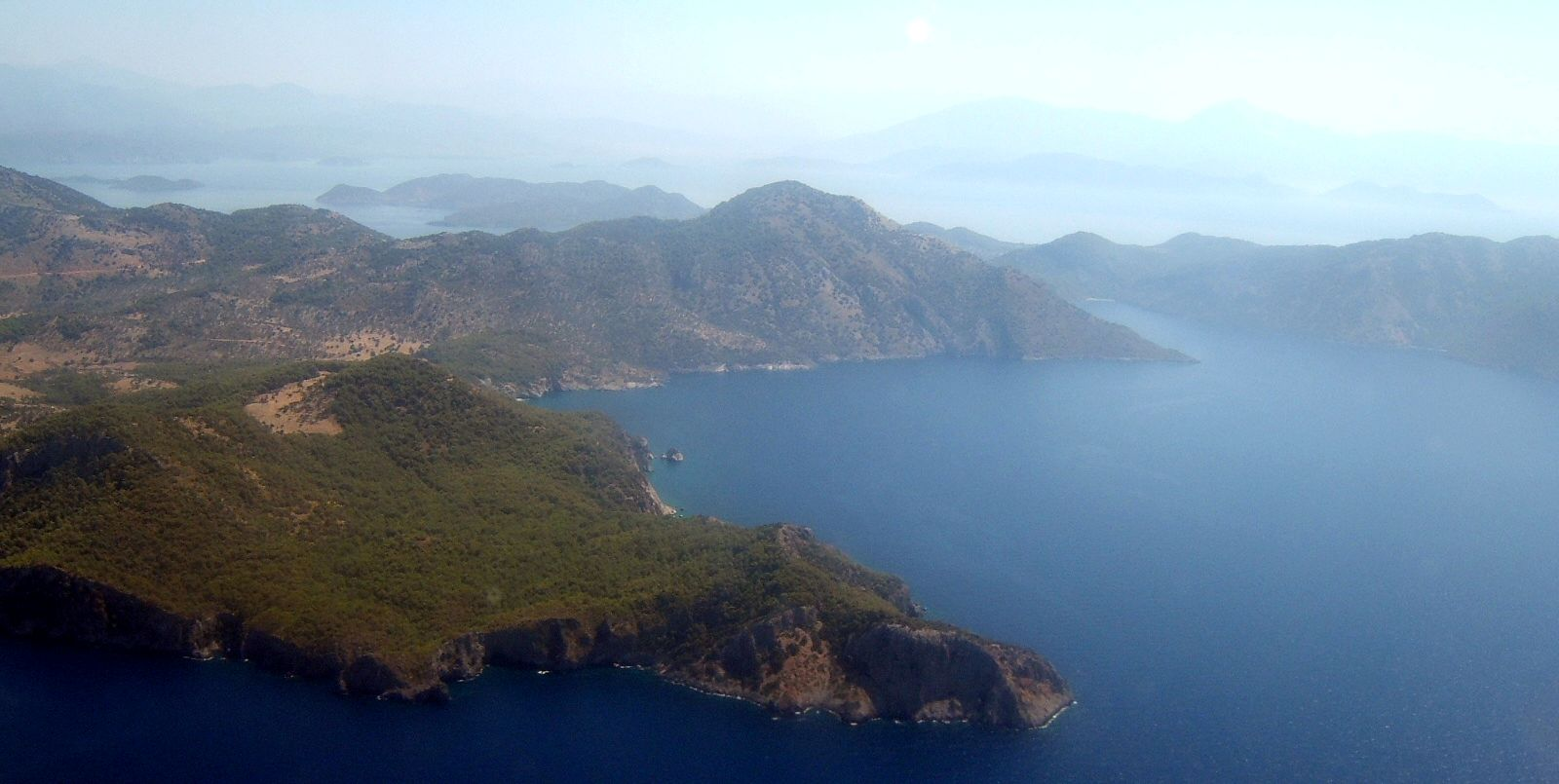
Turkish coast near Dalaman, Gulf of Fethiye in background

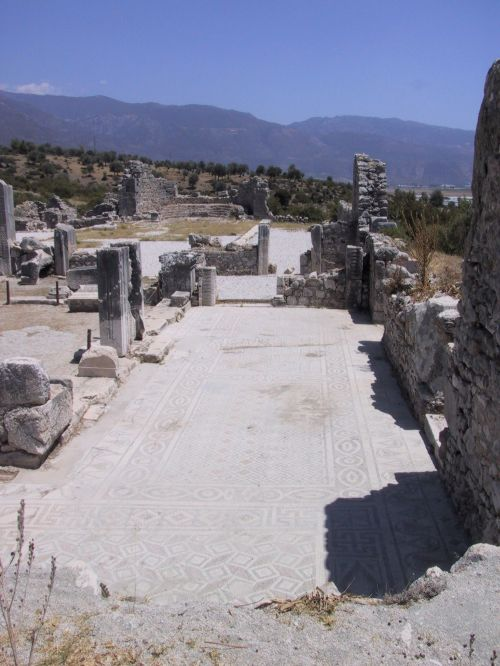
A view in ancient Xanthus

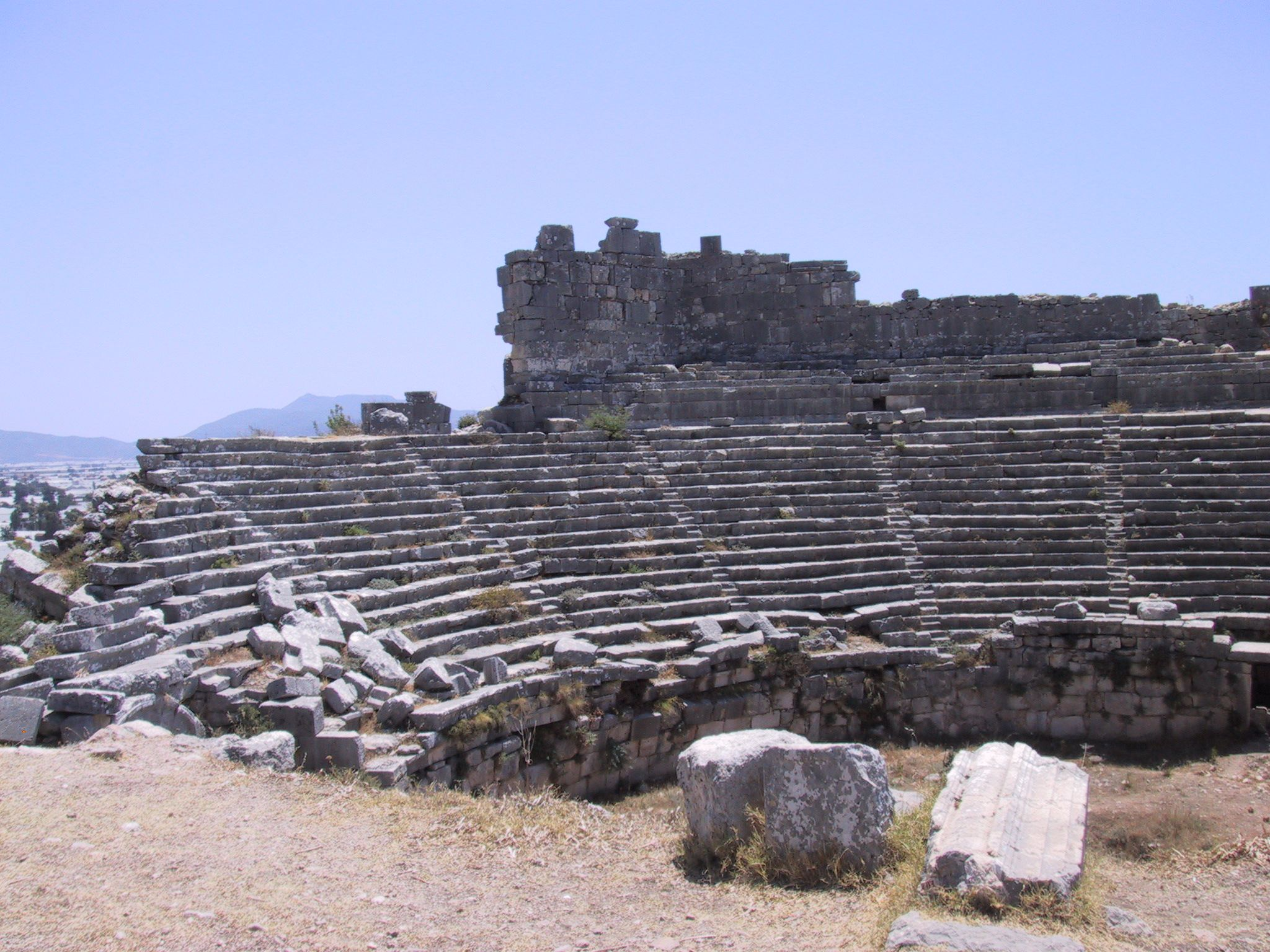
Xanthos, theater

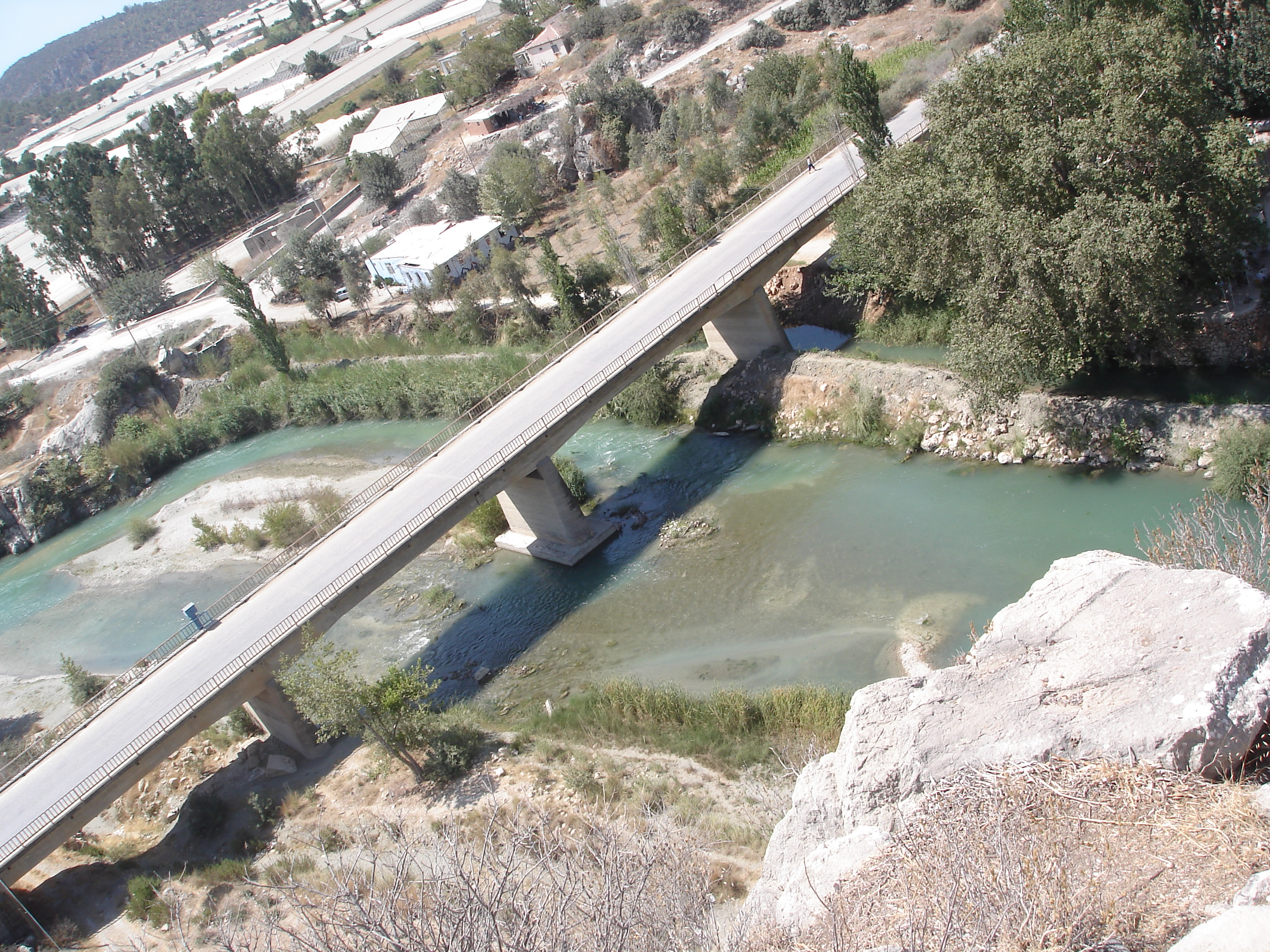
Xanthos River from the acropolis of Xanthos

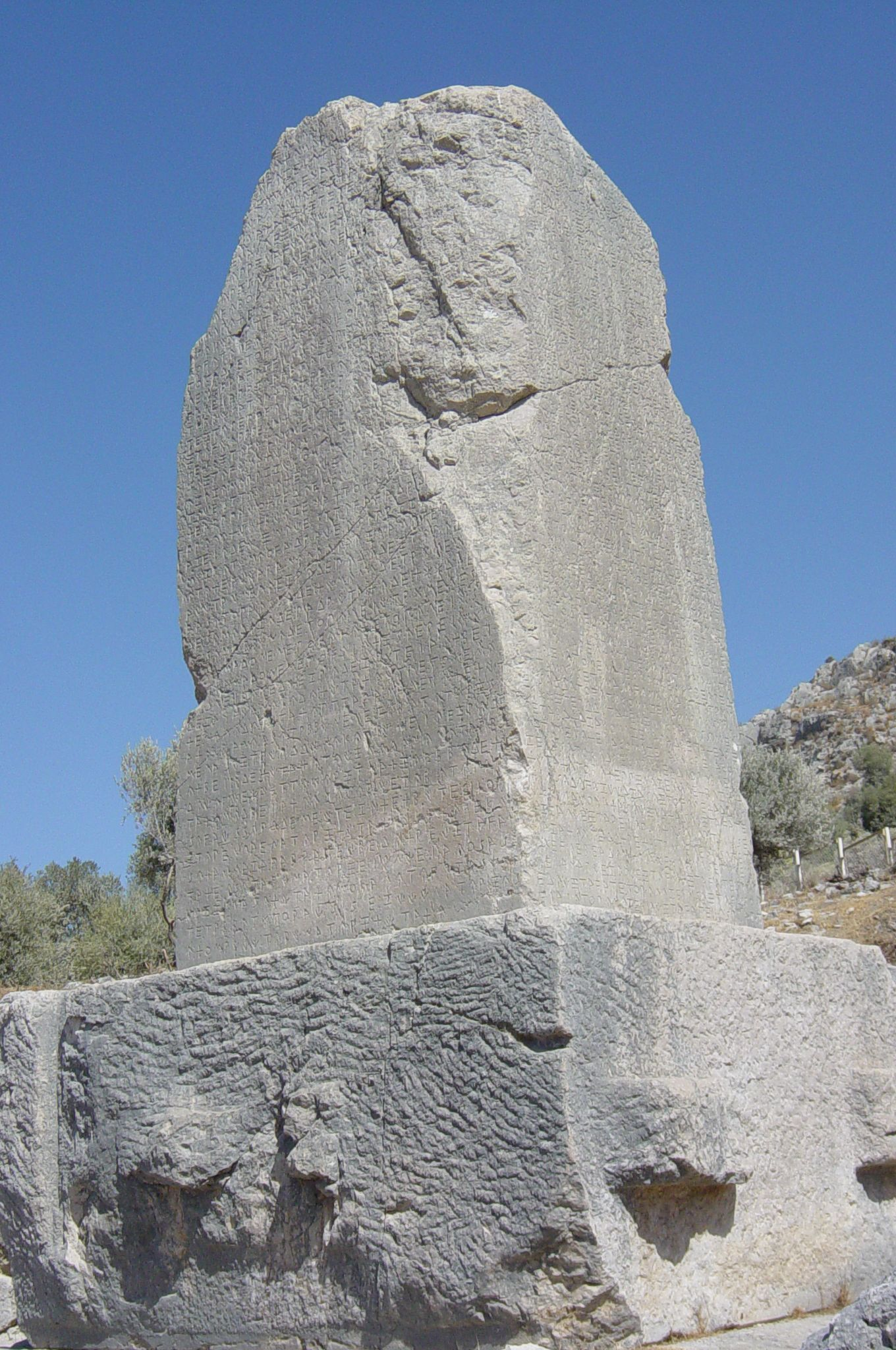
Xanthian Obelisk

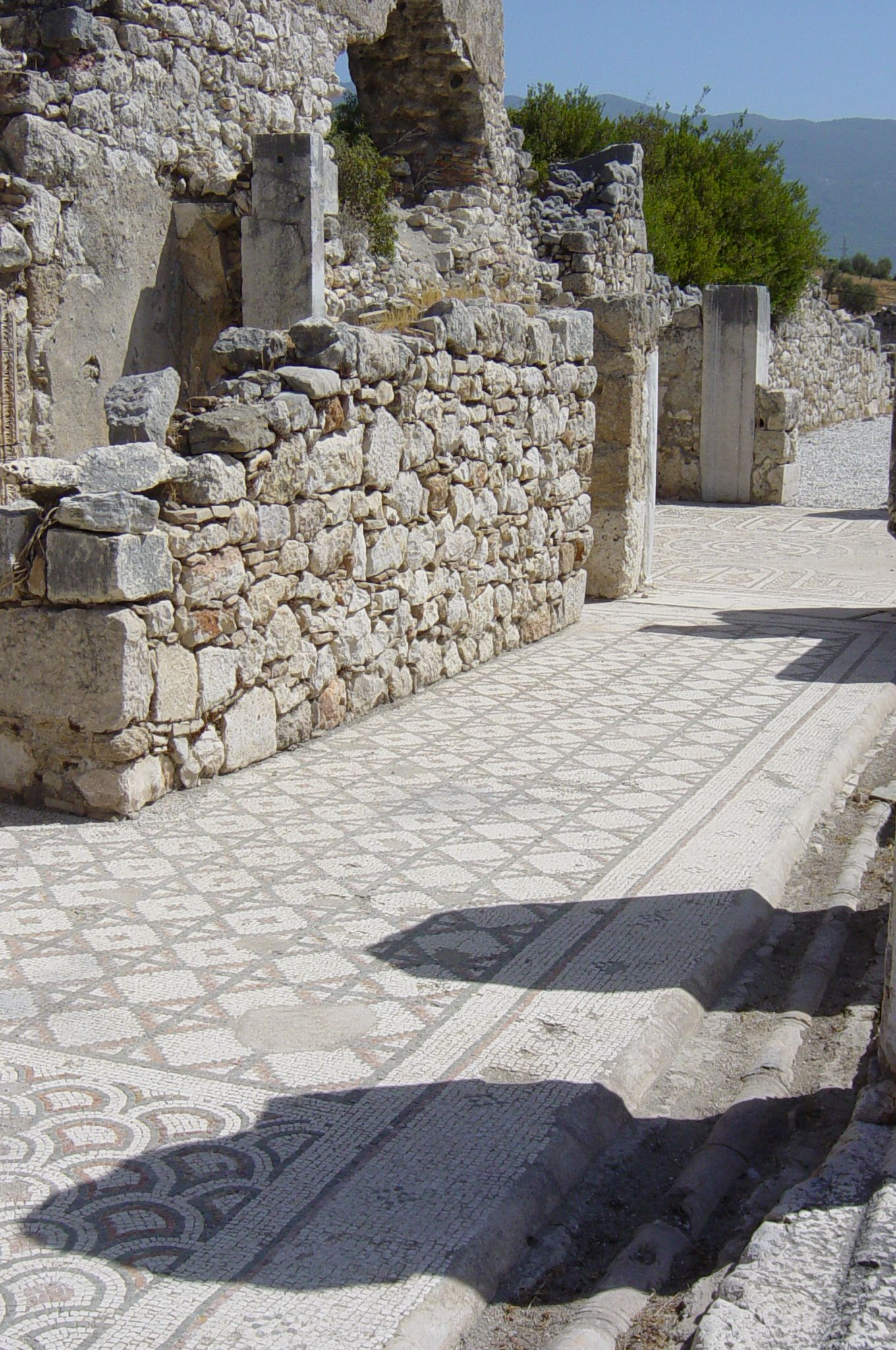
Mosaic at Xanthos

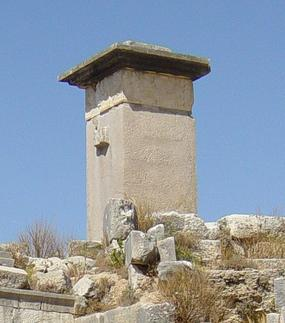
Harpy Tomb, Xanthus

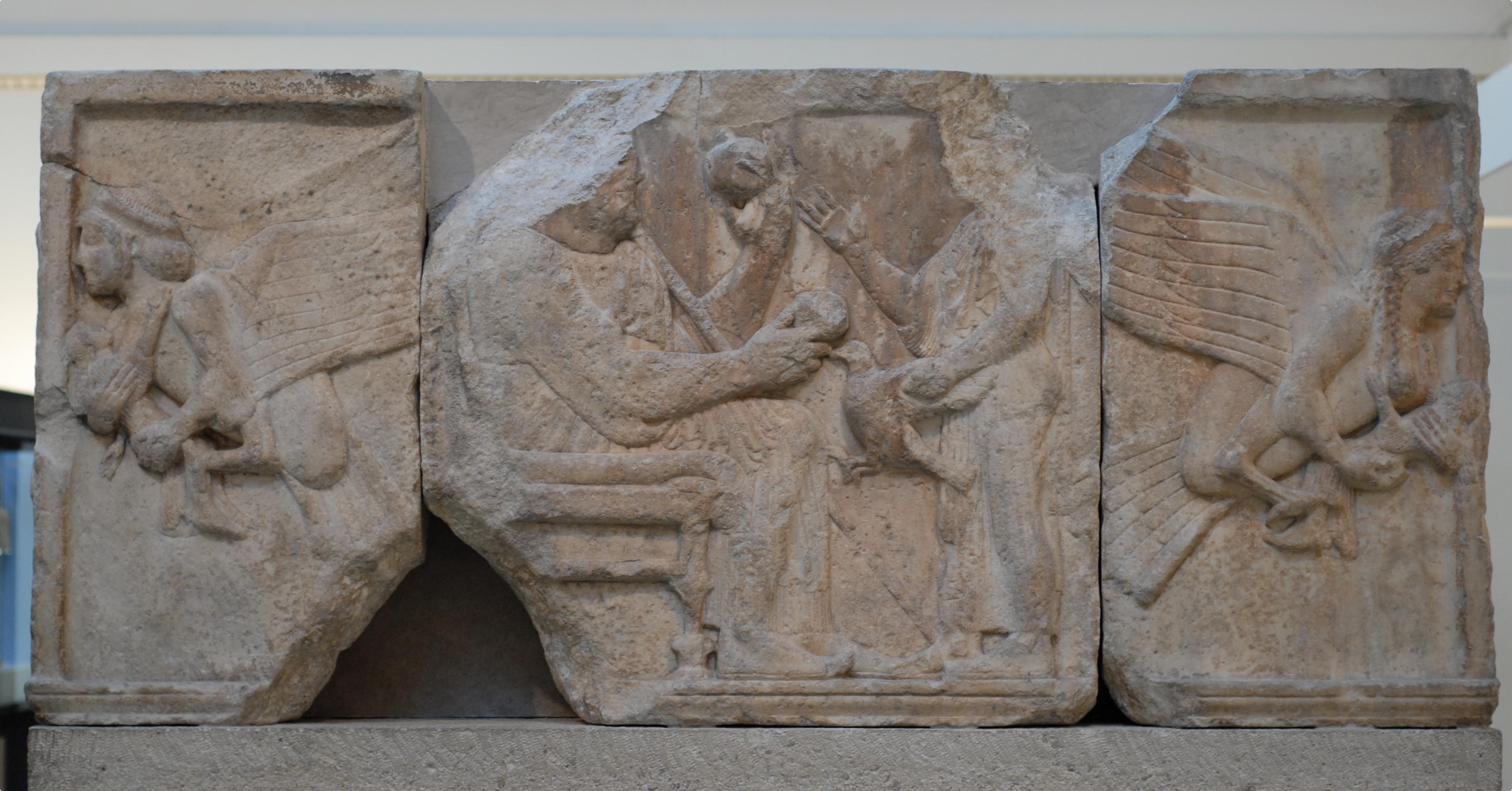
Harpies from the Harpy Tomb, Xanthus

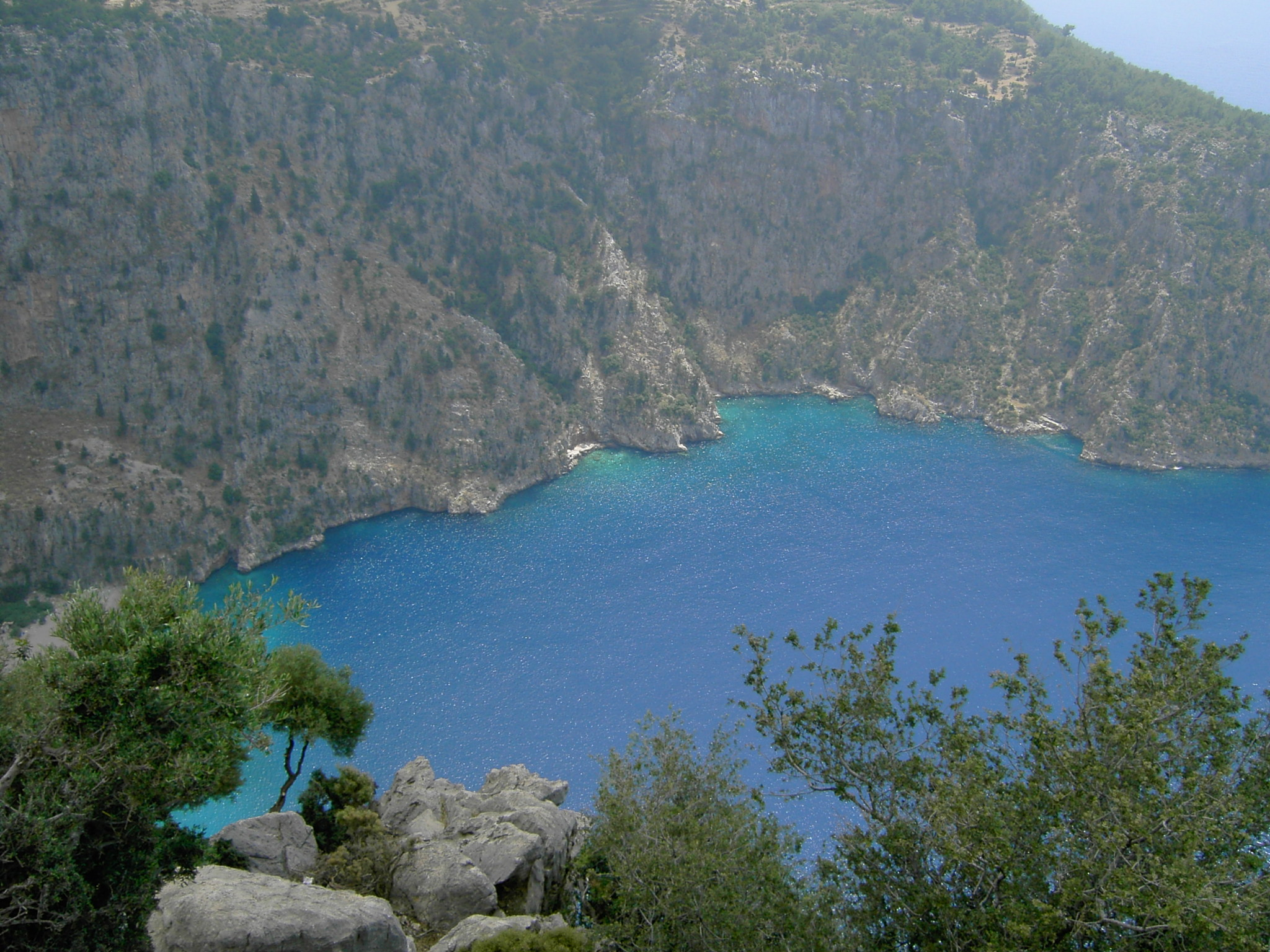
Butterfly Valley on the Lycian Way

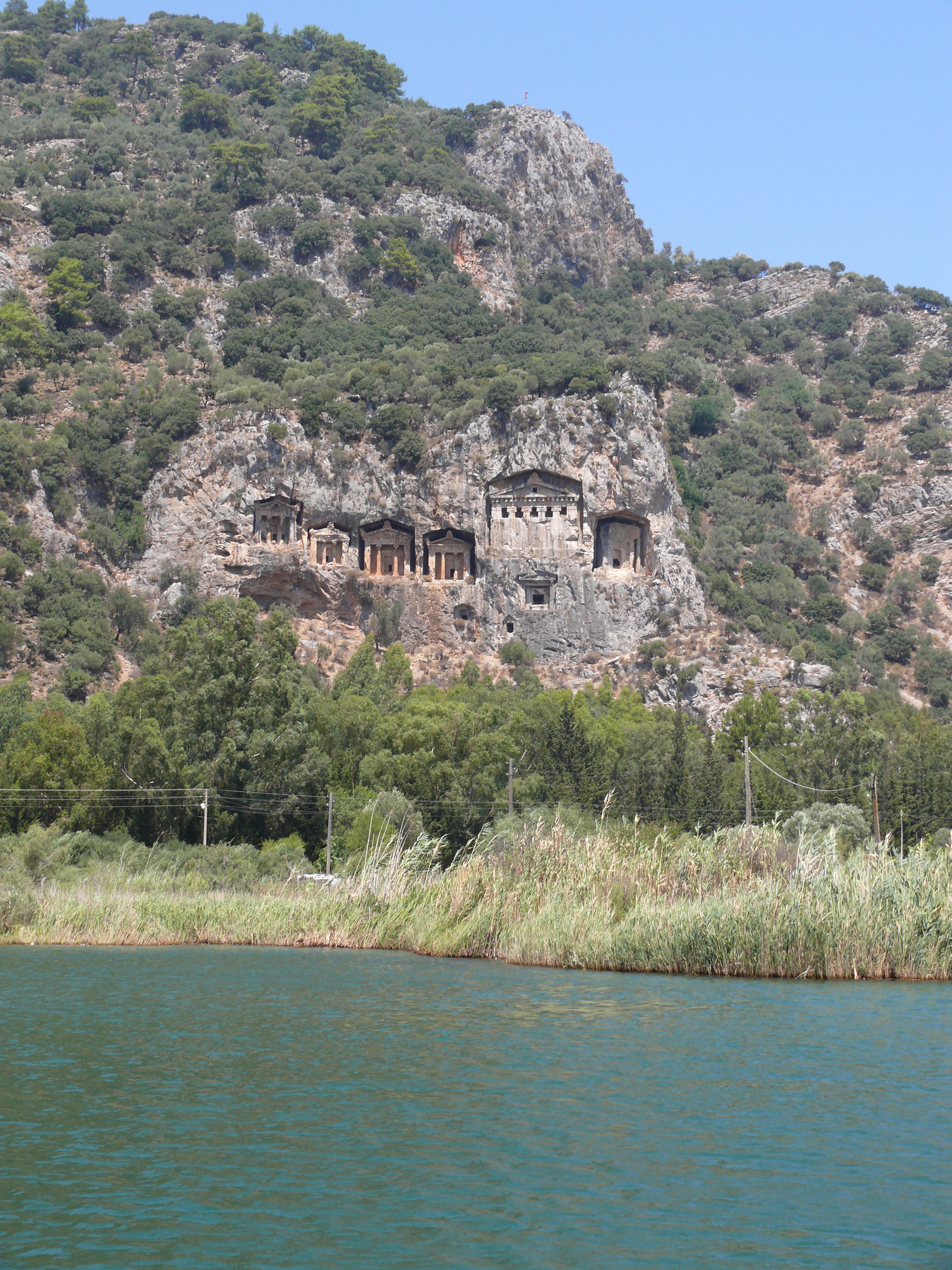
View of monuments at Caunus

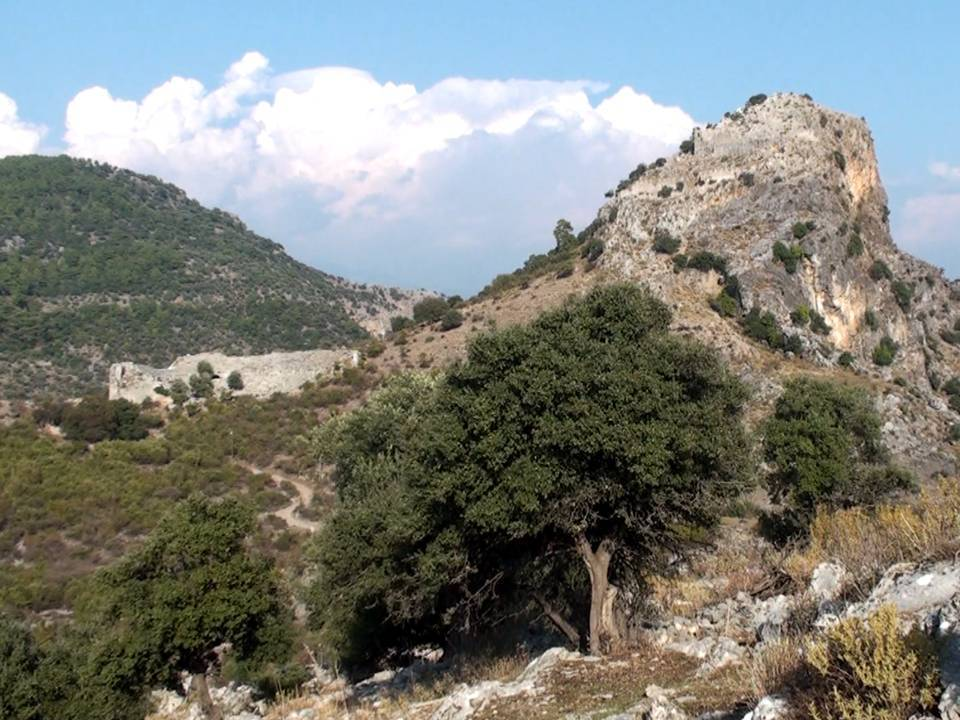
Acropolis and theater at Caunus

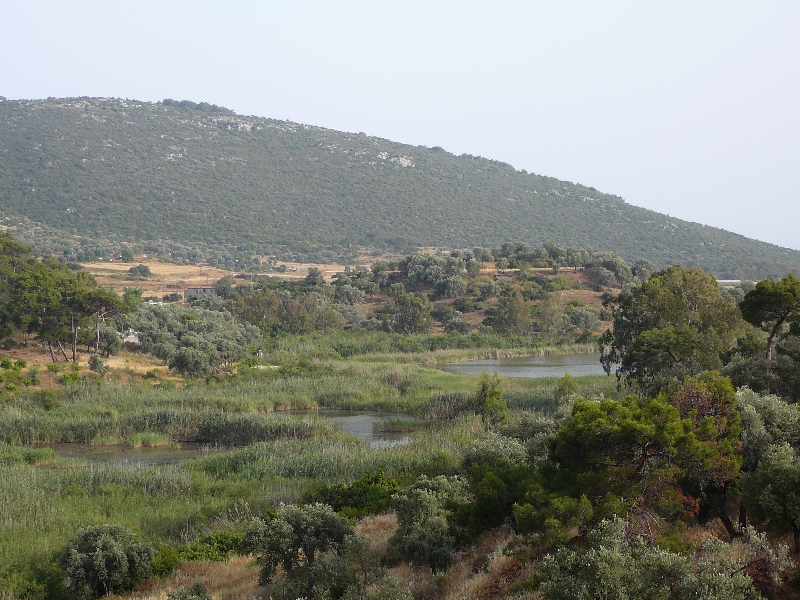
Ancient Patara

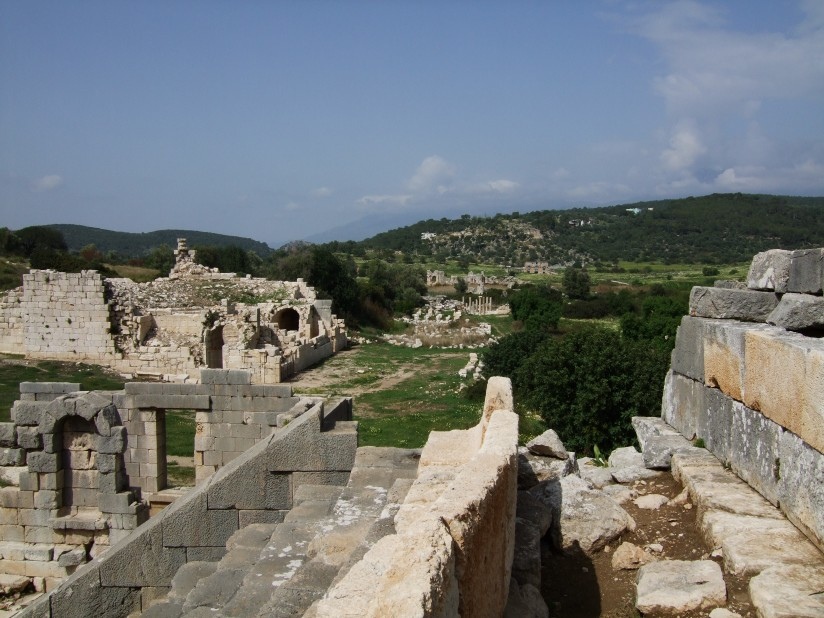
Ancient Patara

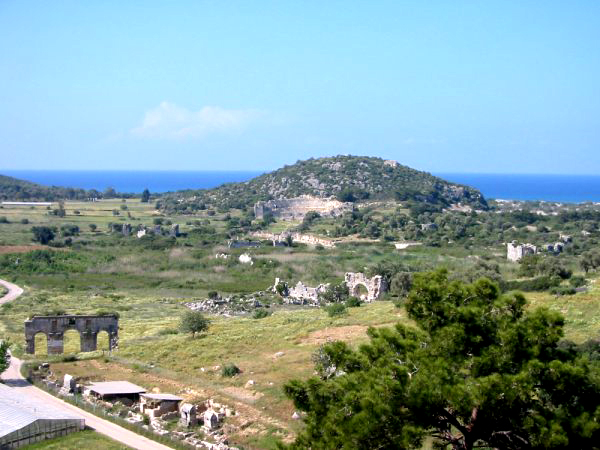
Ruins of Patara

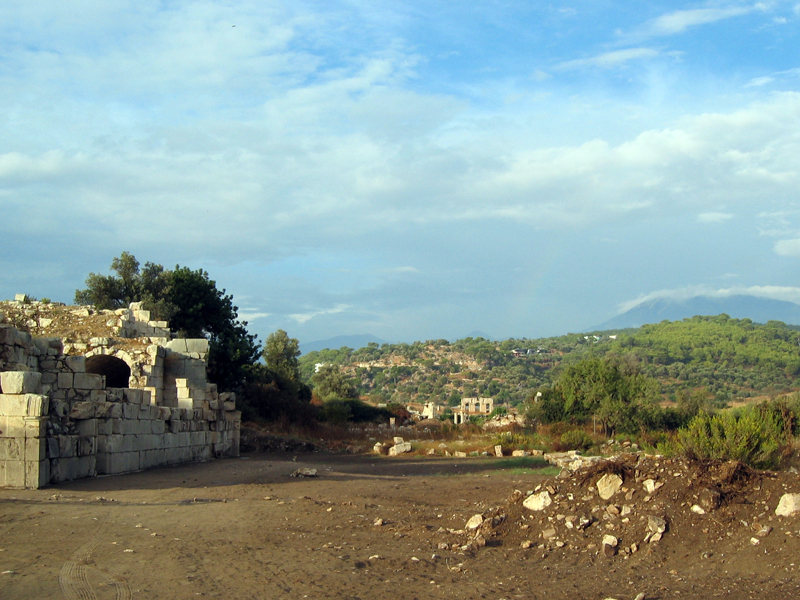
View of Patara

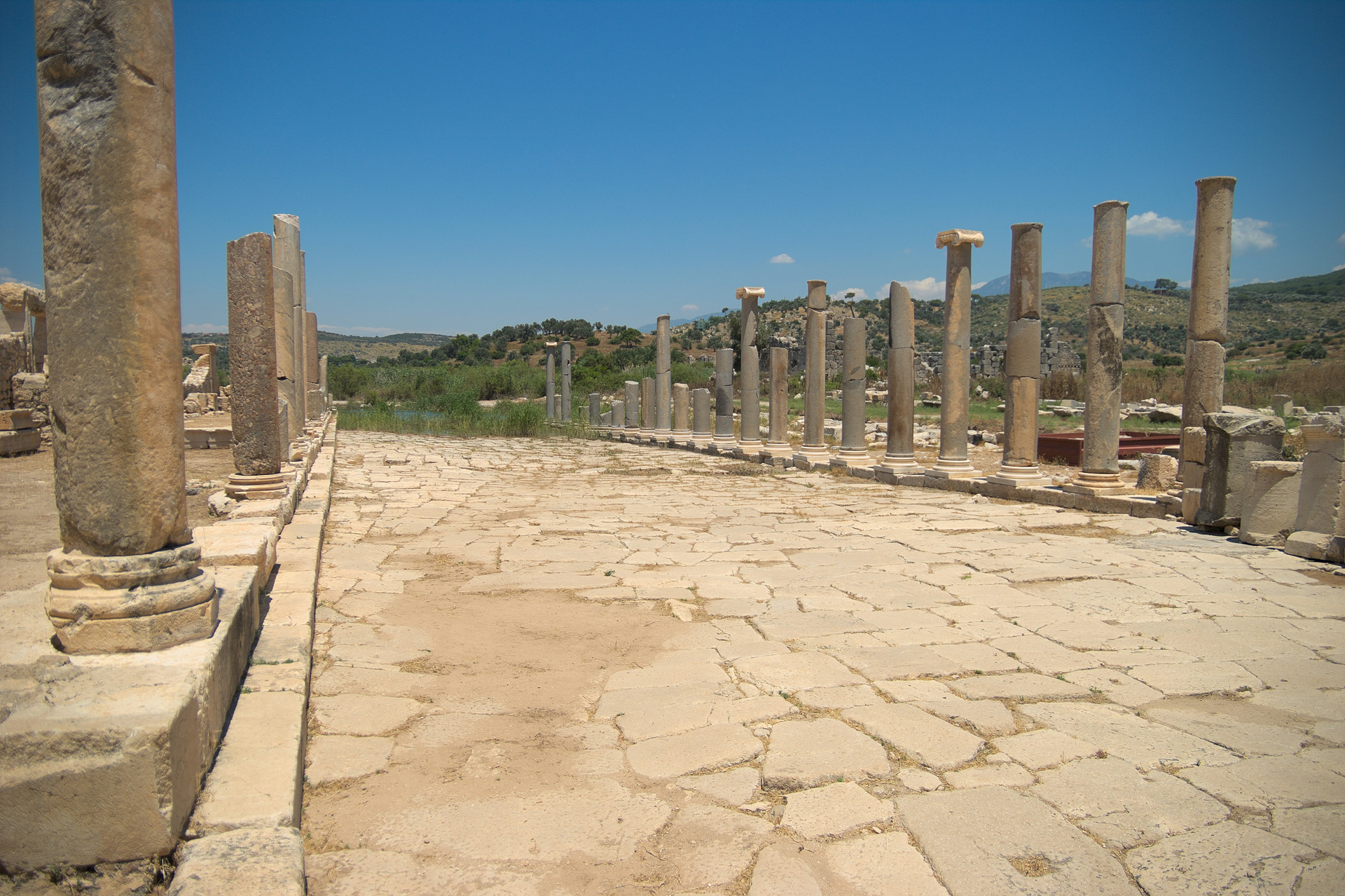
Patara

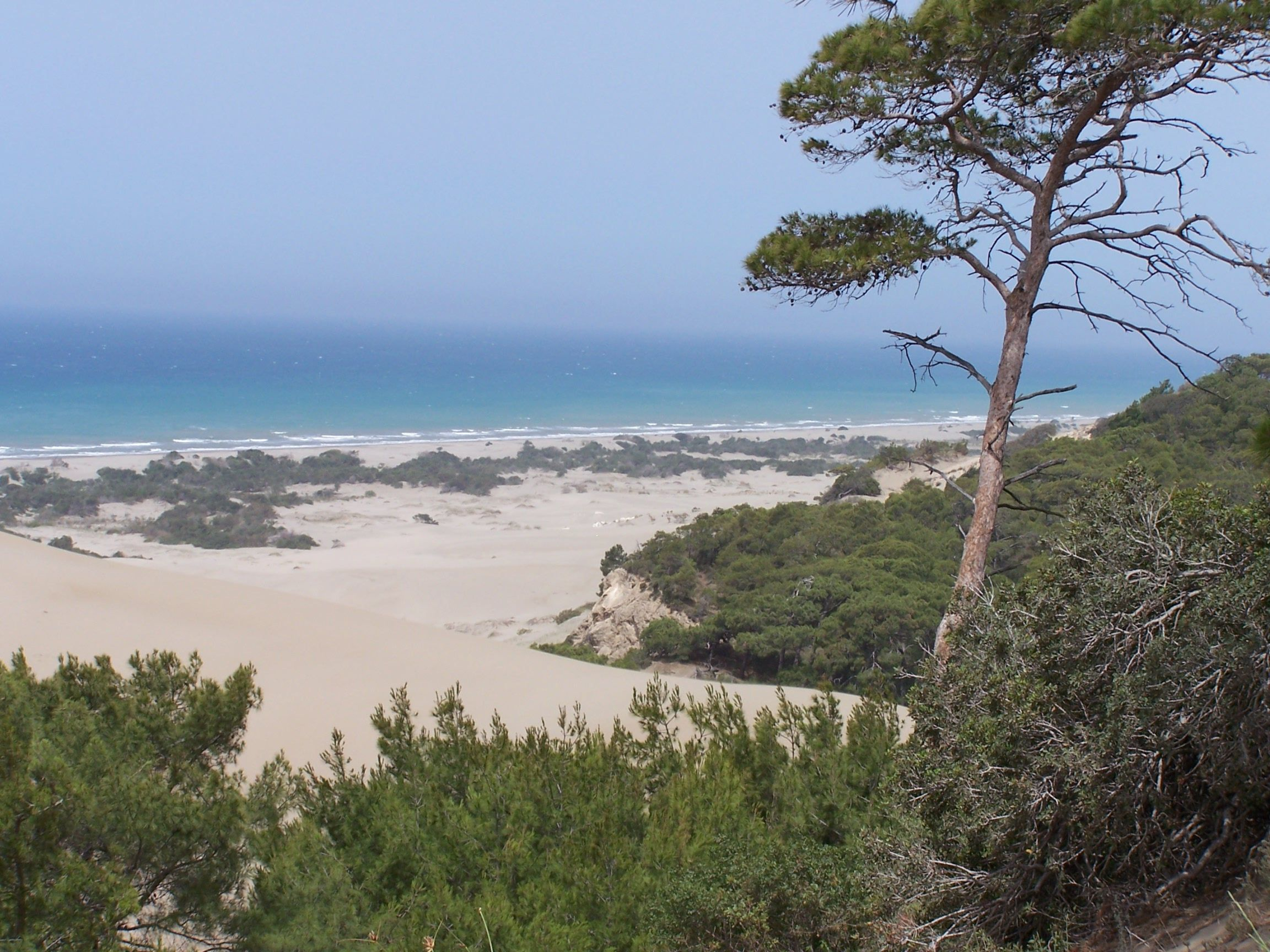
Dunes near Patara Beach

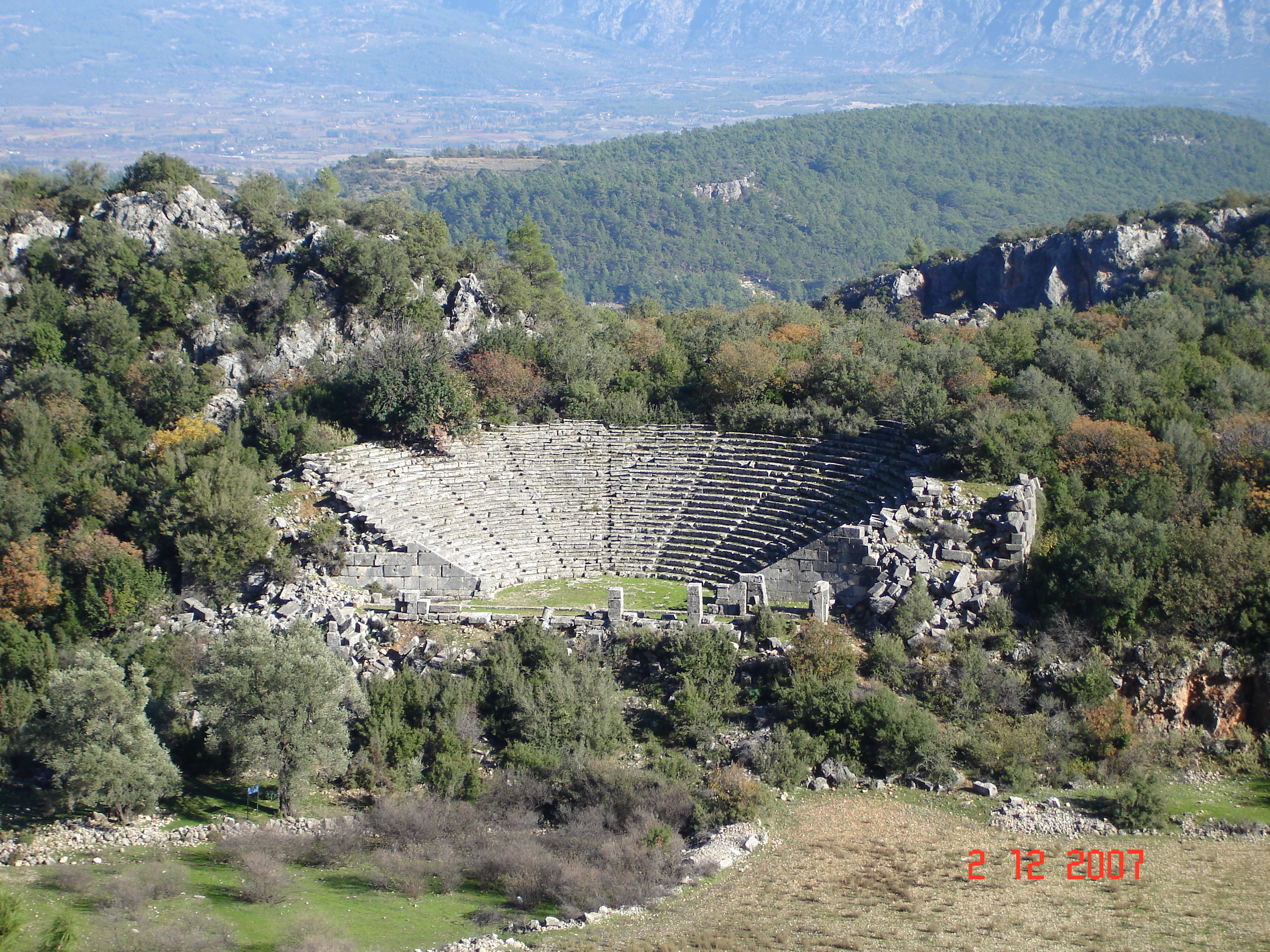
Pinara, amphitheater

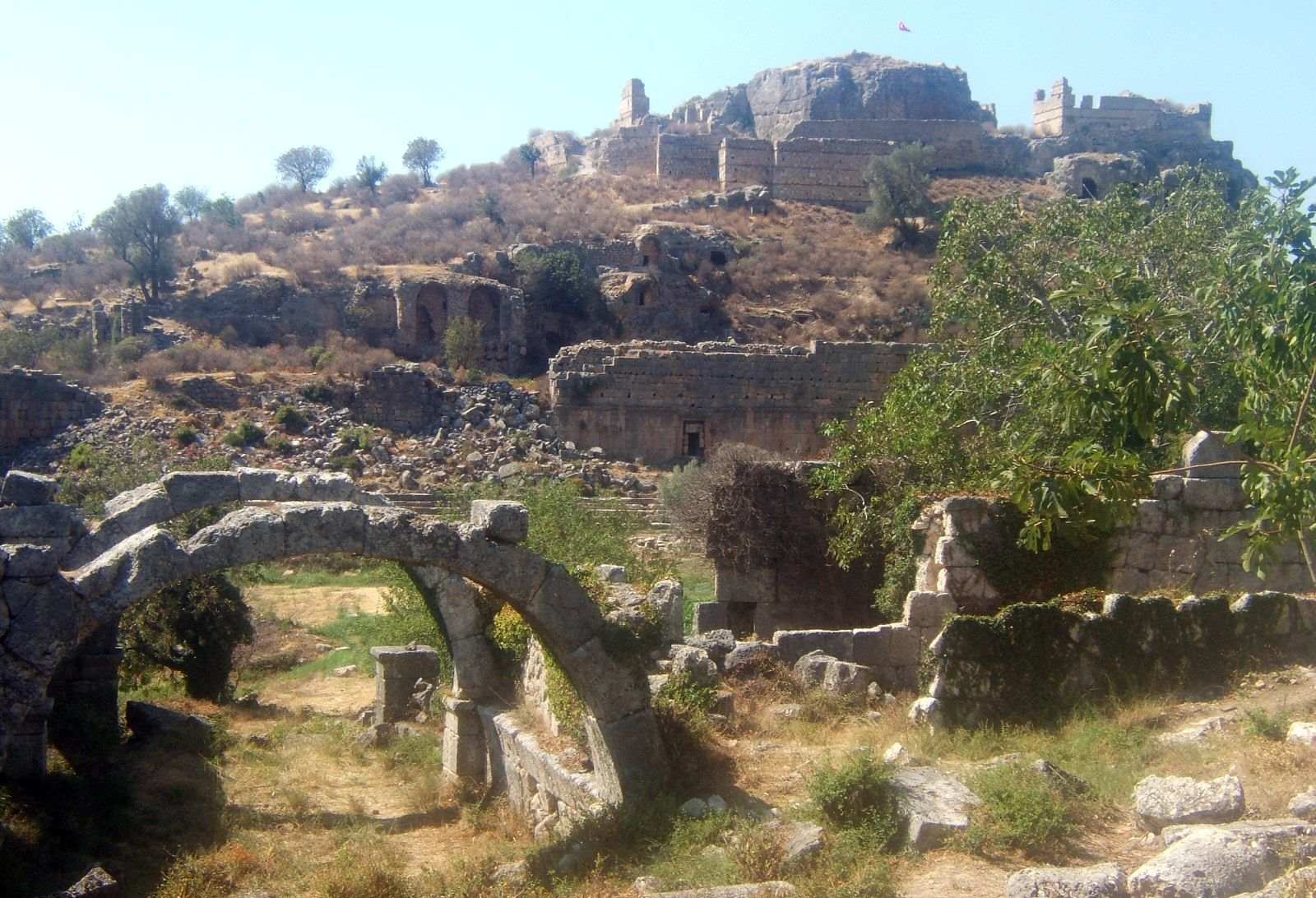
View of ancient Tlos

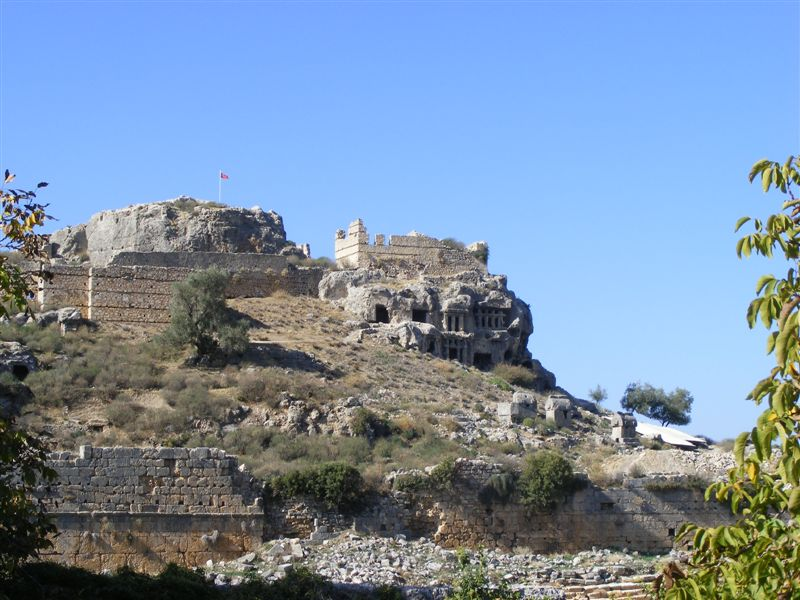
Acropolis at Tlos

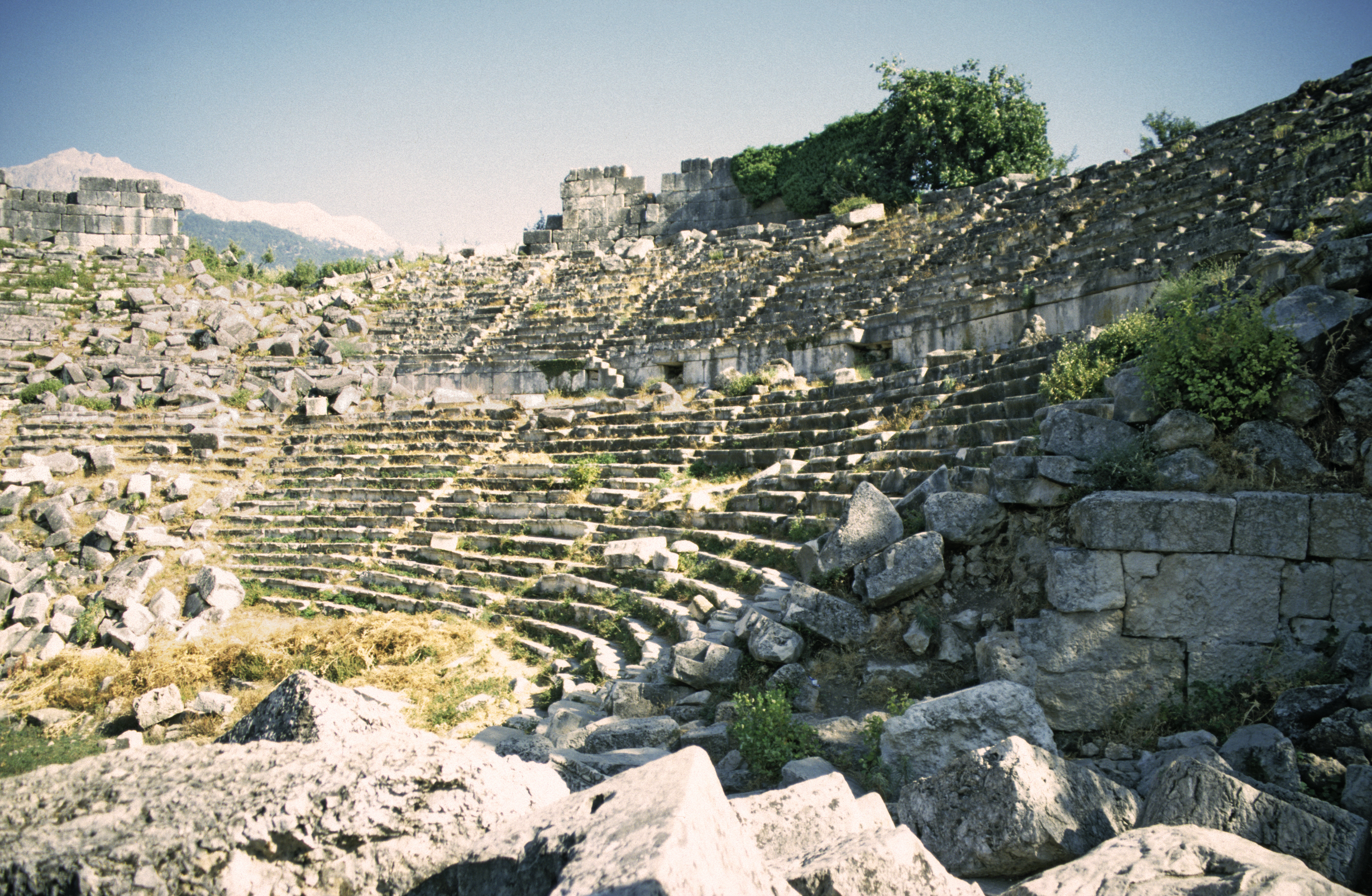
Theater at Tlos

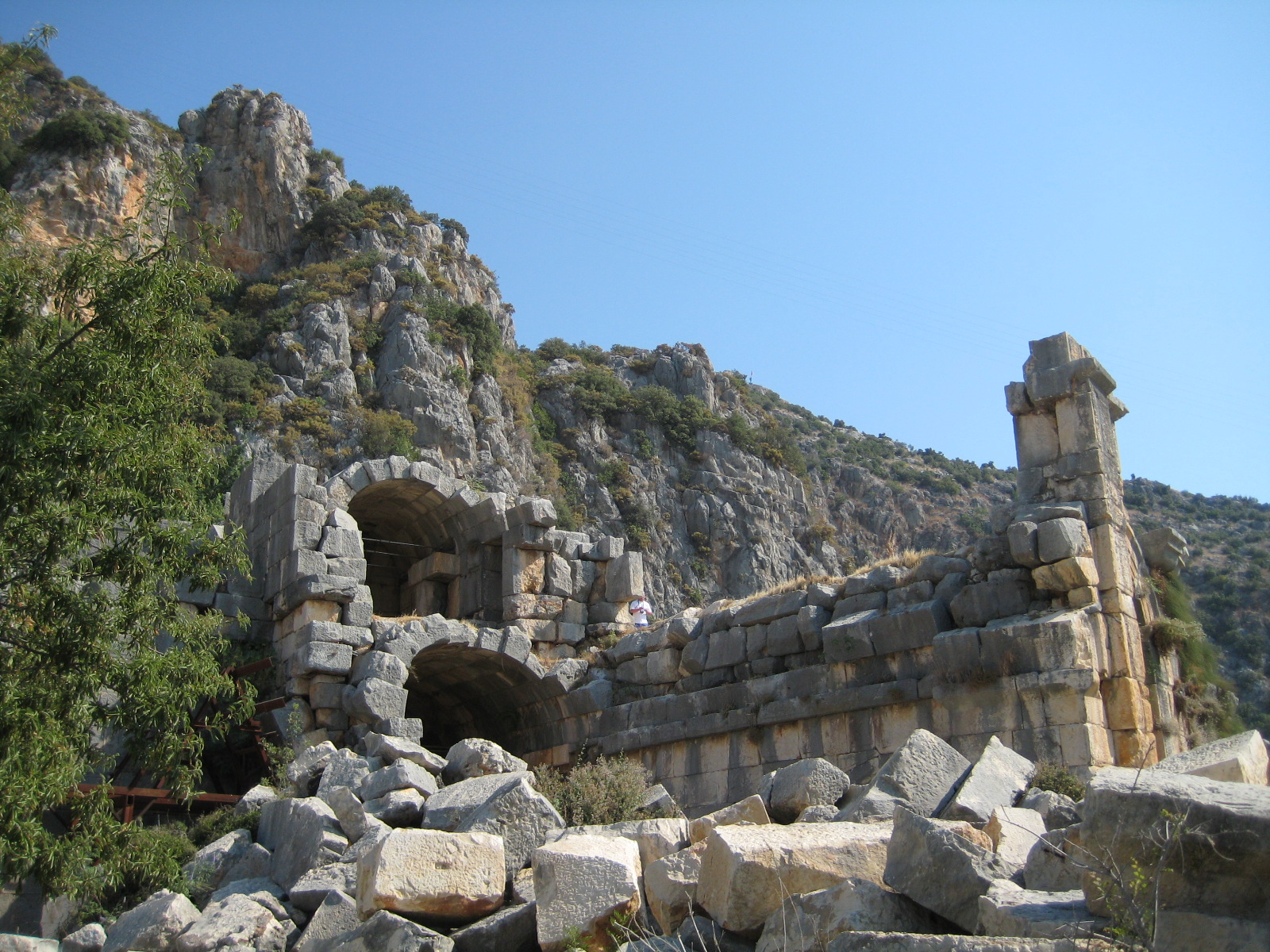
Entrance to amphitheater, Myra

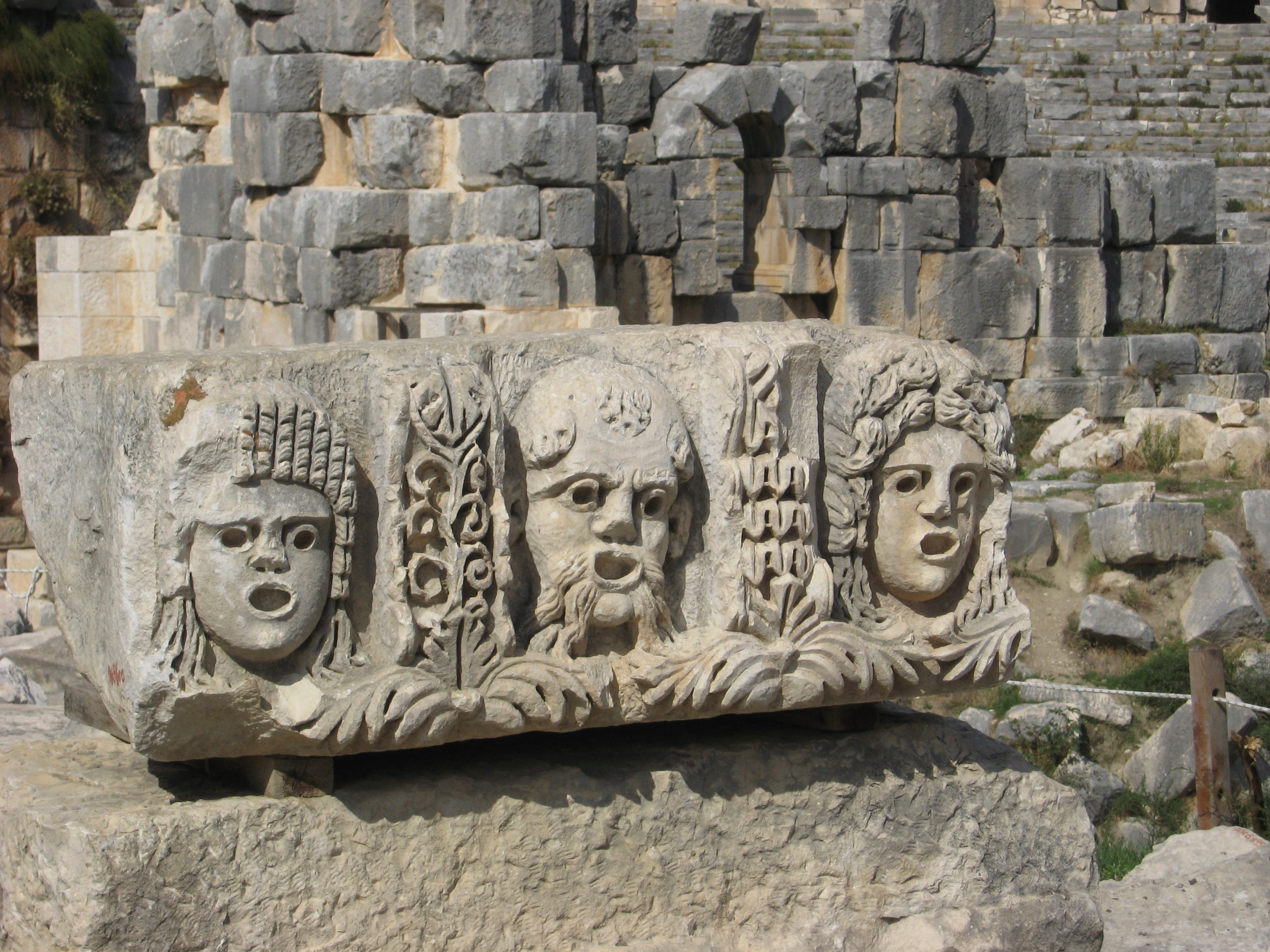
Masks worn by actors at Myra

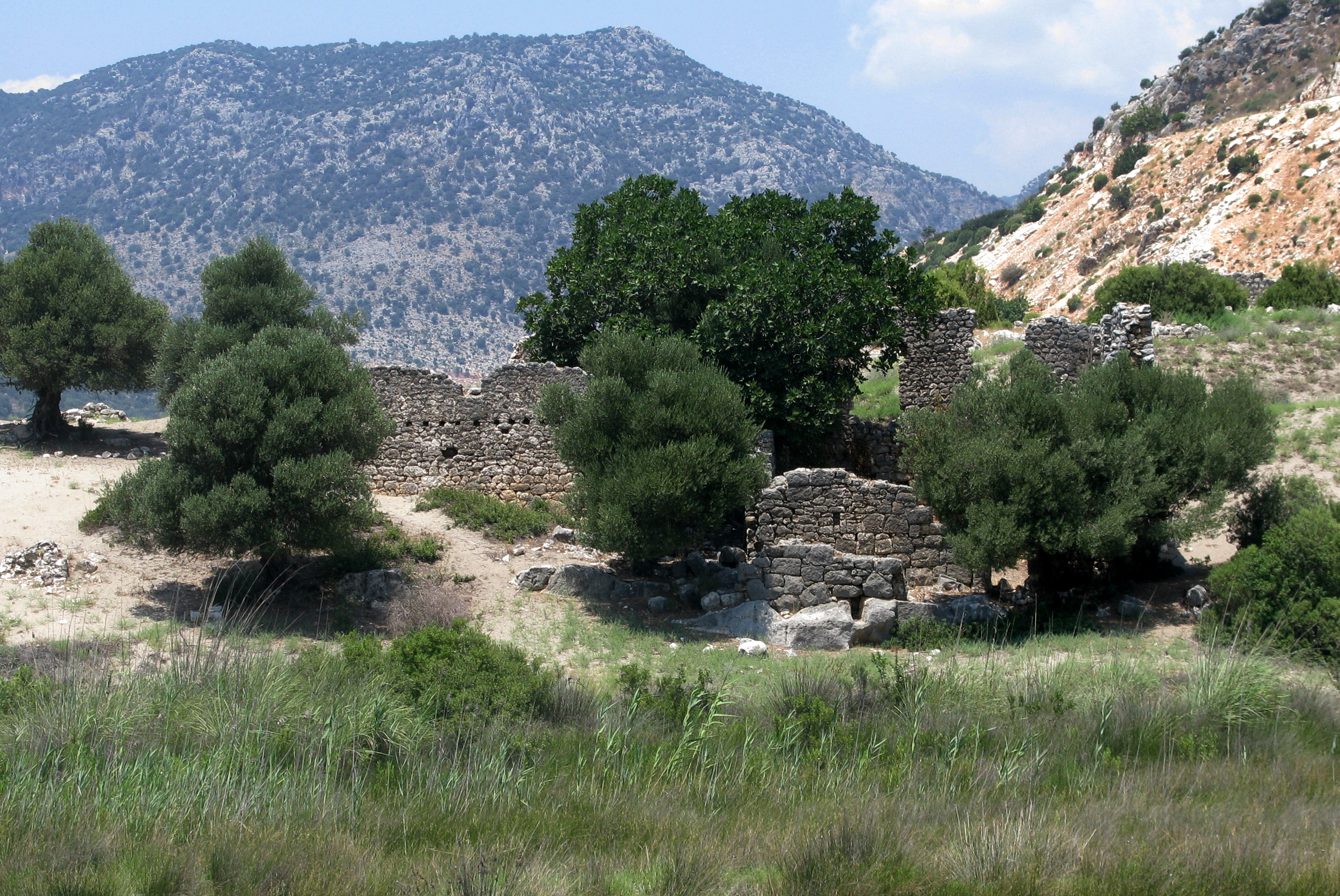
Ruins of Andriake

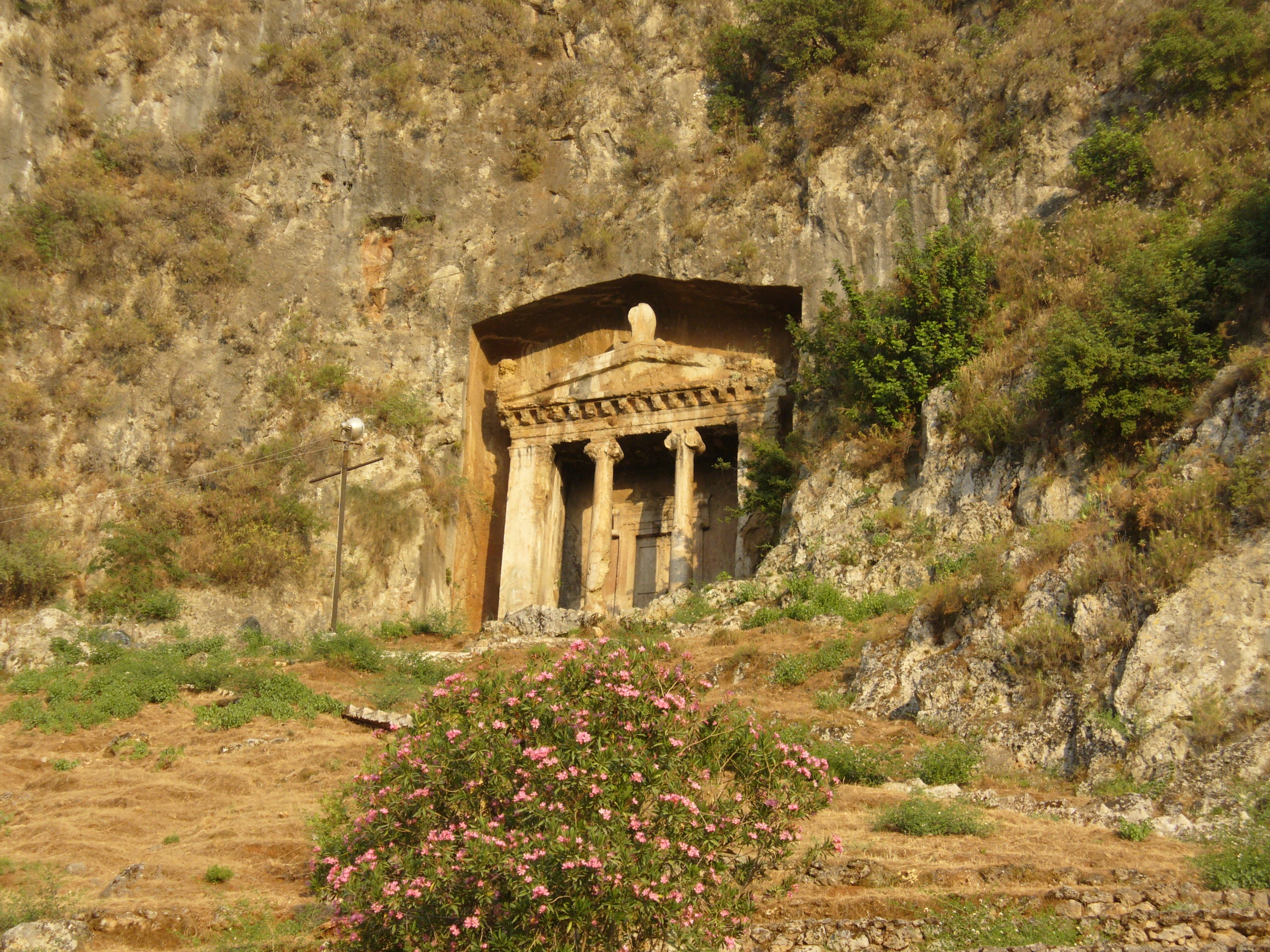
Tomb of Amyntas, Fethiye

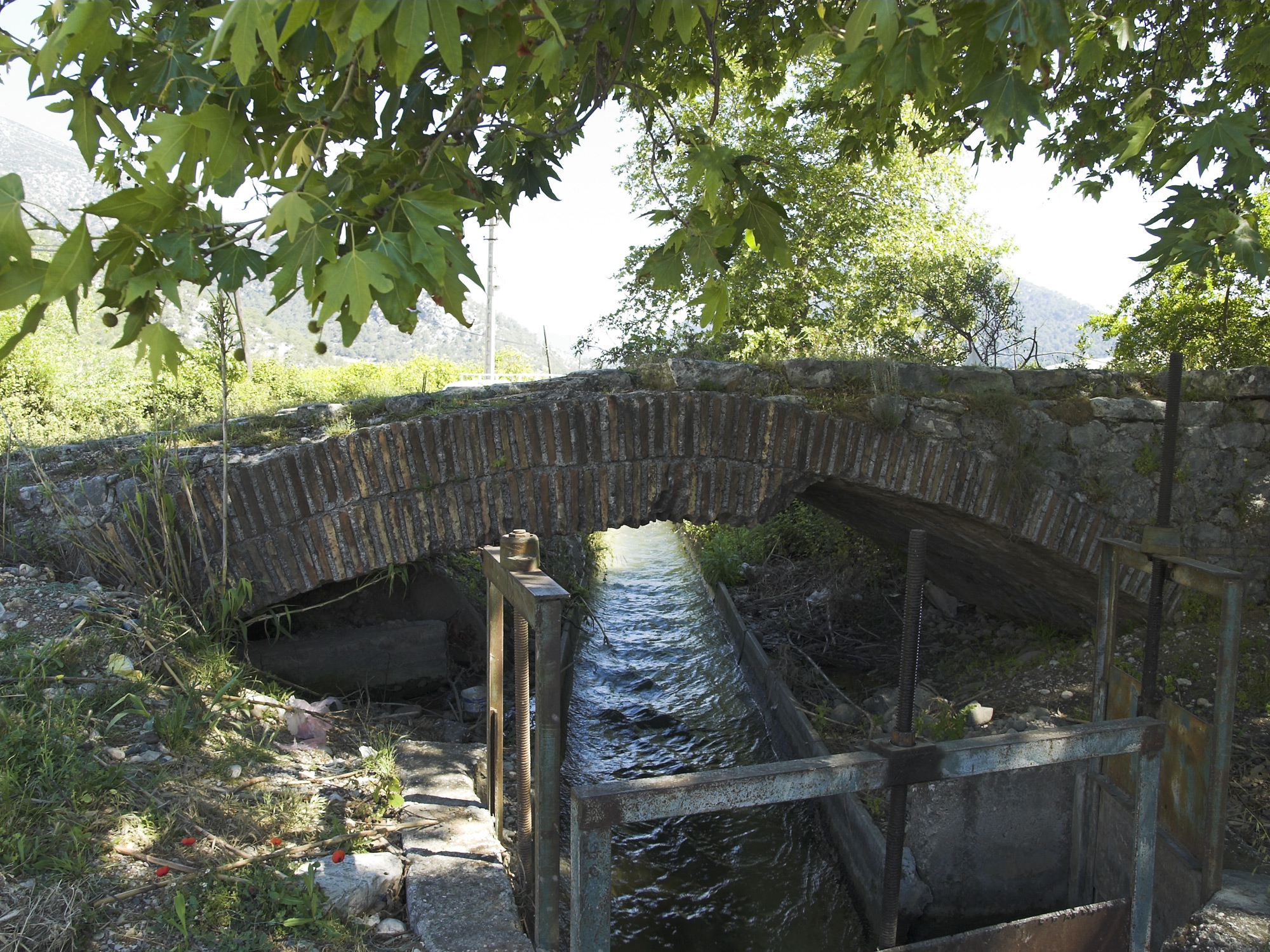
Ancient bridge near Limyra

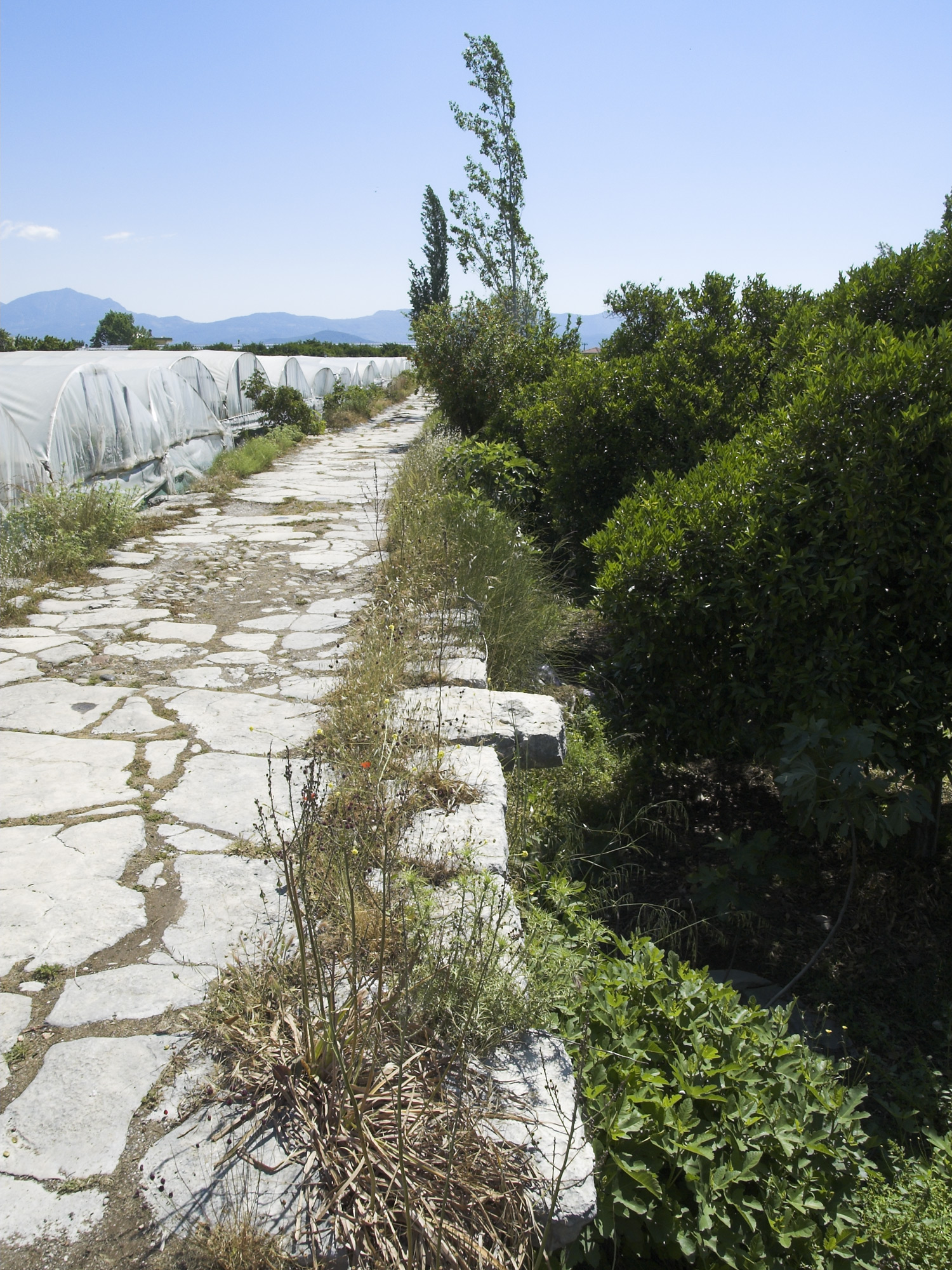
On the bridge near Limyra

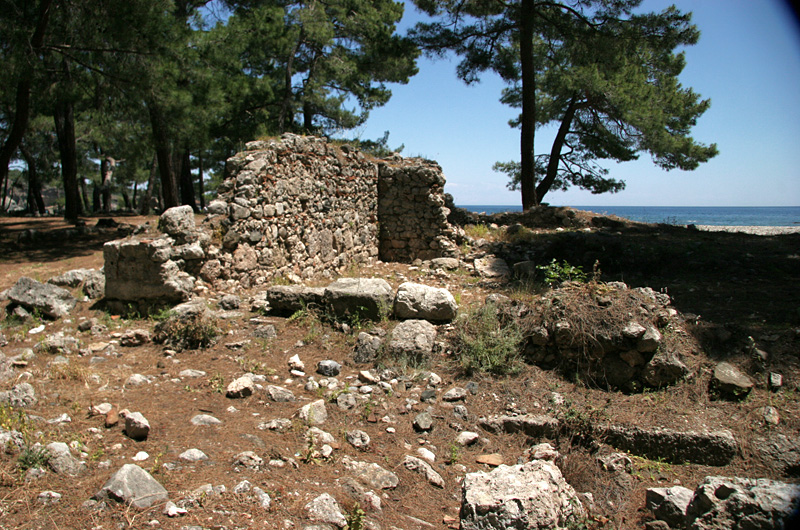
Ruins in ancient Phaselis

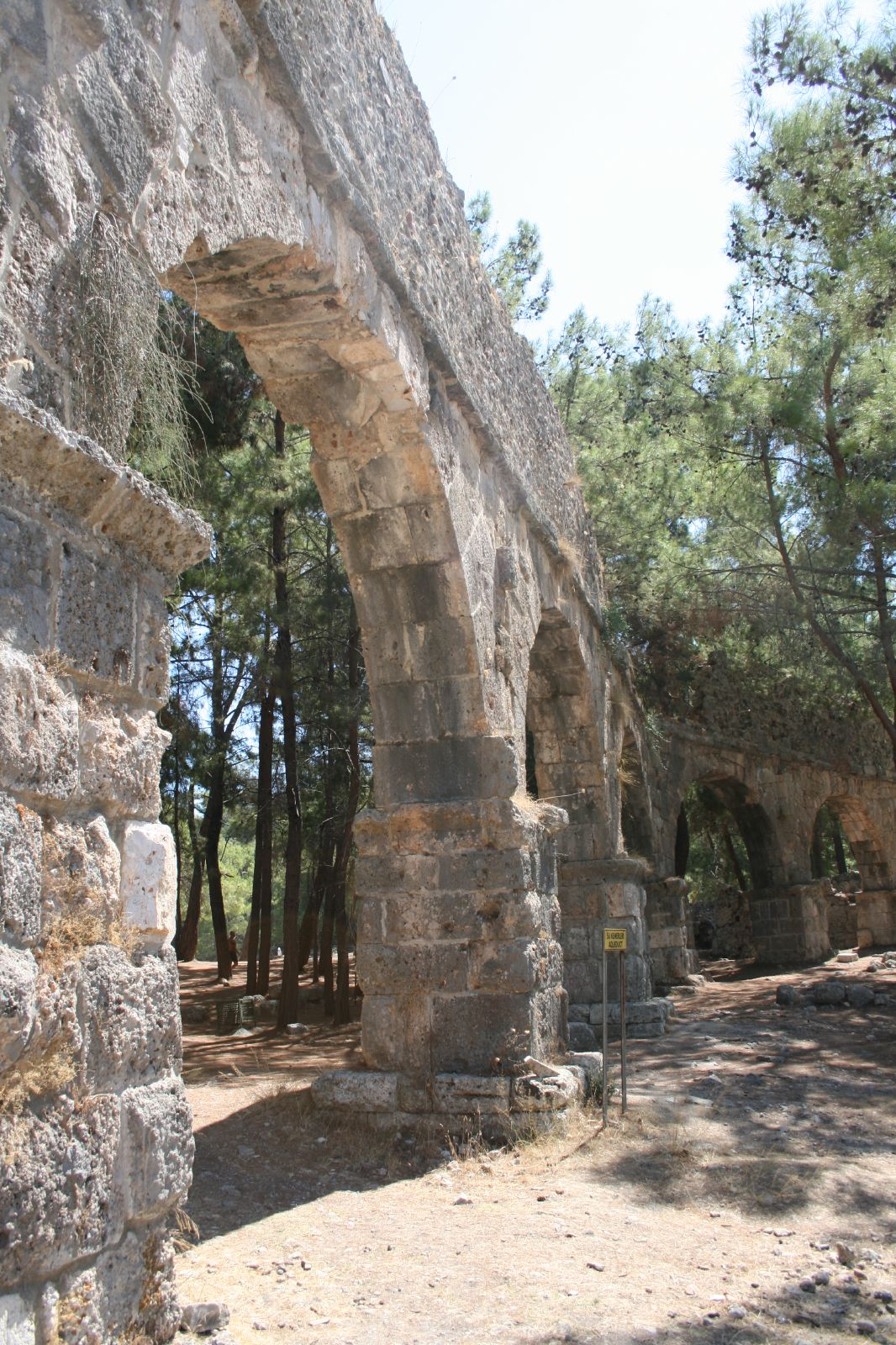
Aqueduct at Phaselis

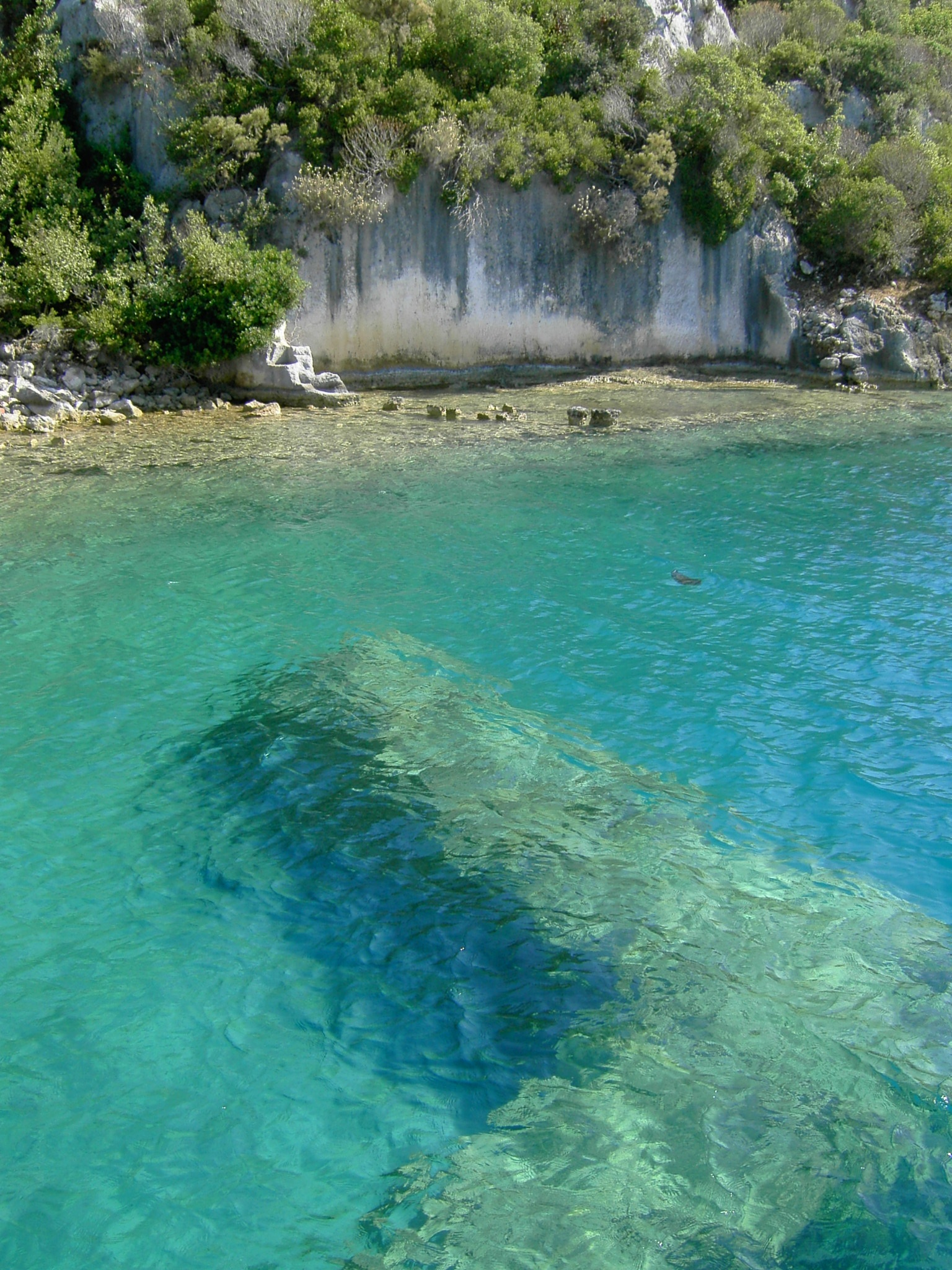
Part of the partially sunken settlement on Dolchiste Island

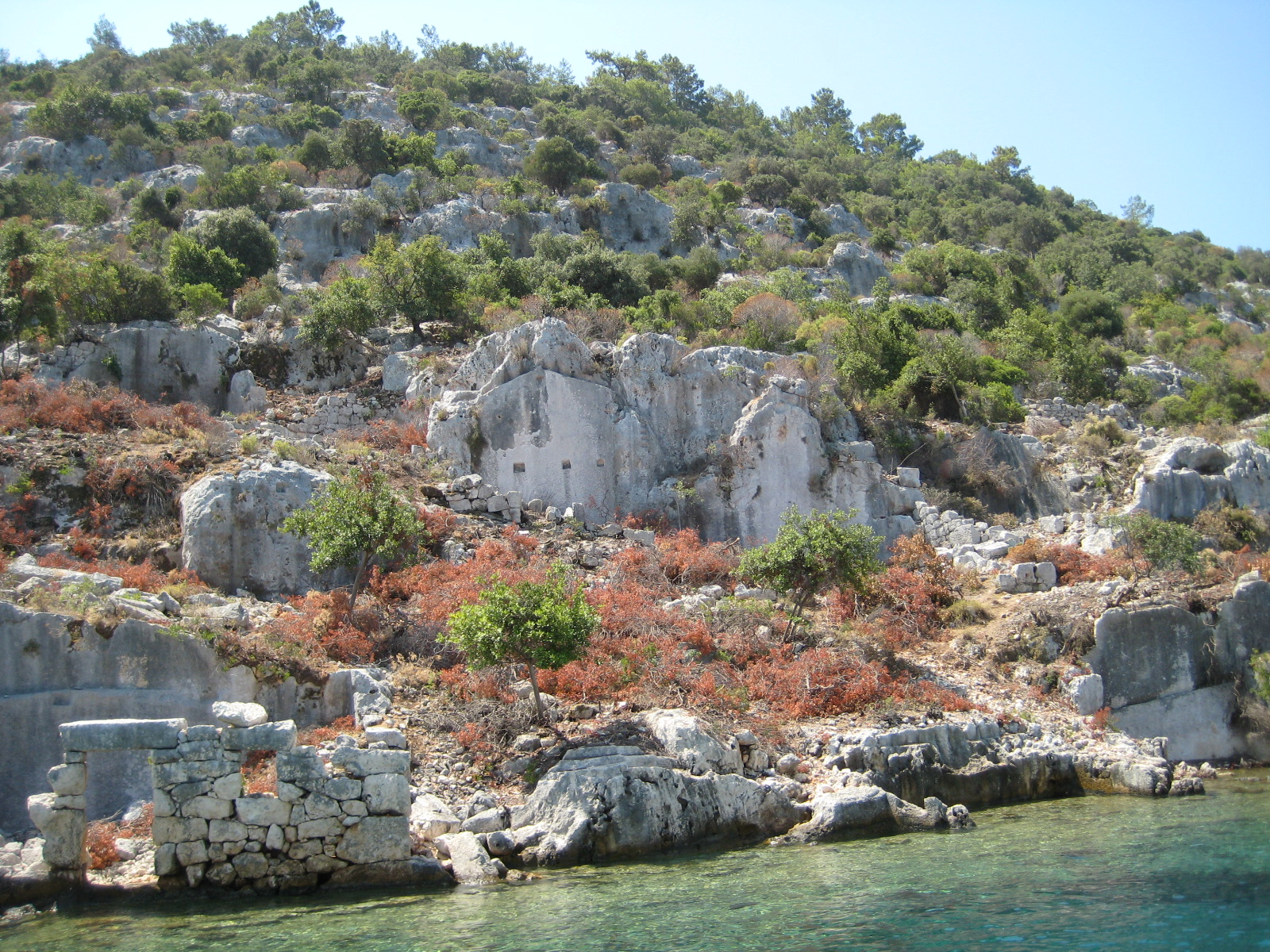
Ruins on Kekova Island

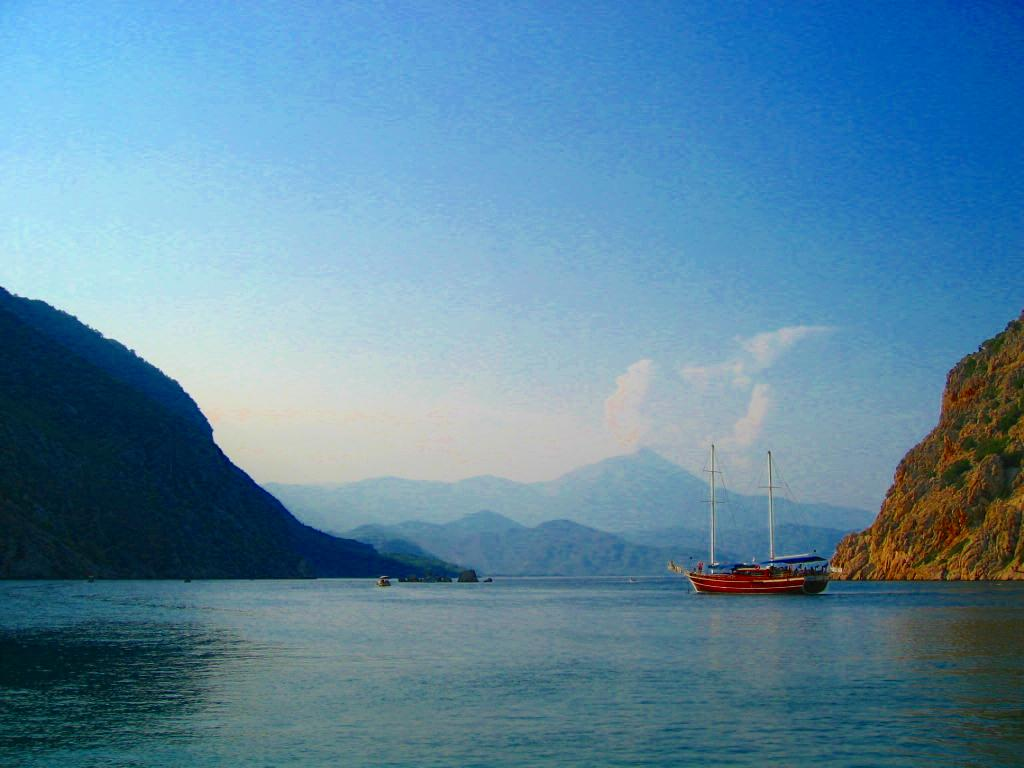
Tahtali Daği, "Mount Olympus"

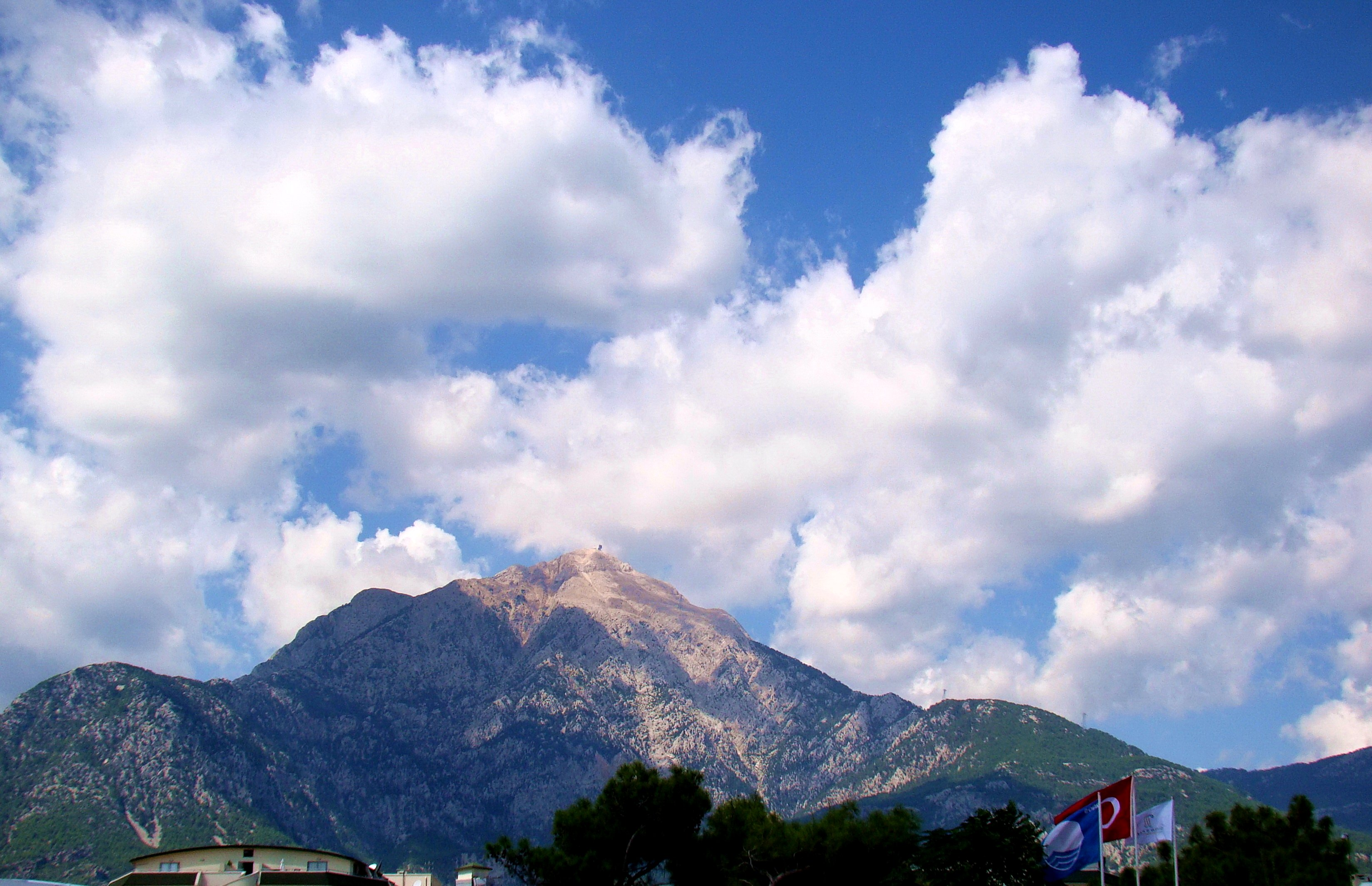
Tahtali Daği

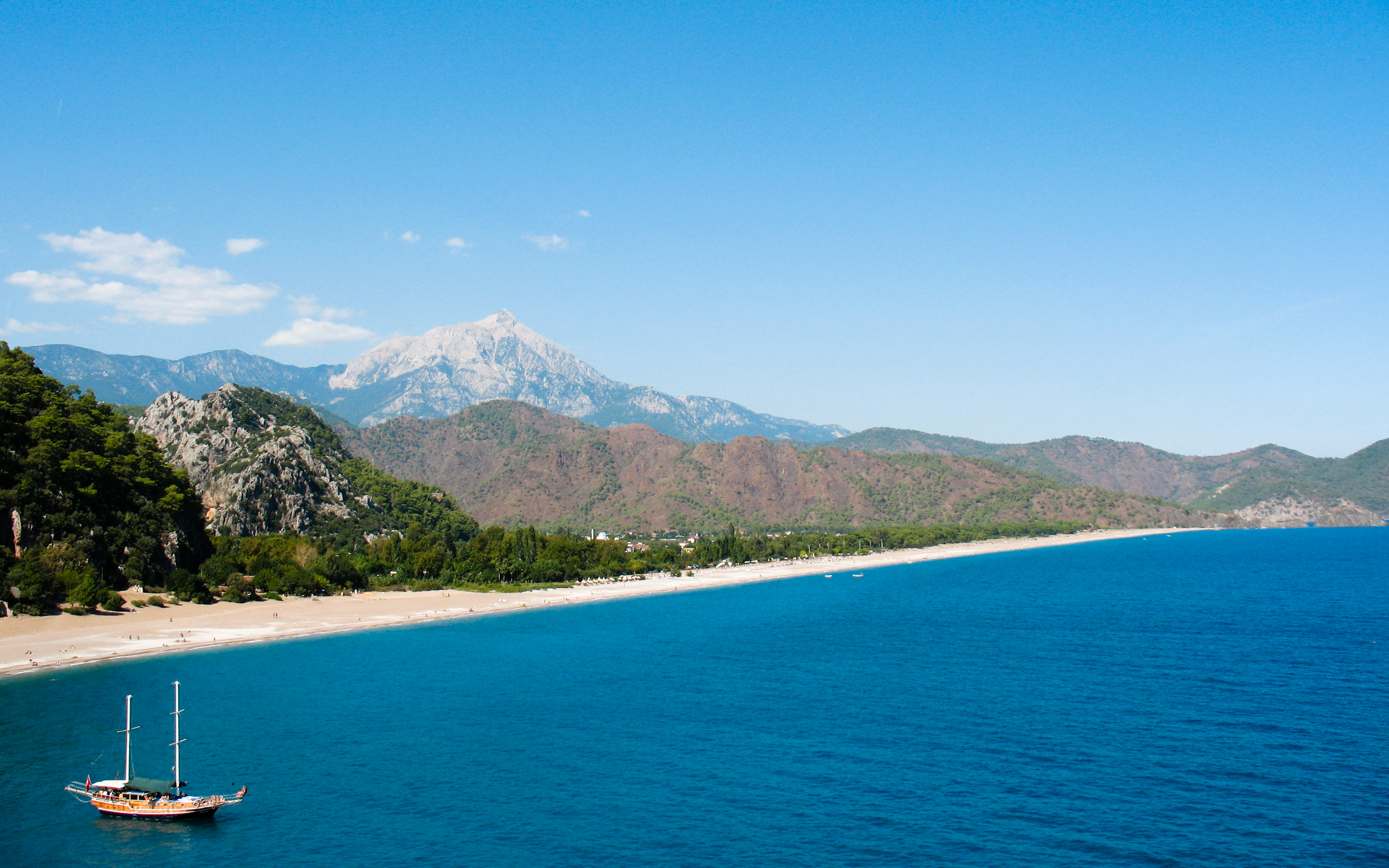
Olympus Beach, mountain in background

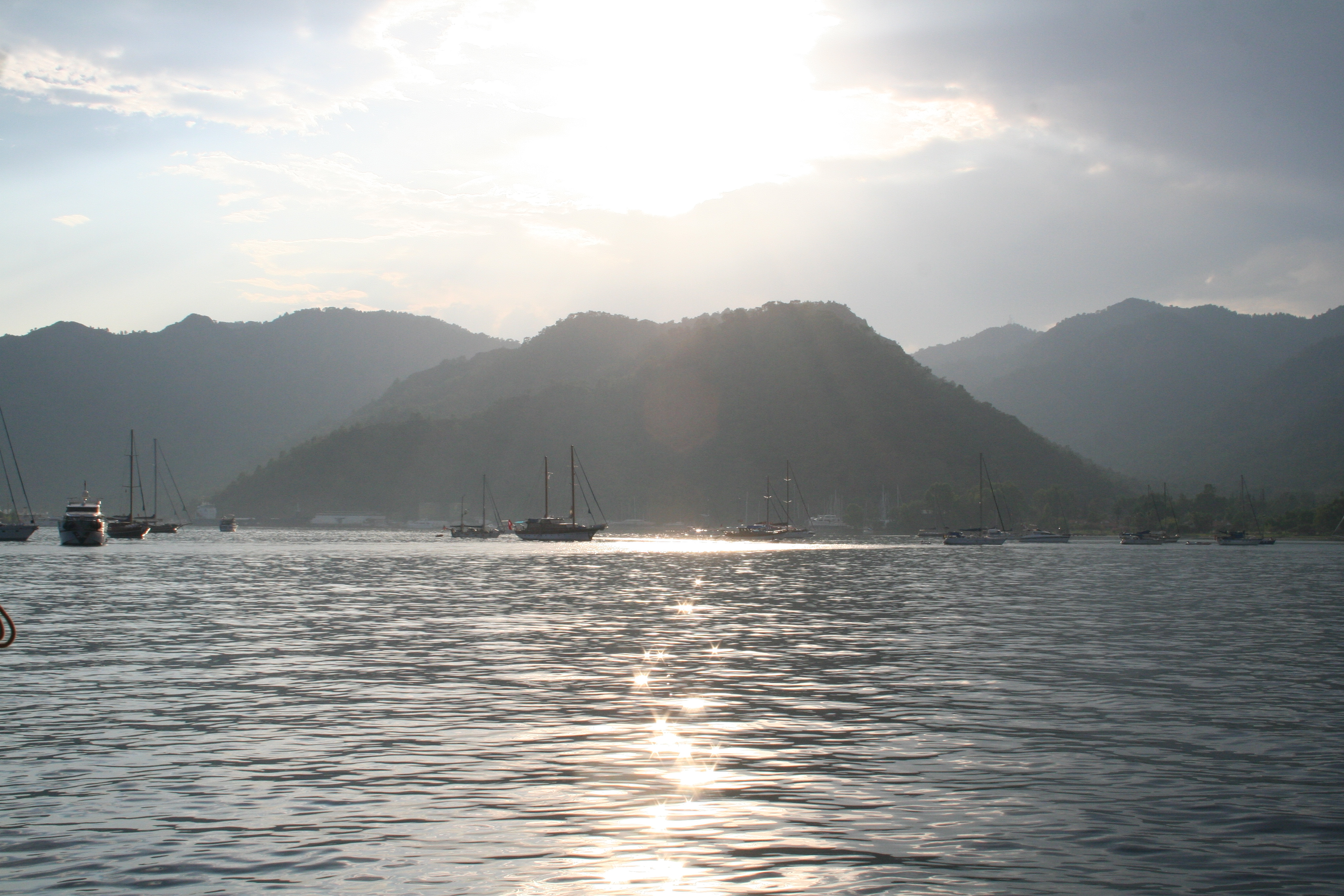
Göcek near Fethiye, Turkish Riviera, looking into the mountains of Lycia

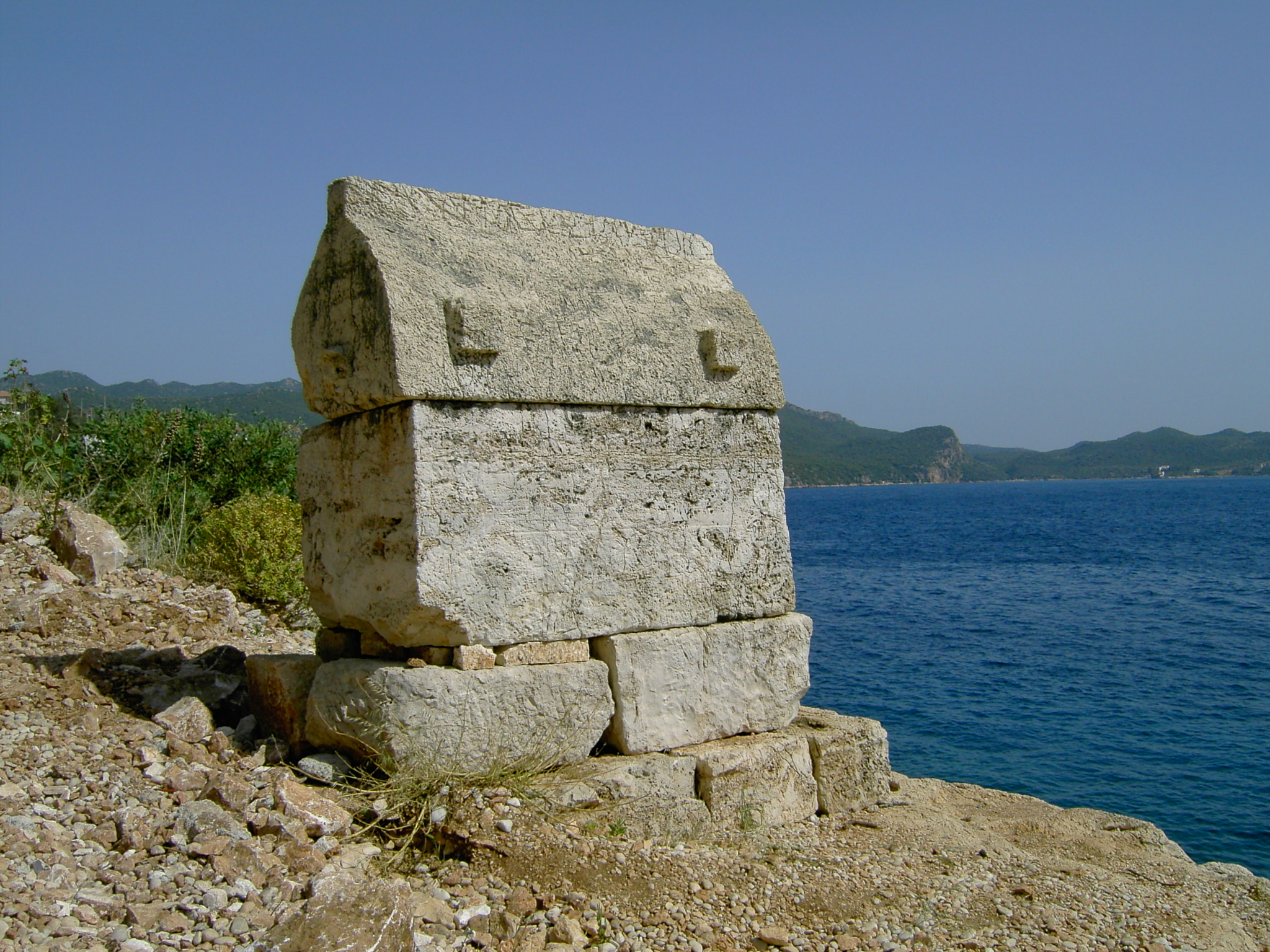
Kaş

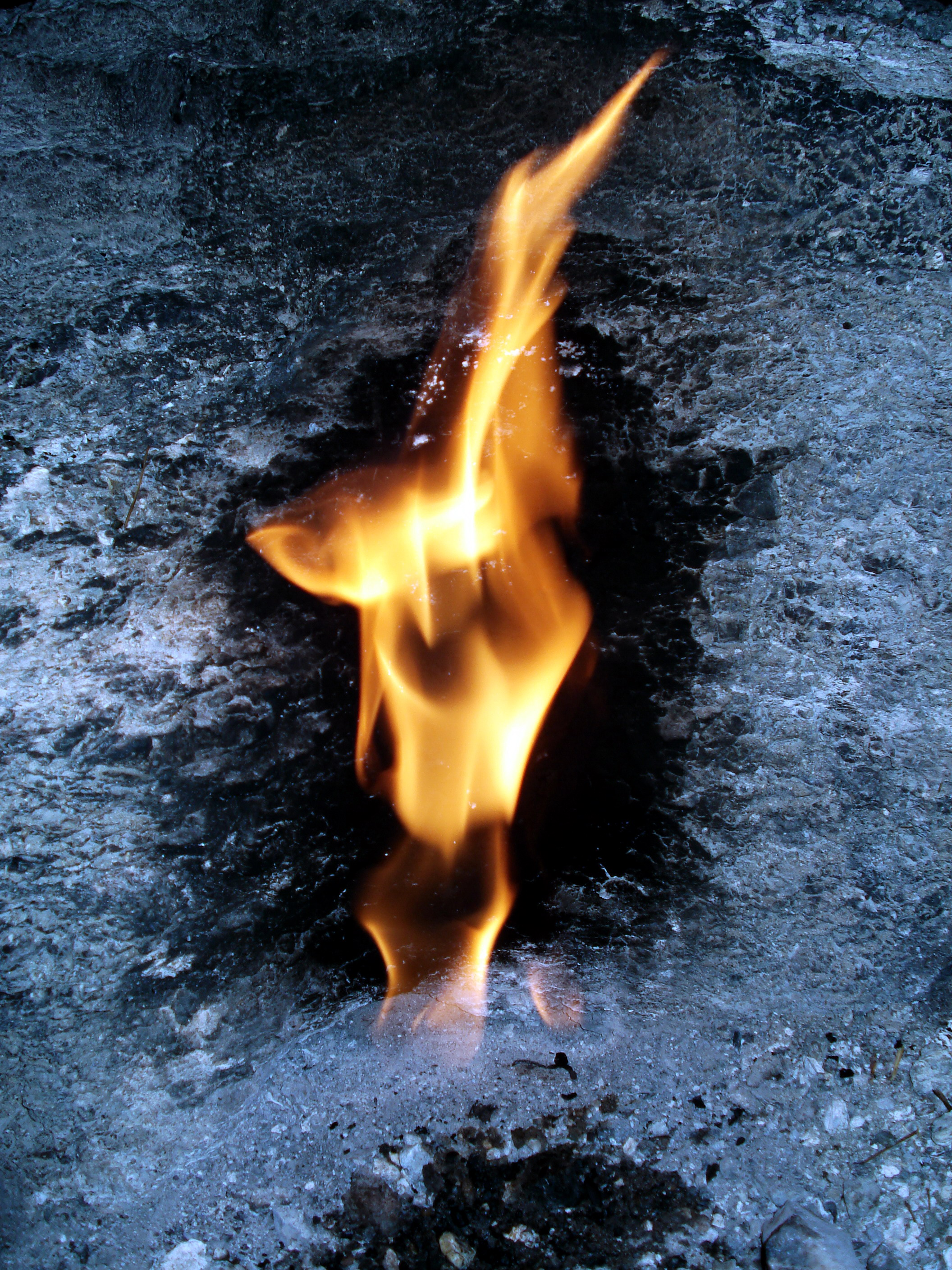
An eternal flame of Chimaera Mountain

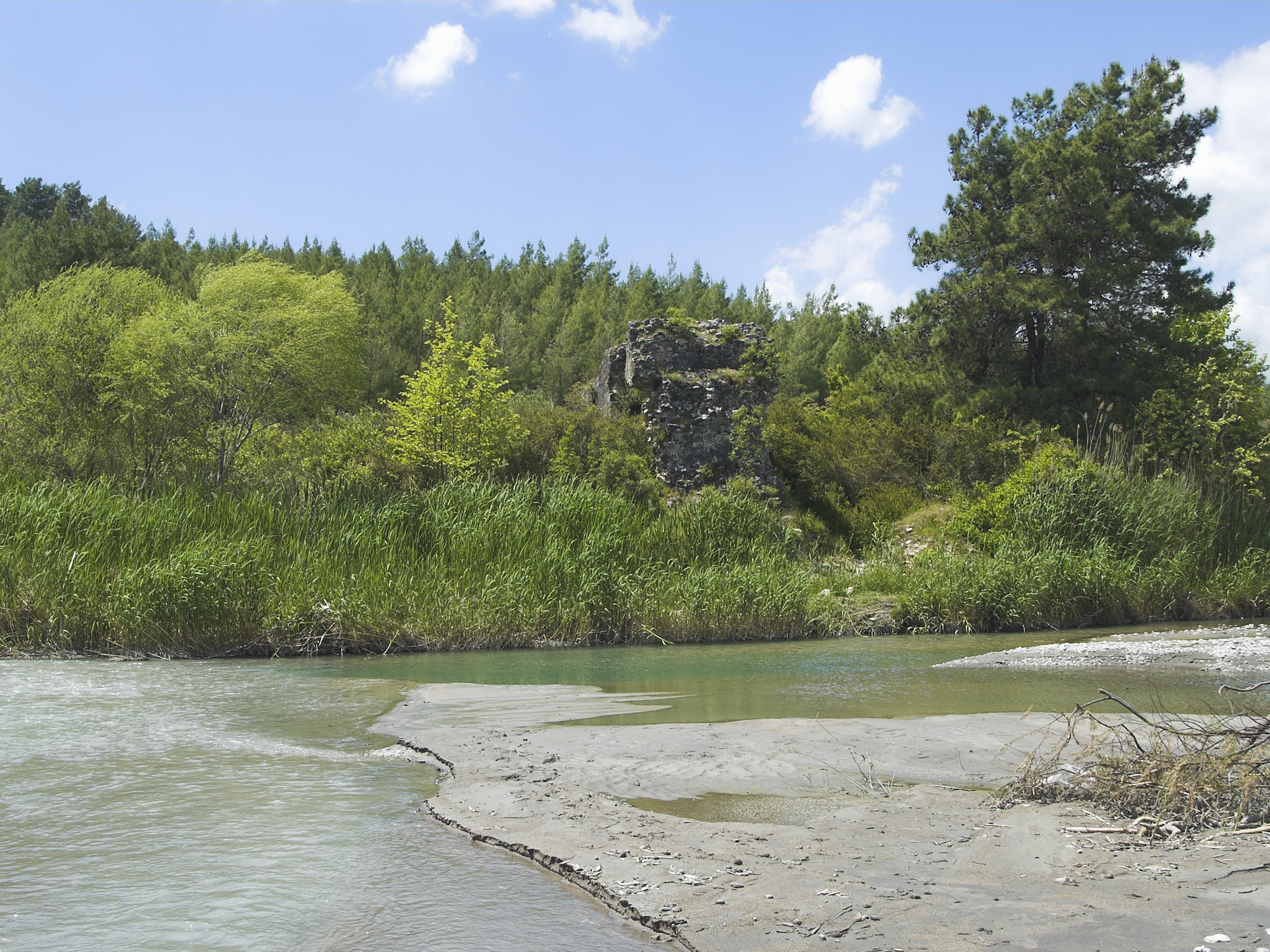
Kemer Bridge (not near the city) over the Xanthus

This article contains a list of Lycian place names that have survived from ancient Lycia in Anatolia. Names of settlements and geomorphic features are known from ancient literary sources. Ptolemy's Geography lists places in Asia Minor and specifically Lycia. Strabo's Geography has a section on Lycia as well, as does Pliny's Natural History. Stephanus of Byzantium includes a large number of Lycian places in Ethnica. Hierocles in Synecdemus lists the cities in the eparchy of Lycia. William Martin Leake's Journal of his own trips through Anatolia, as well as of those of many other travellers, with analyses of sources, mainly Ptolemy, is still a valuable source of information on the locations and appearances of the Lycian sites. In addition, numerous inscriptions in the Lycian language state some place names in their Lycian forms. The topographical information comes from the Aydın thesis, and was developed from Turkish military maps.

This article does not address the task of defining Lycia. Over a thousand or more years, the borders of the historical territory, called Lycia in English, are not likely to have remained invariant. This list includes places named by some source at some time as "Lycian", and also any settlement with a Lycian language name, even though located in some other city-state. "Lycia" therefore represents a maximum territory, to which any historical Lycia was never exactly identical.

Aydın studied 44 out of 78 known ancient settlements. Many more archaeological sites are not identifiable with ancient settlements. Aydın also collected information on 870 Turkish settlements over the same region. The moderns, certainly, populate the region much more densely than the ancients.

Some of the modern place names are given in Turkish. For the most part, the equivalent English, French or German pronunciations are good approximations, but Turkish has some letters not present in those languages. ⟨Ğ⟩ or ⟨ğ⟩ is not pronounced as an English ⟨g⟩ (/g/ or /dʒ/). When between vowels, it acts as a glide, facilitating vowel sequences, and otherwise it lengthens the preceding vowel. For example, dağ ('mountain') is pronounced [daː]. ⟨Ç⟩ or ⟨ç⟩ is /tʃ/ as in "child" (/tʃaɪld/); ⟨Ş⟩ or ⟨ş⟩ is /ʃ/ as in "shore" (/ʃɔ(ː)ɹ/). ⟨C⟩ or ⟨c⟩ is actually /dʒ/ as in "John" (/dʒɒn/), while the ⟨J⟩ or ⟨J⟩ is pronounced as the ⟨z⟩ in "azure" (/æʒəɹ/) and the ⟨s⟩ in "treasure" (/tɹɛʒəɹ/). The vowels have a short rather than a long pronunciation. As Turkish is an agglutinative language, the endings do not have the same meanings; e.g., the plural of dağ is dağlar ([daːlaɾ]).

Contents: Top · 0–9 A B C D E F G H I J K L M N O P Q R S T U V W X Y Z

== A ==
English classical name	Inscriptional name	Description	Sources
Acalessus		Greek Akalessos	Stephanus, Hierocles, who has Akalisos.
Acarassus		Greek Akarassos	Stephanus
Aedesa River		Turkish Ak Çay.	Pliny the Elder
Agathe Island		Greek Agathe.	Stephanus
Alimala		Greek Alimala	Stephanus
Alina Island		Greek Alina.	Stephanus, an island belonging to Crya.
Amelas			Pliny the Elder
Andriaca		36°13′46.6″N 29°57′30.6″E, Greek Andriake, 2.543 km (1.580 mi) from Tugluc, elevation 0.	Ptolemy, Pliny.
Anticragus Mountain		Greek Antikragos, Turkish Buba Dağ.	Strabo.
Antiphellus		Greek Antiphellos, Turkish Kaş	Ptolemy, Strabo, Pliny, who says it was formerly Habessus, Stephanus, Hierocles.
Aperlae	Apr and prl	36°9′43.5″N 29°47′19.9″E, elevation 56 m (184 ft). Greek Aperlai, a former port of Lycia, Turkish Siçak Iskelesi, the docks on Aperlai Bay, 4.11 km (2.55 mi) from Kiliçli.	Lycian name from coins. Listed in Ptolemy as Aperroe, in Pliny as Aperræ. Hierocles has Aperlai.
Apollonia Island		Greek Apollonia, Turkish Sıçak.	Stephanus
Aptera		Greek Aptera	Stephanus
Araxa	Araththi	Greek Araksa, located at Turkish Ören on the Xanthus River.	Ptolemy, Stephanus, Hierocles. The Lycian name is from coins.
Argais Island		Greek Argais	Stephanus
Arna			See Xanthus
Arneae		Greek Arneiai.	Stephanus, who calls it a "small city" and says that Homer called it Orneiai.
Arsinoe		Greek Arsinoe	Stephanus
Artymnesus		Greek Artumnesos	Stephanus
Arycanda	Arykawanda	Greek Arukanda, located at Aykiriçay in Antalya Province.	Stephanus, Hierocles.
Arycandus River		Greek Arukandos, Turkish Karasu Çay.	Pliny, who says it is a tributary of the Xanthus.
Ascandalis; Ascandiandalis			Pliny the Elder; Pliny
Aspalathis Island		Greek Aspalathis	Stephanus
Aspis Island		Greek Aspis	Stephanus
Aulae		Greek Aulai	Stephanus

== B ==
English classical name	Inscriptional name	Description	Sources
Balbura		Greek Balboura, Turkish Çölkayaği or Çölkayiği	Ptolemy, Pliny, Stephanus
Balura		Greek Baloura.	Hierocles
Bubon		Greek Boubon, Turkish Ibecik.	Ptolemy, Pliny, Stephanus, who says it is Homer's Boudeion, Hierocles.

== C ==
English classical name	Inscriptional name	Description	Sources
Cabalia		A region	Ptolemy, Strabo, who calls it Cabalis, and says it contains Oenianda, Balbura, Bubon. The Solymi lived there and the Lydians of Cibyra settled there. Part was in Milyas, part in Pisidia, and part in Rhodian territory, as well as in Lycia.
Cabessus		Greek Kabessos	Stephanus
Cadianda	Khadawãti	Greek Kaduanda, near Üzümlü.	
Cadrema			Stephanus
Calbius Spring		Greek Kalbios Krene.	Stephanus says that some say it is Kalainon.
Callatebus		Greek Kallatebos	Stephanus
Calinda		Greek Kalunda, Turkish Kozpınar.	Listed in Ptolemy in coastal Lycia
Canas			Pliny the Elder
Candyba	Khãkba	Greek Kanduba, close to Gendive.	Ptolemy, Pliny. Possibly the same as Hittite Hinduwa. Named for the son of Deucalion, according to Stephanus. Hierocles.
Cannus			Listed by Ptolemy as a coastal town
Carbana		Greek Karbana	Stephanus
Carmylessus		adjacent to Kaya	Strabo says it is a settlement on a ravine of Anticragus Mountain.
Carya			Listed by Ptolemy as a coastal town
Carysis Island		Greek Karusis.	Stephanus, island belonging to Crya.
Caunus	Khbide	Greek Kaunos, a major city and seaport near Dalyan	Ptolemy lists the city as part of Doris, meaning Dorian Anatolia, near the Lycian border. Hierocles.
Chelidoniae Islands		Greek Chelidoniai, Turkish Beş Adalar.	Strabo says there are three off the promontory, one with a landing for vessels.
Chelidonia Promontory		Greek Hiera Akra, "Sacred promontory," Turkish Gelidonya Burnu.	Ptolemy, who calls it cliffs, and Strabo, who says the continuous chain of the Taurus Mountains start here.
Cherrhonesus Promontory		Greek Cherrhonesos Akra	Stephanus
Chimaera Ravine		Avlan valley.	Strabo says it is a ravine "extending up from the shore."
Chimaera Mountain		Turkish Yanartaş.	Pliny speaks of an eternal flame, which turns out to be a steady stream of inflammable gas.
Chlyda			Listed by Ptolemy as a coastal town
Choma		Near Sarılar.	Ptolemy, Pliny, who says it is on the Aedesa, Hierocles.
Chrysaor		Greek Chrysaoris.	Stephanus says this is a Carian city with substantial Lycian residents.
Cibyra		Greek Kibura, abandoned site north of Gölhisar.	Strabo. An independent city, ruler of the Tetrapolis, never politically part of Lycia, but housing a population element speaking the language of the Solymi. The state was called the Cibyratis.
Cisthene island and town			Strabo
Climax Mountain		Greek Klimaks	Strabo
Cochliousa Island		Greek Kochliousa	Stephanus
Comba		Greek Kombe	Ptolemy, Hierocles has Kombe.
Comistaraus		Greek Komistaraos.	Hierocles
Corycus		Greek Korukos	Described by Strabo as a stretch of coast.
Corydalla		36°22′5.9″N 30°18′4.6″E, Greek Korudalla, 424 m (1,391 ft) from Kumluca. Elevation 30 m (98 ft), not a mountain village.	Ptolemy, a mountain village of Pliny.
Cragus (KP)		Greek Kragos, a monetary district of Lycia	It had its own coinage. Implied by Ptolemy's "near the Cragus mountains."
Cragus Mountain		Greek Kragos, Turkish Avdancık or Sandak Dağ.	Pliny, Ptolemy, Strabo, who says it has eight promontories.
Cragus		Greek Kragos.	Strabo mentions a city of the same name as the mountain.
Crambusa			Strabo
Crya		Greek Krua	Stephanus
Cyaneae		36°15′10.5″N 29°49′45.7″E, elevation 653 m (2,142 ft), Greek Kuaneai, 350 m (1,150 ft) from Turkish Yavı.	Pliny the Elder
Cydna			Ptolemy

== D ==
English classical name	Inscriptional name	Description	Sources
Daedala		Greek Daidala. A known archaeological site at Inlice Asari on an uninhabited hill in the countryside about 2.5 mi. to the northeast of Göcek.	A coastal town in Ptolemy, under Rhodes in Strabo and Stephanus, who says it was named after Dedalus.
Daedala Mountain		Kizildağ	A mountain within Lycia on the western border, in Strabo, Stephanus.
Daphne			Stephanus
Dias			Stephanus
Dolchiste island		Greek Dolchiste, Turkish Kekova.	Ptolemy, Stephanus.
Doliche Island		Greek Doliche.	Stephanus, who relates that Alexandros says it is the same as Dolchiste Island, but Callimachus does not.
Drepana			Stephanus

== E ==
English classical name	Inscriptional name	Description	Sources
Edebessus		Greek Edebessos	Stephanus
Elaiou Teichos			Stephanus
Elebesus		Greek Elebesos.	Hierocles
Eleutherai			Stephanus
Ereuates			Stephanus
Eudocia		Greek Eudokia	Hierocles

== G ==
English classical name	Inscriptional name	Description	Sources
Gagae		36°17′56.4″N 30°21′17.3″E, elevation 34 m (112 ft). Greek Gagai, located at Yali, within Mavikent, within Kumluca. This is not, however, a mountain community. Opinions vary.	A mountain village in Pliny, an old fort in Stephanus. Hierocles has Gaga.
Glaukou demos			Stephanus says it was named after the hero, Glaucus.

== H ==
English classical name	Inscriptional name	Description	Sources-
Henoanda		Greek Henoanda.	Hierocles
Hiera			See Chelidonia Promontory
Hephæstium			City located by Pliny below Chimaera Mountain
Hippou Kome		Turkish İtasar.	Stephanus
Hoauapus		Greek Hoauapos.	Hierocles
Hylami		Greek Hulamoi.	Stephanus
Hytenna		Greek Hutenna	Stephanus

== I ==
English classical name	Inscriptional name	Description	Sources
Ilaris			Stephanus
Isinda	Isñta	Located at Belenli, or, at another period, Alaettin Mahalle, Korkuteli.	Strabo

== L ==
English classical name	Inscriptional name	Description	Sources
Lamyra		Greek Lamura	Stephanus
Lamyrus River		Greek Lamuros	Stephanus
Limyra	Zẽmuri	Greek Limura, a coastal city	Ptolemy, Strabo, Pliny, Stephanus, Hierocles.
Limyrus river		The Alakır Çay.	Ptolemy, Strabo, Pliny.
Lycia	Trm̃mis	Greek Lukia, the ancient region now in Turkey.	Listed in Ptolemy and numerous classical texts and inscriptions, as well as being the Lukka lands of Late Bronze Age Hittite and Egyptian inscriptions.
Lycian Promontory			Pliny. See Chelidonia Promontory.

== M ==
English classical name	Inscriptional name	Description	Sources
Macra Island		Greek Makra, Turkish Meğri Ada.	Stephanus
Masicytus		A political unit of Lycia	It had its own coinage. Implied by Ptolemy's "near the Masicytus mountains."
Masicytus mountains		Greek Masikytos, Turkish Alaca Dağ.	Ptolemy lists without coordinates, Pliny has Masycites.
Megale Island		Greek Megale.	Stephanus
Megiste		Ancient Greek Megiste, modern Greek Kastellorizon.	Strabo, Stephanus, who place it on the island, same name.
Megiste Island		Ancient Greek Megiste, Modern Greek Megiste, belongs to Greece.	Ptolemy, Strabo, Stephanus.
Melaenae		Greek Melainai	Stephanus
Melanippion		Greek Melanippion, on Turkish Karaöz Limanı.	Stephanus
Menedemion			Stephanus
Meroe			Stephanus
Milias		Greek Miluas, Anglicised to Milyas. A district located on an alpine plain near Bay Dağ, identified by the Greek name on an inscription.	Ptolemy, Strabo.
Misai		Misae	Hierocles
Molyndeia		Molundeia	Stephanus
Myra		36°15′47.1″N 29°58′37.0″E, elevation 239 m (784 ft), Greek Mura, 295 m (968 ft) from Sumeli in Demre.	Strabo, Pliny, Stephanus. Hierocles has Myra Metropolis.

== N ==
English classical name	Inscriptional name	Description	Sources
Nisa			Ptolemy
Noscopium			Pliny the Elder

== O ==
English classical name	Inscriptional name	Description	Sources
Octapolis			Listed in Ptolemy
Oenoanda	Hieroglyphic Luwian Wiyanawanda	Turkish İncealiler.	Ptolemy, Stephanus, Pliny as Oenianda
Olympus		Turkish Deliktaş. Also called Hadrianopolis.	Listed by Ptolemy, Strabo, Pliny.
Olympus, Mountain		Tahtalı Dağ.	Strabo, who says it is also called Phoenicus.

== P ==
English classical name	Inscriptional name	Description	Sources
Patara	Lycian Pttara, Hieroglyphic Luwian Patara, Hittite Patar.	36°15′58.0″N 29°18′54.3″E, elevation 2 metres (6.6 ft), Greek Patara, a port city, capital of the Lycian League, at Turkish Gelemiş. Also named Arsinoe.	Ptolemy, Strabo, Stephanus, Hierocles.
Perdicia		Greek Perdikia	Village and harbor in Stephanus
Phaselis		36°31′35.2″N 30°32′53.3″E, elevation 9 m (30 ft). 3,190 m (1.98 mi) from Egelkoyu in Tekirova.	Ptolemy, Strabo, who says it is a city with three harbors and a lake.
Phasydis		Greek Phasudis.	Hierocles
Phellus	Wehñta	Greek Phellos, at Turkish Çukurbağ.	Ptolemy, Strabo, Pliny, Stephanus, Hierocles.
Phoinkous Island			Stephanus, "an island against Lycia."
Phrixus		Greek Phriksos	Stephanus
Physcia		Greek Phuskia	Stephanus, a mountain city
Pinara	Lycian Pilleñni, Hieroglyphic Luwian Pinali	Near the village of Minara in the Xanthus Valley.	Ptolemy, Strabo, Pliny, Stephanus, who says it is a large city under Cragus. Hierocles.
Plateis Island		Greek Plateis.	Stephanus
Podalia		Greek Podalia, Turkish Söğle.	Ptolemy, Pliny, Stephanus, Hierocles.
Pyrra			Pliny the Elder

== R ==
English classical name	Inscriptional name	Description	Sources
Rhengcylias		Greek Rhegkulias	Hierocles
Rhax Island		Greek Rhaks	Stephanus
Rhoge Island		Greek Rhoge, Turkish Kara Ada.	Stephanus
Rhodia		36°22′38.0″N 30°16′31.7″E, elevation 44 m (144 ft), not a mountain village. Greek Rhodia, near Kumluca.	Stephanus, Ptolemy, Pliny, who calls it Rhodiopolis, and a mountaian village.

== S ==
English classical name	Inscriptional name	Description	Sources
Sacred Promontory			See Chelidonia Promontory
Sagalassus		Greek Sagalassos	Ptolemy, Strabo.
Sebeda		Greek Sebeda, Turkish Bayındır Liman.	Stephanus, town and harbor.
Sidake		Greek Sidake.	Stephanus
Sidarous		Greek Sidarous, Turkish Ceneviz Limanı.	Stephanus, town and harbor
Sidene		Greek Sidene	Stephanus
Sidyma		36°24′36.9″N 29°11′30.1″E, elevation 545 m (1,788 ft). Greek Siduma, Turkish Dodurga.	Ptolemy, Strabo, who says it was on a mountain. Stephanus, Hierocles.
Simena		36°11′41.2″N 29°51′49.7″E, elevation 13 m (43 ft), 1.513 km (0.940 mi) from Kaleüçağız.	Stephanus, Pliny.
Sindia		Greek Sindia	Stephanus, possibly the same as Strabo's Sinda near or in Cabalis.
Scari		Greek Skaroi	Stephanus
Sirbis River			See Xanthus River.
Solyma Mountain		Turkish Güllük Dağ.	Strabo. Elsewhere he calls it Solymus and says it is above Termessus.
Sura Oracle	Surezi	Greek Soura, Turkish Sura.	Stephanus
Syessa Sanctuary to Leto		Greek Suessa	Stephanus
Symbra			Ptolemy

== T ==
English classical name	Inscriptional name	Description	Sources
Taurus Mountains		Greek Tauros, Turkish Toros Dağları	Strabo, who says they start at Cape Chelidonia.
Telandrus		Turkish Tersane.	Pliny the Elder
Telephian Community		Greek Telephios Demos	Stephanus, a community at the spring.
Telephus Spring		Greek Telephou Krene.	Stephanus
Telmessis Promontory		Greek Telmessis akra, Turkish Çamlı Burun.	Strabo says it is a promontory with a harbor. Stephanus.
Telmessus	Telebehi	36°37′21.3″N 29°6′41.4″E, Greek Telmessos, at Turkish Fethiye, elevation 6 m (20 ft).	Ptolemy, Strabo, Pliny. Stephanus says it is a city of Caria, although expressing also the Lycian view. Hierocles has Telmisos.
Tenedos			Stephanus
Termera			Stephanus
Termessus	Trm̃mis	Greek Termēs(s)os	Described by Strabo as a city of Pisidia in the pass to Milyas. Same name as Lycia. Strabo says the Termessians are called the Solymi. Cibyra is just below and near Termessus.
Thryanda		Greek Thruanda	Stephanus
Tlos	Lycian Tlãñna, Hieroglyphic Luwian Talawa	36°33′51.9″N 29°25′14.8″E, elevation 370 m (1,210 ft). Greek Tlos, near Turkish Düğer.	Ptolemy, Strabo, Pliny, Stephanus. Hierocles has Tlo.
Trauala		Greek Trauala.	Stephanus
Tymena		Greek Tumena	Stephanus says it is a village of Lycia.
Tymnessus	Tuminehi < *Tumine, * Tumini, or *Tumina	Greek Tumnessos.	Stephanus says it is a city of Caria but the citizens were Lycian at first.

== X ==
English classical name	Inscriptional name	Description	Sources
Xanthus	Lycian Arñna, Hieroglyphic Luwian Awarna, and possibly Arinna	Greek Ksanthos, the largest city of Lycia, the site of present-day Kınık, Antalya Province, Turkey.	Listed in Ptolemy, Hierocles, Strabo, who says it was later called Arsinoe, and Pliny. Stephanus says it was called Arna before Xanthus.
Xanthus river	Hittite Siyanti	Turkish Esen Çay.	Listed by Ptolemy, Strabo, who says it was formerly the Sirbis, and Pliny.
