= Aptera =

Aptera may refer to:

== Biology ==
- "Aptera" in the 10th edition of Systema Naturae by Carl Linnaeus, an obsolete taxonomic order under taxonomic class Insecta
- Aptera (cockroach), a genus of cockroaches in the family Blaberidae
- Apteromantis aptera, a species of praying mantis, endemic to the Iberian Peninsula
- Hopea aptera, a species of plant in the family Dipterocarpaceae, endemic to Papua New Guinea
- Inga aptera, a species of legume in the family Fabaceae, found only in Brazil
- Parashorea aptera, a species of plant in the family Dipterocarpaceae, endemic to Indonesia

== Places ==
- Aptera (Greece), the city in Crete
- Aptera (Lycia), an ancient city in Lycia, now Turkey

== Other uses ==
- Aptera Motors, an American high-efficiency vehicle company
  - Aptera (solar electric vehicle), a solar powered three wheeler from Aptera Motors announced in 2019

== See also ==
- Apterygota, a subclass of small, wingless insects
