= Daedala (city) =

City in ancient Caria

Coordinates: 36°44′58″N 28°58′36″E

Daedala or Daidala (Greek: τὰ Δαίδαλα) was a city of the Rhodian Peraea in ancient Caria, or a small place, as Stephanus of Byzantium says, on the authority of Strabo.

The eastern limit of the Rhodian Peraea was the town of Daedala, and after Daedala, which belongs to the Rhodii, is a mountain of the same name, where commences the line of the Lycian coast: near the mountain, that is, on the coast, is Telmissus, a town of Lycia, and the promontory Telmissis. The ruins of Daedala are placed near the head of the gulf of Glaucus, on the west side of a small river named Inigi Chai, which seems to be the river Ninus, of which Alexander the Great in his Lyciaca tells the legend, that Daedalus was going through a marsh on the Ninus, or through the Ninus river, when he was bitten by a water snake, and died and was buried there, and there the city Daedala was built and was named after him.

The valley through which the Ninus flows, is picturesque, and well-cultivated. On the mountain on the west side of the valley is an ancient site, probably Daedala: here are numerous tombs hewn in the rocks in the usual Lycian style; some are well-finished. The acropolis stood on a detached hill; on its summits are remains of a well, and a large cistern. Though no inscriptions were found at the site, there is hardly any doubt that the place is Daedala. Pliny mentions two islands off this coast belonging to the Daedaleis. There is an island off the coast east of the mouth of the Inigi Chai, and another west of the mouth of the river; and these may be the islands which Pliny means. The islands of the Cryeis, three according to Pliny, lie opposite to Crya, on the west side of the gulf of Makri. Livy mentions Daedala as a parvum castellum. Ptolemy places Daedala, and indeed the whole of the west side of the gulf of Glaucus, in Lycia.

Its site is located near İnlice Asarı.

== See also ==
- List of Lycian place names
