= Crya =

Town of ancient Lycia

Coordinates: 36°40′36″N 28°51′25″E

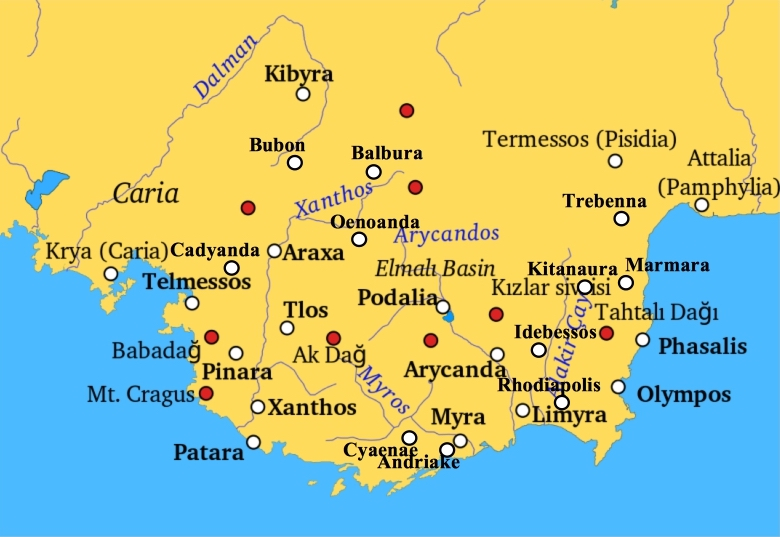
Cities of ancient Lycia

Crya or Krya (Greek: Κρύα; also Carya) was a city of ancient Lycia and was a polis (city-state) and a member of the Delian League.

Its exact location is not known, but it is located near Taşyaka, Muğla Province, Turkey.

Stephanus of Byzantium quotes the first book of the Epitome of Artemidorus: "...and there are also other islands of the Cryeis, Carysis and Alina".

Pliny who may have had the same or similar reference, calls it Cryeon tres, by which he means that there were three islands off or near to Crya; but he does not name them. Pliny places Crya in Caria, and he mentions it after Daedala, under the name of Crya fugitivorum. According to his description it is on the gulf of Glaucus. The Stadiasmus Maris Magni places it, under the name Κρούα, 160 stadia from Telmissus to the west. Pomponius Mela speaks merely of a promontorium Crya. In Ptolemy the name is written "Carya", and it is assigned to Lycia.
