= Tymena =

Ancient Lycian village

Tymena (Ancient Greek: Τύμηνα) was a village of ancient Lycia.

Its site is unlocated.
