= Menedemium =

Menedemium or Menedemion (Ancient Greek: Μενεδήμιον) was a town of ancient Lycia.

Its site is unlocated.
