= Ascandiandalis =

Ascandiandalis was a town of ancient Lycia.

Its site is unlocated.
