= Glaucus (river of Asia Minor) =

Glaucus (Greek: Γλαῦκος) is the name of no fewer than four rivers of Asia Minor noted by authors in classical antiquity.

1. A tributary of the Phasis in Colchis, now called Tchorocsou. (Strab. xi. p. 498; Plin. vi. 4.) The Phasis is now called the Rioni, and Colchis is in the modern republic of Georgia.
2. A right tributary (mod. Oltu Çay) of the Acampsis (mod. Çoruh), in Pontus (Turkey). (Ptol. v. 6. § 7.)
3. A tributary of the Maeander in Phrygia, not far from Eumeneia. (Plin. v. 29.) There are coins with the name of this river. (Leake, Asia Minor, p. 157.) Nowadays the river has dried up except for springs at Işıklı (Eumeneia).
4. A river in Lycia, on the frontier of Caria, which empties itself into the bay of Telmissus, whence that bay is sometimes called Sinus Glaucus. (Plin. vi. 29; Quint. Smyrn. Posthom. iv. 6, foil.; Strab. xiv. p. 651.) The modern name of the bay is Makri. Steph. B. mentions a δῆμος Γλαύκου, which was probably a place on the banks of the river.
