= Noscopium =

Town of ancient Lycia

Noscopium was a town of ancient Lycia.

Its site is un located.
