= Amelas =

Town in ancient Lycia

Amelas was a town in ancient Lycia. Coins were minted there, some of which are in the British Museum. The location of Amelas is in doubt.
