= Aptera (Lycia) =

Aptera (Ancient Greek: Ἄπτερα) was a town of ancient Lycia, mentioned by Stephanus of Byzantium.

Its location has not been determined.
