= Corydalla =

Corydalla may refer to:

- Corydalla Vigors, 1825, a junior synonym of Anthus, a genus of birds
- Corydalla Walker, 1857, a junior synonym of Agyrta, a genus of moths
- Corydala, a city of ancient Lycia
