= Tahtalı Dağı =

Mountain in Turkey

- Lycian Olympus
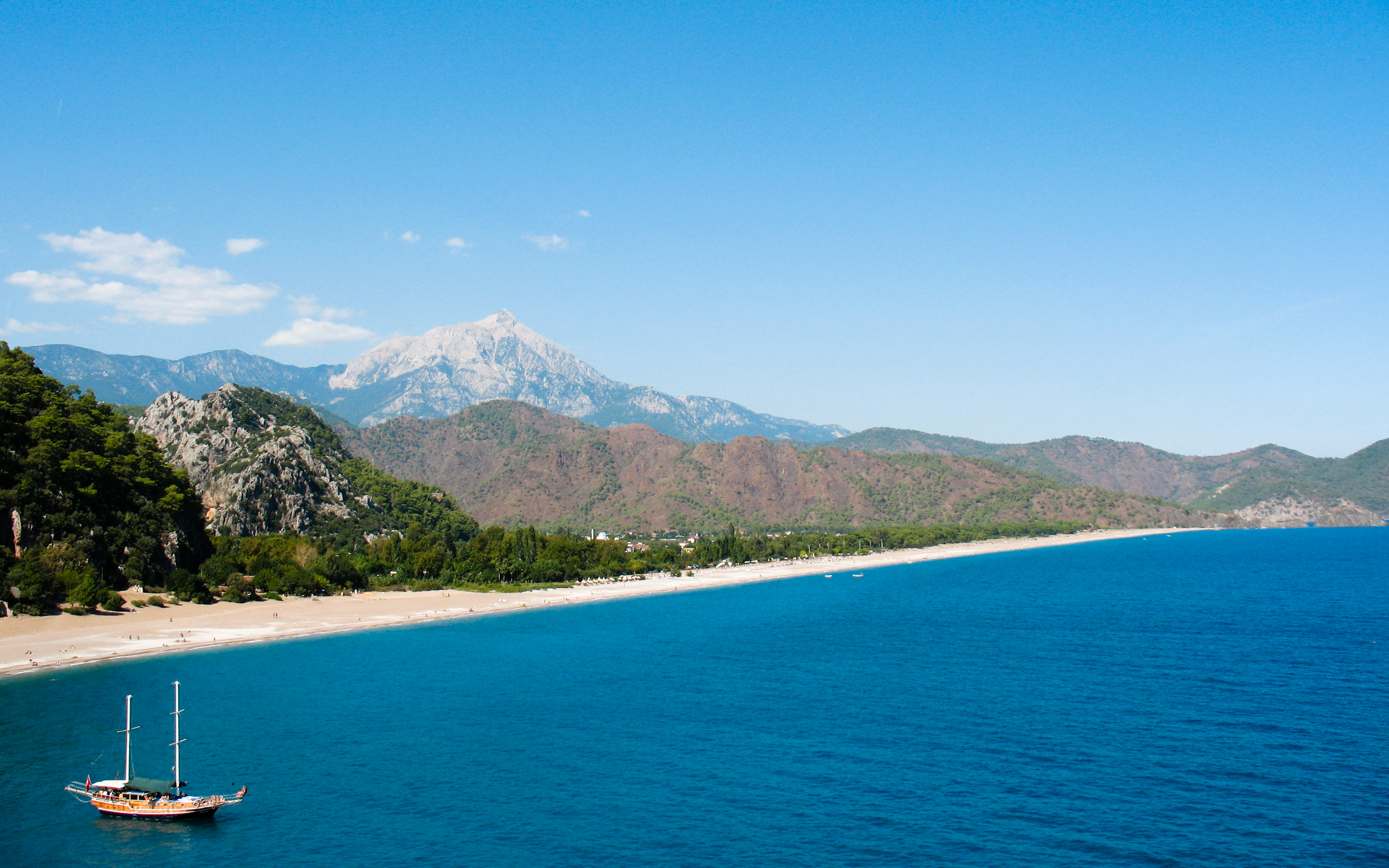
- View of the coast at Olympos with Tahtalı Dağı in the background

Highest point
- Elevation: 2,366 m (7,762 ft)
- Coordinates: 36°32′13″N 30°26′31″E

Geography
- Location within Turkey
- Location: Antalya Province, Turkey
- Parent range: Western Taurus Mountains

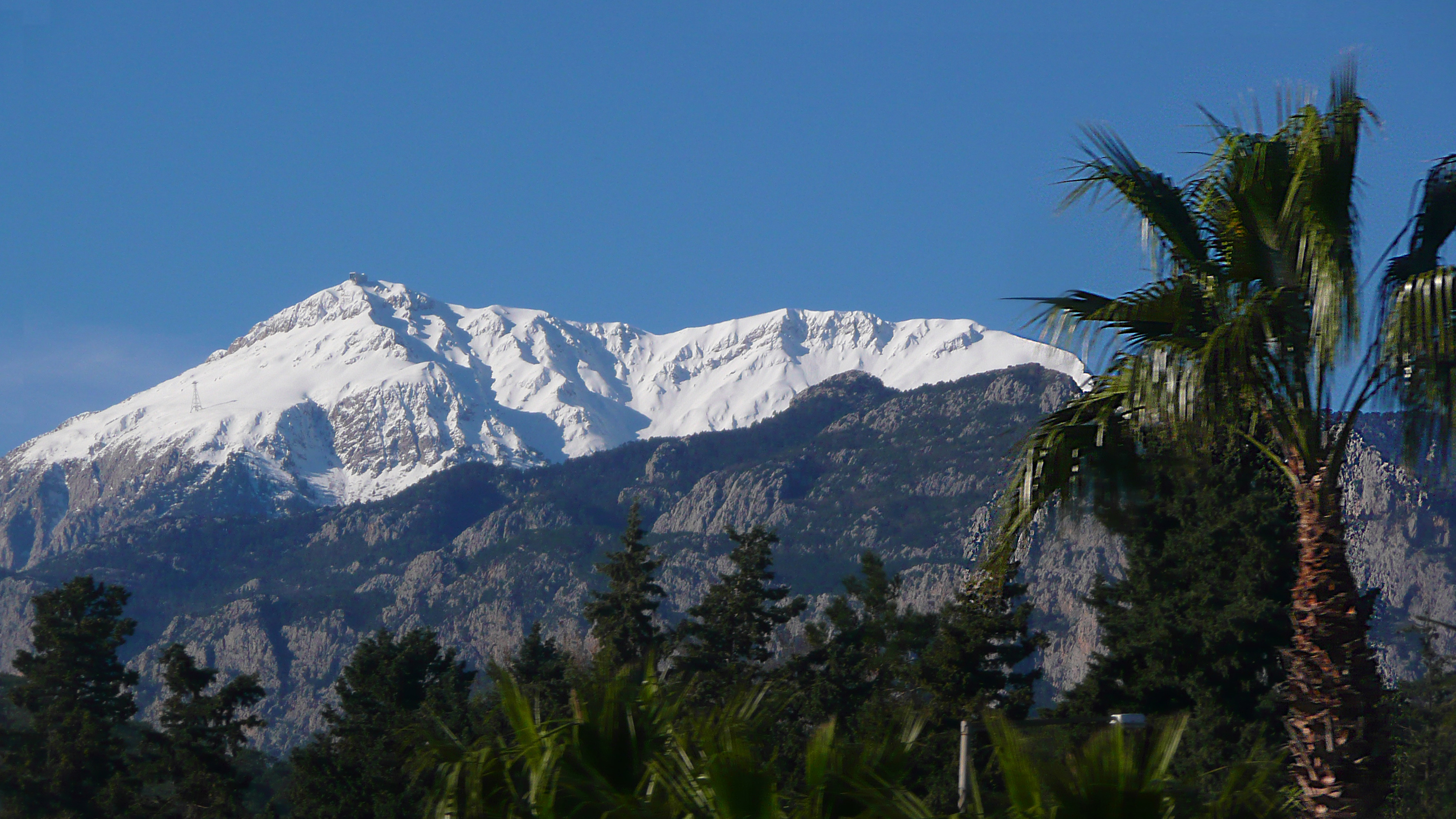
The summit of Tahtalı Dağı in spring with cable car (left)

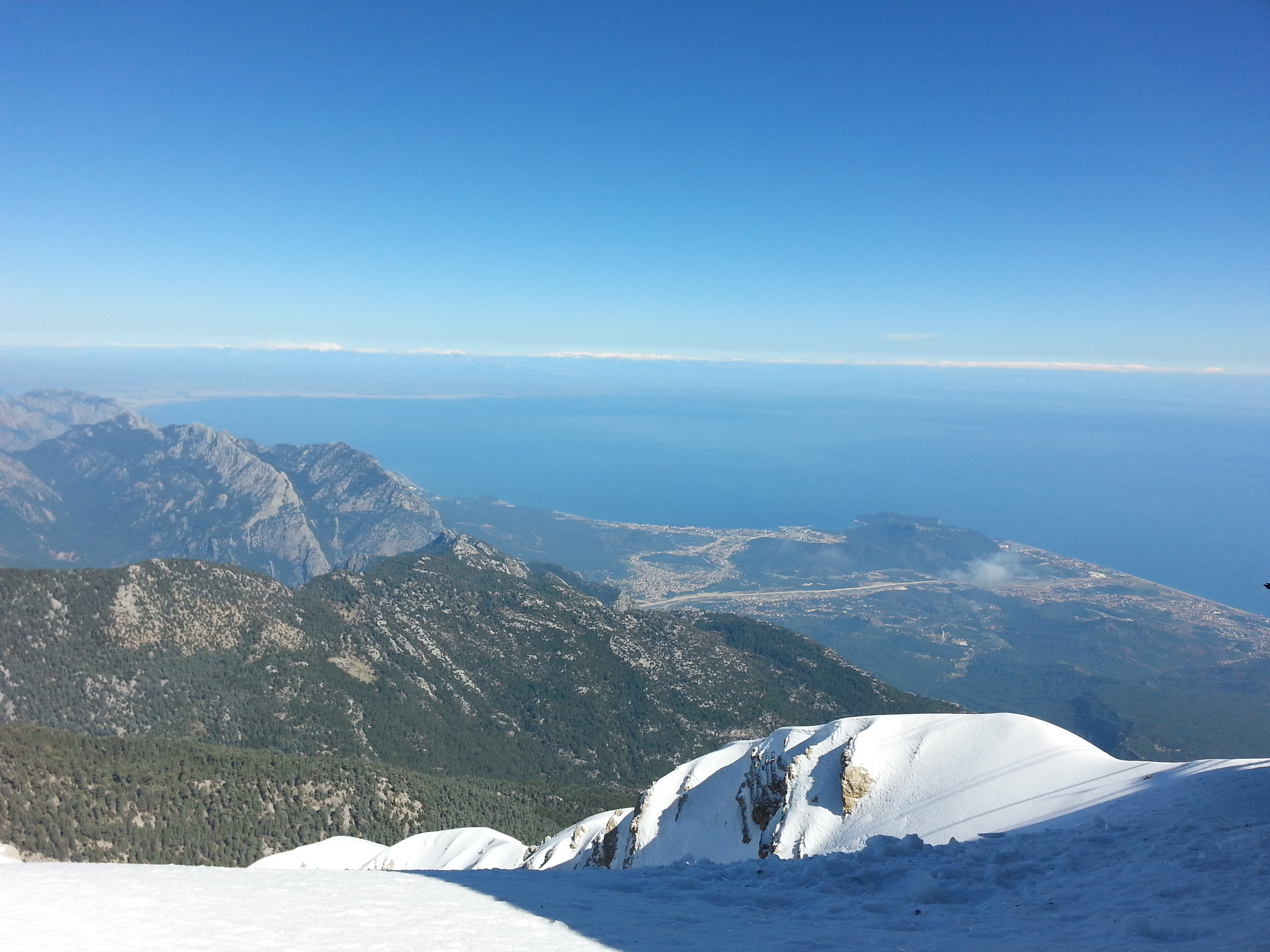
View from the summit

Tahtalı Dağı, also known as Lycian Olympus, is a mountain near Kemer, a seaside resort on the Turkish Riviera in Antalya Province, Turkey. It was known as Olympus (Ancient Greek: Ὄλυμπος; also transliterated as Olympos) and Phoenicus or Phoinikous (Ancient Greek: Φοινικοῦς) in ancient times. It is part of the Beydağları Coastal National Park. Visitors can ascend the summit with the Olympos Aerial Tram. The Lycian Way long distance trail traverses the mountain.

== Geography ==
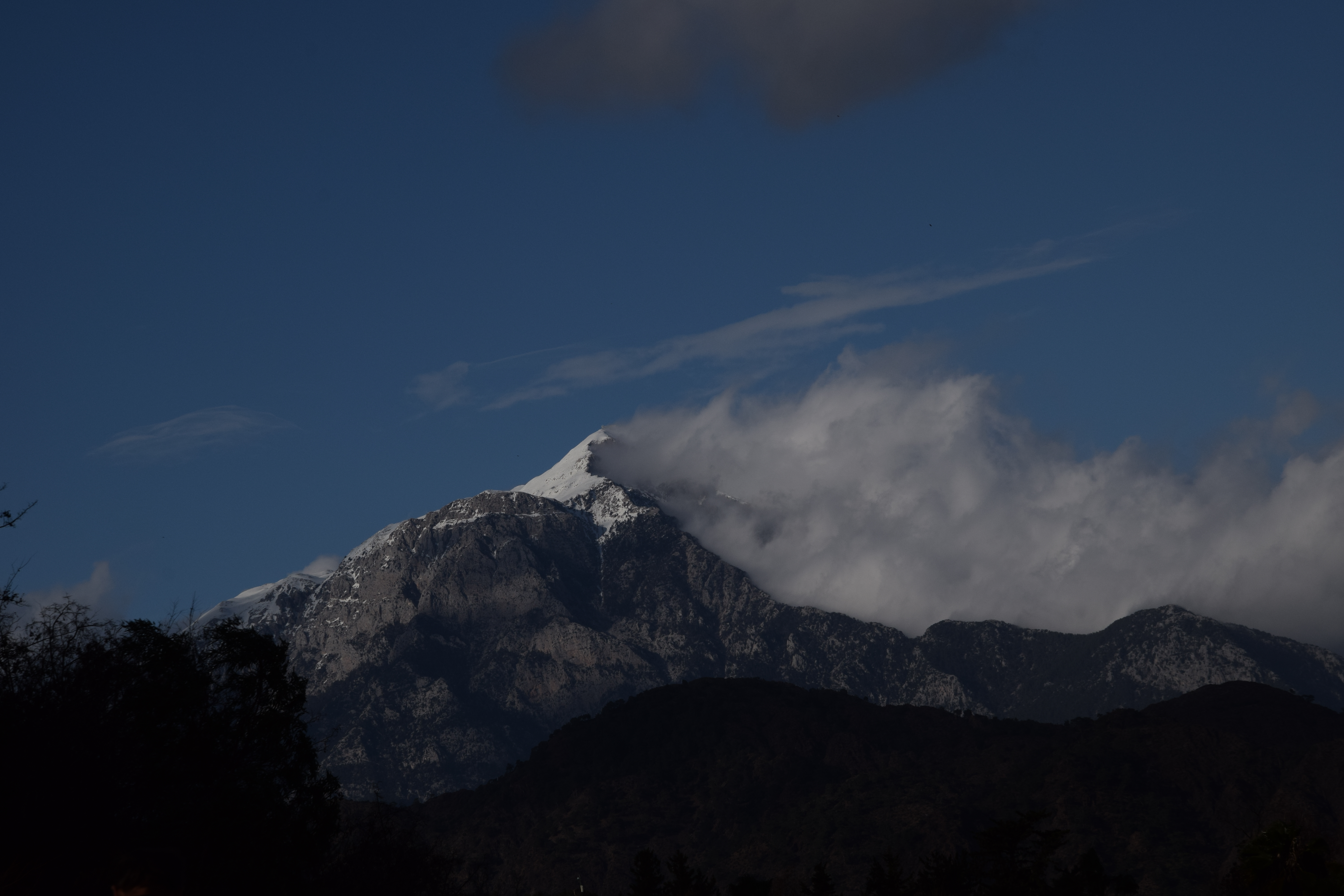
View of the summit of Tahtalı Mountain from Çıralı coast

Tahtalı Dağı lies on the east coast of the Teke Peninsula (Lycian Peninsula), dominating the landscape around Kemer. Located between Antalya and Finike and the dominant peak of the mountain range Bey Dağları (Turkish: Bey Mountains). From it, the start of the Taurus Mountains can be seen. Its close proximity to the coast of the Mediterranean Sea also make it visible from afar to mariners. It is the highest mountain in the Natural Park of Olympos - Beydağları - Milli Park. From November and often into June, the summit is covered with ice and snow. In spring dust in the Saharan winds color these peaks reddish brown. During summer they are often obscured by clouds. The tree line starts at about 1900 meters altitude.

== History ==
In ancient times the mountain was called Olympus, the home of the gods, a name it shares with many other high mountains. Nearby, was a town of the same name. On the Lycian Olympus stood a temple of Hephaestus. The Periplus of Pseudo-Scylax does not mention Olympus, but its Siderus is evidently no other place. The ruins of the ancient city of Phaselis lie at the foot of Tahtalı.

Today's Turkish name could derive from tahta (Turkish: wooden panel, wooden board), but more likely it derives from the Turkish taht ("throne" in Turkish, referring to Olympus as the throne of the Gods).

== Funicular Olympos Teleferik ==
The cable car company Olympos Teleferik, a Turkish-Swiss Cooperation, has been in operation since June 16, 2007. It owns one cable car line leading to the summit of Tahtalı. Its bottom station is located within 8 km of both Tekirova and Çamyuva on the eastern side of the mountain. With a length of 4350 meters, the Olympos Teleferik is one of the longer aerial tramways. It was built by the Doppelmayr / Garaventa Group, one of the leading companies in the design and manufacture of cable cars.

In order to transport the materials up the mountain, a simple ropeway was built. The materials consisted of approximately 3,700 cubic meters of concrete, 4,500 cubic meters of water, 420 tons of steel and 8,600 tons of gravel.

The funicular has two cabins able to transport up to 80 individuals and overcome the height difference of 1639 m within 10 minutes with the help of a 1000 kW engine. The cabins are carried by two supporting cables having a diameter of 51 mm which are pulled by a cord with a diameter of 38 mm. The cables pass the four cable car towers with a maximum speed of 10 m/s (36 km/h). This setup enables the Olympos Teleferik to transport up to 480 people per hour.

== Sources ==
- Strabo (2014) [1929]. Jones, H. L. (ed.). Geography. Vol. 14. Cambridge, Massachusetts: Harvard University Press. ISBN 978-0-674-99246-7.
