= Yenikışla =

Yenikışla may refer to the following places in Turkey:

- Yenikışla, Kumluca, a village in the district of Kumluca, Antalya Province
- Yenikışla, Ulus, a village in the district of Ulus, Bartın Province
