= Melanippe (Lycia) =

Ancient Lycian town

Coordinates: 36°15′18″N 30°24′18″E

Melanippe (Ancient Greek: Μελανίππη), or Melanippium or Melanippion (Μελανίππιον), was a small town on the coast of ancient Lycia, on the western slope of Mount Phoenicus, about 30 stadia from Cape Hieron, and 60 stadia south of Gagae, of which William Martin Leake wrote it was the port town.

The site is on the Karaöz Limanı.
