= Harold Henry =

Harold Henry may refer to:

- Harold A. Henry (1895–1966), community newspaper publisher and Los Angeles City Council member
- Harold William Henry (1909–1976), American-born Catholic missionary and bishop
