= Pygela (Lycia) =

Town of ancient Lycia

Pygela (Ancient Greek: Πύγελα) was a town of ancient Lycia, which per the Stadiasmus Patarensis was 60 stadia from Corydala.

Its site is unlocated, but is conjectured to be in the upper watershed of the Alakır River.
