= Musa Dağı (Antalya Province) =

Mountain in Turkey

- Location within Turkey

Highest point
- Elevation: 997 m (3,271 ft)
- Coordinates: 36°21′22″N 30°29′20″E

Naming
- English translation: Mountain of Moses

Geography
- Location: Adrasan, Antalya Province, Turkey

Musa Dağı (Mountain of Moses) is a mountain near Adrasan in Antalya Province, Turkey. The Lycian Way long-distance trail runs over the western slope of the mountain.

== Geography ==
The mountain lies close to the shore, northeast of Adrasan. Its tallest peak is Eren Tepe at 997 metres (3,271 ft).

== Sources ==
- Adak, Mustafa (2004). "Lokalisierung von Olympos und Korykos in Ostlykien". Gephyra (in German). 1 (1). Archived from the original on 2016-03-04.
