= Beydağları Coastal National Park =

National park in Antalya, Turkey

- Beydağları Sahil Milli Parkı
- IUCN category II (national park)
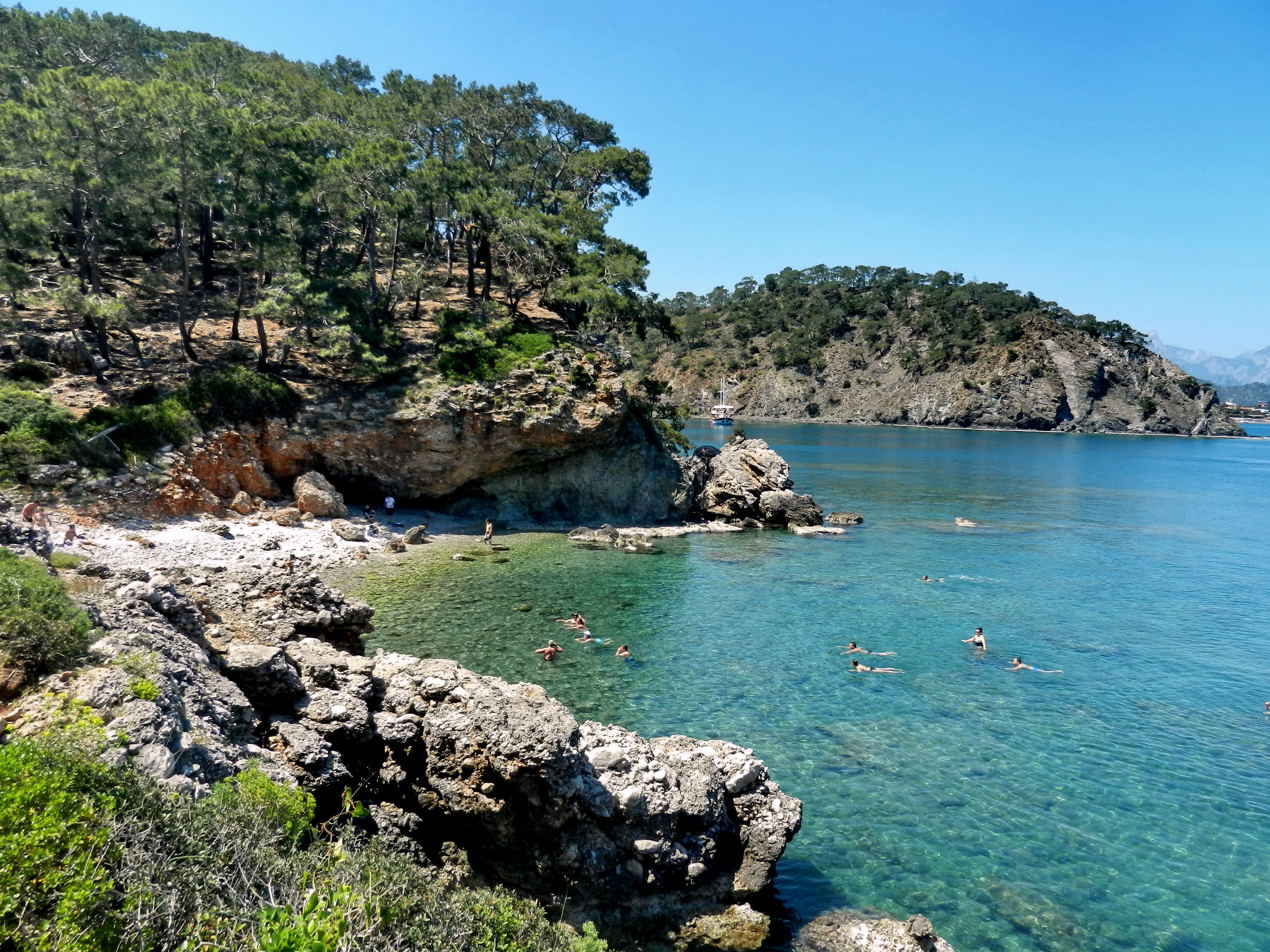
- Beydağları Coastal National Park

- Location within Turkey
- Location: Antalya Province, Turkey
- Nearest city: Antalya
- Coordinates: 36°35′40″N 30°30′38″E
- Area: 34,425 ha (132.92 sq mi)
- Established: March 16, 1972; 54 years ago
- Governing body: Directorate-General of Nature Protection and National Parks; Ministry of Environment and Forest
- Website: National Parks of Turkey

Beydağları Coastal National Park (Turkish: Beydağları Sahil Milli Parkı), a.k.a. Olympos Beydagları National Park (Turkish: Olimpos Beydağları Millî Parkı), is a national park in Antalya Province, southern Turkey.

The national park was established on March 16, 1972, by government decree. It stretches over an area of 34,425 ha (132.92 sq mi) beginning in Sarısu, located southwest of Antalya and reaching out to Cape Gelidonya parallel to the Mediterranean Sea across the Kemer-Kumluca shoreline.

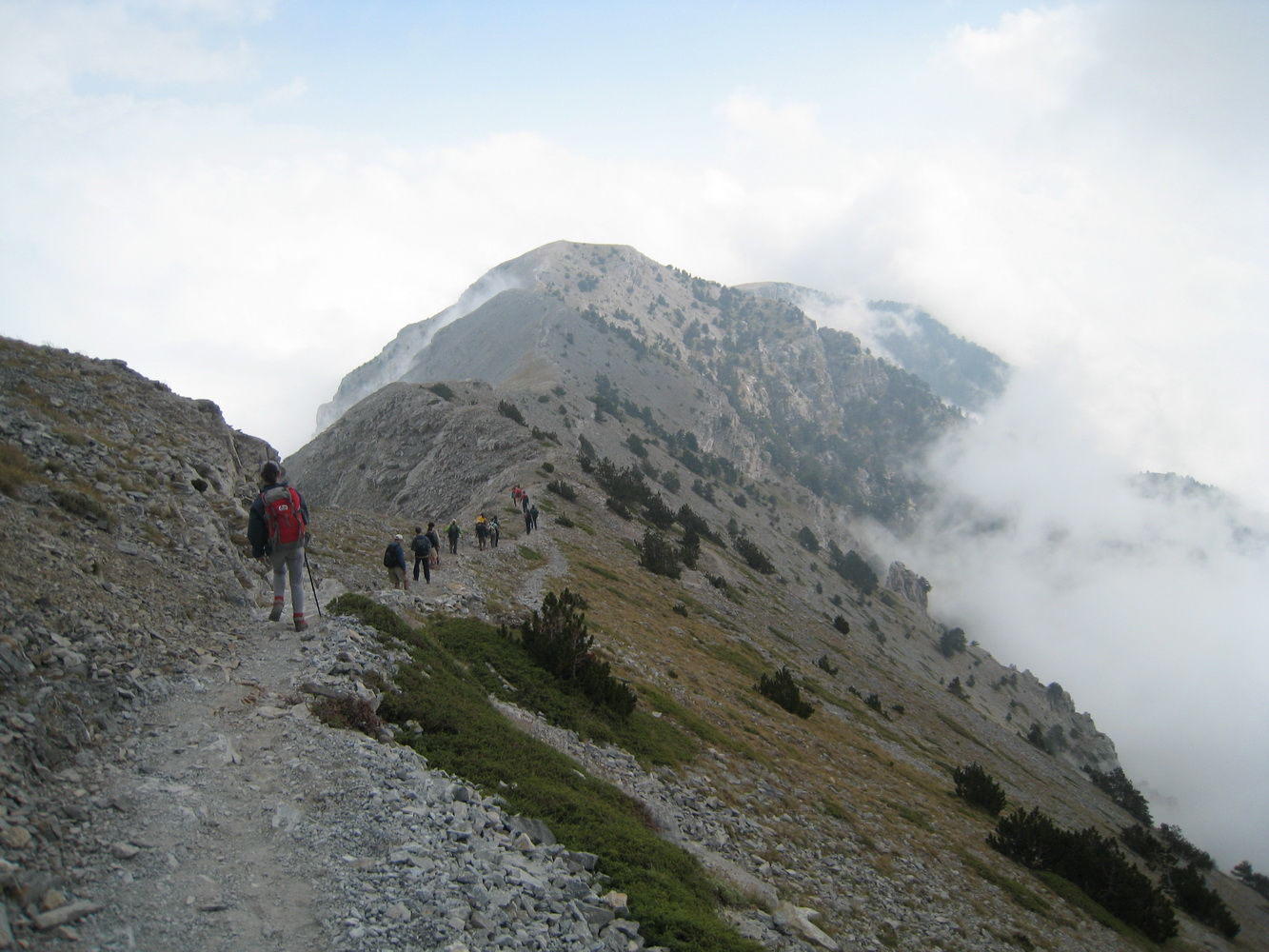
Trekking on Mount Olympos.

The ancient settlements Olympos, Phaselis and Idyros are situated within the national park, which lies between the shores of the ancient regions Pamphylia and Lycia. The tallest mountain in the park is Tahtalı Dağı. The Yanartaş burning gas field is found on the foothills of that mountain.

The national park offers place for activities such as beach and sea sports, picnic, camping, trekking, mountain climbing, paragliding etc. Visiting of the archeological sites within the national park is possible all around the year.

The park has a great biodiversity, it has over 865 plant species, 25 of which are endemic. Rare mammals include mountain goat, lynx, caracal and wolf.

== See also ==
- Olympos Aerial Tram
