= Adrasan Bay =

Bay in the Antalya Province, Turkey

Coordinates: 36.3086°N 30.4834°E

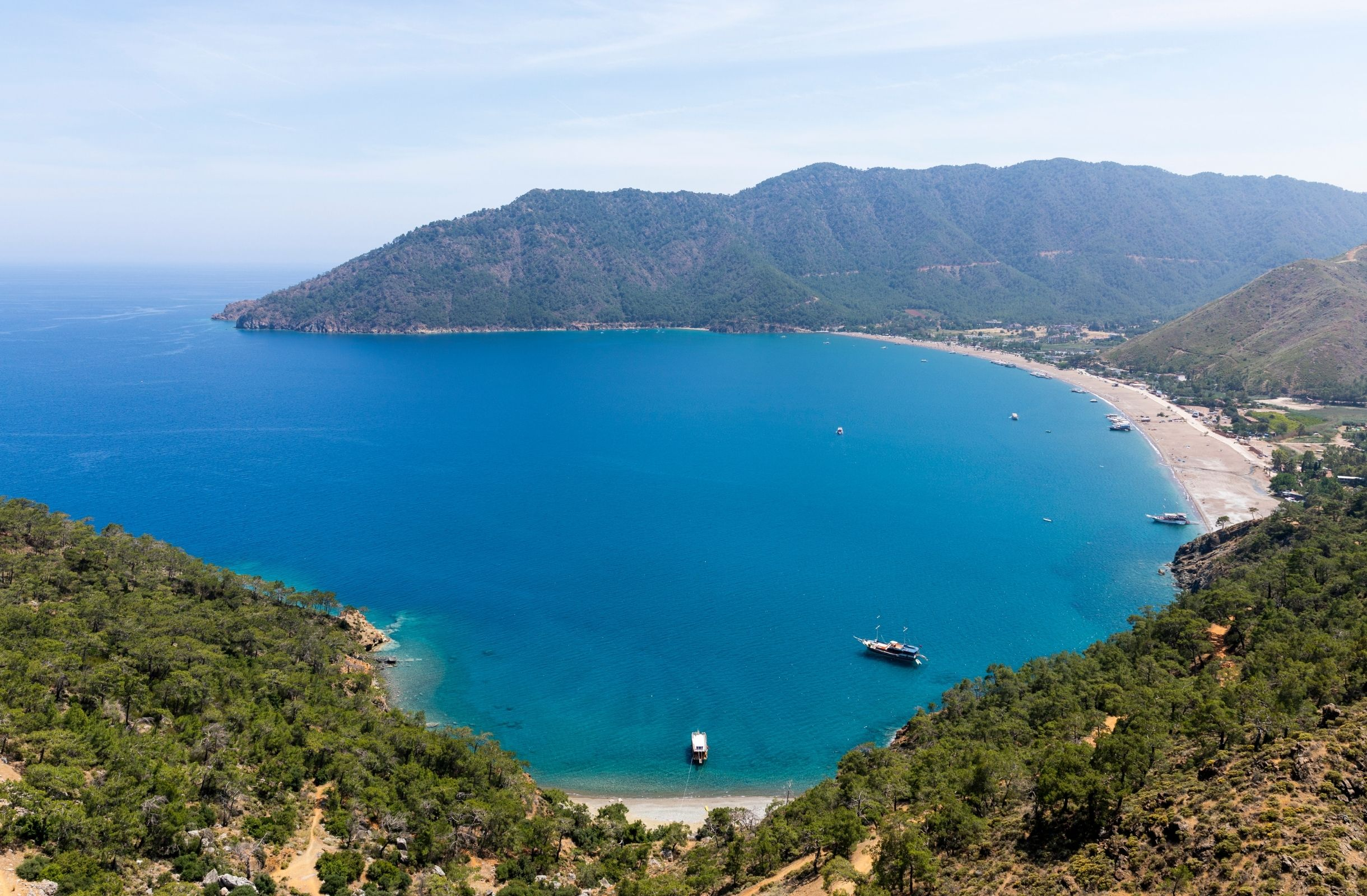

Adrasan Bay is located in the District of Kumluca, in the Antalya Province in Turkey. The name Adrasan, also known as Cavuskoy (Çavuşköy in Turkish - "Çavuş" means sergeant and "koy" means bay). The Bay of Adrasan extends along more than 2.5 km of Turkey's southern coast. The bay includes the town of Adrasan, in addition to smaller villages and hamlets. The town (3-5 kilometers form the bay) offers a couple of local bars, a post office, small shops and an open-air market. Adrasan Bay is a naturally protected area, surrounded by a national park with pine forests, Taurus Mountains, blue water lagoons and sandy beaches. It is used for water sports and various outdoor activities, such as hiking, trekking, snorkeling, diving and deep sea fishing.

In July 2015, a forest fire erupted near the Adrasan Beach. No loss of life was reported. However, around 125 hectares of forestland was burned, affecting the junction of the Lycian Way, the beach road and the slopes of the mountains. All the trekking routes have since been restored and are traversable for hikers. All of the site's tourist facilities have remained open.

Adrasan Bay is accessible by rental car, private transfer, taxi, public bus or shuttle bus – from Antalya airport or simply by using a mini bus ( dolmuş in Turkish) that travels to and from Kemer, Kumluca and other nearby towns.

The area has sandy beaches, blue lagoons and views from the Markiz Hill, located just at the entry of the bay.
