= Karacaören, Kumluca =

Karacaören
- Neighbourhood
- Location in Turkey
- Coordinates: 36.5359°N 30.1917°E
- Country: Turkey
- Province: Antalya
- District: Kumluca
- Population (2022): 675
- Time zone: UTC+3 (TRT)

Karacaören is a neighbourhood in the municipality and district of Kumluca, Antalya Province, Turkey. Its population is 675 (2022).
