= Çayiçi, Kumluca =

Çayiçi
- Neighbourhood
- Location in Turkey
- Coordinates: 36.4667°N 30.2333°E
- Country: Turkey
- Province: Antalya
- District: Kumluca
- Population (2022): 212
- Time zone: UTC+3 (TRT)

Çayiçi is a neighbourhood in the municipality and district of Kumluca, Antalya Province, Turkey. Its population is 212 (2022).
