= Sarıcasu =

- Neighbourhood
- Location in Turkey
- Coordinates: 36°24′N 30°17′E
- Country: Turkey
- Province: Antalya
- District: Kumluca
- Population (2022): 2,519
- Time zone: UTC+3 (TRT)

Sarıcasu is a neighbourhood in the municipality and district of Kumluca, Antalya Province, Turkey. Its population is 2,519 (2022).
