= Güzören, Kumluca =

Güzören
- Neighbourhood
- Location in Turkey
- Coordinates: 36.4628°N 30.3118°E
- Country: Turkey
- Province: Antalya
- District: Kumluca
- Population (2022): 525
- Time zone: UTC+3 (TRT)

Güzören is a neighbourhood in the municipality and district of Kumluca, Antalya Province, Turkey. Its population is 525 (2022).
