= Karacaağaç, Kumluca =

Karacaağaç
- Neighbourhood
- Location in Turkey
- Coordinates: 36.5147°N 30.3294°E
- Country: Turkey
- Province: Antalya
- District: Kumluca
- Population (2022): 246
- Time zone: UTC+3 (TRT)

Karacaağaç is a neighbourhood in the municipality and district of Kumluca, Antalya Province, Turkey. Its population is 246 (2022).
