= Toptaş, Kumluca =

Toptaş
- Neighbourhood
- Location in Turkey
- Coordinates: 36.4141°N 30.3239°E
- Country: Turkey
- Province: Antalya
- District: Kumluca
- Population (2022): 812
- Time zone: UTC+3 (TRT)

Toptaş is a neighbourhood in the municipality and district of Kumluca, Antalya Province, Turkey. Its population is 812 (2022). The village is inhabited by Tahtacı.
