= Beşikçi, Kumluca =

Beşikçi
- Neighbourhood
- Location in Turkey
- Coordinates: 36.3628°N 30.3450°E
- Country: Turkey
- Province: Antalya
- District: Kumluca
- Population (2022): 559
- Time zone: UTC+3 (TRT)

Beşikçi, also known as Baymak, is a neighbourhood in the municipality and district of Kumluca, Antalya Province, Turkey. Its population is 559 (2022). The village is inhabited by Tahtacı.
