= Corydala =

Ancient town in Lycia

Coordinates: 36°22′12″N 30°16′21″E

Corydala or Corydalla or Korydalla or Korydala (Ancient Greek: Κορύδαλλα) was a city of ancient Lycia. Anciently, it belonged to the Rhodians, according to Hecataeus, quoted by Stephanus. But it was not in Rhodes, nor was it one of the Rhodian possessions in the Peraea, Caria. The Tabula Peutingeriana marks Corydala (spelt Coridallo) on the road from Phaselis to Patara, and makes the distance between these two places 29 Roman miles (43 km; 27 mi) Pliny places Corydalla in the interior of Lycia, and Ptolemy mentions it with Sagalassus, Rhodia, Phellus, Myra, and other places, as about Mons Massicytus.

There are coins of Corydala of the imperial period, with the epigraph Κορυδαλλεων.

== Bishopric ==
At an early stage, Corydala became the seat of a Christian bishop, a suffragan of the metropolitan see of Myra, the capital of the Roman province of Lycia. In a letter to Amphilochius of Iconium, Saint Basil the Great mentions Bishop Alexander of Corydala as a champion of orthodoxy. Bishop Solon took part in the Council of Ephesus in 431. Palladius was a signatory of the letter that the bishops of Lycia sent in 458 to Byzantine Emperor Leo I the Thracian with regard to the murder of Proterius of Alexandria. Leo or Leontius was the name of a bishop of the see who was at the Second Council of Nicaea in 787. Le Quien, but not Janin, mention also a Eustrathius as a participant in the Photian Council of Constantinople (879).

No longer a residential bishopric, Corydala is today listed by the Catholic Church as a titular see. Harold William Henry was one of the titular bishops of the see.

== Remains ==
The present site is a village called Hacıveliler near Kumluca, on the east side of a small stream, about 16 miles (26 km), direct distance, south-west of Phaselis. There was discovered, in an old wall, a squared block, with its inscribed face turned towards the stones, on which, in beautifully preserved letters, was the name of the city—Corydalla. There are at Corydala the remains of a small theatre, of a Roman aqueduct, and a massive Hellenic wall. The inscription copied from Corydala is of the time of M. Aurelius Antoninus; and it shows that Corydala had the usual Greek constitution, a senate and a popular body. Pliny mentions Gagae, Corydala, and Rhodiopolis, in this order; and Rhodiopolis was found by Spratt and Forbes near Corydala.

== Bibliography ==
- İplikçioğlu, Bülent (2021). Die Inschriften von Korydalla [The Inscriptions of Corydala]. Tituli Asiae Minoris, vol. 2²,1. Vienna: ÖAW, ISBN 978-3-7001-8345-7.
