= Çaltı, Kumluca =

Çaltı
- Neighbourhood
- Location in Turkey
- Coordinates: 36.5468°N 30.2845°E
- Country: Turkey
- Province: Antalya
- District: Kumluca
- Population (2022): 196
- Time zone: UTC+3 (TRT)

Çaltı is a neighbourhood in the municipality and district of Kumluca, Antalya Province, Turkey. Its population is 196 (2022).
