= Gölcük, Kumluca =

Gölcük
- Neighbourhood
- Location in Turkey
- Coordinates: 36.6234°N 30.3510°E
- Country: Turkey
- Province: Antalya
- District: Kumluca
- Population (2022): 172
- Time zone: UTC+3 (TRT)

Gölcük is a neighbourhood in the municipality and district of Kumluca, Antalya Province, Turkey. Its population is 172 (2022).
