= Çamyuva =

- Neighbourhood
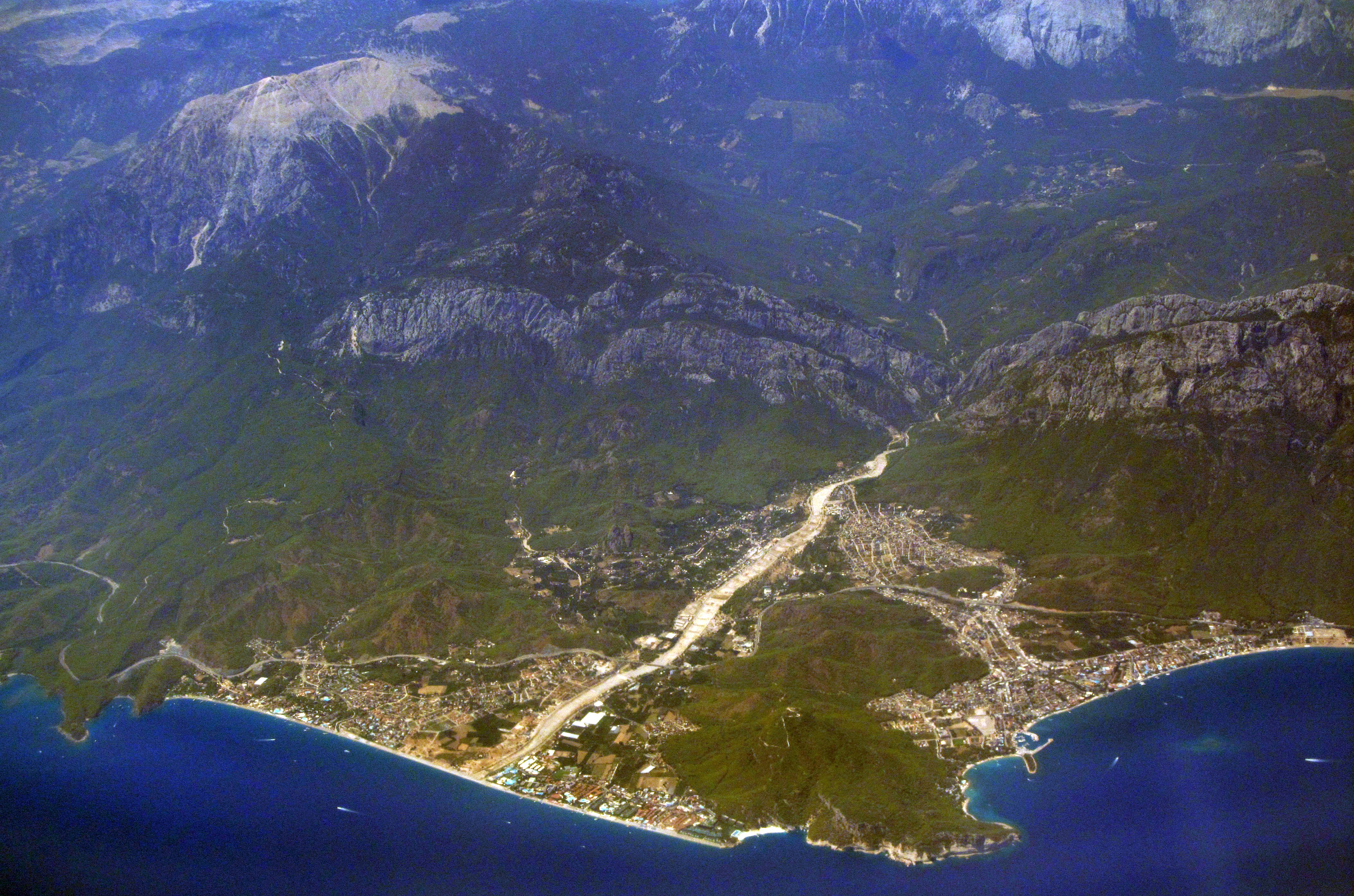
- Kemer and Çamyuva at the foot of Tahtalı Dağı

- Location within Turkey
- Coordinates: 36°33′40″N 30°33′35″E
- Country: Turkey
- Province: Antalya
- District: Kemer
- Population (2022): 6,067
- Time zone: UTC+3 (TRT)
- Area code: 0242

Çamyuva is a neighbourhood of the municipality and district of Kemer, Antalya Province, Turkey. Its population is 6,067 (2022). Before the 2013 reorganisation, it was a town (belde).

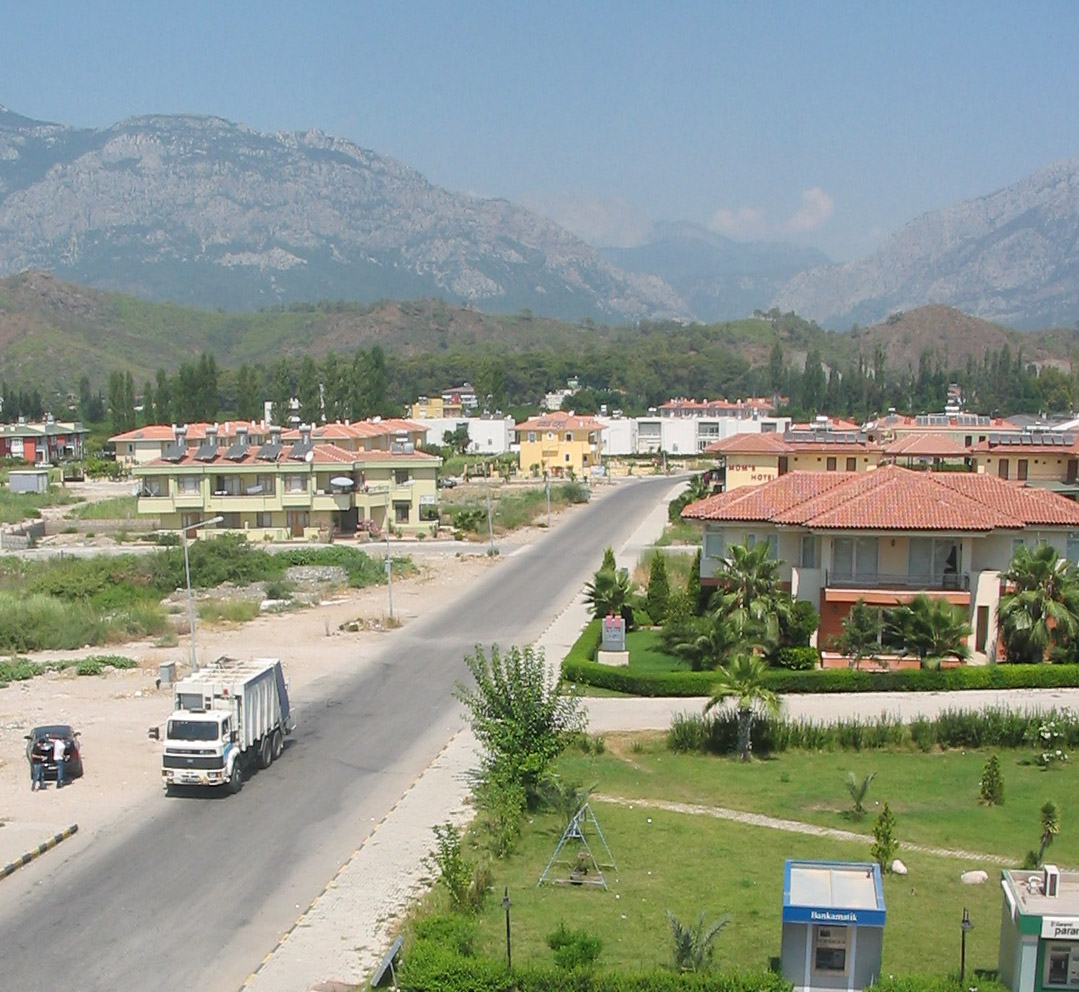
Overview of Çamyuva

It is situated to the south of the central town of Kemer. Although during the past few years much construction has occurred, it is still famous for numerous olive and orange groves. The base station of the Olympos Aerial Tram is located nearby Çamyuva.
