= Erentepe, Kumluca =

Erentepe
- Neighbourhood
- Location in Turkey
- Coordinates: 36.4164°N 30.3616°E
- Country: Turkey
- Province: Antalya
- District: Kumluca
- Population (2022): 635
- Time zone: UTC+3 (TRT)

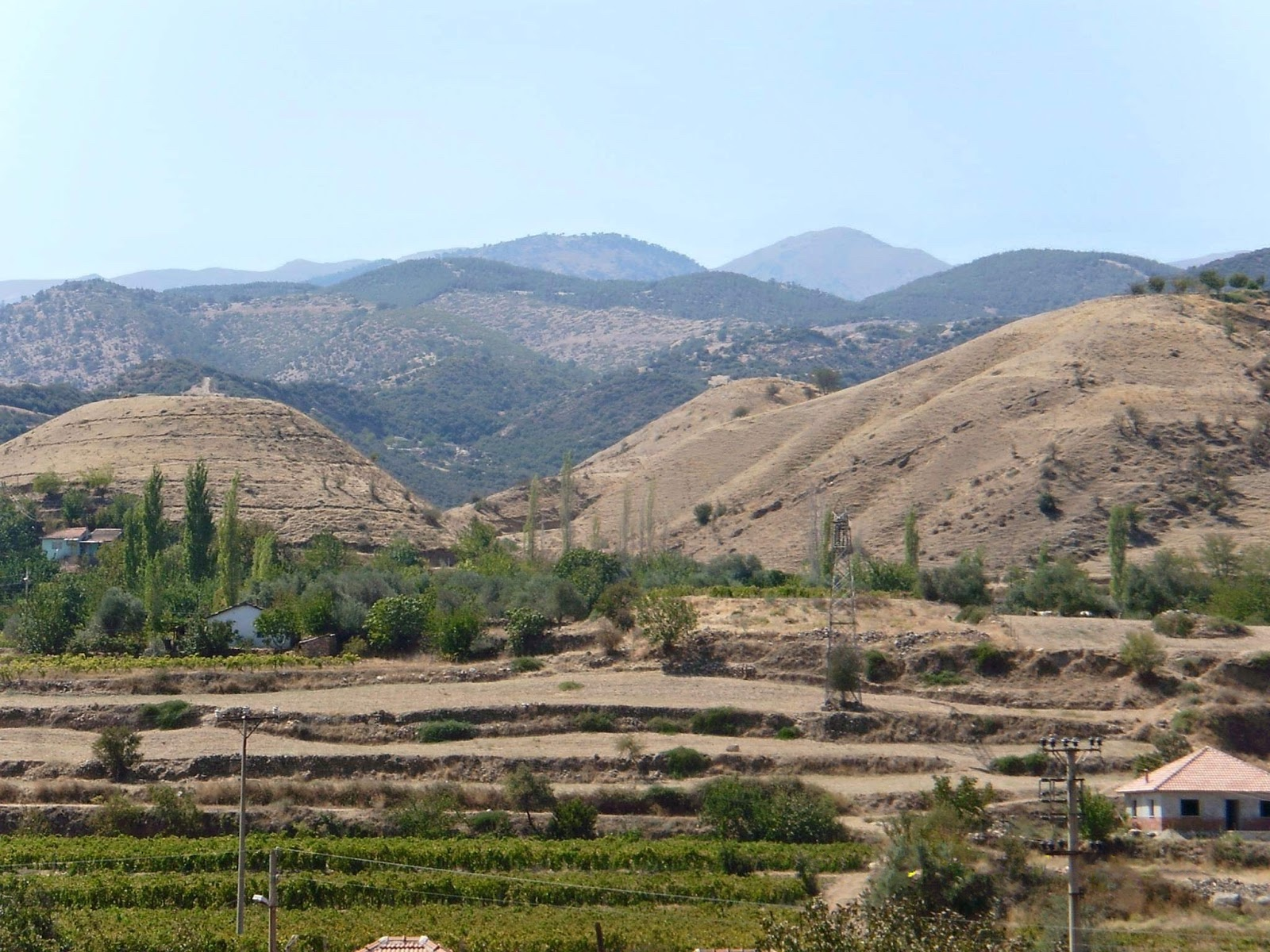
Erektepe. Kumluca

Erentepe is a neighbourhood in the municipality and district of Kumluca, Antalya Province, Turkey. Its population is 635 (2022).
