= Kuzca, Kumluca =

Kuzca
- Neighbourhood
- Location in Turkey
- Coordinates: 36.6690°N 30.3320°E
- Country: Turkey
- Province: Antalya
- District: Kumluca
- Population (2022): 281
- Time zone: UTC+3 (TRT)

Kuzca is a neighbourhood in the municipality and district of Kumluca, Antalya Province, Turkey. Its population is 281 (2022).
