= Yazır, Kumluca =

Yazır
- Neighbourhood
- Location in Turkey
- Coordinates: 36°23′10″N 30°25′05″E
- Country: Turkey
- Province: Antalya
- District: Kumluca
- Population (2022): 1,120
- Time zone: UTC+3 (TRT)

Yazır is a neighbourhood in the municipality and district of Kumluca, Antalya Province, Turkey. Its population is 1,120 (2022).
