= Olympos Aerial Tram =

Aerial tramway in Antalya, Turkey

- Olympos Teleferik
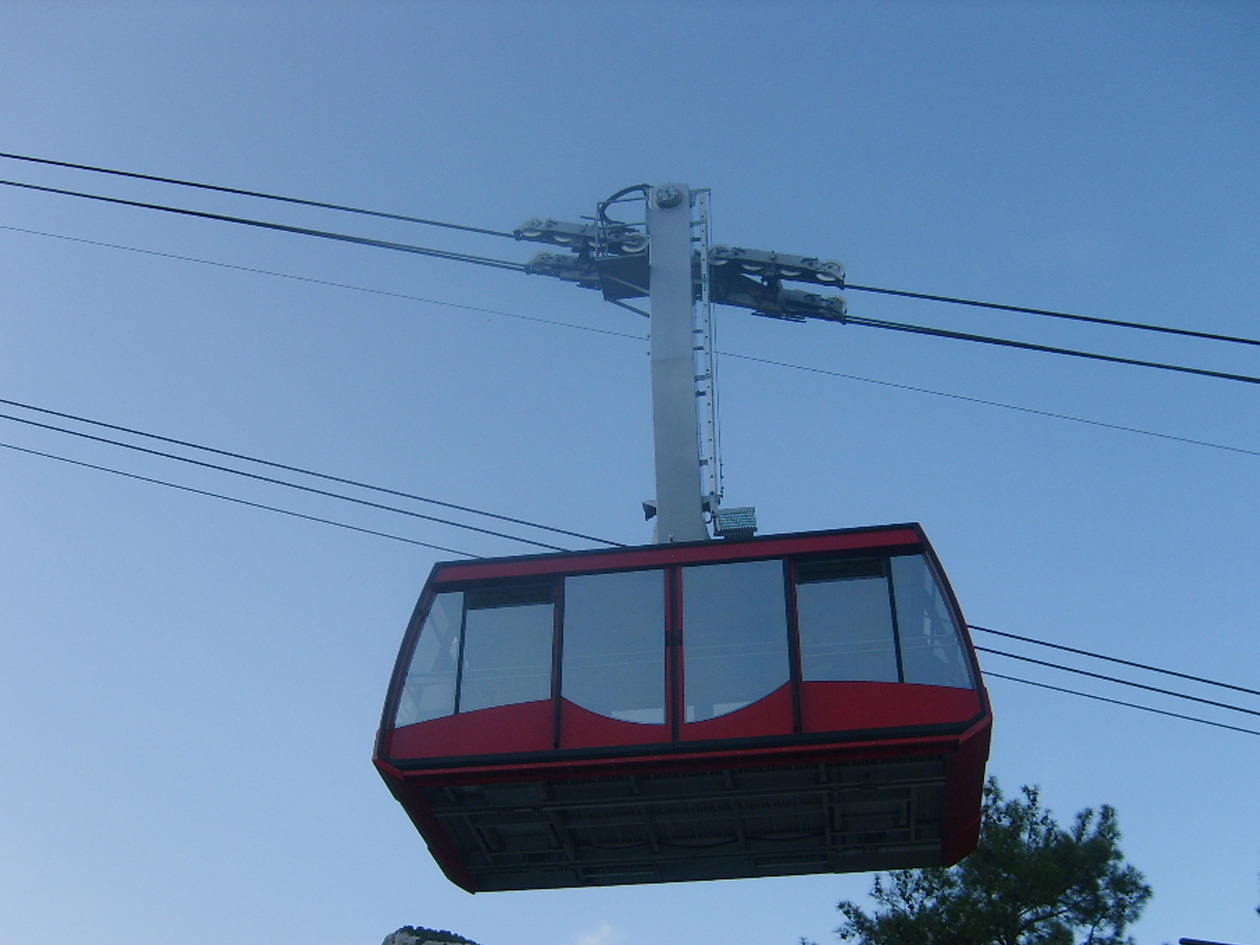
- A cable car of Olympos Aerial Tram

- Location within Turkey

Overview
- Status: Operational
- Character: Recreational
- Location: Kemer, Antalya Province
- Country: Turkey
- Coordinates: 36°32′33″N 30°29′11″E
- Termini: Çamyuva-Tekirova; Mt. Olympos (Tahtalı Dağı)
- Elevation: lowest: 726 m (2,382 ft) highest: 2,365 m (7,759 ft)
- No. of stations: 2
- Services: Mt. Olympos (Tahtalı Dağı)
- Open: June 17, 2007; 19 years ago
- Website: www.olymposteleferik.com/en/

Operation
- Operator: Olympos Teleferik Co.
- No. of carriers: 2
- Carrier capacity: 80

Technical features
- Aerial lift type: Aerial tramway
- Line length: 4.359 km (2.709 mi)
- No. of support towers: 4

The Olympos Aerial Tram (Turkish: Olympos Teleferik), aka Olympos Cable Car, is an aerial lift of tramway type located in Antalya Province, southern Turkey, serving the peak of Mount Olympos (Turkish: Tahtalı Dağı) at an altitude of 2,365 m (7,759 ft) from Kemer. It went into service on June 17, 2007.

The aerial lift line was constructed by the Austrian Doppelmayr Garaventa Group. With its length of 4,359 m (14,301 ft), it is one of the longest passenger-carrying aerial tramway lines in the world. There are four supporting towers located between the two terminals. The aerial tram consists of two passenger cabins, each capable of carrying 80 passengers. Two fixed track cables are for support while one loop of cable, solidly connected to the cabins, is for haulage. An electric motor drives the haulage rope, which provides propulsion. When the cabins arrive at the end stations, the cable loop stops and reverses direction so that the cars shuttle back and forth between the terminals.

The base station is located between the towns of Çamyuva and Tekirova in Kemer district at 726 m (2,382 ft) altitude and about 57 km (35 mi) south of Antalya. The mountain station offers a panoramic view of the Mediterranean coast from Finike in the southwest and Side in the northeast, and features a restaurant and gift shops.

In case of a power supply cut, a hydrostatic emergency power system ensures safe continuation of operations. Passengers can be evacuated by ropes at locations where the cabin is not very high from the ground. Evacuation of passengers is also possible by small emergency cabins capable of carrying 25 people, or by helicopter in good weather.

Mt. Olympos is situated within the Beydağları Coastal National Park. The site offers trekking, mountain climbing and paragliding activities in the summer and skiing in the winter time.

Operation hours are everyday from 10 to 17 hours.

- Base station: 726 m (2,382 ft) 36°32′33″N 30°29′11″E
- Mountain station: 2,365 m (7,759 ft) 36°32′11″N 30°26′30″E

== See also ==
- Beydağları Coastal National Park
