= Tekirova =

- Neighbourhood
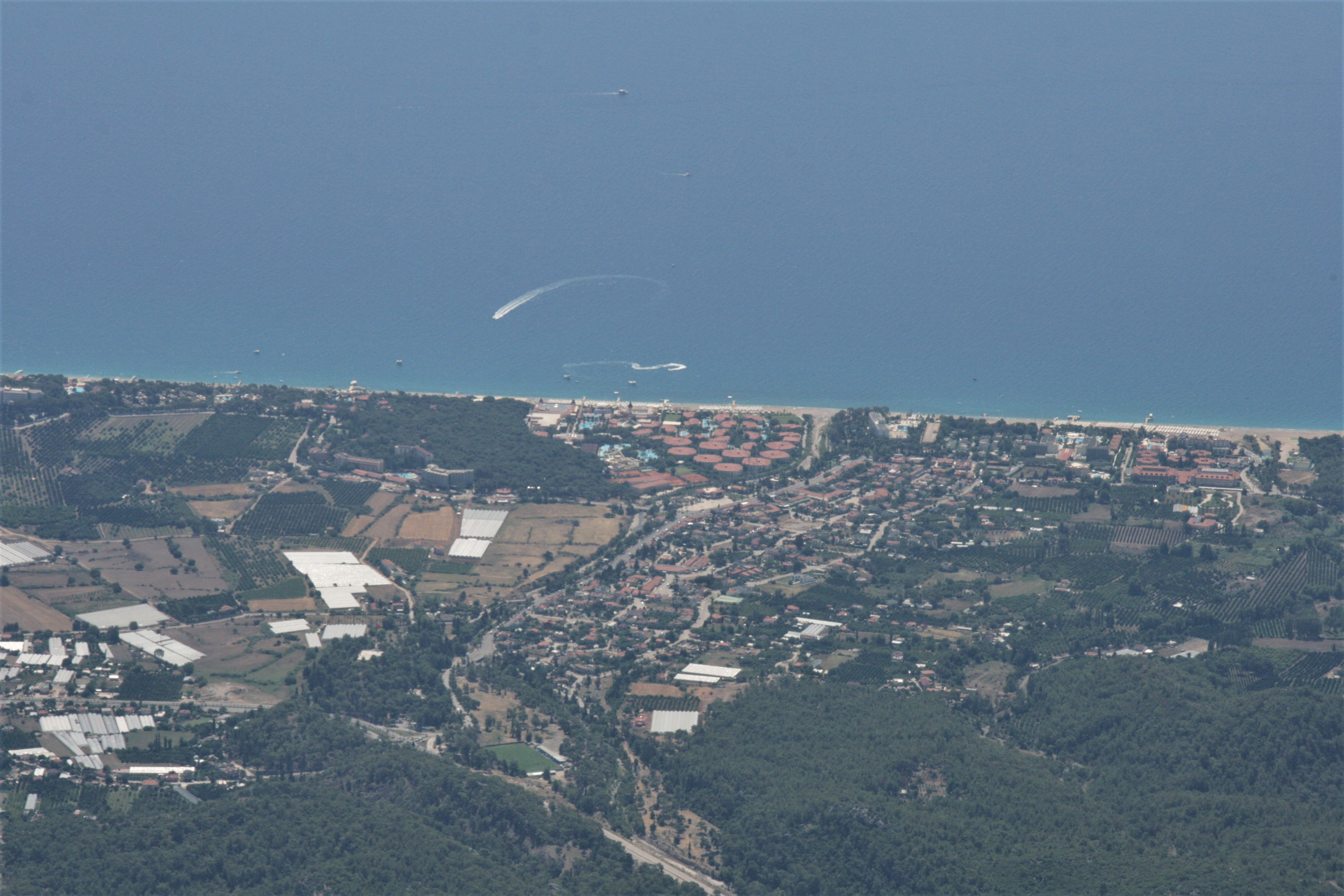
- Tekirova seen from Tahtalı Dağı

- Location within Turkey
- Coordinates: 36°30′11″N 30°31′23″E
- Country: Turkey
- Province: Antalya
- District: Kemer
- Population (2022): 3,044
- Time zone: UTC+3 (TRT)

Tekirova is a neighbourhood of the municipality and district of the touristic town of Kemer, Antalya Province, Turkey. Its population is 3,044 (2022). Before the 2013 reorganisation, it was a town (belde).

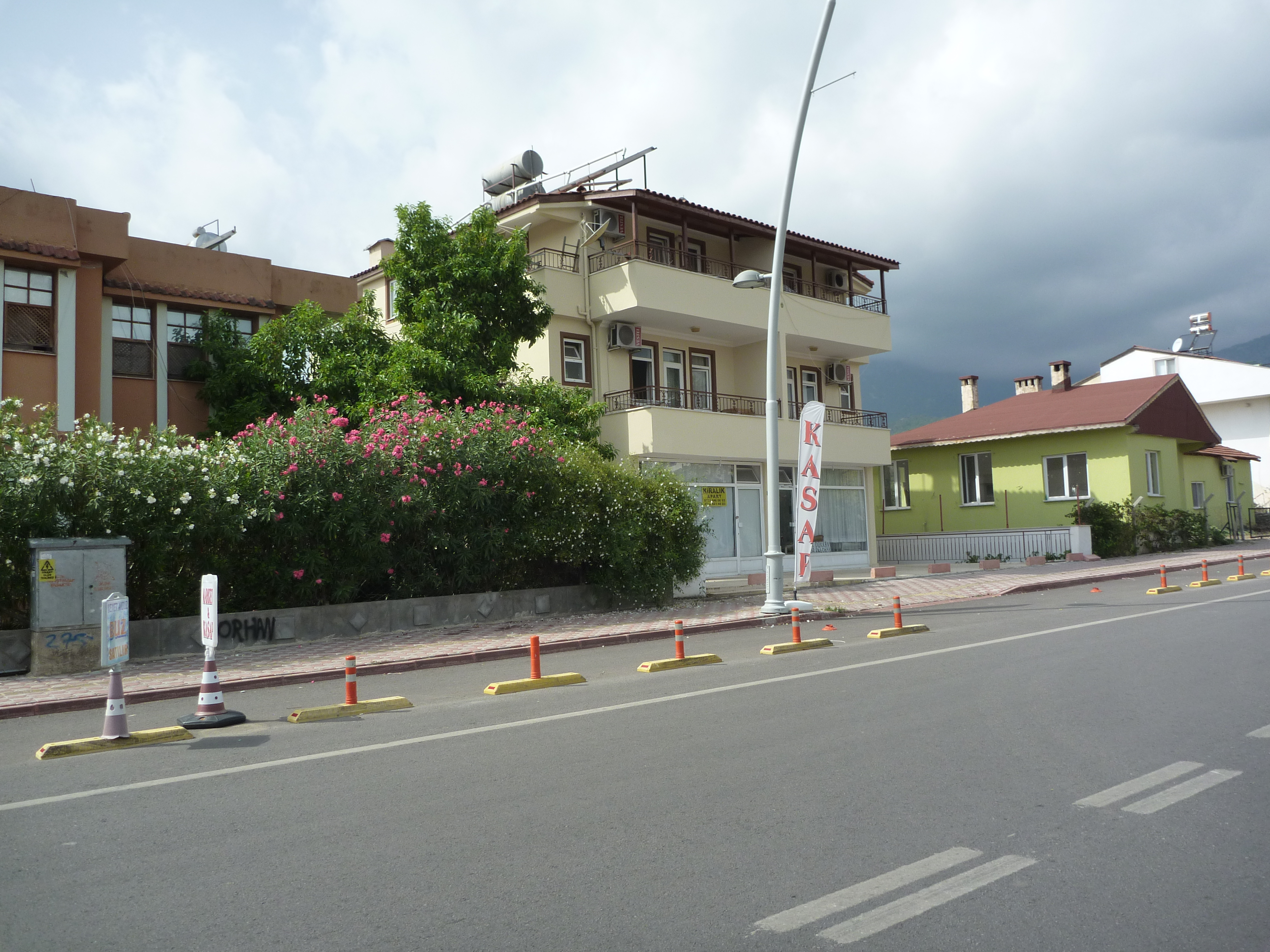
A street in Tekirova

Large hotels for tourists are established in the town. The base station of the Olympos Aerial Tram is located nearby Tekirova.
