= İncircik, Kumluca =

İncircik
- Neighbourhood
- Country: Turkey
- Province: Antalya
- District: Kumluca
- Population (2022): 311
- Time zone: UTC+3 (TRT)

İncircik is a neighbourhood in the municipality and district of Kumluca, Antalya Province, Turkey. Its population is 311 (2022).
