= Büyükalan, Kumluca =

Büyükalan
- Neighbourhood
- Location in Turkey
- Coordinates: 36°43′48″N 30°19′12″E
- Country: Turkey
- Province: Antalya
- District: Kumluca
- Population (2022): 181
- Time zone: UTC+3 (TRT)

Büyükalan is a neighbourhood in the municipality and district of Kumluca, Antalya Province, Turkey. Its population is 181 (2022).
