= Mount Omurga =

Mountain in Turkey

- Location within Turkey

Highest point
- Coordinates: 36°23′48″N 30°28′23″E

Geography
- Location: Çıralı, Antalya Province, Turkey

Mount Omurga in Olympos, Turkey, is located alongside the Olympos ruins. It has three peaks in a distinctive arrangement (Omurga means 'spine' in Turkish). There are several ruins adjacent to Omurga, including a Byzantine defense fortification on the north face of Çamoda.

== Çamoda Peak ==
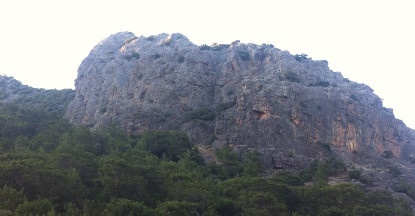
Çamoda as seen from the Olympos valley, past the ruins

The Çamoda Peak, also known as Mount Chamoda, is the most significant of Mount Omurga's three peaks. The peak bounds the Olympos ruins on their north side. Çamoda's highest point is over 500 meters above sea level.

Çamoda is known for its appearance over Olympos valley, from which it resembles a large rectangular protuberance, and its surrounding orange orchards.

Çamoda has been a popular climbing day trip for tourists in the area and offers great views of Olympos beach, the adjacent ruins, and the valley pensions.
