= Adrasan, Kumluca =

Adrasan
- Neighbourhood
- Location in Turkey
- Coordinates: 36°20′N 30°26′E
- Country: Turkey
- Province: Antalya
- District: Kumluca
- Population (2022): 2,602
- Time zone: UTC+3 (TRT)

Adrasan, also known as Çavuşköy, is a neighbourhood in the municipality and district of Kumluca, Antalya Province, Turkey. Its population is 2,602 (2022). Before the 2013 reorganisation, it was a town (belde). A collection of smaller villages and hamlets, Adrasan extends along a 2.5 Kilometer stretch of coast - most of which is sand and shingle beach. The settlements of this coastal section of Adrasan are almost exclusively dedicated to the tourism industry, with a number of pension style hotels, apartments and restaurants. Moving further inland, agricultural activity is visible in the lowland areas, as well as residential rural settlement.

The surrounding Adrasan Bay is known for its natural environment, and is also a common fishing spot among locals. Boat trips are available daily during the summer months, taking tourists along Antalya's mountainous coastal region. Visibility in these waters can reach up to 25 meters on a clear day, making it popular with swimmers and snorkelers. The area is positioned along the Lycian Way, and is less than half a day's walk from the eternal flames at Mount Chimaera and the lighthouse at Cape Gelidonya (both part of the Olympus national park). Consequently, a number of hikers stop there during the summer months.
