= Altınyaka, Kumluca =

Altınyaka
- Neighbourhood
- Location in Turkey
- Coordinates: 36.5586°N 30.3483°E
- Country: Turkey
- Province: Antalya
- District: Kumluca
- Population (2022): 225
- Time zone: UTC+3 (TRT)

Altınyaka is a neighbourhood in the municipality and district of Kumluca, Antalya Province, Turkey. Its population is 225 (2022).
