= Ortaköy, Kumluca =

Ortaköy
- Neighbourhood
- Location in Turkey
- Coordinates: 36°25′43″N 30°17′05″E
- Country: Turkey
- Province: Antalya
- District: Kumluca
- Population (2022): 544
- Time zone: UTC+3 (TRT)

Ortaköy is a neighbourhood in the municipality and district of Kumluca, Antalya Province, Turkey. Its population is 544 (2022).
