= Mavikent =

- Neighbourhood
- Location in Turkey
- Coordinates: 36°19′N 30°21′E
- Country: Turkey
- Province: Antalya
- District: Kumluca
- Population (2022): 7,036
- Time zone: UTC+3 (TRT)

Mavikent is a neighbourhood in the municipality and district of Kumluca, Antalya Province, Turkey. Its population is 7,036 (2022). Before the 2013 reorganisation, it was a town (belde). Many turtles in the area that lay their eggs on the beaches there.
