= Belen, Kumluca =

Belen
- Neighbourhood
- Location in Turkey
- Coordinates: 36.3656°N 30.3874°E
- Country: Turkey
- Province: Antalya
- District: Kumluca
- Population (2022): 363
- Time zone: UTC+3 (TRT)

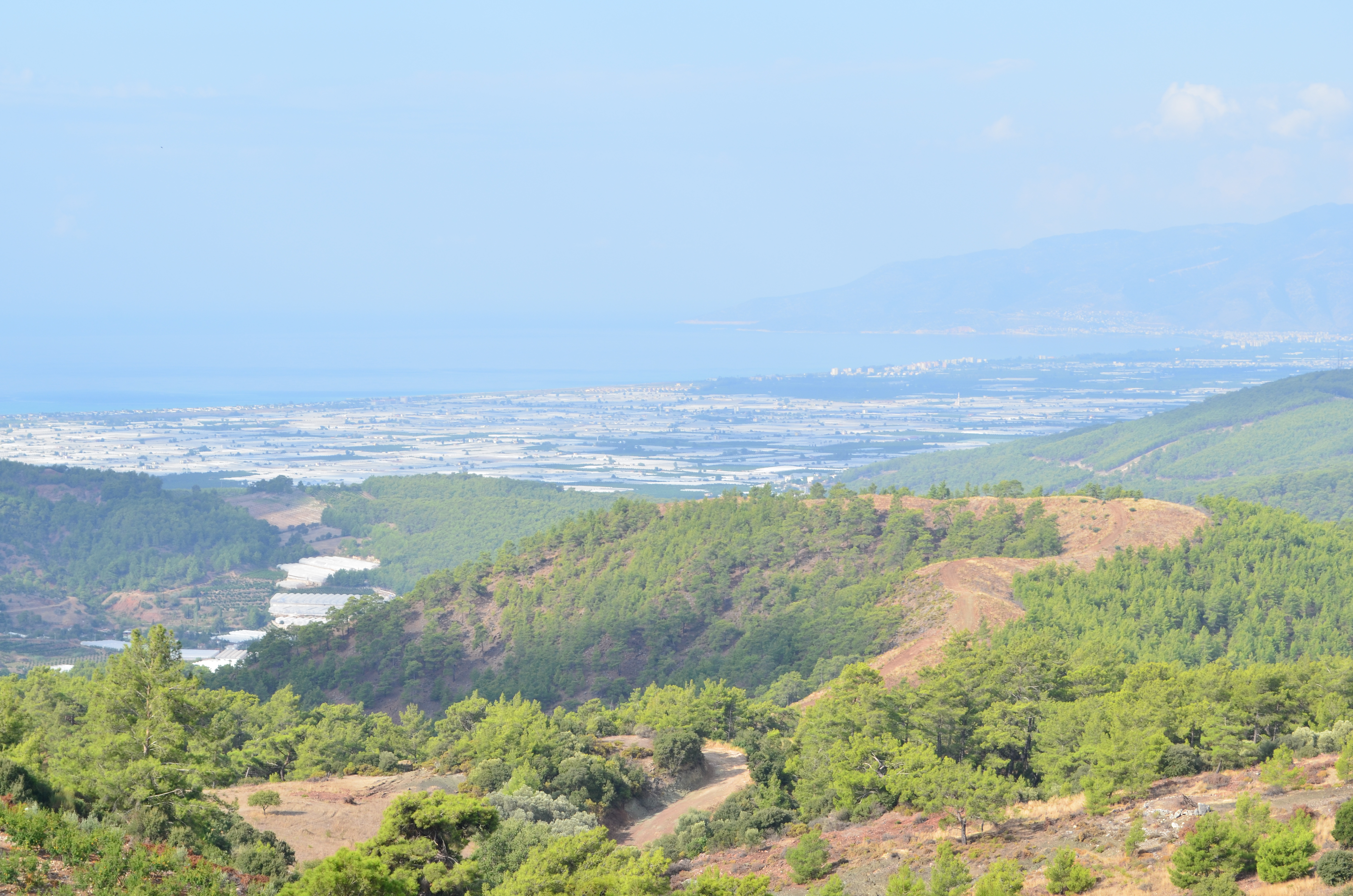

Belen is a neighbourhood in the municipality and district of Kumluca, Antalya Province, Turkey. Its population is 363 (2022).
