= Salur, Kumluca =

Salur
- Neighbourhood
- Location in Turkey
- Coordinates: 36.3726°N 30.2288°E
- Country: Turkey
- Province: Antalya
- District: Kumluca
- Population (2022): 1,971
- Time zone: UTC+3 (TRT)

Salur is a neighbourhood in the municipality and district of Kumluca, Antalya Province, Turkey. Its population is 1,971 (2022).
