= Yeşilköy, Kumluca =

Yeşilköy
- Neighbourhood
- Location in Turkey
- Coordinates: 36.3249°N 30.3938°E
- Country: Turkey
- Province: Antalya
- District: Kumluca
- Population (2022): 166
- Time zone: UTC+3 (TRT)

Yeşilköy is a neighbourhood in the municipality and district of Kumluca, Antalya Province, Turkey. Its population is 166 (2022).
