= Dereköy, Kumluca =

Dereköy
- Neighbourhood
- Country: Turkey
- Province: Antalya
- District: Kumluca
- Population (2022): 162
- Time zone: UTC+3 (TRT)

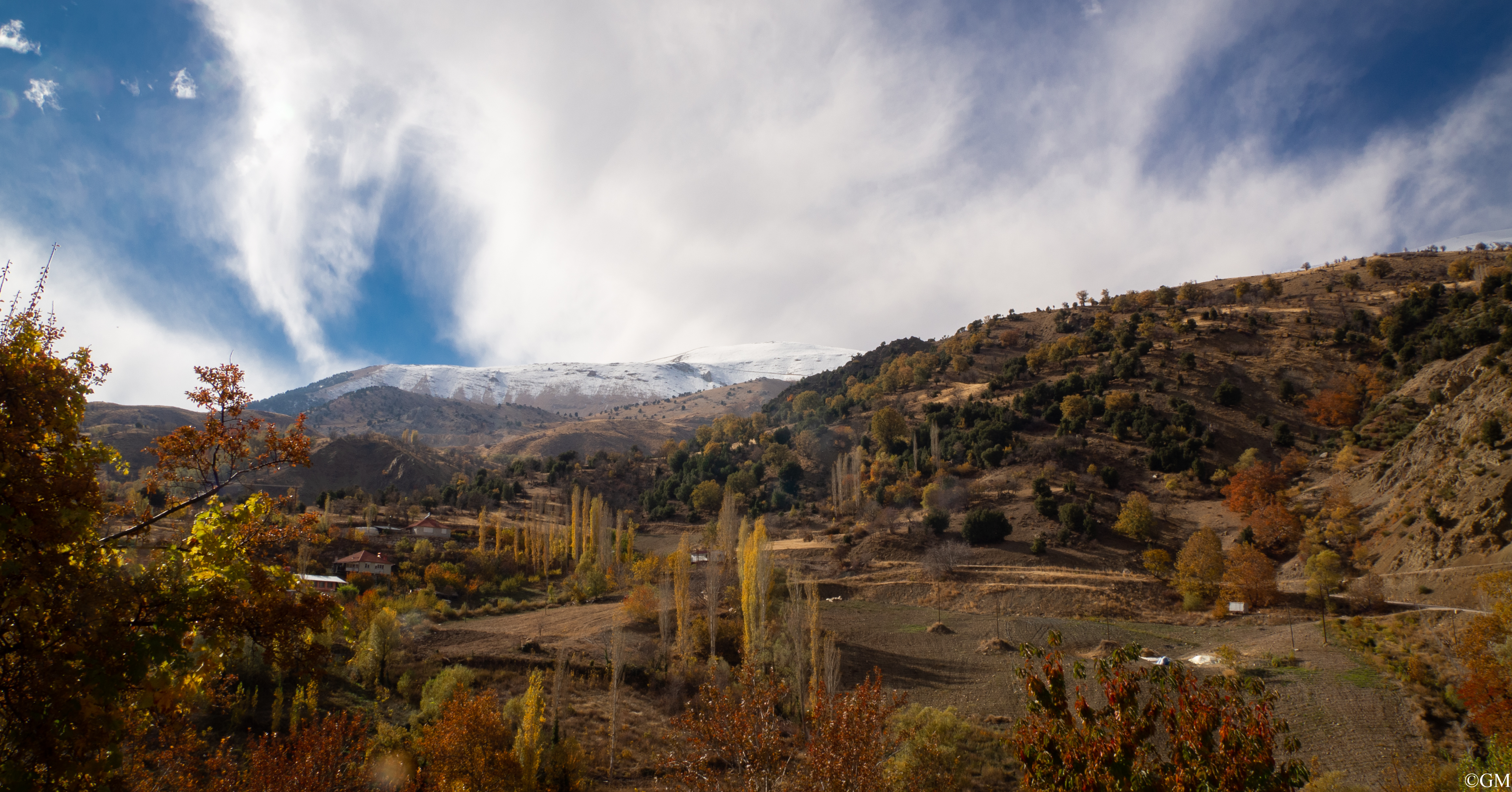

Dereköy is a neighbourhood in the municipality and district of Kumluca, Antalya Province, Turkey. Its population is 162 (2022).
