= Hızırkahya =

- Neighbourhood
- Location in Turkey
- Coordinates: 36°21′N 30°15′E
- Country: Turkey
- Province: Antalya
- District: Kumluca
- Population (2022): 716
- Time zone: UTC+3 (TRT)

Hızırkahya, also known as Çalka, is a neighbourhood in the municipality and district of Kumluca, Antalya Province, Turkey. Its population is 716 (2022). The village is inhabited by Tahtacı.
