= Harold William Henry =

American Catholic missionary and bishop

The Most Reverend Harold W. Henry, S.S.C.
- Archbishop of Gwangju
- Church: Roman Catholic
- Appointed: March 10, 1962
- Term ended: June 28, 1971
- Successor: Peter Han Kong-ryel (한공렬 베드로)
- Other posts: Titular Bishop of Corydala (1957–1962); Titular Bishop of Thubunae in Numidia and Apostolic Administrator of Cheju (1971–1976)
- Previous posts: Prefect of Kwangju (1954–1957); Vicar Apostolic of Kwangju (1957–1962)

Orders
- Ordination: December 21, 1932
- Consecration: May 11, 1957 by Richard Cushing

Personal details
- Born: July 11, 1909 Northfield, Minnesota, US
- Died: March 1, 1976 (aged 66) Jeju City, Jeju-do, Republic of Korea
- Coat of arms

Harold William Henry, S.S.C. (July 11, 1909 – March 1, 1976), also known as Harold Hyeon (Korean: 현 하롤드) in Korean, was an American-born Catholic missionary and bishop. As a member of the Missionary Society of St. Columban he was assigned to missions in South Korea. He served as the Prefect of Kwangju from 1954 to 1957, Vicar Apostolic of Kwangju from 1957 to 1962, the first Archbishop of Gwangju from 1962 to 1971, and as the Apostolic Administrator of Cheju from 1971 to 1976.

== Biography ==
Born in Northfield, Minnesota, Harold Henry was ordained a priest on December 21, 1932, for the Missionary Society of St. Columban.

Pope Pius XII named him as the Apostolic Prefect of Kwangju in 1954. On January 26, 1957, he was named the titular bishop of Corydala and Vicar Apostolic of Kwangju. Henry was consecrated a bishop on May 11, 1957, by Archbishop Richard Cushing of Boston. The principal co-consecrators were Bishop John Wright of Worcester and Boston Auxiliary Bishop Jeremiah Minihan. Pope John XXIII named him as the Archbishop of Gwangju on March 10, 1962. He attended three of the four sessions of the Second Vatican Council (1962–1965). Pope Paul VI named Henry the Apostolic Administrator of the Diocese of Cheju on June 28, 1971. On the same date he was transferred to the titular see of Thubunae in Numidia.

Henry died from a heart attack during Mass in Jeju on March 1, 1976, at the age of 66.
