= Yenikışla, Kumluca =

Yenikışla
- Neighbourhood
- Location in Turkey
- Coordinates: 36.5075°N 30.2194°E
- Country: Turkey
- Province: Antalya
- District: Kumluca
- Population (2022): 142
- Time zone: UTC+3 (TRT)

Yenikışla is a neighbourhood in the municipality and district of Kumluca, Antalya Province, Turkey. Its population is 142 (2022).
