= Hacıveliler =

- Neighbourhood
- Location in Turkey
- Coordinates: 36.3675°N 30.2733°E
- Country: Turkey
- Province: Antalya
- District: Kumluca
- Population (2022): 2,376
- Time zone: UTC+3 (TRT)

Hacıveliler is a neighbourhood in the municipality and district of Kumluca, Antalya Province, Turkey. Its population is 2,376 (2022).

From 550 BC to 640 AD the area was the centre of a Greek settlement called Korydalla. According to The Princeton Encyclopedia of Classical Sites, "The city is recorded by Hekataios and by several later writers. Pliny (HN 5.100) calls it a city of the Rhodians; and probably, like its neighbors Rhodiapolis, Gagai, and Phaselis, it was founded from Rhodes. On the other hand, a bilingual inscription in Lycian and Greek, recently found at Kumluca, shows it to have been a genuine Lycian city." The city is said to have stood on two hills some 90 m high. Unfortunately according to the Princeton Encyclopaedia, "The ruins previously visible have in recent years been utterly destroyed and the stones carried away."
