= Kumluca =

- District and municipality
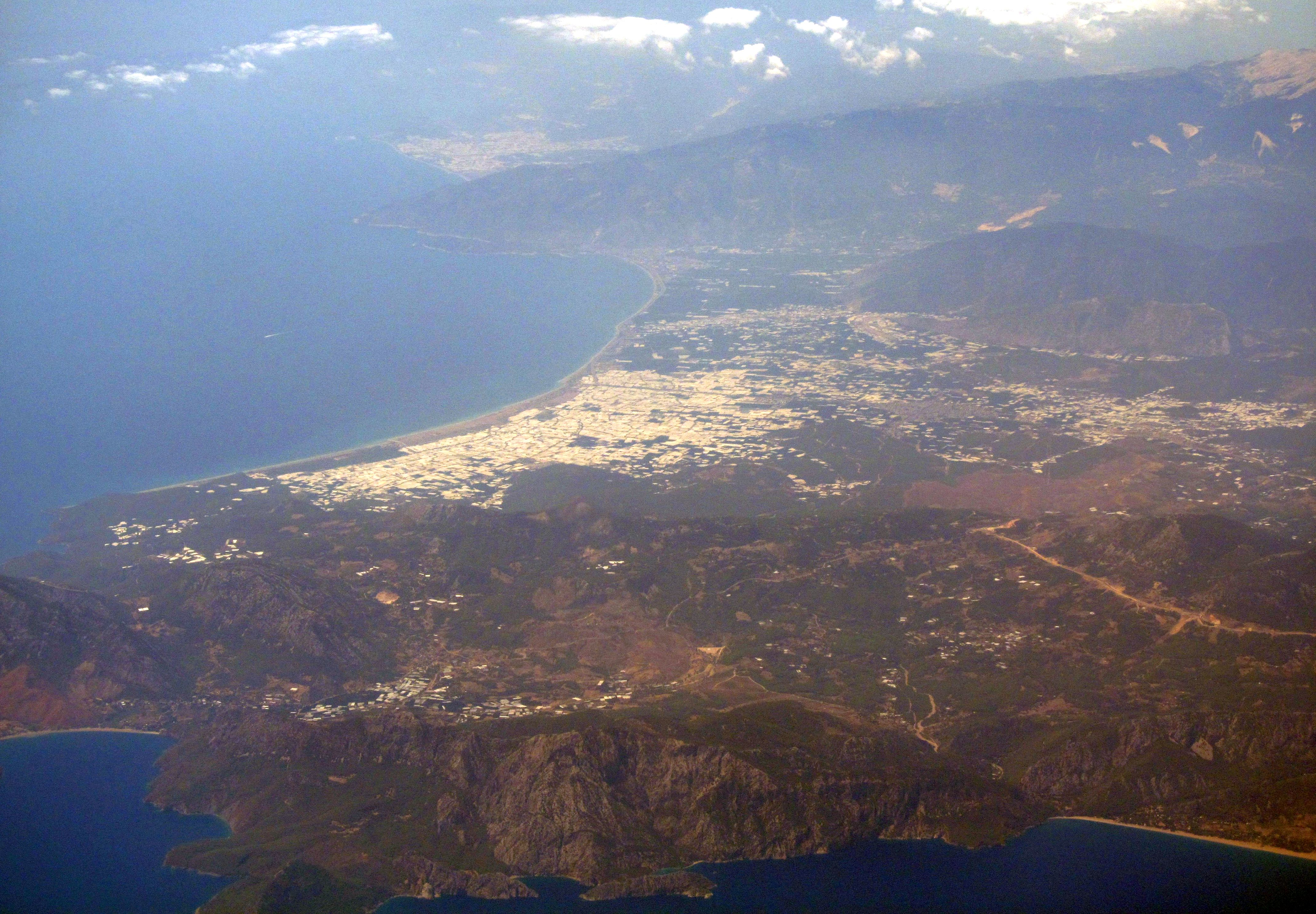
- Aerial view

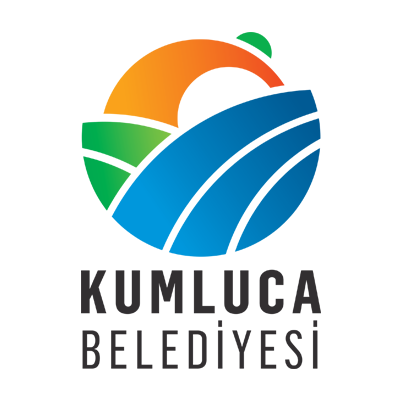
- Logo

- Map showing Kumluca District in Antalya Province

- Location within Turkey
- Coordinates: 36°22′N 30°17′E
- Country: Turkey
- Province: Antalya

Government
  - Mayor: Mesut Avcıoğlu (DP)
- Area: 1,225 km^{2} (473 sq mi)
- Elevation: 15 m (49 ft)
- Population (2022): 73,496
  - Density: 60.00/km^{2} (155.4/sq mi)
- Time zone: UTC+3 (TRT)
- Postal code: 07350
- Area code: 0242
- Website: www.kumluca-bld.gov.tr

Kumluca is a municipality and district of Antalya Province, Turkey. Its area is 1,225 km^{2}, and its population is 73,496 (2022). It lies on the Mediterranean coast, and is part of the Turkish Riviera. Kumluca is located 90 km (56 mi) west of the city of Antalya, on the Teke Peninsula, (between the bays of Antalya and Fethiye). Its neighbour towns are Korkuteli, Elmalı, Finike, Kemer and Antalya

The town of Kumluca, formerly the village of Sarıkavak, is named for its sandy soil (kum meaning sand in Turkish), good for growing watermelons.

== Geography ==
The centre of the district is a plain pointing north from the Mediterranean coast and surrounded by mountains on three sides. The northern part of the district is hilly and mountainous. Summers are hot and dry, winters cool and wet as one would expect in a Mediterranean district. The coast never gets snow, though it snows in the mountains. In this climate fruit and vegetables can be grown under glass all year round and this is the mainstay of the local economy, along with orange trees. Kumluca is a wealthy district.

== Composition ==
There are 41 neighbourhoods in Kumluca District:

- Adrasan
- Altınyaka
- Bağlık
- Belen
- Beşikçi
- Beykonak
- Büyükalan
- Çaltı
- Çayiçi
- Cumhuriyet
- Dereköy
- Ellinci Yıl
- Erentepe
- Eskicami
- Göksu
- Gölcük
- Güzören
- Hacıveliler
- Hızırkahya
- İncircik
- Karacaağaç
- Karacaören
- Karşıyaka
- Kasapçayırı
- Kavakköy
- Kum
- Kuzca
- Mavikent
- Merkez
- Meydan
- Narenciye
- Ortaköy
- Salur
- Sarıcasu
- Sarıkavak
- Temel Eğitim
- Toptaş
- Yazır
- Yeni
- Yenikışla
- Yeşilköy

== History ==
In the last years of the Seljuqs of Rum, silver coins were minted in the town. Between 1282 and 1302, the town struck dirhams under Kaykhusraw III, Kayqubad III, and Mesud II with the mint name Sarıkavak (Arabic: ساروقواق, Sārūqawāq)

Archaeologists have found a shipwreck dating back to the 15th-16th B.C 50 meters away from the coast of Kumluca district in early April in 2019. Archaeologist Hakan Öniz has published an article about this research in the journal Palestine Exploration Quarterly. He announced that a new Bronze Age shipwreck had been discovered in the same coast where the Gelidoniya and Uluburun shipwrecks were found and this finding belongs to earlier times than both of them.

== Demographics ==
The district has a population of 73,496 (2022). The town itself has 42,861 inhabitants.

== Tourism ==
There are a number of important historical sites in the district of Kumluca including Olympos, Kitanaura, Korydalla, Rhodiapolis, Idebessos and Gagae; of these Olympos is the largest and attracts the most visitors.

There is 30 km (19 mi) of coast with many hotels and restaurants between the villages of Adrasan and Olympos, and holiday villages near the town of Mavikent. West of Mavikent there is less development but taken as a whole Kumluca is one of the fastest growing local economies in Turkey.
