= Gagae =

Archaeological site in Turkey

Coordinates: 36°17′56.4″N 30°21′17.3″E

Gagae or Gagai (Ancient Greek: Γάγαι) was a town on the southeast coast of ancient Lycia, in what is now the province of Antalya, from which the Gagates lapis derived its name. The ruins are located in Kumluca district, Antalya Province, Turkey. Excavations in 2007 revealed an upper and lower acropolis and evidence of Rhodian colonization.

Several ancient authors (Pliny the Elder, Pedanius Dioscorides, Galenos, Oribasius and Aetios) mention "the stone of Gagates" (λίθος γαγάτης, translit. líthos gagátis) as being able to drive serpents away, diagnose epilepsy, calm the women down in their hysterias, evacuate worms, ease heart problems and heal the gynaecological diseases. It was also used in jewellery. The stone was found by the estuary of a river called Gages, near to Gagai, and named after the river. It is described as a modern jet stone, which fits perfectly with ancient descriptions. Although it is a form of lignite, containing bitumen and petroleum, it is not used for heating. However, there has been no evidence concerning the location of Gages River and Gagates mine, though there are suggestions for Gages as it may be the ancient name of the Alakır Çay ("Alakir River") or Gavur Kayı.
