= Olympus (Lycia) =

Ancient city in Turkey

- Ὄλυμπος (Ancient Greek)
- Olympos
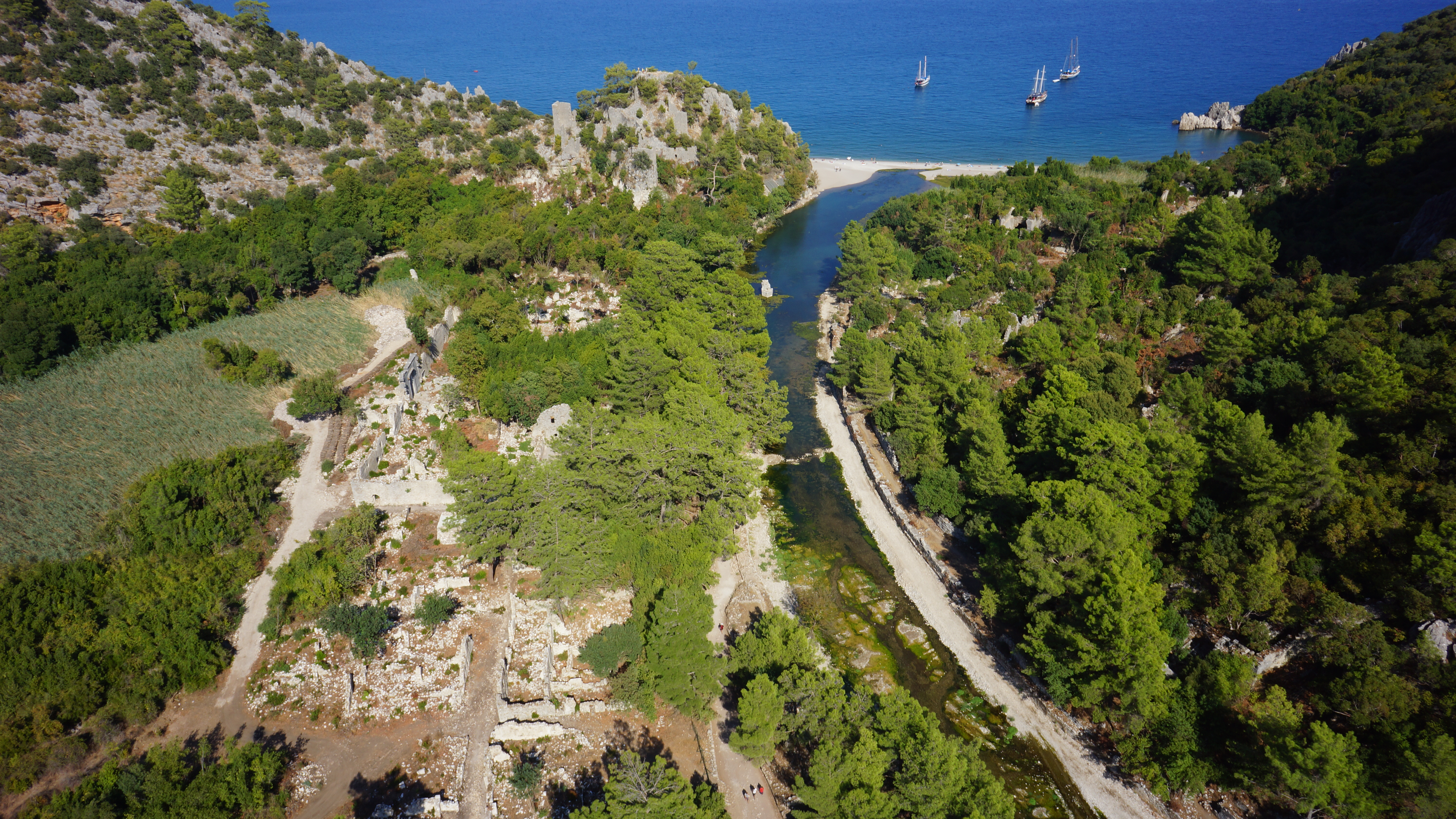
- Olympus (Lycia), aerial view from the west

- Location within Turkey
- 36°23′46″N 30°28′21″E
- Type: Settlement
- Location: Çıralı, Antalya Province, Turkey
- Region: Lycia

Site notes
- Owner: Public
- Website: (in Turkish)

Olympus or Olympos (Ancient Greek: Ὄλυμπος, Ólympos; Latin: Olympus) is an ancient city in Lycia. Although Olympus comprised an extensive territorium as identified by tomb inscriptions, it had a medium-sized city center. Buildings that constituted the urban texture spread out along both sides of the creek which extended through a deep valley that flows into the Mediterranean in the east. This structure in the urban texture of Olympus also reflects the means of transportation to the city, its connection with the Mediterranean and its relationship with trade, which is an important element for subsistence. In this respect, it takes its place among the well-known port cities such as Patara, Myra/Andriake and Phaselis in the Lycian Region. Olympus was also one of the six cities of the Lycian League that held three votes. Although the city lost its importance in the late Roman period, it flourished again in the 5th century as a bishopric. However, its redevelopment and prosperity as an early Byzantine city were short-lived, and like most Lycian port cities, it was abandoned during and/or after the Arab raids.

== Hellenistic and Roman Periods ==
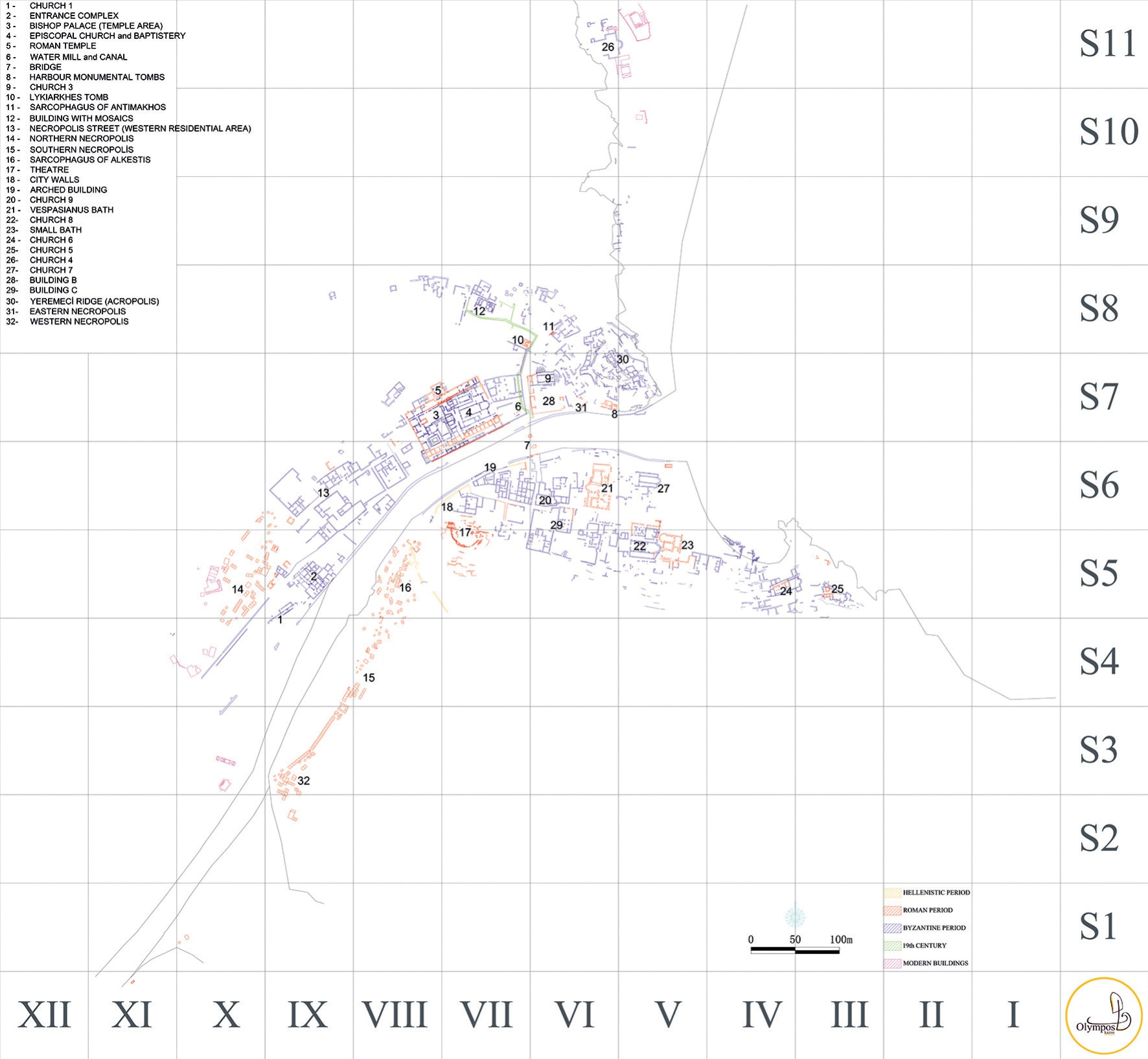
City Plan of Olympus

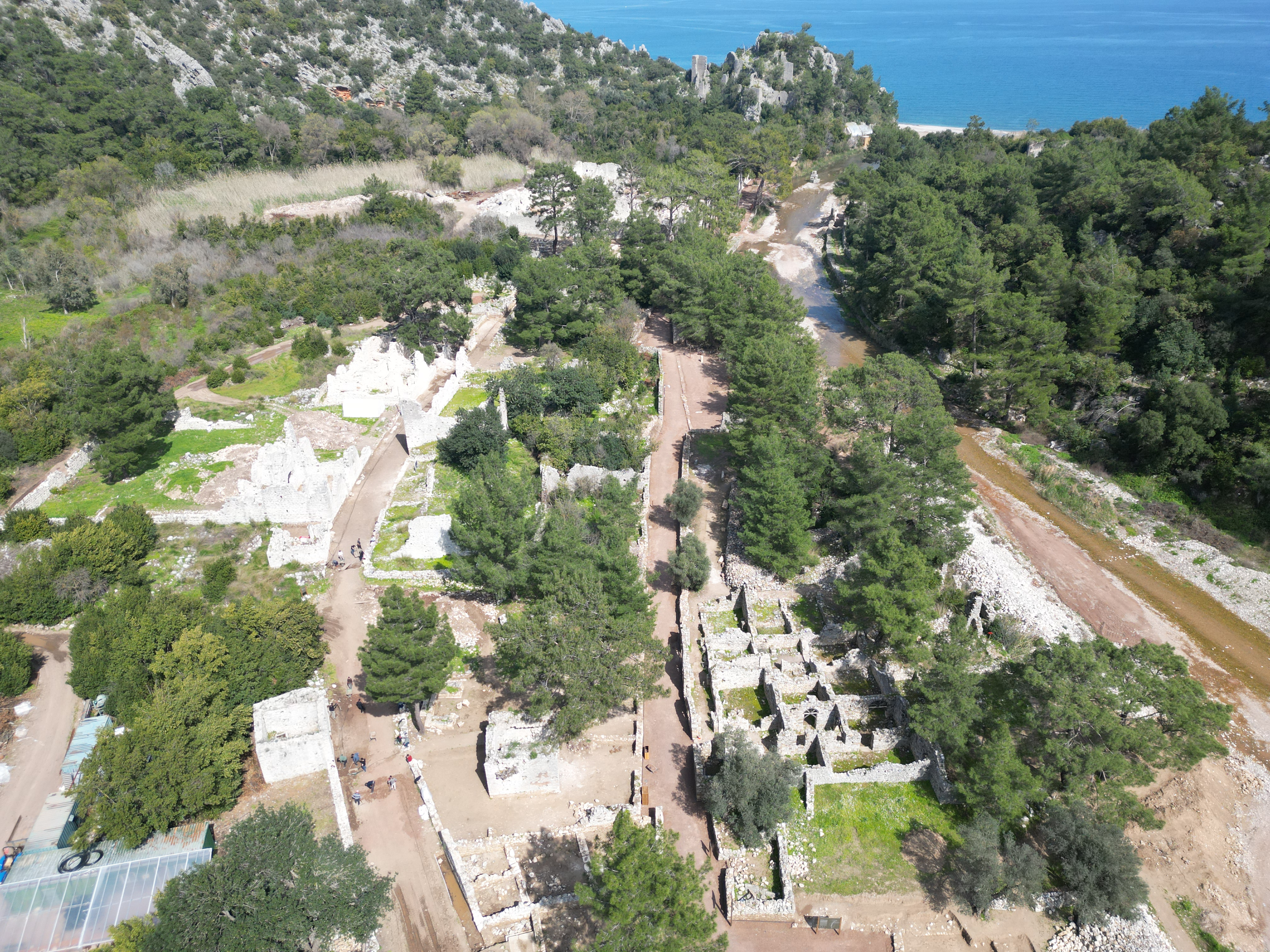
General view of the city from the west (Olympos Excavation Archive, 2023)

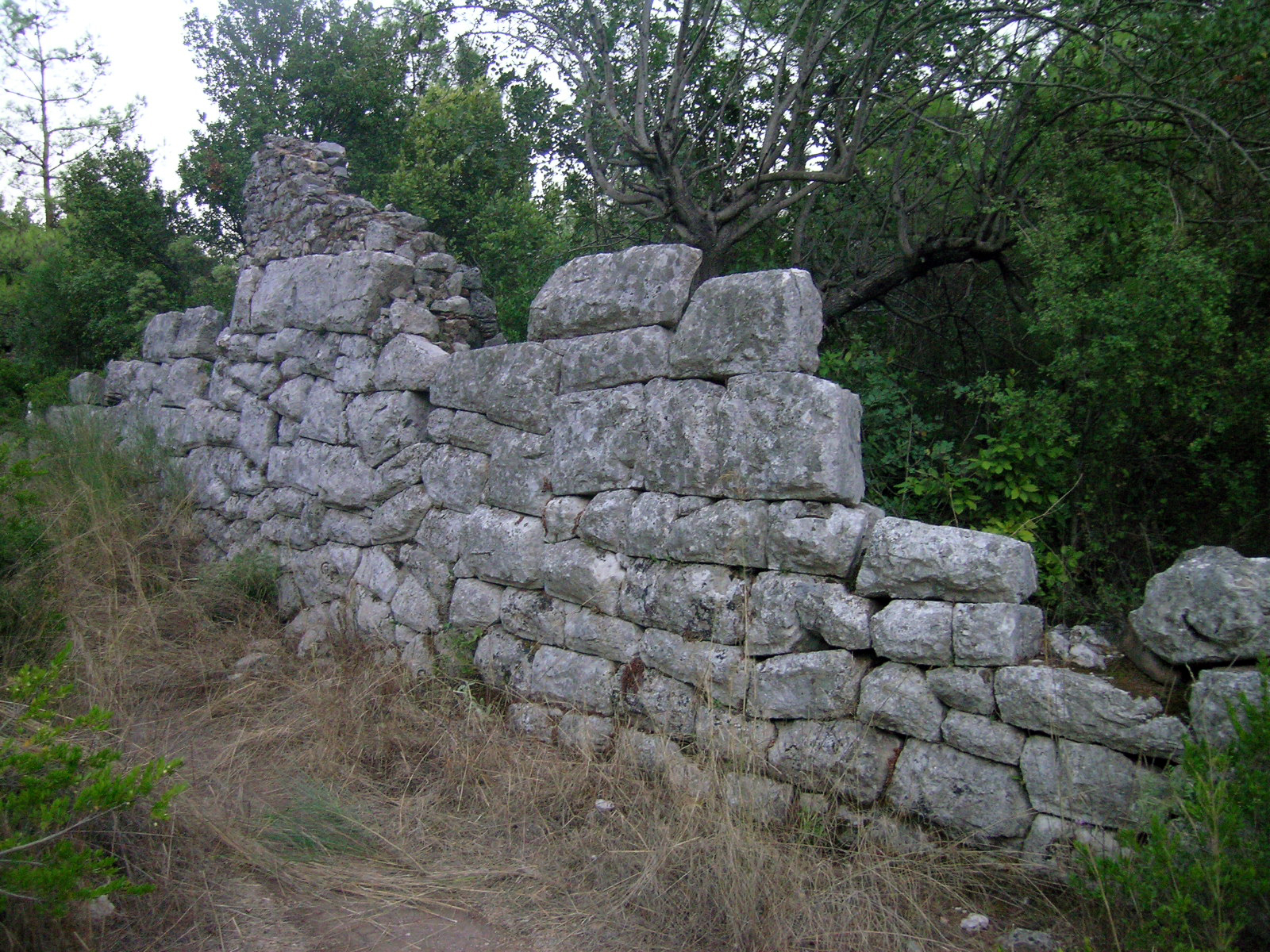
Polygonal wall section in south side of the city

The earliest extant written reference to Lycian Olympus appears in the Geographica of the distinguished geographer Strabo. Citing Artemidorus of Ephesus, Strabo identifies Olympus as one of the prominent members of the Lycian League, possessing three votes within the federal assembly. This status appears to have continued until the second half of the second century BC. In the first century BC, however, the city began to be mentioned primarily in connection with piracy. The most significant event recorded in the written sources for this period is the conflict between Zeniketes and Rome. In response to the inadequacy of the Lycian League's naval forces and the potential threat posed to the commercial interests of Roman merchants in the region, Roman legions under the command of Publius Servilius Vatia launched a campaign against the eastern Lycian cities and Pamphylia. Servilius subsequently laid siege to Zeniketes’ fortress around Olympus. Realizing that continued resistance was futile, Zeniketes chose to immolate himself along with his family rather than be captured alive by the Roman commander. Following the fall of Olympus, Servilius Vatia proceeded to subdue the settlements that had previously belonged to Zeniketes or had participated in the uprising. Those who had supported him were punished, and their lands were confiscated and declared ager publicus. Olympus, as one of these settlements, was expelled from the Lycian League and was not readmitted until the first century AD.

The historical-geographical research of epigraphists on the Olympus excavation team has revealed more than 50 inscriptions, of which some were addendum and corrigendum. Nearly all the inscriptions identified in Olympus and its territory have the ethnicons of Ὀλυμπηνός, Ὀλυμπηνή and Ὀλυμπηνοί. However, only one inscription mentions Korykos.

Some funerary inscriptions and material evidence recovered from the city walls during archaeological investigations offer significant insights into the Hellenistic phase of the settlement. The earliest architectural remains identified at Olympus are the fortification walls, which enclose the area conventionally referred to as the South City. These defenses were constructed using polygonal masonry techniques. Excavations were undertaken at the point where the walls intersect with the Roman bridge. Furthermore, systematic investigations were carried out along the entire stretch known as Bridge Street, a thoroughfare understood to have been laid out during the Roman Imperial period. These studies yielded not only architectural observations concerning the masonry but also stratigraphic and material data crucial for dating the fortifications. The results demonstrated that the gate of the fortification wall in this sector had been partially destroyed during the construction of Bridge Street. This evidence clearly indicates that the city walls predate the Roman Imperial period. When considered in light of the interdicted status imposed on the city following the suppression of Zeniketes, the terminus post quem for the construction of the fortifications can be established as 76 BC.

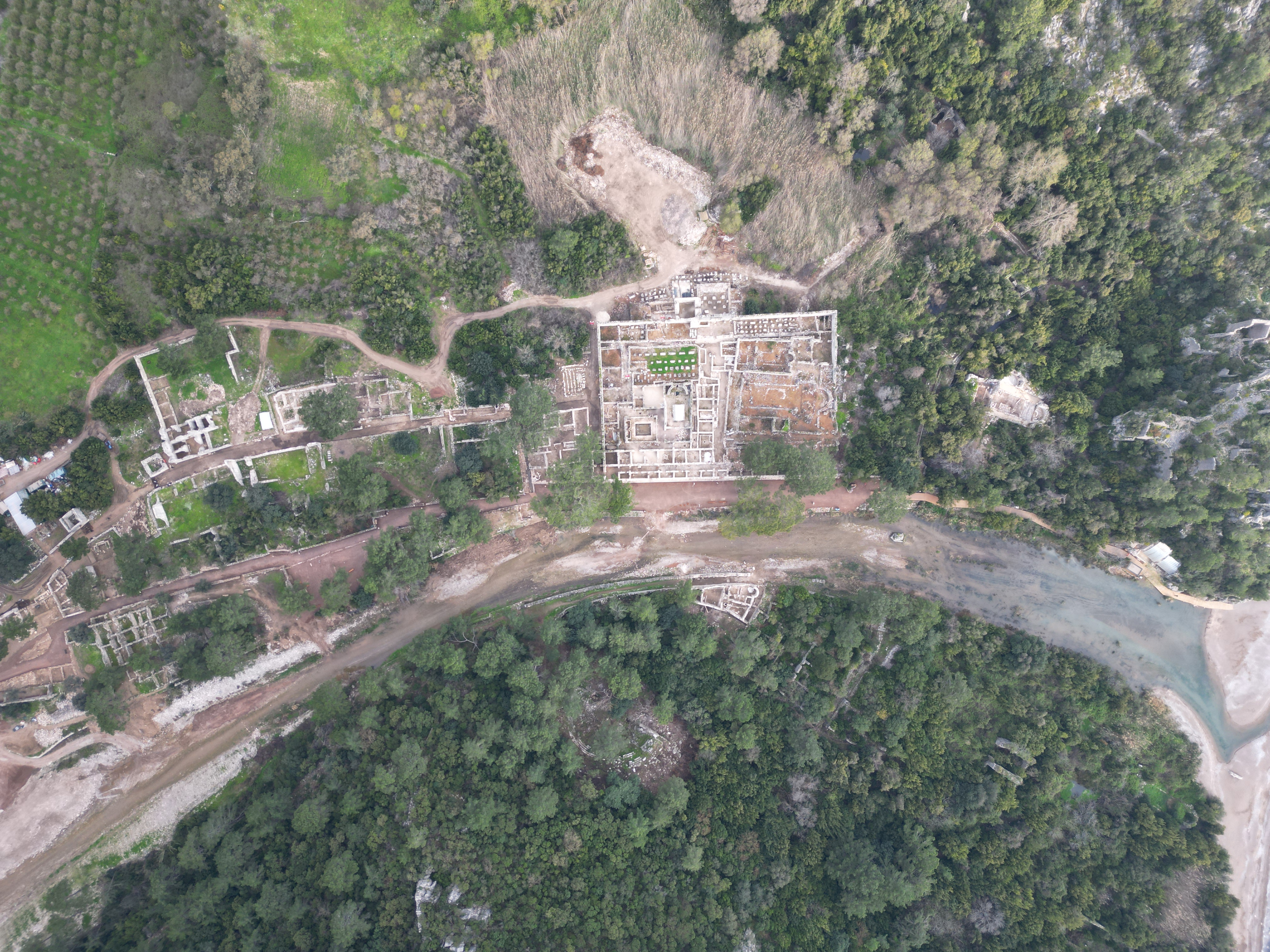
Aerial View of Olympos https://olymposkazisi.com/yapilar/

Olympus was once again an elite member of the League in the 2 nd century AD, as is evident from the inscriptions on the tomb of Marcus Aurelius Archepolis who held the position of Lyciarch, the highest position in the League.

Archaeological evidence clearly demonstrates that Olympus emerged as a significant urban center during the Roman Imperial period. Under Roman administration, the city was reorganized according to a more regular and planned urban layout. Moreover, recent investigations have yielded substantial new data concerning several major public structures, most notably the baths, the temple, Bridge Street, and the bridge. The discussion of these monuments follows a broadly chronological framework, beginning with the baths in order to establish a contextual assessment.

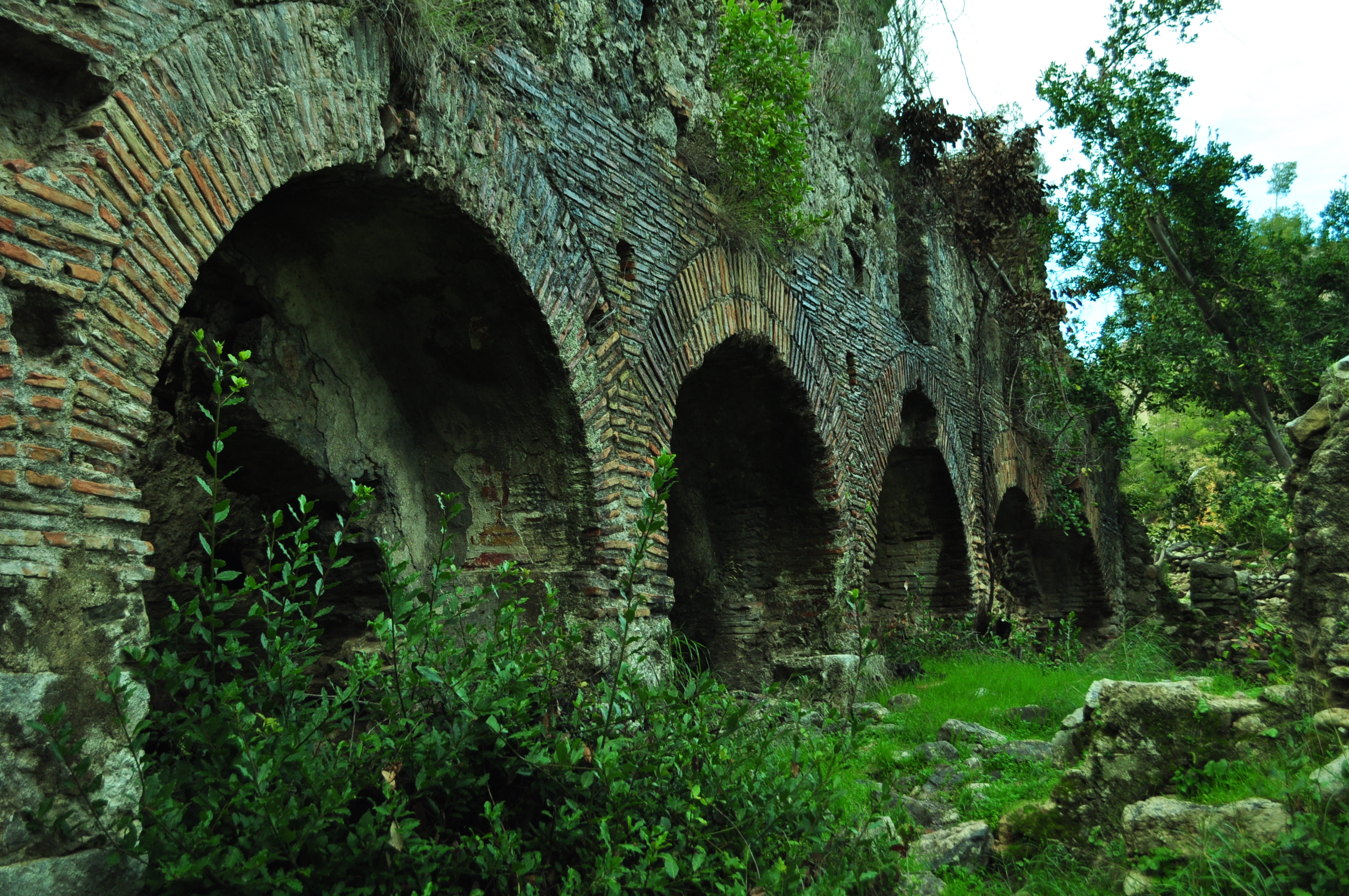
Vespasian Bath of Olympus

According to the existing structure remains, the urban texture along with its necropolises had spread into both sides of the valley, beginning from the 1st century AD within the limits of the geographical borders that define the topography. During the Roman period, Northern Harbor Street was the main artery that stretched across the city on an east–west axis. Necropolis Street runs parallel to Harbor Street, extending from the necropolis on the west all the way to the temple site. Northern Harbor Street intersects with the north–south oriented Bridge Street and the two sides of the city are connected with a triple arch bridge. Bridge Street leads to a large square in the southern part of the city. From this square, it proceeds southwards and intersects with Harbor Street. The urban texture, which is understood to have a hippodamic plan, has right-angled streets and alleys according to the existing building remains. The first feature that stands out when the Roman period settlement characteristics are concerned is that the public structures like baths were accumulated in the southern part of the city, whereas the tombs and temples are concentrated in the northern section.

== Early Christian and Early Byzantine Periods ==
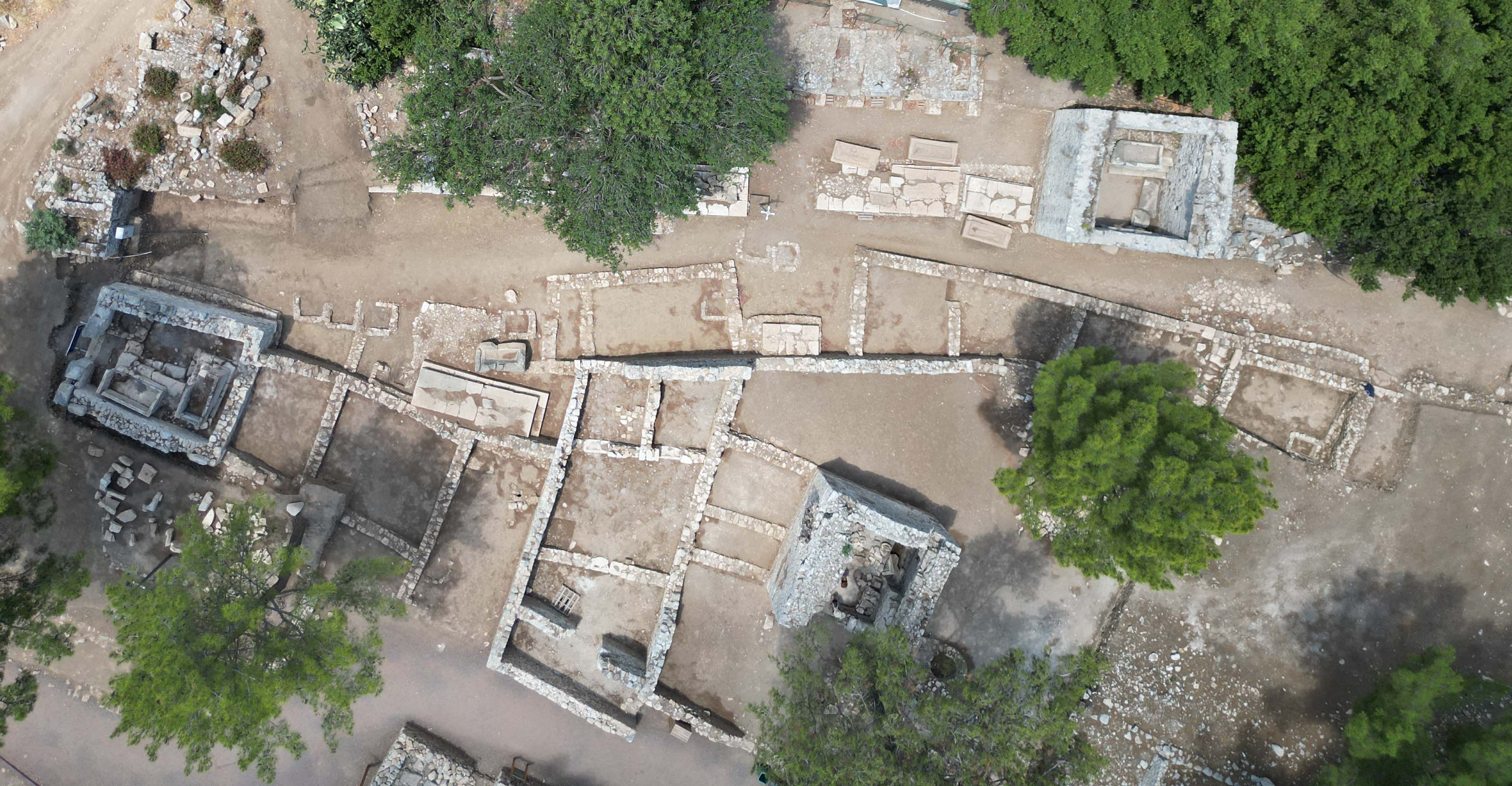
Tombs, houses and workshops on western part of Olympus Necropolis Street.

By the 3rd century AD, Christianity arrived in the city. The city was a diocese under the Metropolis of Myra in Lycia. Methodius, known as Methodius of Olympus, was the first bishop of Lycia and Olympus in the late 3rd century AD. The texts he wrote in response to anti-Christian writings are important in terms of the first efforts to recognize Christianity. Methodius was probably martyred in 312 AD. The names of the bishops known after Methodios are important for the history of Olympus. Other known bishops are Aristocritus who attended the Ephesus Council in 431 AD, Anatolius who was mentioned in the letter sent by the Myra metropolitan administration to Leo I dated 458 AD, and Ioannes who participated in the Constantinople Synods of 518 and 520 AD. Also, another bishop of Olympus named Anania/Anianus or Ioannes was also identified on a lead seal dated to the beginning of the late 6th-7th century AD. The names of bishops Theophiletus and Nicholas can be read on a chancel screen and a door lintel which were uncovered during archaeological excavations in the Episcopal Church. The name Olympus also appears in the bishopric lists of the 5th-7th centuries AD. The name of the city was last mentioned in the 9th century AD when it was affiliated with the Metropolitan of Myra.

It is possible to say that the urban texture of Byzantine Olympus, formed by an intense development program that took place in the 5th and 6th centuries, was based largely on the Roman period city. Although the streets, roads and the settlement plan in the city had changed, they still seem to correspond to the layout of the Roman city in general. While some widening and/or narrowing can be observed in the streets as compared to the Roman period, general directions and layouts of the streets remained the same. The most important change with the Byzantine period is the expansion of living spaces in the city. Considering the location of the buildings, it is possible to say that the early Byzantine city was larger and had inhabited a larger population than the Roman period. The civic texture of the southern city had expanded towards the slopes of the Sepet Ridge toward the south-east direction. In the northern city, civil buildings were built on Necropolis Street and Roman period tombs were utilized as living spaces.

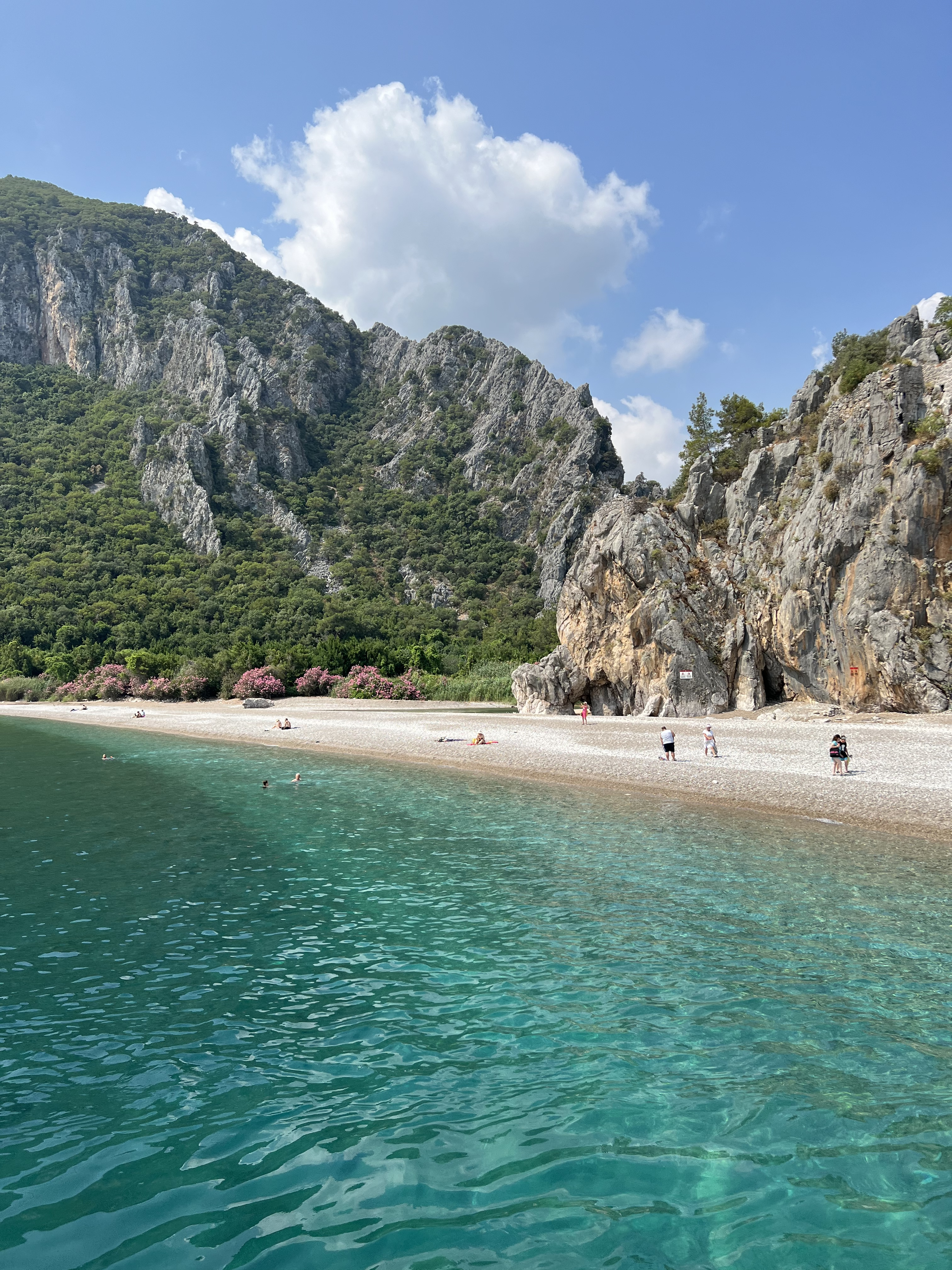
Olympus Beach

There are nine churches in the city center belonging to the early Byzantine period. Olympus is known to have an extensive territorium, yet it is remarkable that as a medium-sized settlement its city center has nine churches. All churches are three-aisled basilicas and two of them have a transept. All of the churches have opus tesselatum mosaics on their floors and were richly decorated. The southern hillside settlement is situated in a terraced area supported by retaining walls. There are east–west oriented passages between the terraces and stairways that allow access between these passages. Beam holes and buttresses show that problems due to differences in elevation in the naos of the churches located on these terraces were solved by wooden flooring. Four of the churches in Olympus have atriums. The atrium of Church No. 8 is on the north side, while the atriums of Church 1, 3 and 6 are located to the west side. Churches with an atrium do not have narthexes, while others have narthexes to their west. The main reason for the absence of an atrium and narthex together is the scarcity of land in the city. The churches constructed on the layout of the Roman period have individual plans according to the parceling of the insulae in the city and some distortions were observed in the plans of the churches due to the remains of the previous buildings.

No longer a residential bishopric, Olympus is today listed by the Catholic Church as a titular see.

== Modern times ==
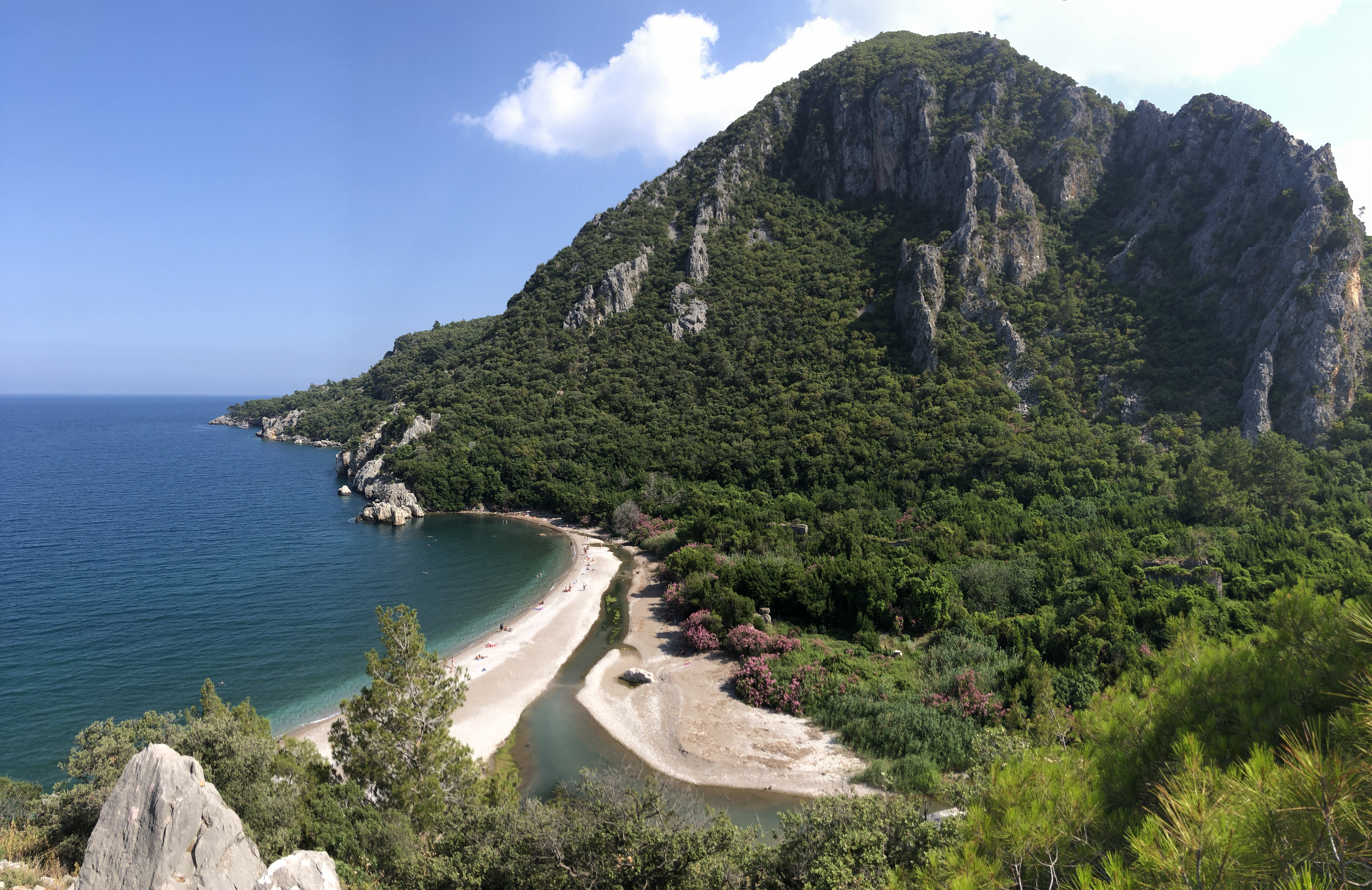
Olympus Beach

Olympus is now a popular tourist area. The ruins of the ancient city end in a valley that holds numerous pensions and guest houses. The valley is bound on the water side by Mount Omurga.

== See also ==
- List of Lycian place names
- Lycian Way

== Sources ==
- Adak, Mustafa (2004). "Lokalisierung von Olympos und Korykos in Ostlykien". Gephyra (in German). 1 (1). Archived from the original on 2016-03-04.
- Adak, Mustafa; Tüner, Nihal (2004). "Neue Inschriften aus Olympos und seinem Territorium I". Gephyra (in German). 1 (1). Archived from the original on 2016-03-04.
- Marcus Tullius Cicero (1903). "Against Verres". In Yonge, C. D. (ed.). The Orations of Marcus Tullius Cicero. London: George Bell & Sons.
- Özer, Elif (2013). "The Lycian League and Olympus in Eastern Lycia" (PDF). Mediterranean Journal of Humanities. 3 (1): 211–224. doi:10.13114/MJH/20131663.
- Strabo (1929). Jones, H. L. (ed.). Geography. Vol. 14. Cambridge, Massachusetts: Harvard University Press. ISBN 978-0-674-99246-7.
