= Turkish Riviera =

Region of Turkiye

Coordinates: 36°40′30″N 31°37′49″E

Turkish Riviera Türk Rivierası (Turkish)
- Riviera
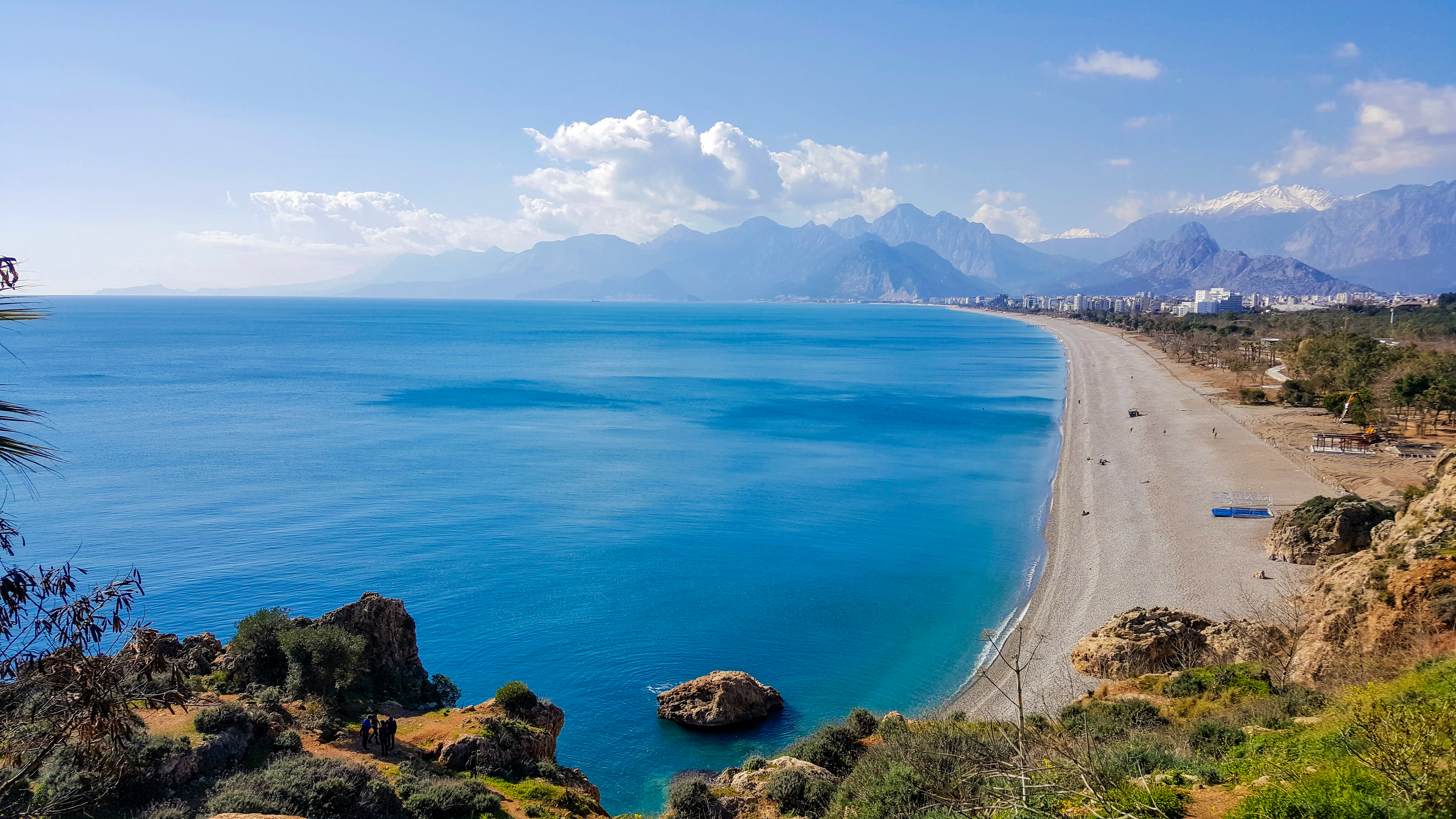
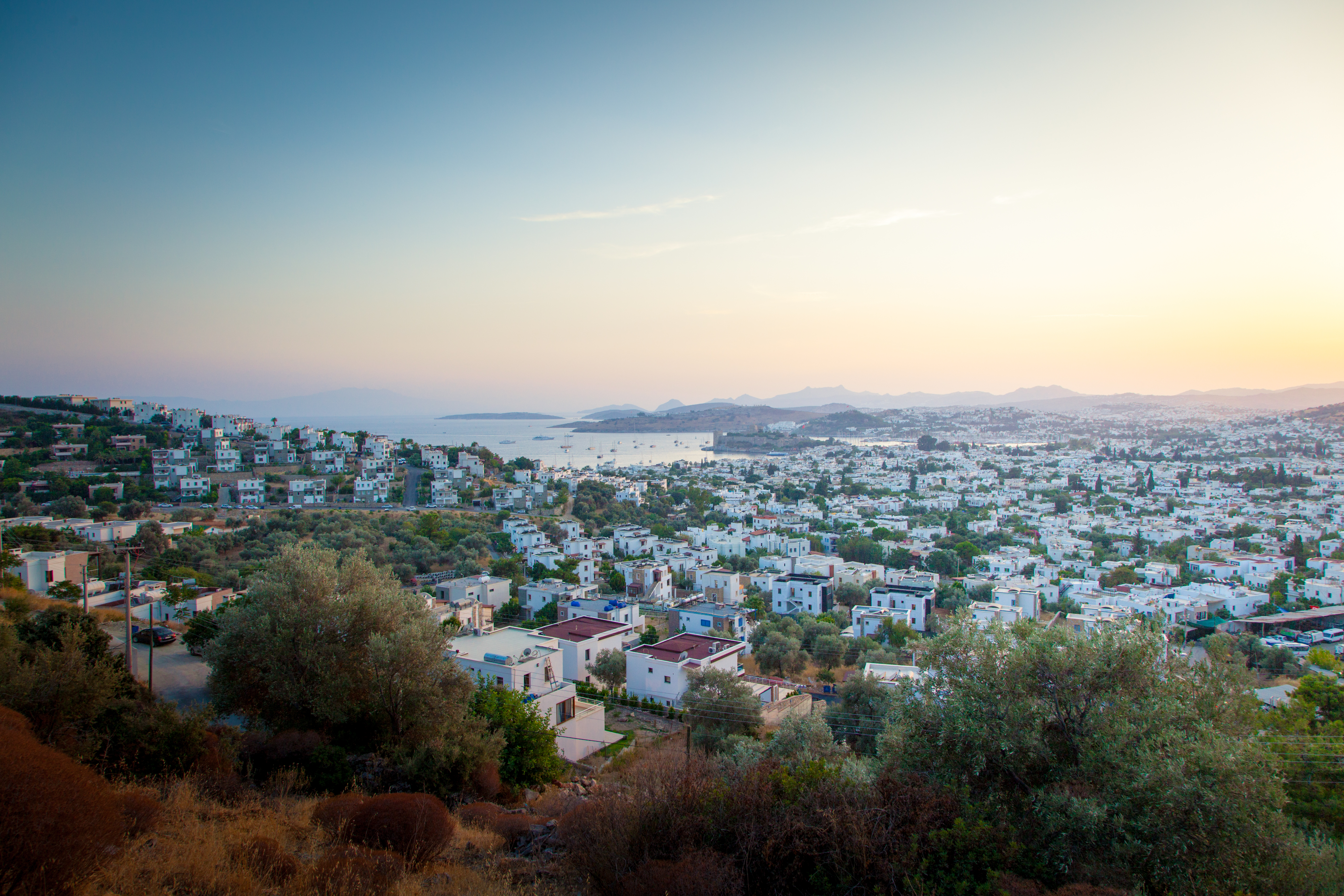
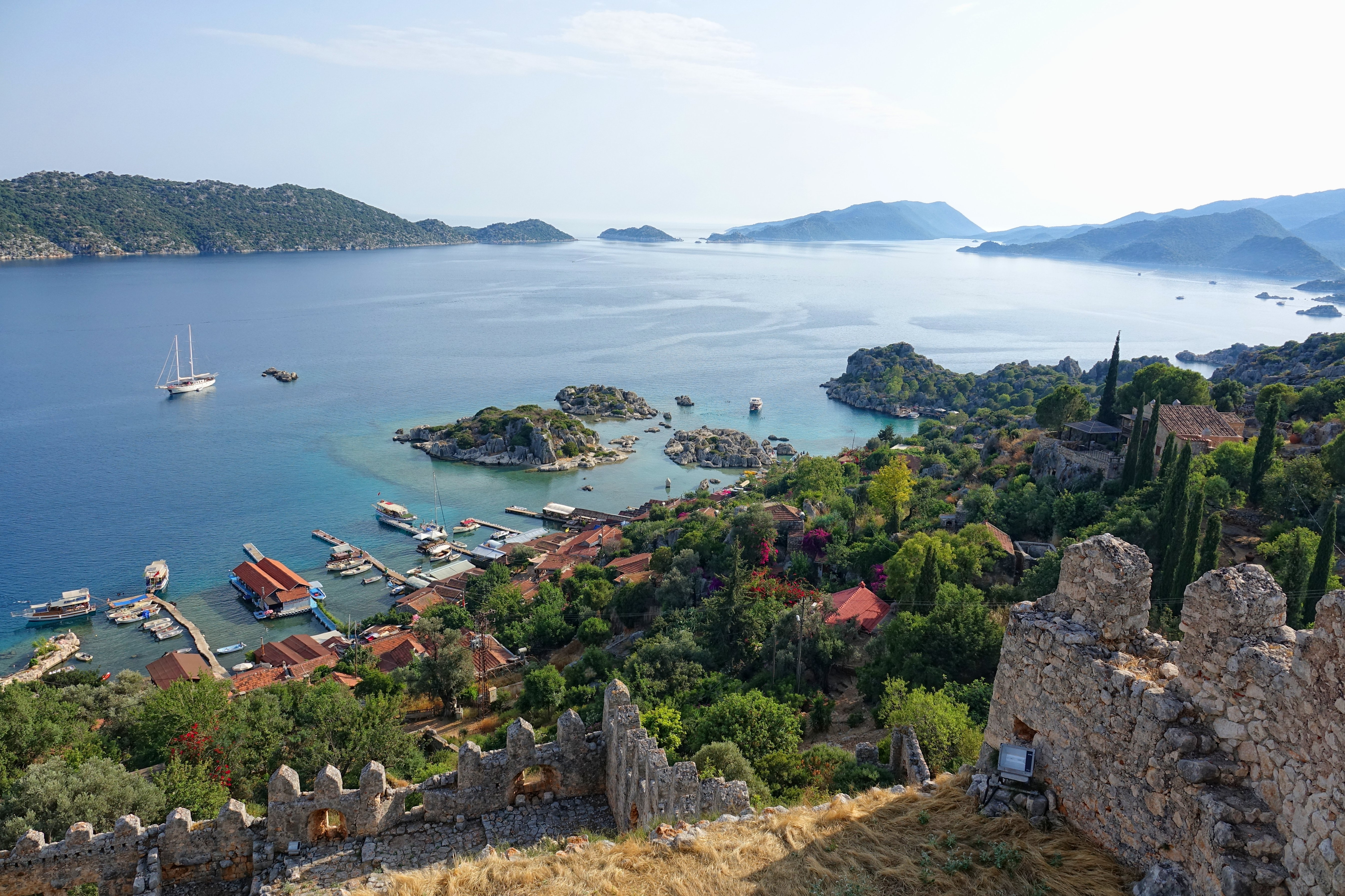
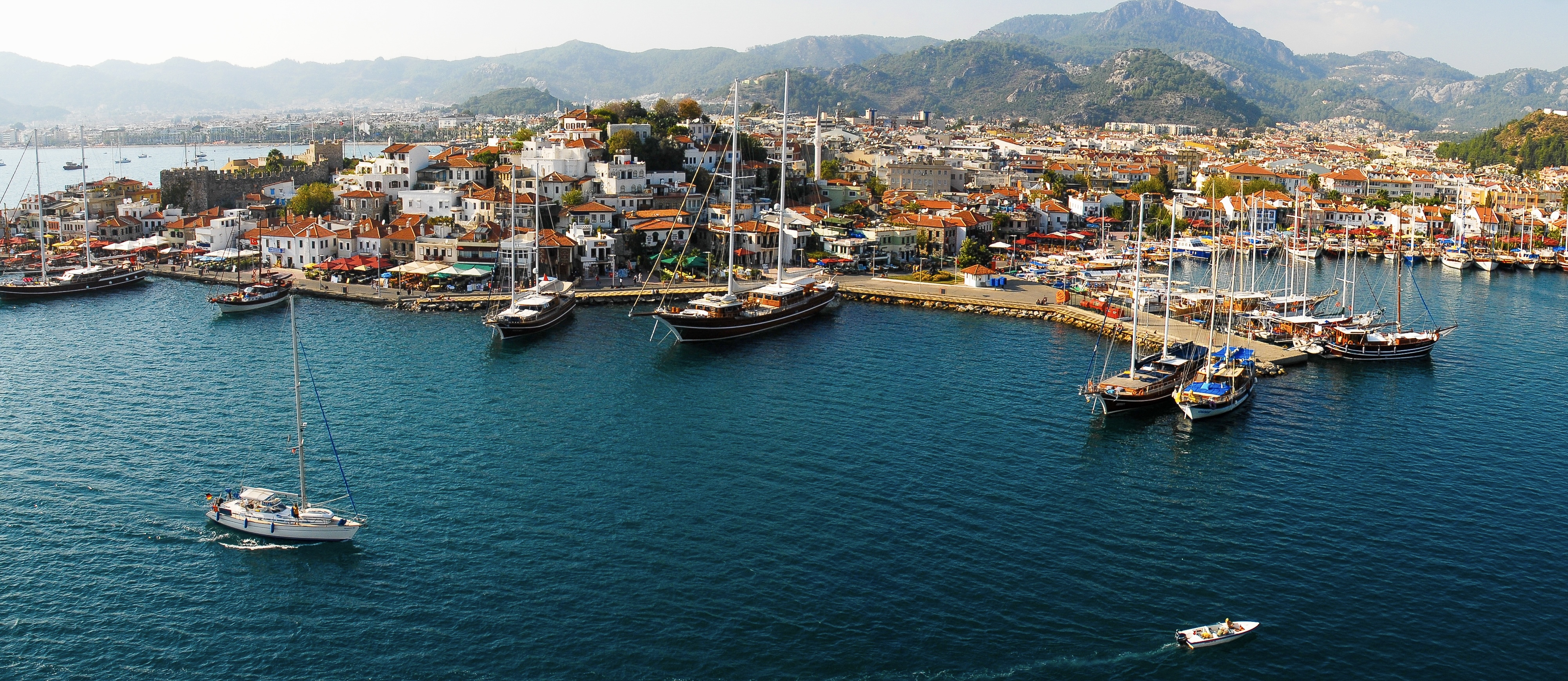
- Clockwise from top: a view of Antalya Konyaaltı Beach; Sunset over Bodrum; Kekova island and Kaleköy village; and the Harbor of Marmaris

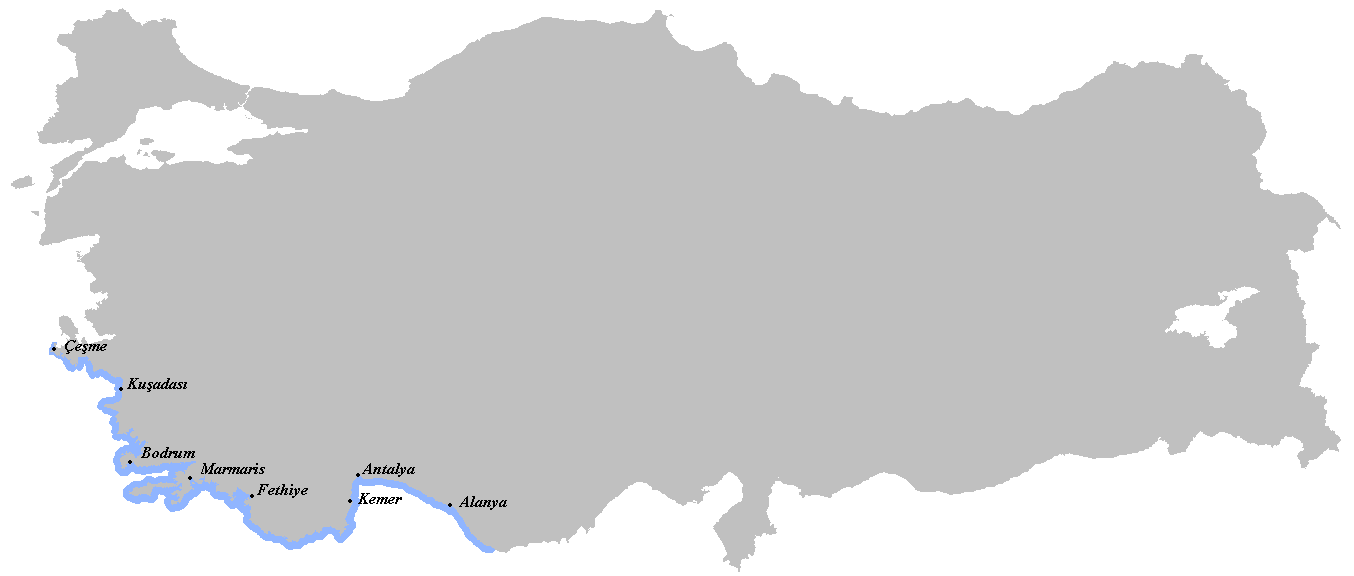
- Country: Turkey
- Province: Antalya, Aydın, İzmir, Mersin, Muğla

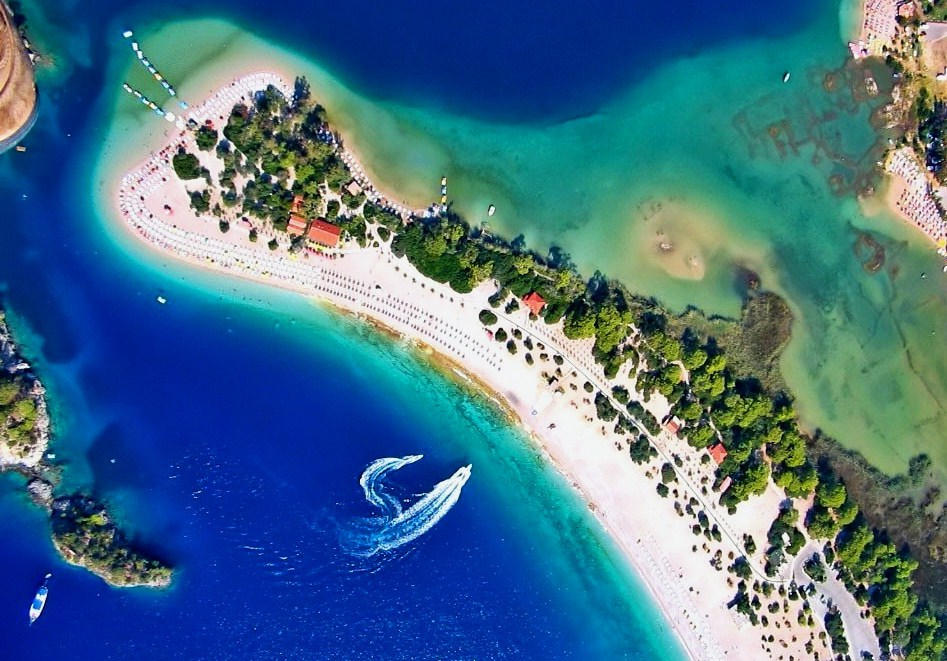
Ölüdeniz Beach in Fethiye

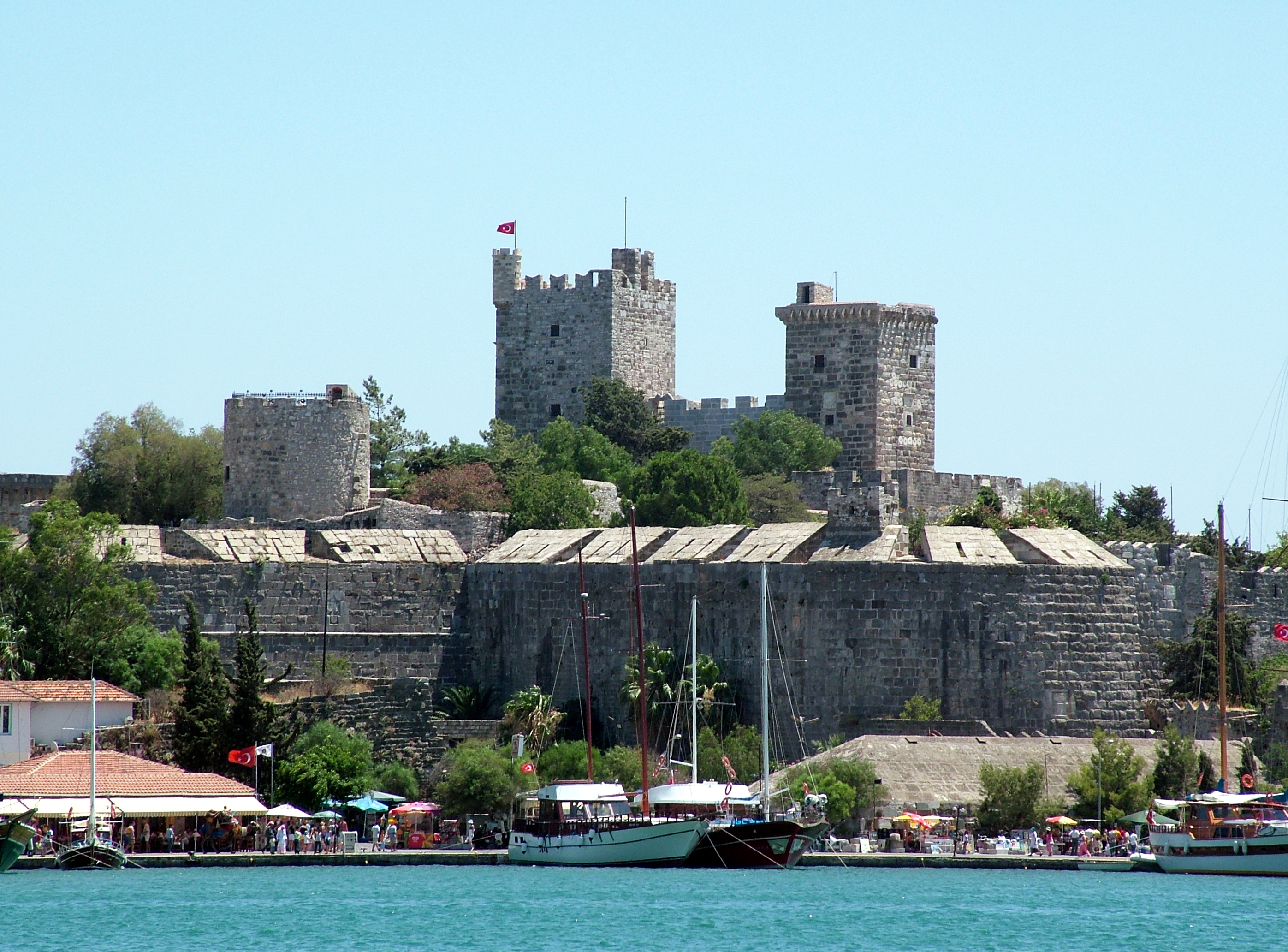
Castle of Bodrum, ancient Halicarnassus, the city of Herodotus and the home of the Mausoleum of Maussollos, one of the Seven Wonders of the Ancient World

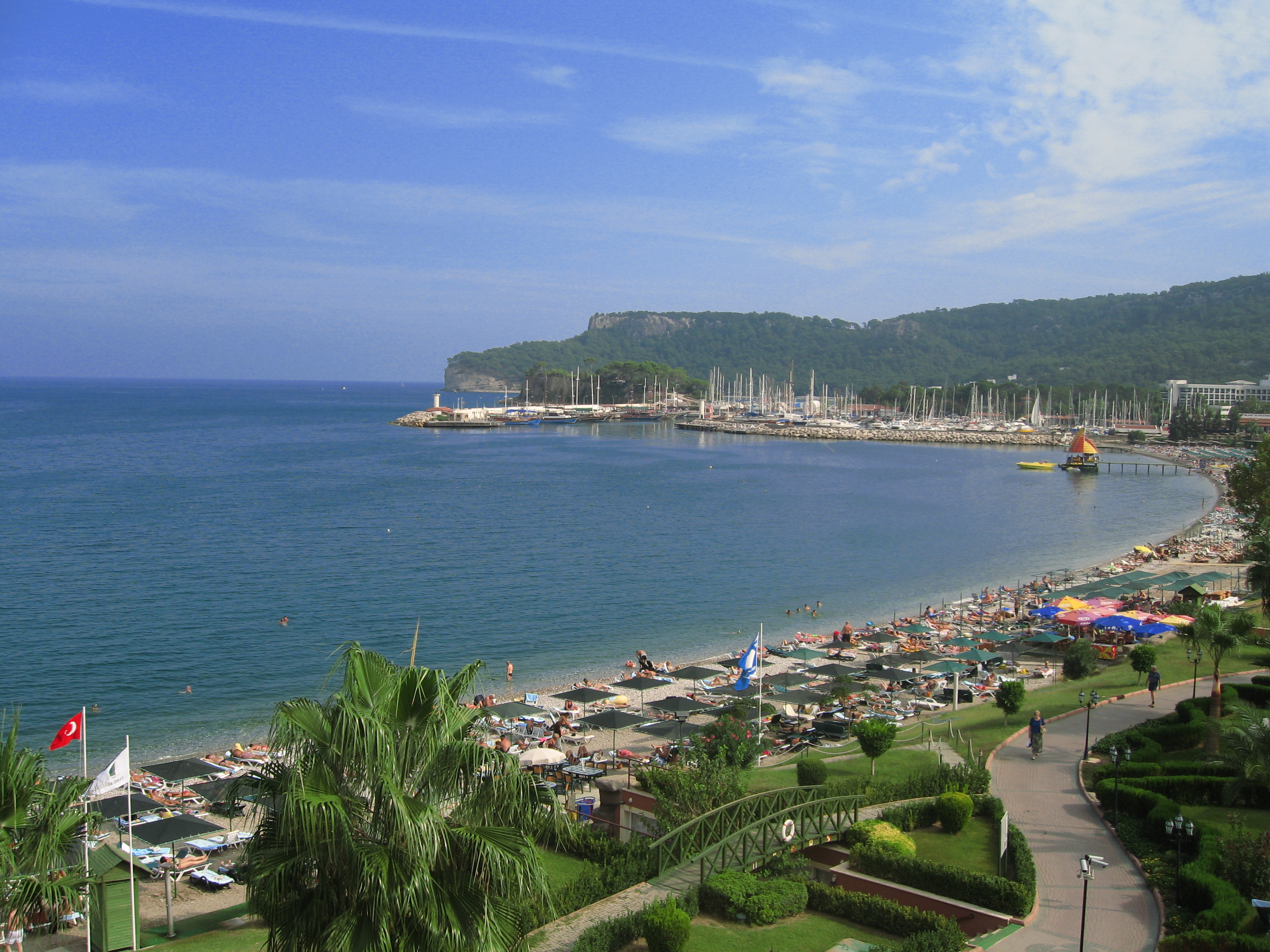
Beach and marina of Kemer

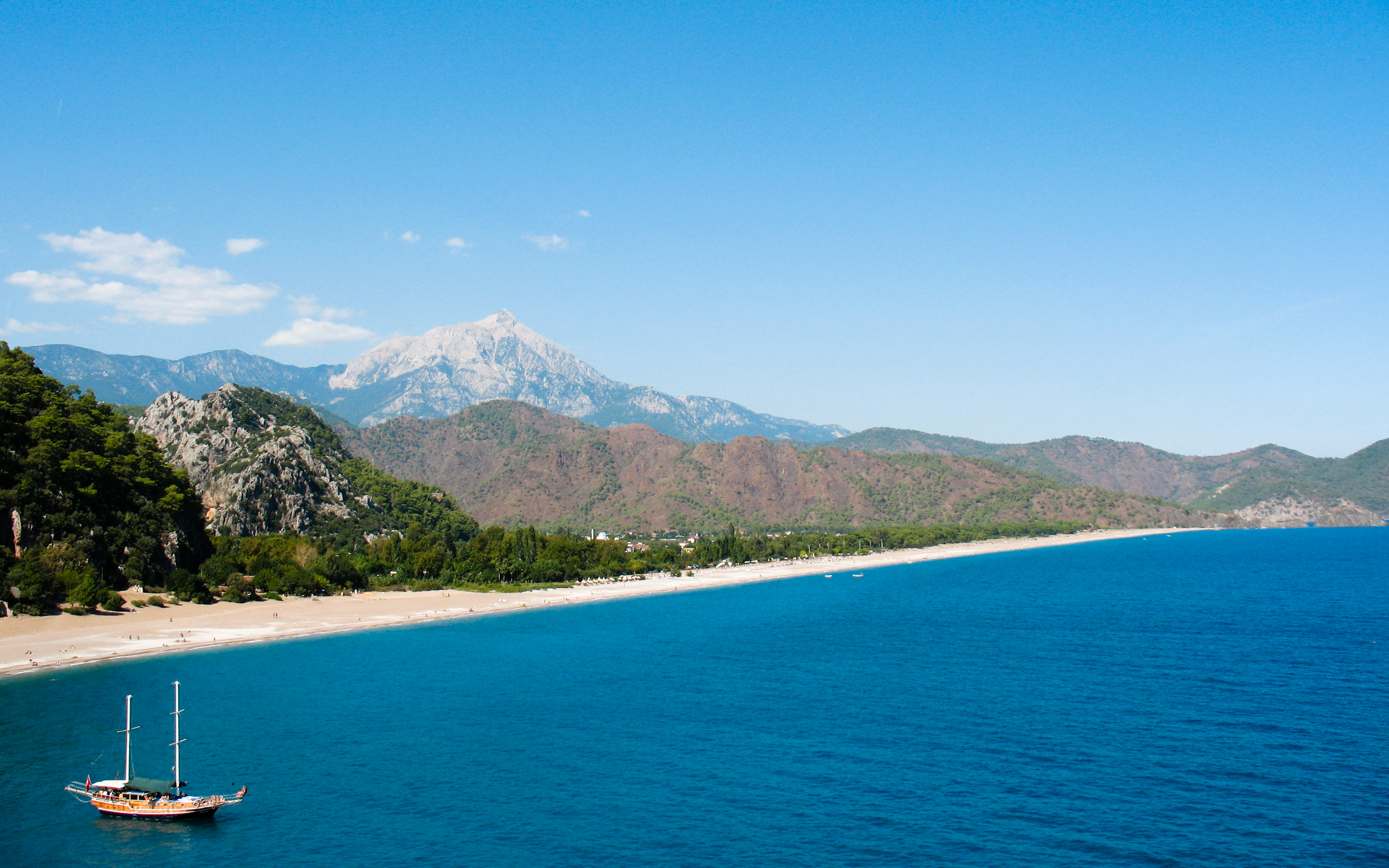
Mt. Olympos (Mt. Tahtalı) was the namesake of the town of Olympos in Lycia

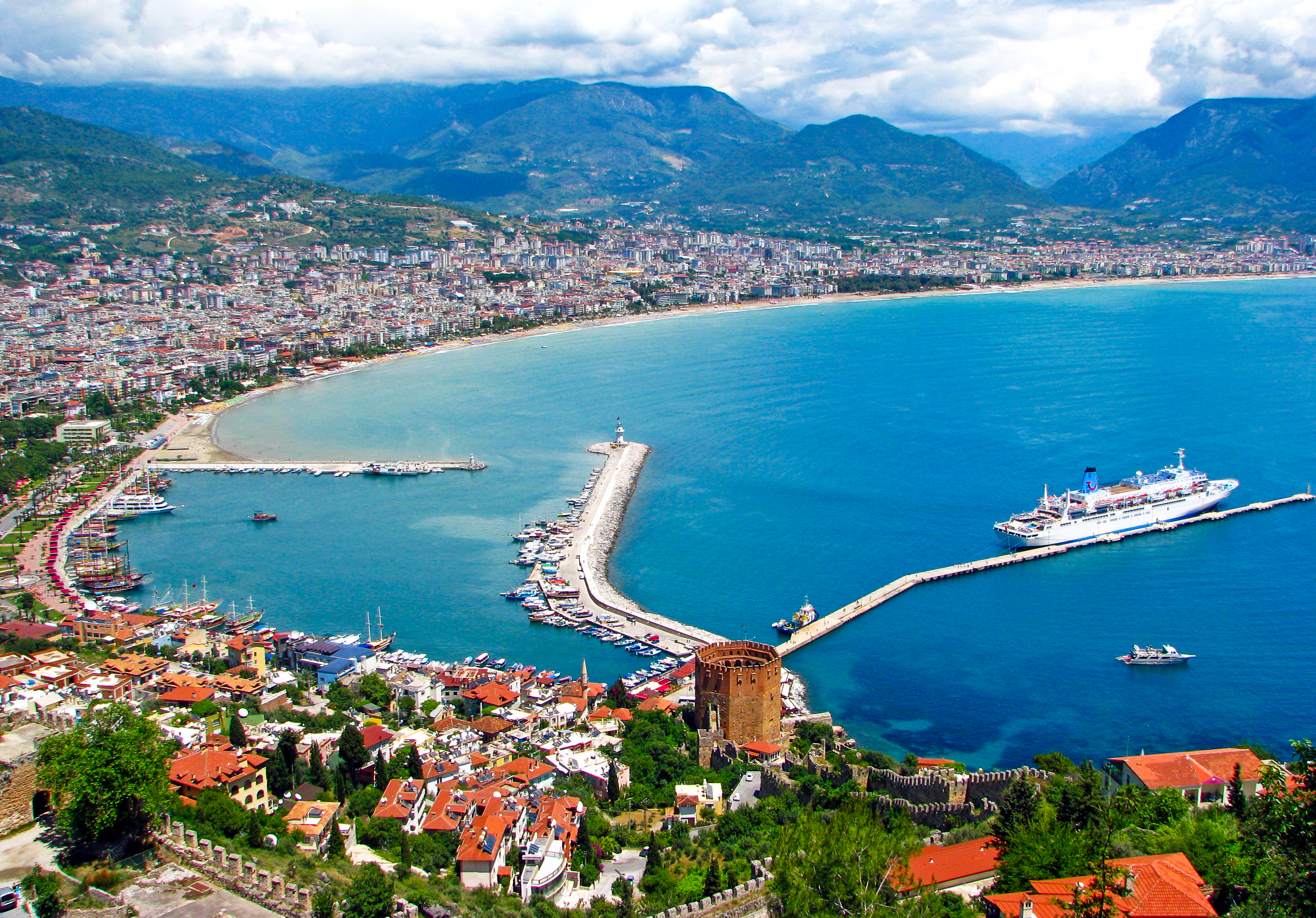
Castle and harbour of Alanya

The Turkish Riviera (Turkish: Türk Rivierası), also known popularly as the Turquoise Coast, is an area of southwest Turkey encompassing the provinces of Antalya, Muğla, Aydın, southern İzmir and western Mersin. The region of Turkey, located along the Mediterranean and Aegean coasts, is characterized by its climate, coastal geography, mountainous terrain, beaches, and numerous natural and archaeological sites. Extending over approximately 1,000 km (620 mi) of shoreline, it is frequently visited by both domestic and international tourists.

Among the archaeological points of interest are two of the Seven Wonders of the Ancient World: The ruins of the Mausoleum at Halicarnassus; and the Temple of Artemis in Ephesus.

The coastline is regarded as a cultural trove that provides background on a fascinating mixture of factual and mythological individuals, conflicts and events, and has frequently been referred to in the folklore of various cultures throughout history. As such, it is regarded as the home of scholars, saints, warriors, kings, and heroes, as well as the site of numerous well-known myths. Mark Antony of the Roman Republic is said to have picked the Turkish Riviera as the most beautiful wedding gift for his beloved Cleopatra of Egypt. Saint Nicholas, who later became the basis of the Santa Claus legend, was born in Patara, a small town close to present-day Demre. Herodotus, regarded as the "father of History", was born in Bodrum (ancient Halicarnassus) in c. 484 BC. The volcanic mountains to the west of Antalya, near Dalyan, are believed to have been the inspiration for the mythical Chimera—the fire-breathing monster that Bellerophon slew.

== Communities and settlements ==
Many cities, towns and villages in the area are internationally known, such as Alanya, Antalya, Belek, Bodrum, Çeşme, Dalyan, Didim, Fethiye, Kalkan, Kaş, Kemer, Kuşadası, Marmaris, and Side.

Notable places on the Turkish Riviera include:

- Akbük
- Akyaka
- Alaçatı
- Alanya
- Antalya
- Armutalan
- Beldibi
- Belek
- Beycik
- Bitez
- Bodrum
- Bozburun
- Çamyuva
- Çeşme
- Çıralı
- Dalaman
- Dalyan
- Datça
- Demre
- Didim
- Fethiye
- Finike
- Gazipaşa
- Göcek
- Gökova
- Gümüşlük
- Güzelçamlı
- Hisarönü
- Ilıca
- İçmeler
- Kalkan
- Kaş
- Kekova
- Kemer
- Kızkumu
- Kumluca
- Kuşadası
- Konyaaltı
- Köyceğiz
- Lara
- Manavgat
- Marmaris
- Milas
- Muğla
- Olympos
- Ortaca
- Ovacık
- Ölüdeniz
- Ören
- Özdere
- Patara
- Selçuk (Ephesus)
- Selimiye
- Side
- Simena
- Torba
- Turgutreis
- Turunç
- Türkbükü
- Ulupınar
- Yalıkavak

== Gallery ==
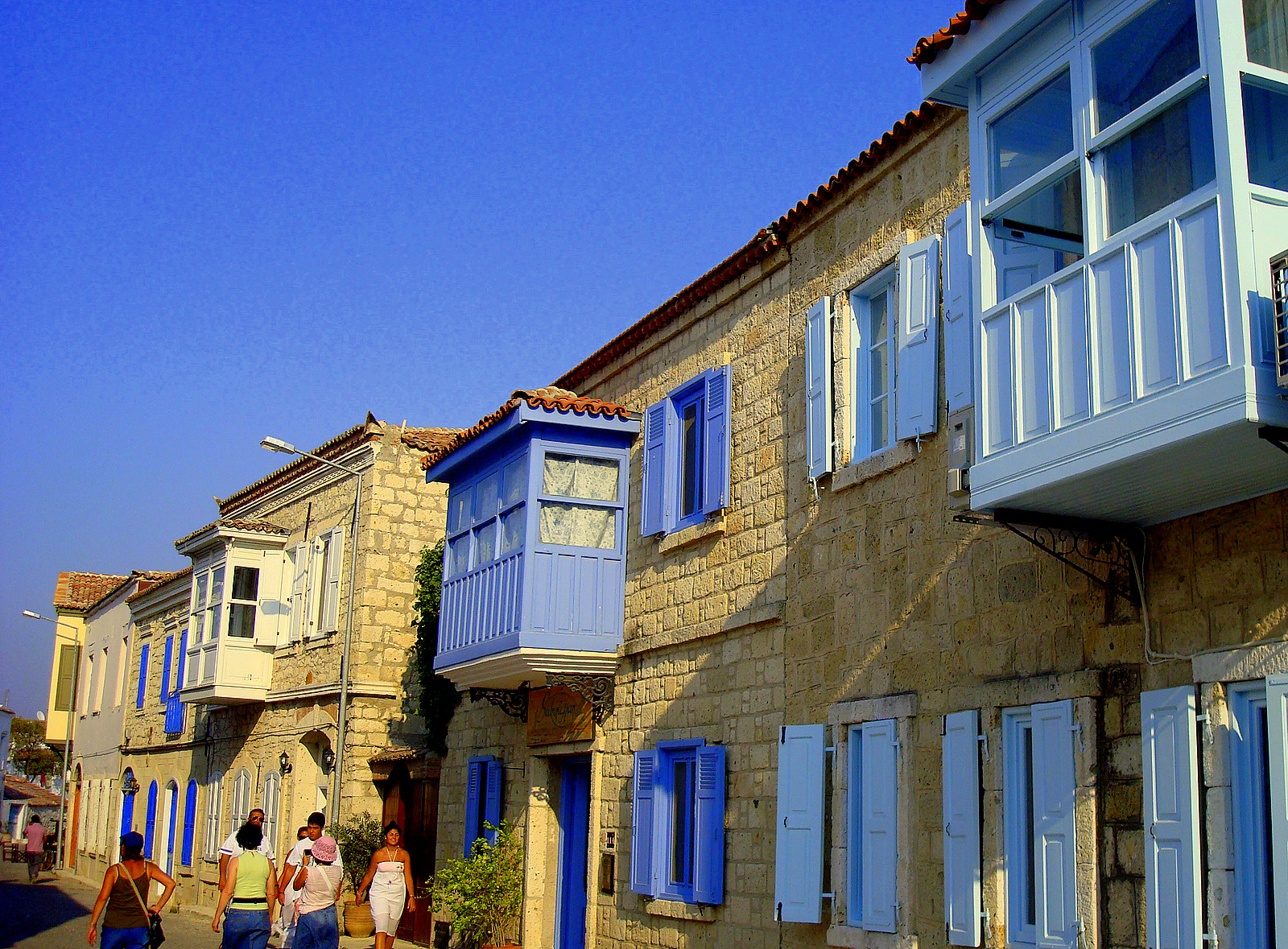
Typical architecture of Alaçatı

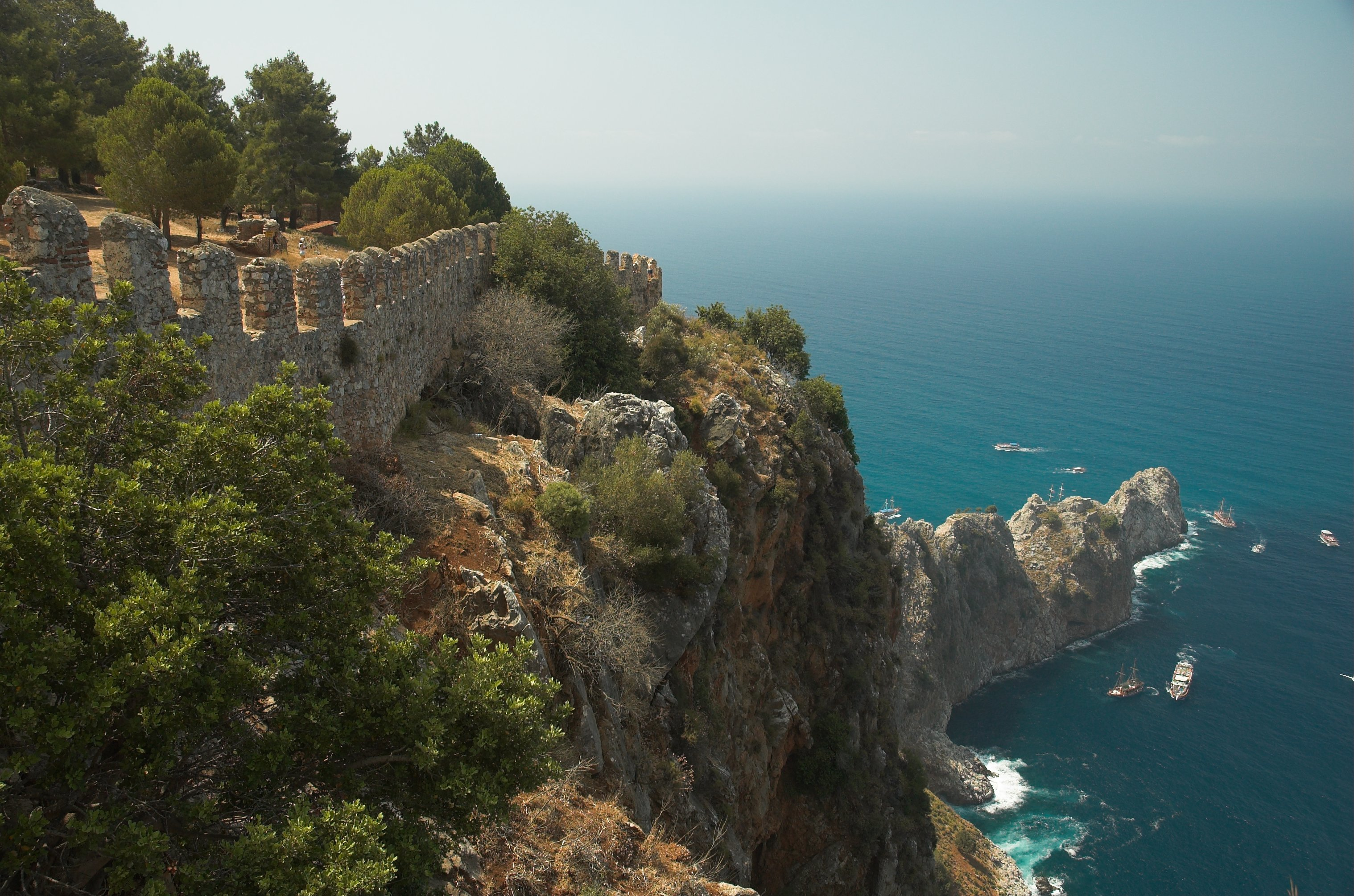
Tip of the Alanya peninsula

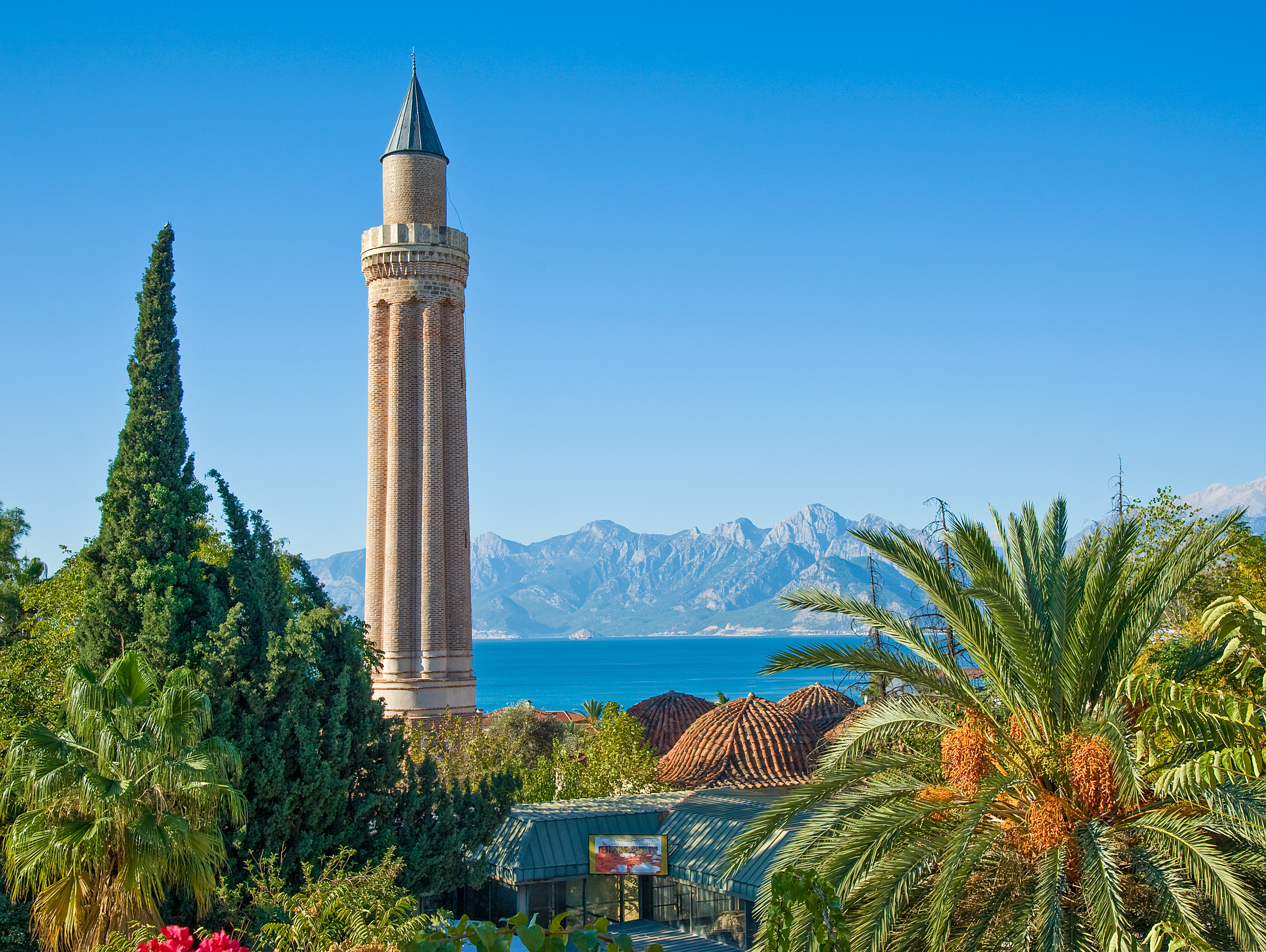
Yivli Minaret Mosque, near the Gulf of Antalya

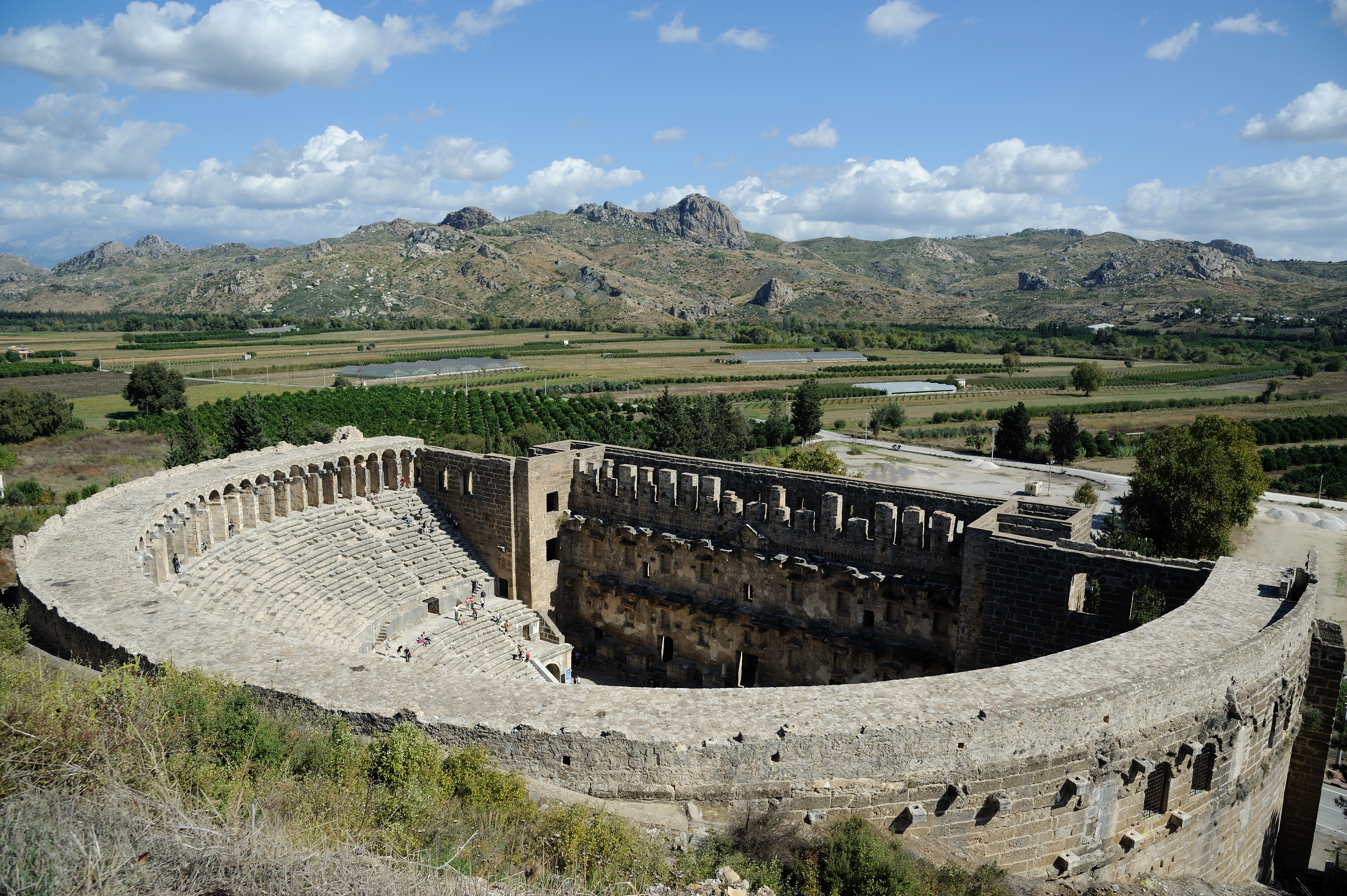
Roman theatre in Aspendos, Antalya

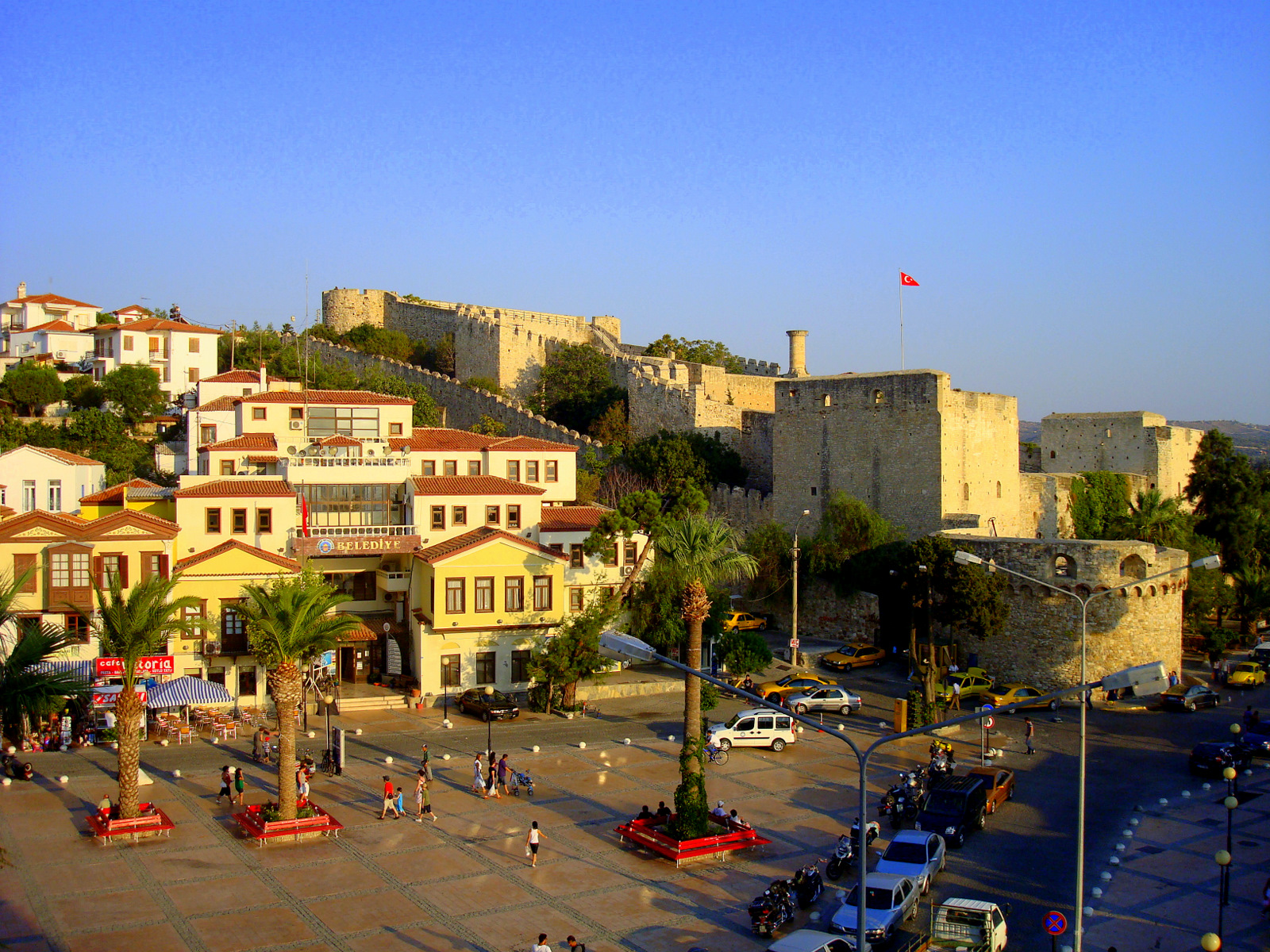
Castle of Çeşme

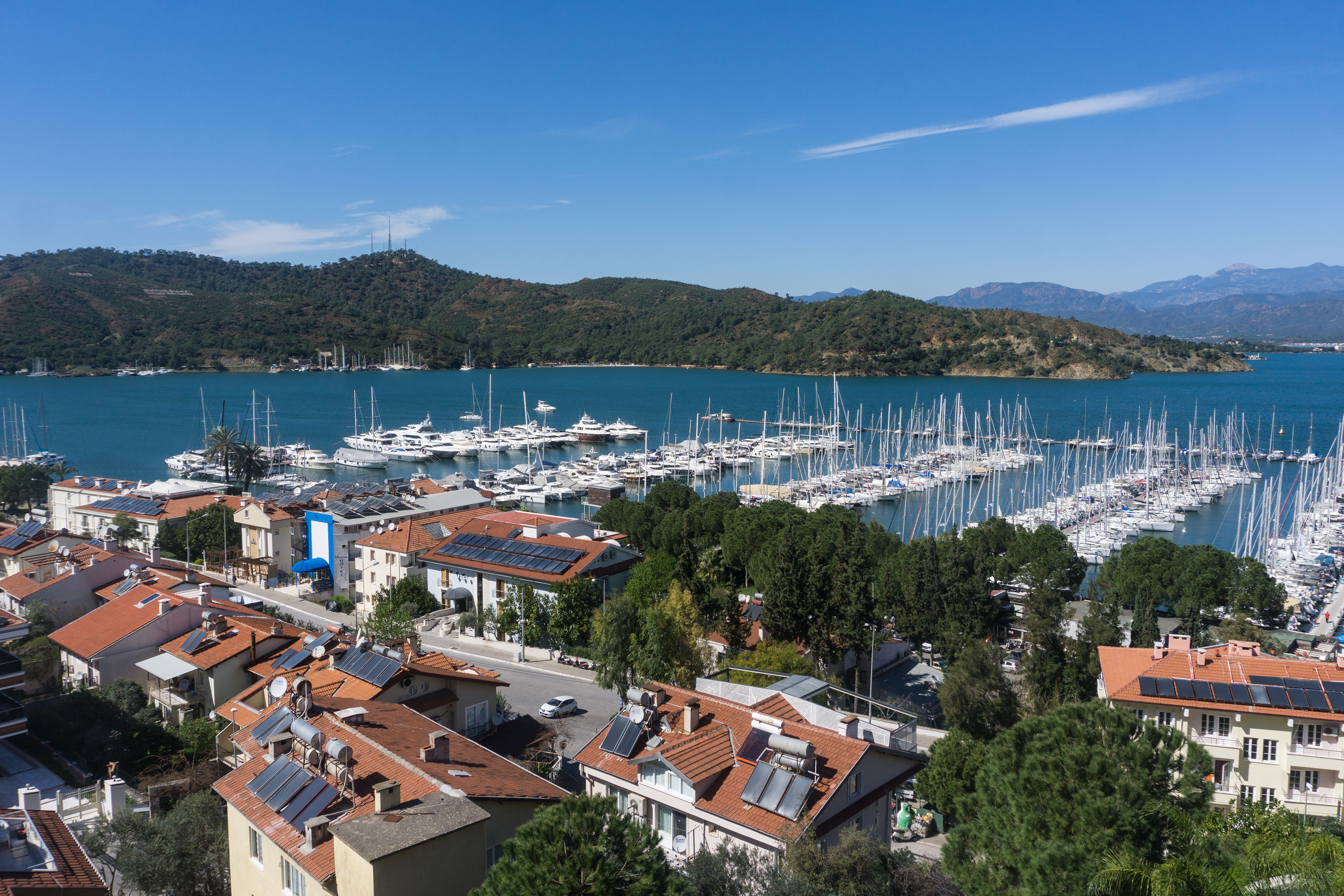
View of the Fethiye coast

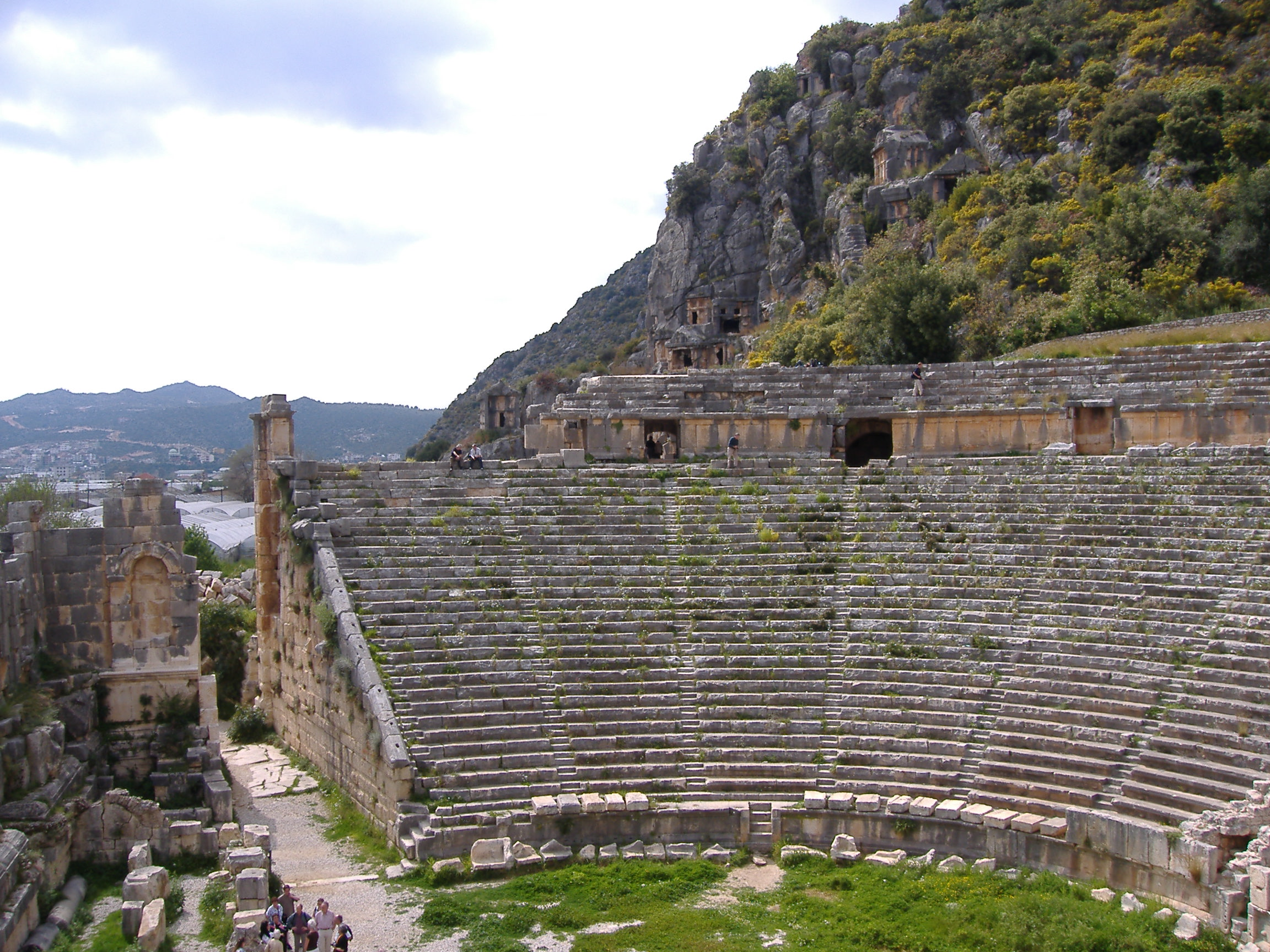
Roman theatre in Myra (Demre) where St. Nicholas lived

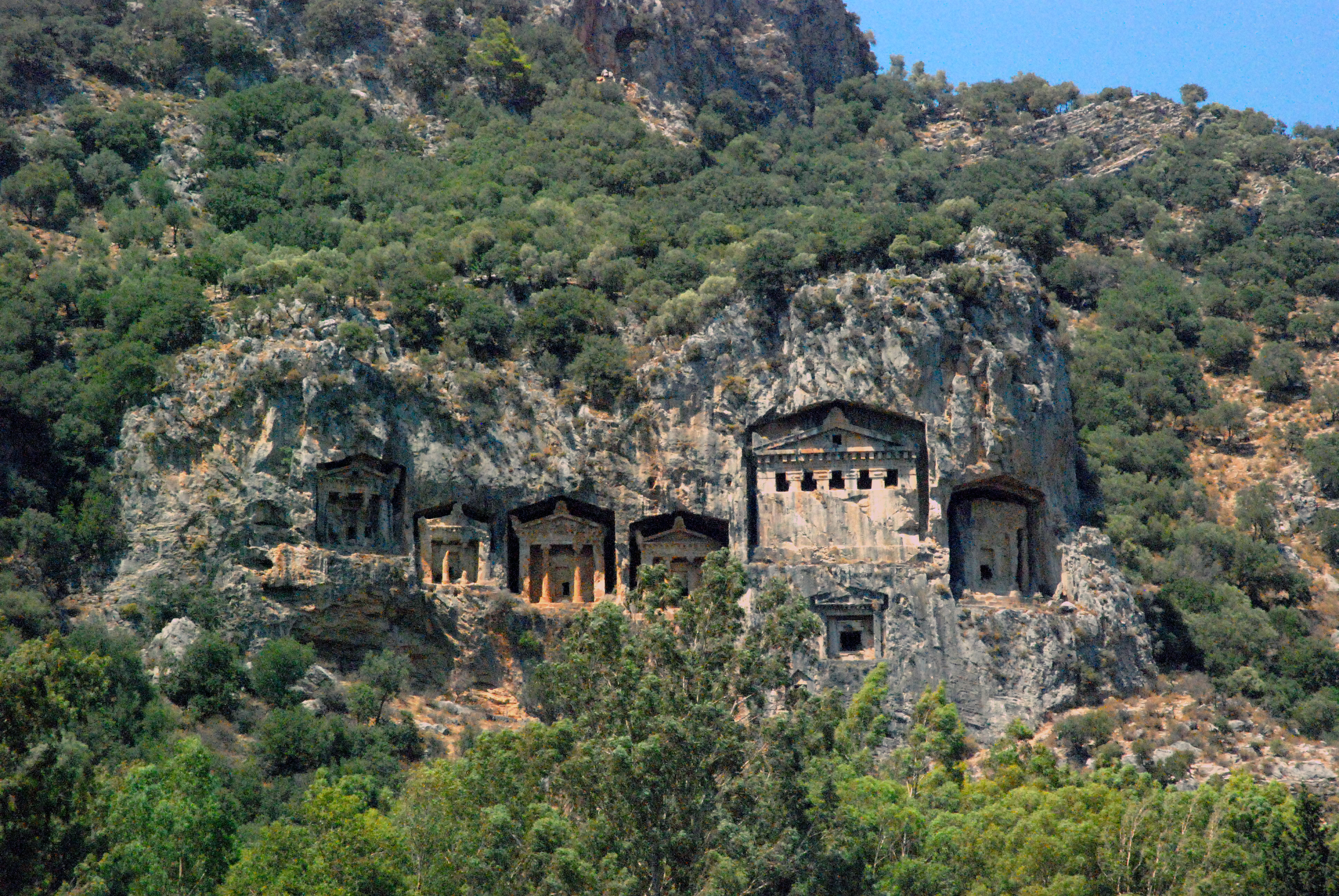
Lycian tombs in Fethiye

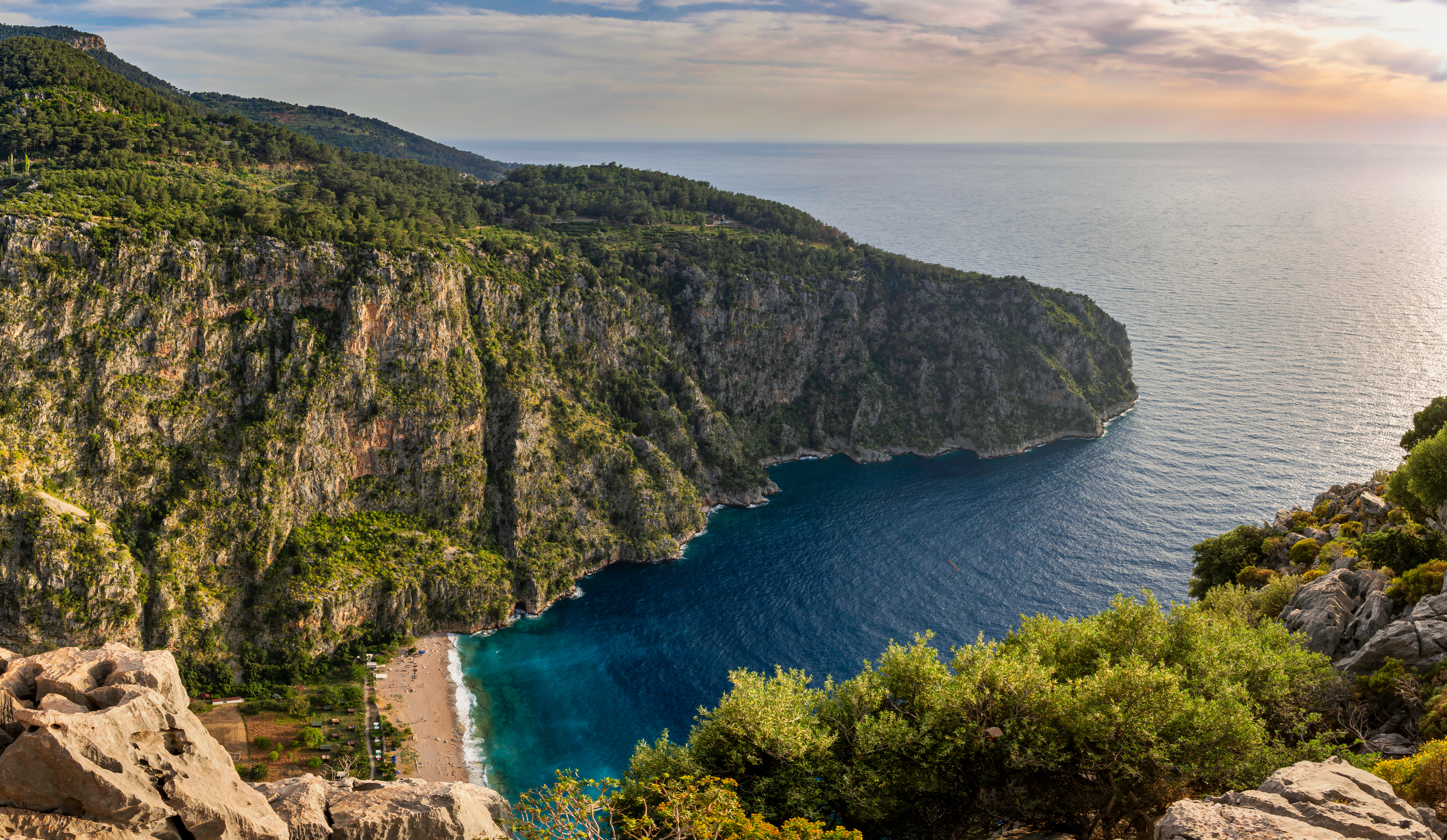
Butterfly Valley, Fethiye

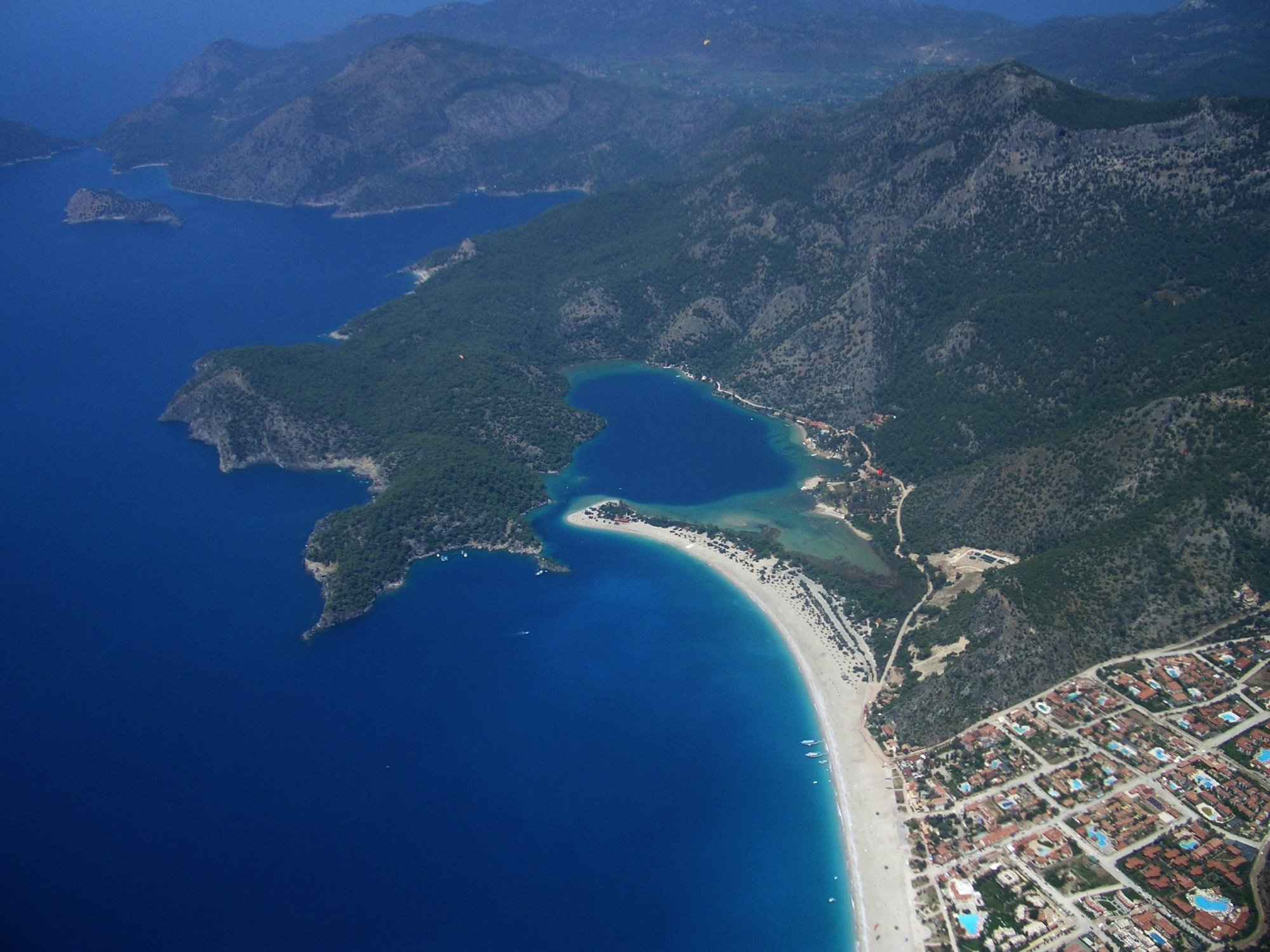
Ölüdeniz Beach, Fethiye

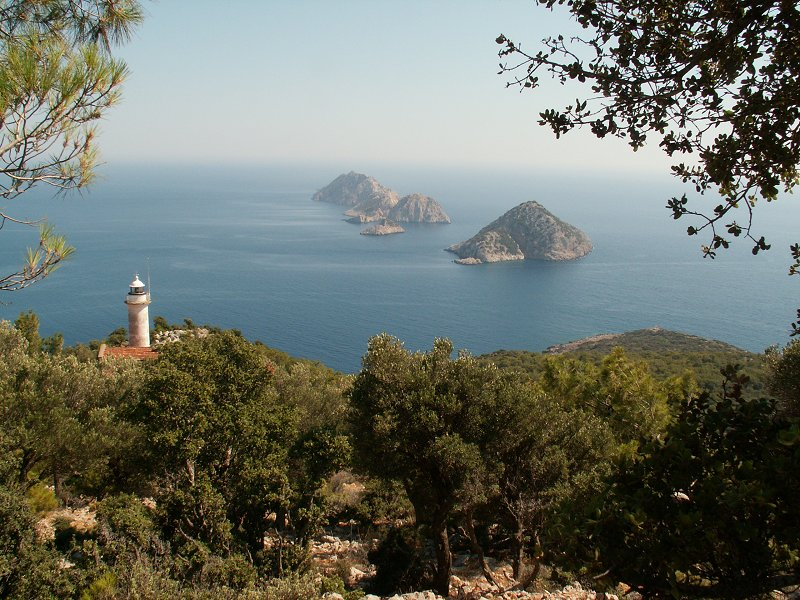
Cape Gelidonya near Finike is the site of the wreck of a Phoenician merchant ship from c. 1200 BC

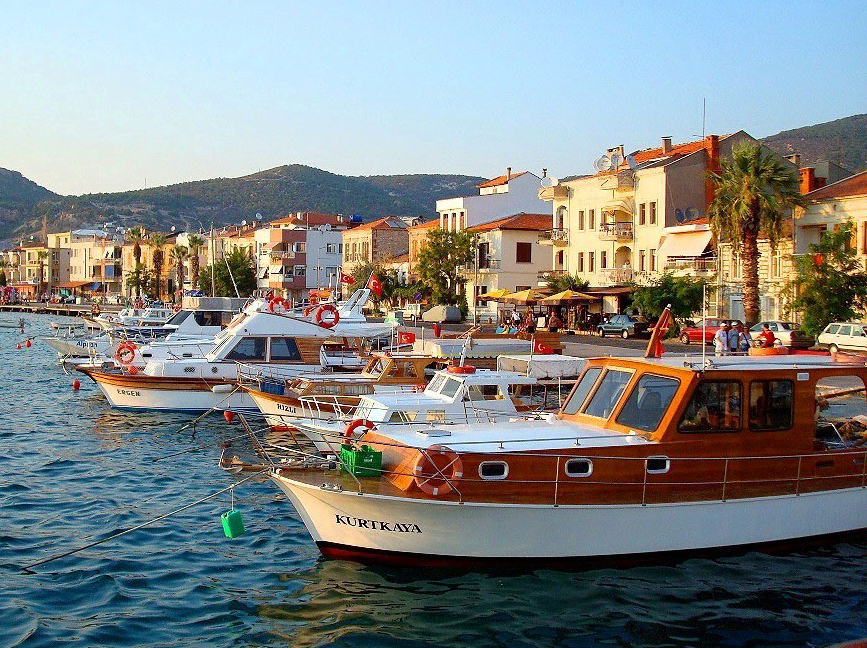
Port of Foça (Phocaea), home of the Mediterranean monk seal

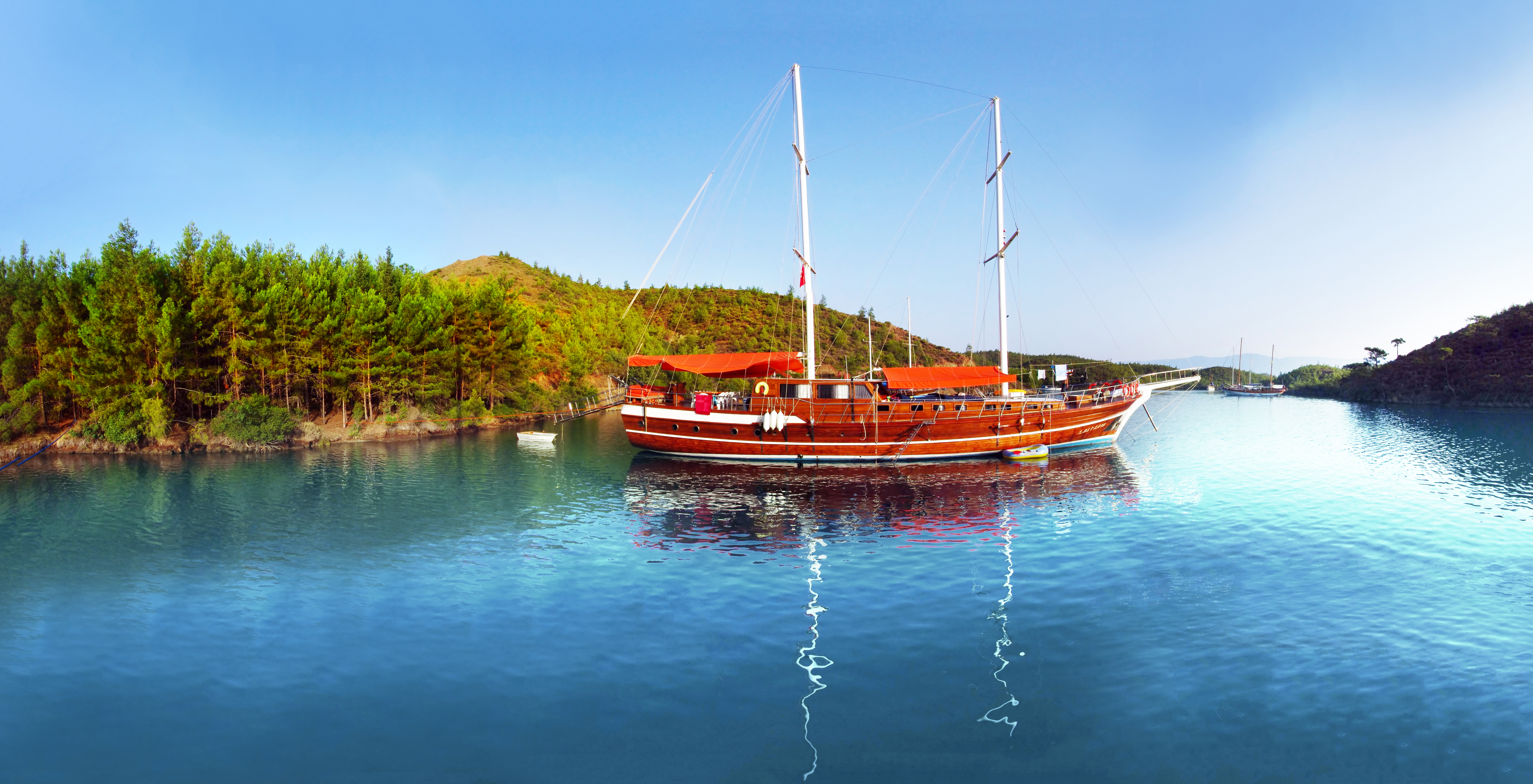
Traditional two-masted gulet visiting a cove in Gökova during a Blue Cruise

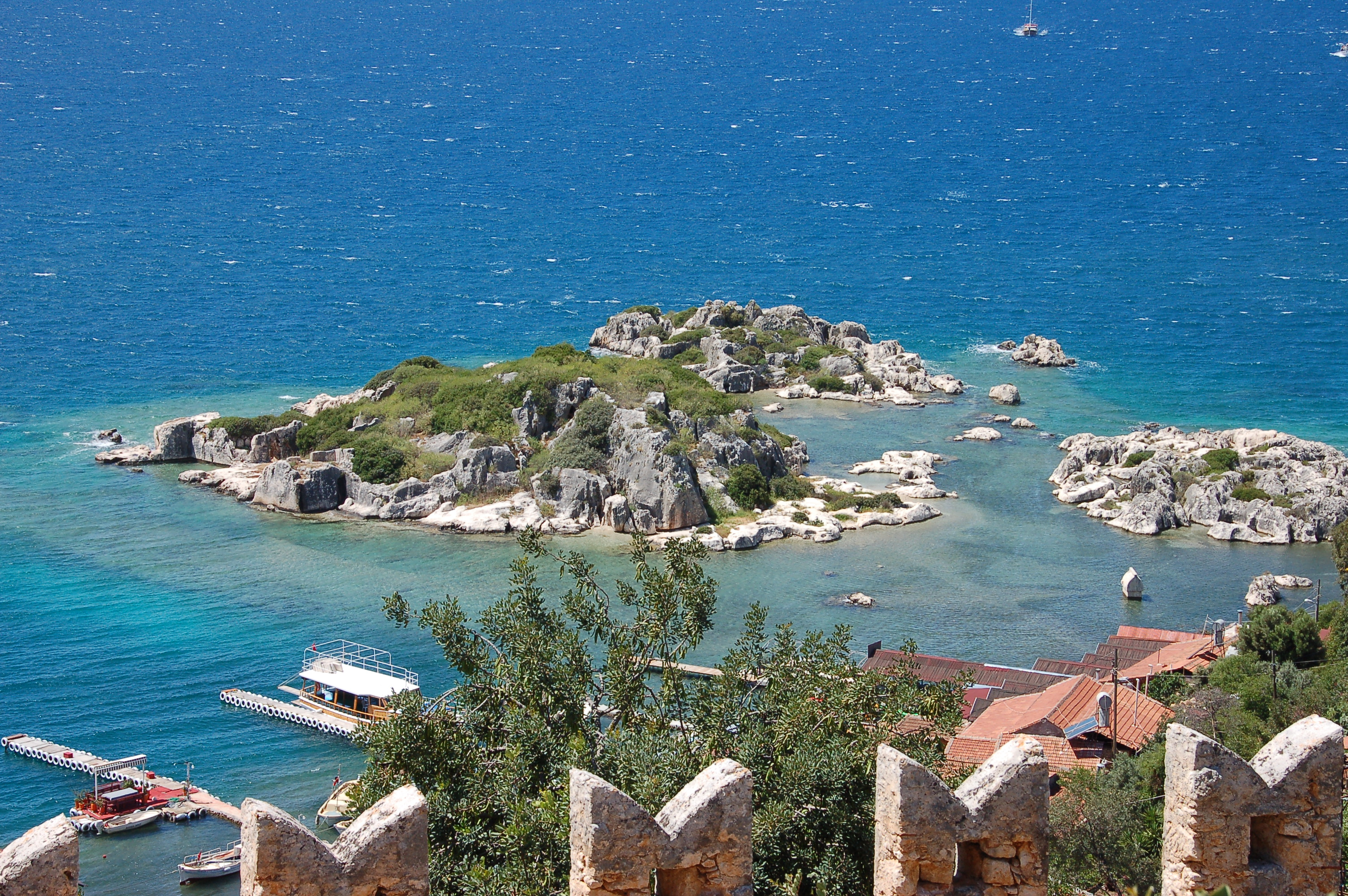
Ancient sites of Simena (Kaleköy)

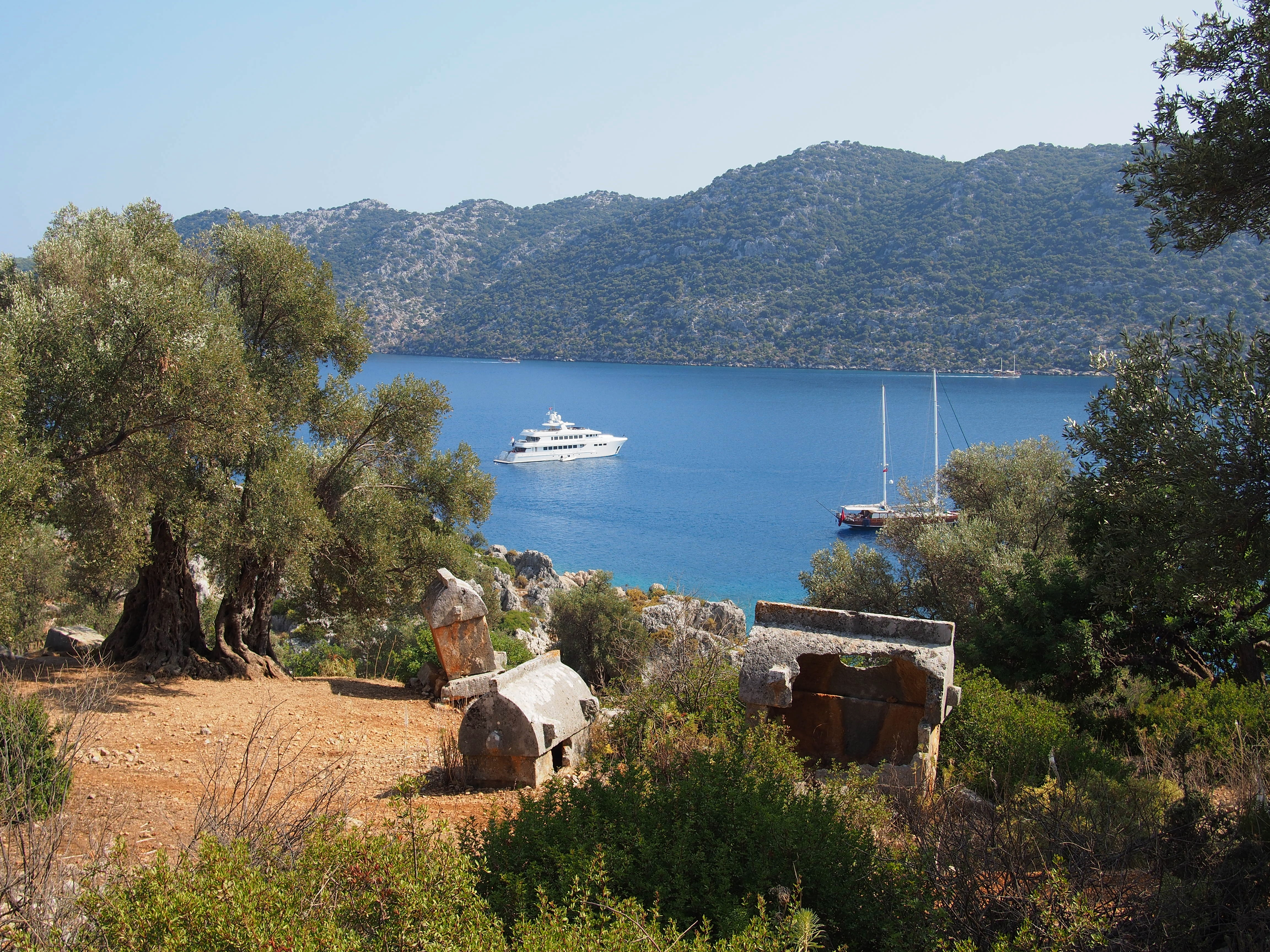
Lycian tombs in Simena

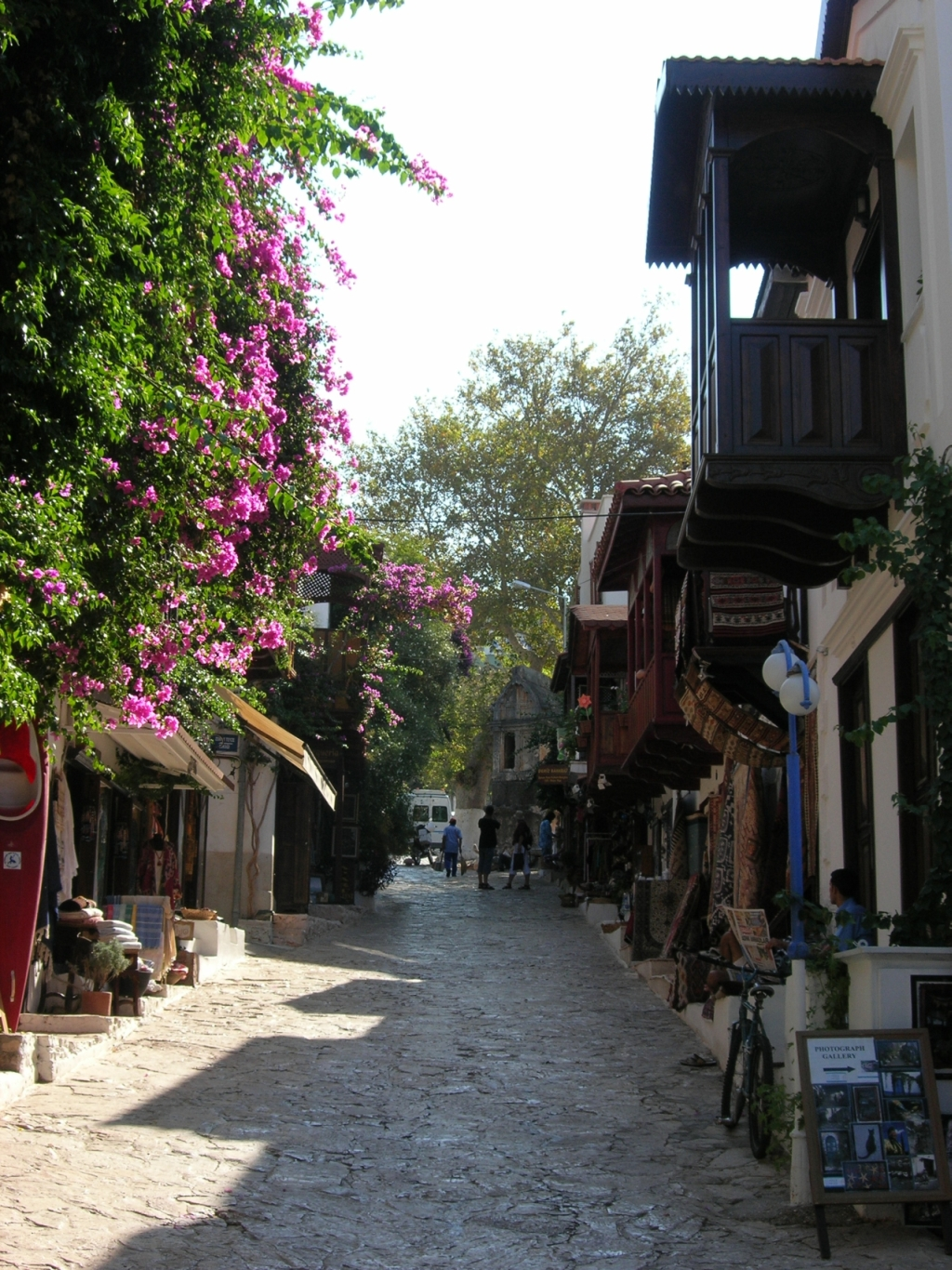
A street in Kaş with traditional houses and a Lycian tomb in the background

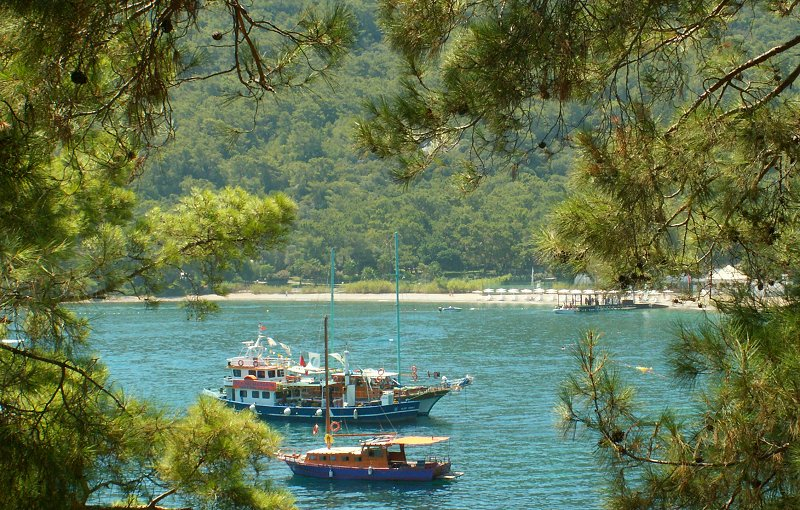
Moonlight Beach in Kemer

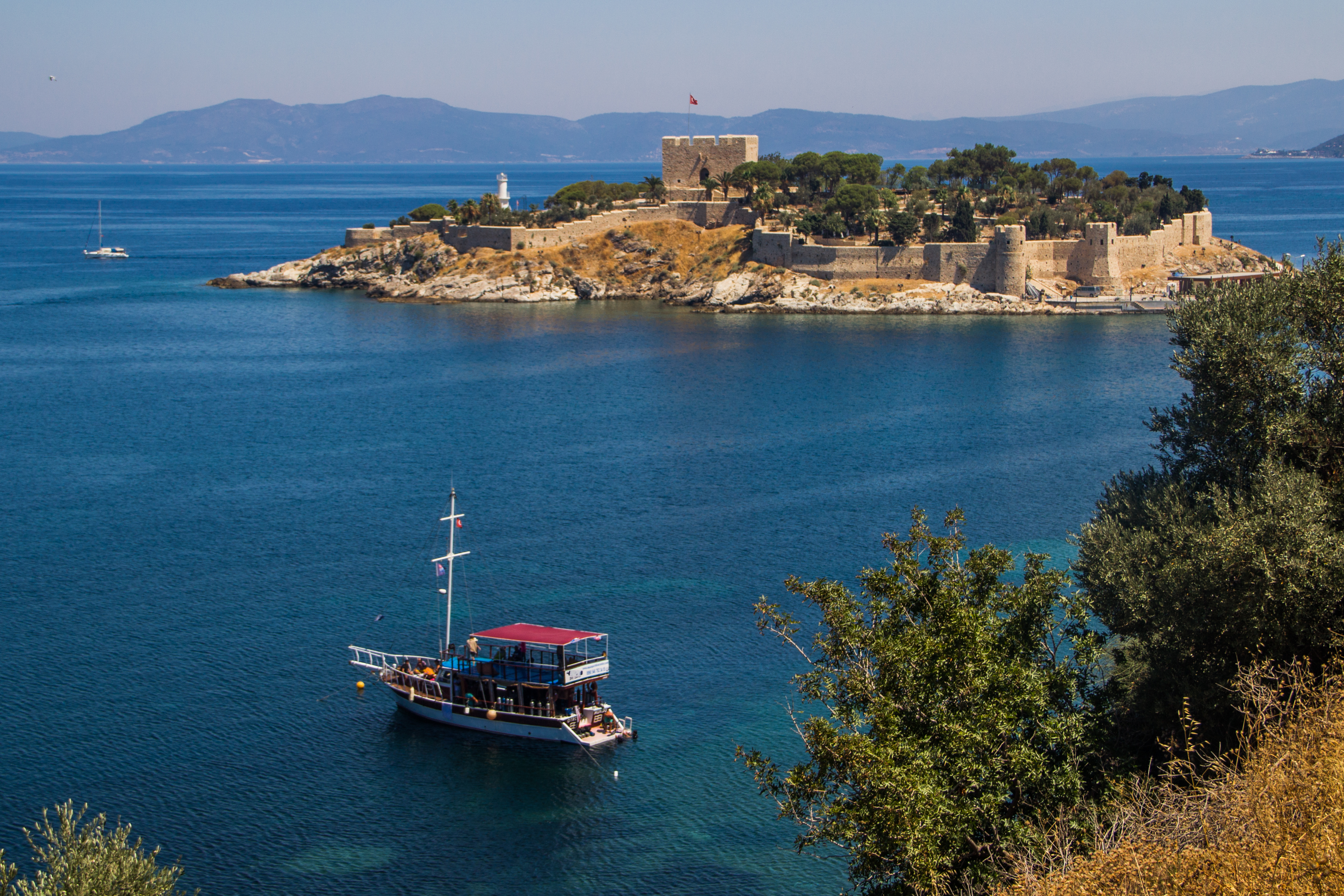
A view of Güvercinada island, Kuşadası

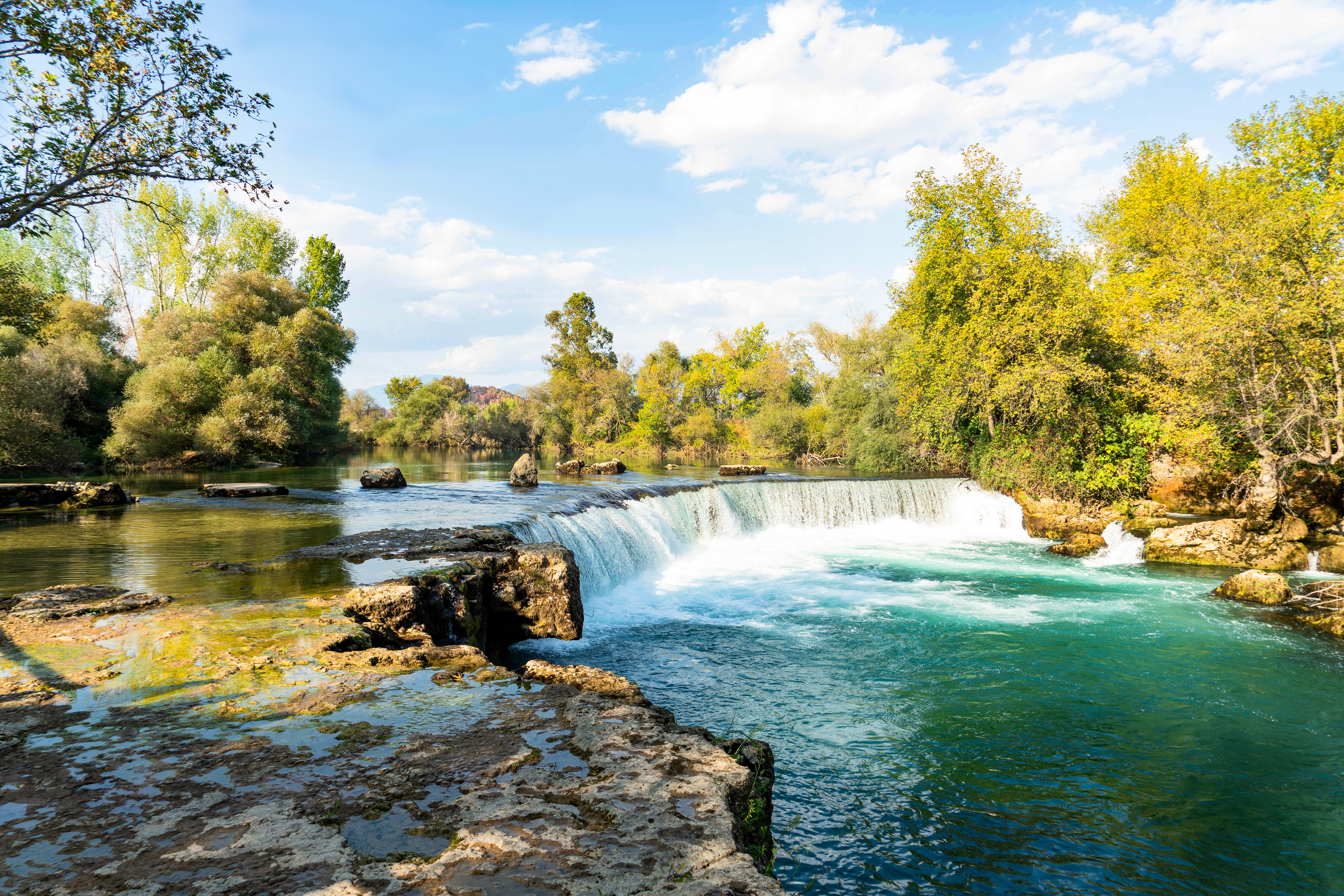
Manavgat waterfall

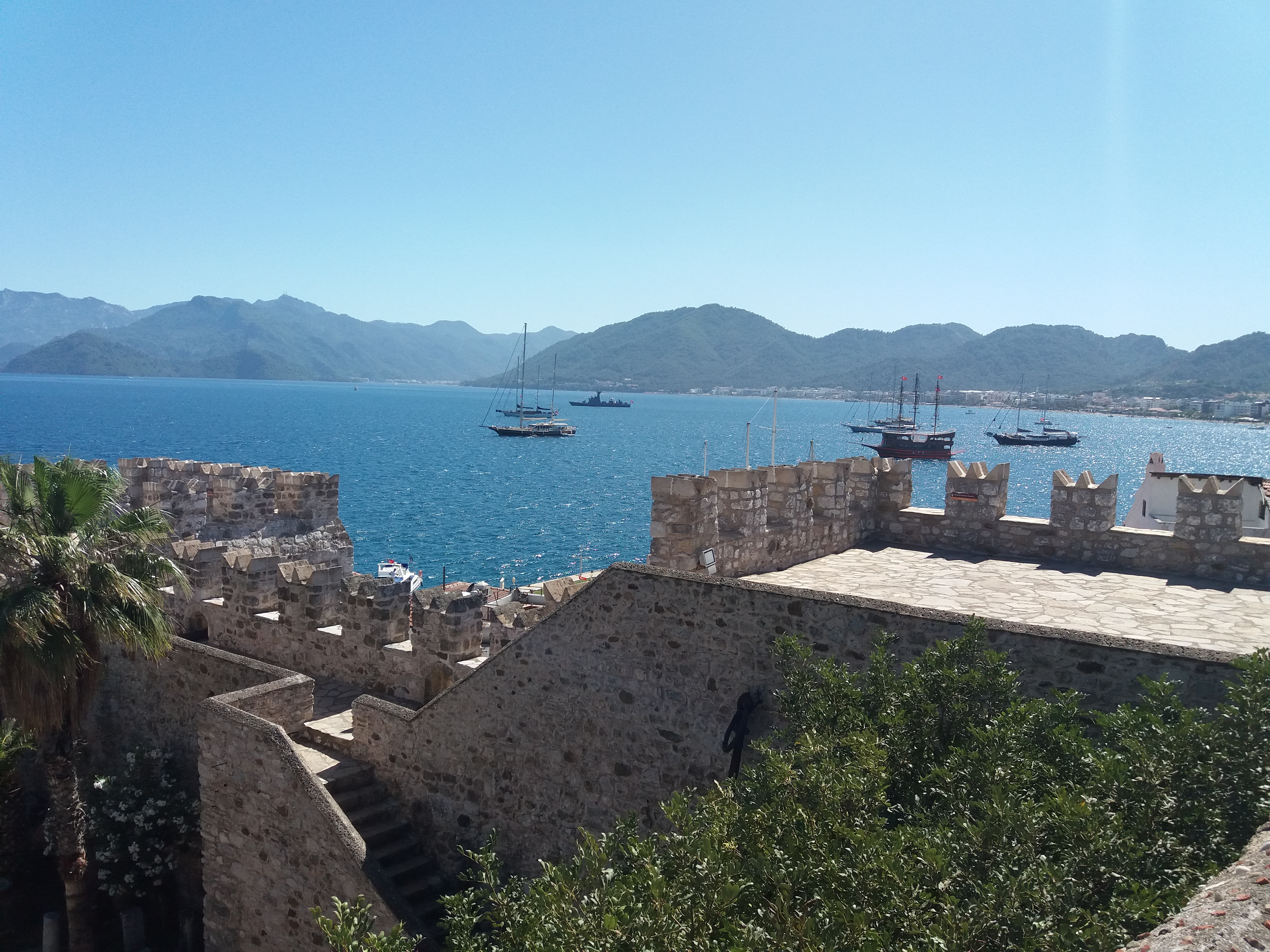
Marmaris Castle, built by Suleiman the Magnificent during his campaign against the Knights of Rhodes

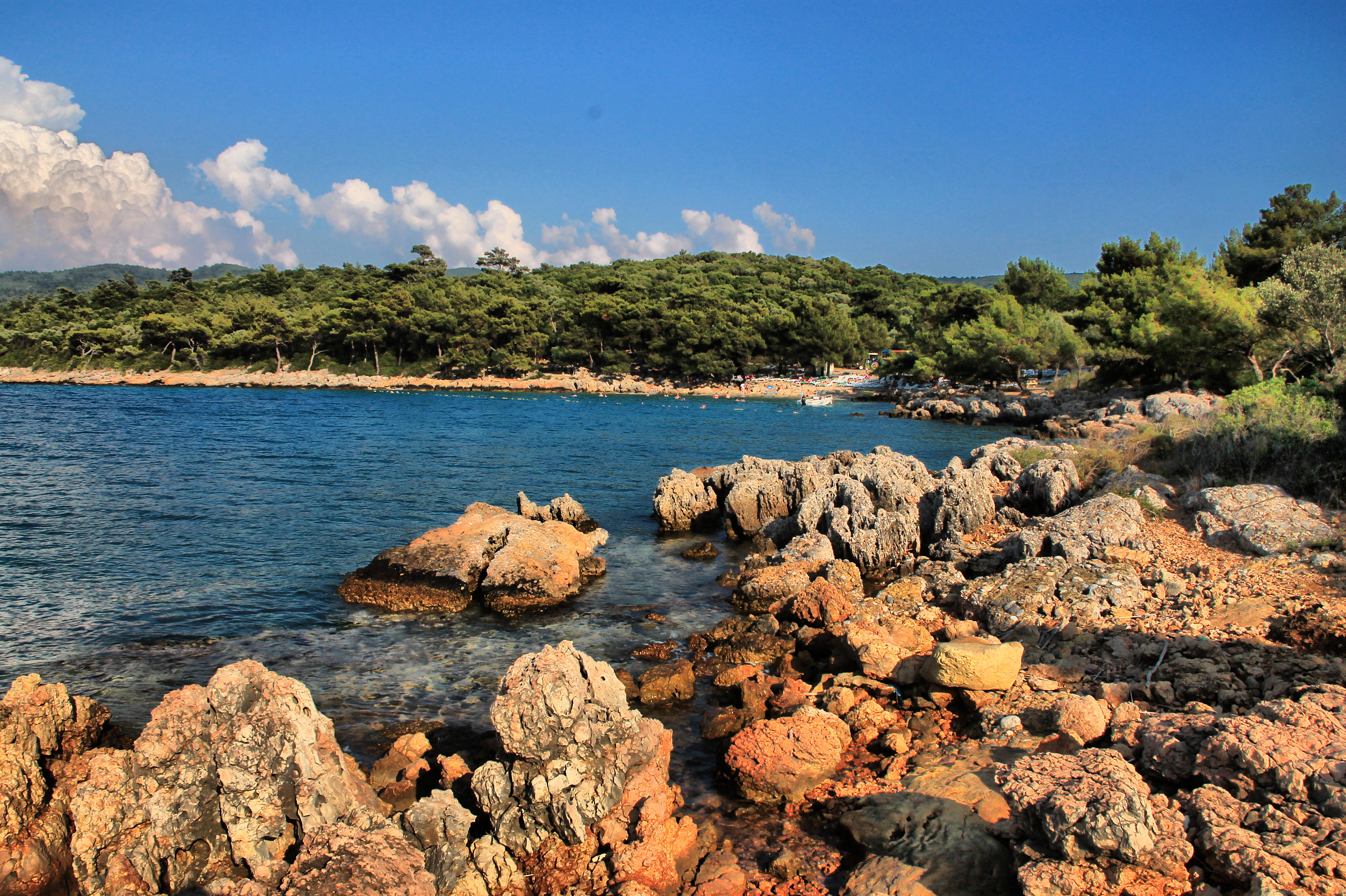
Karaca in Marmaris

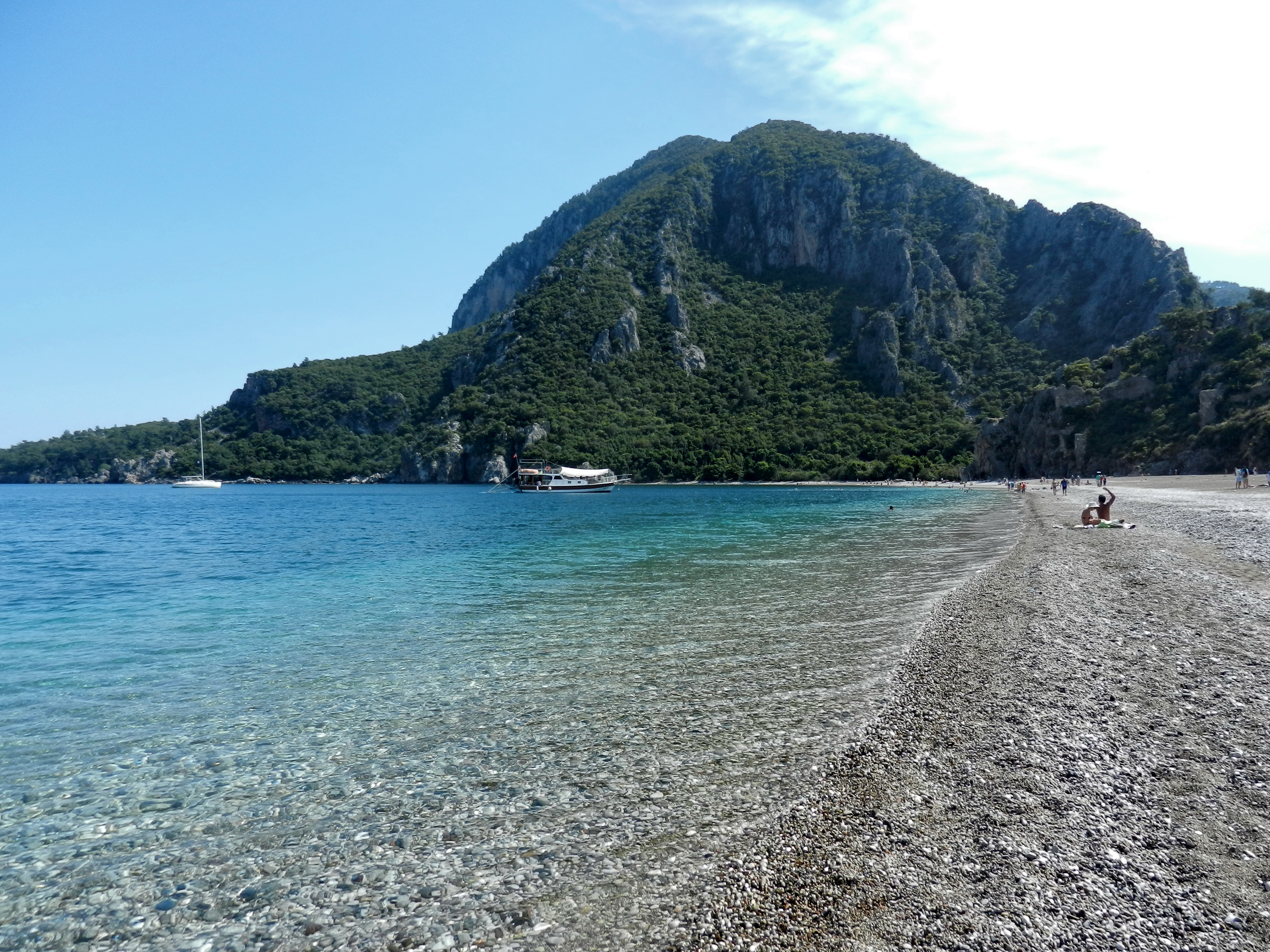
Olympos Beach

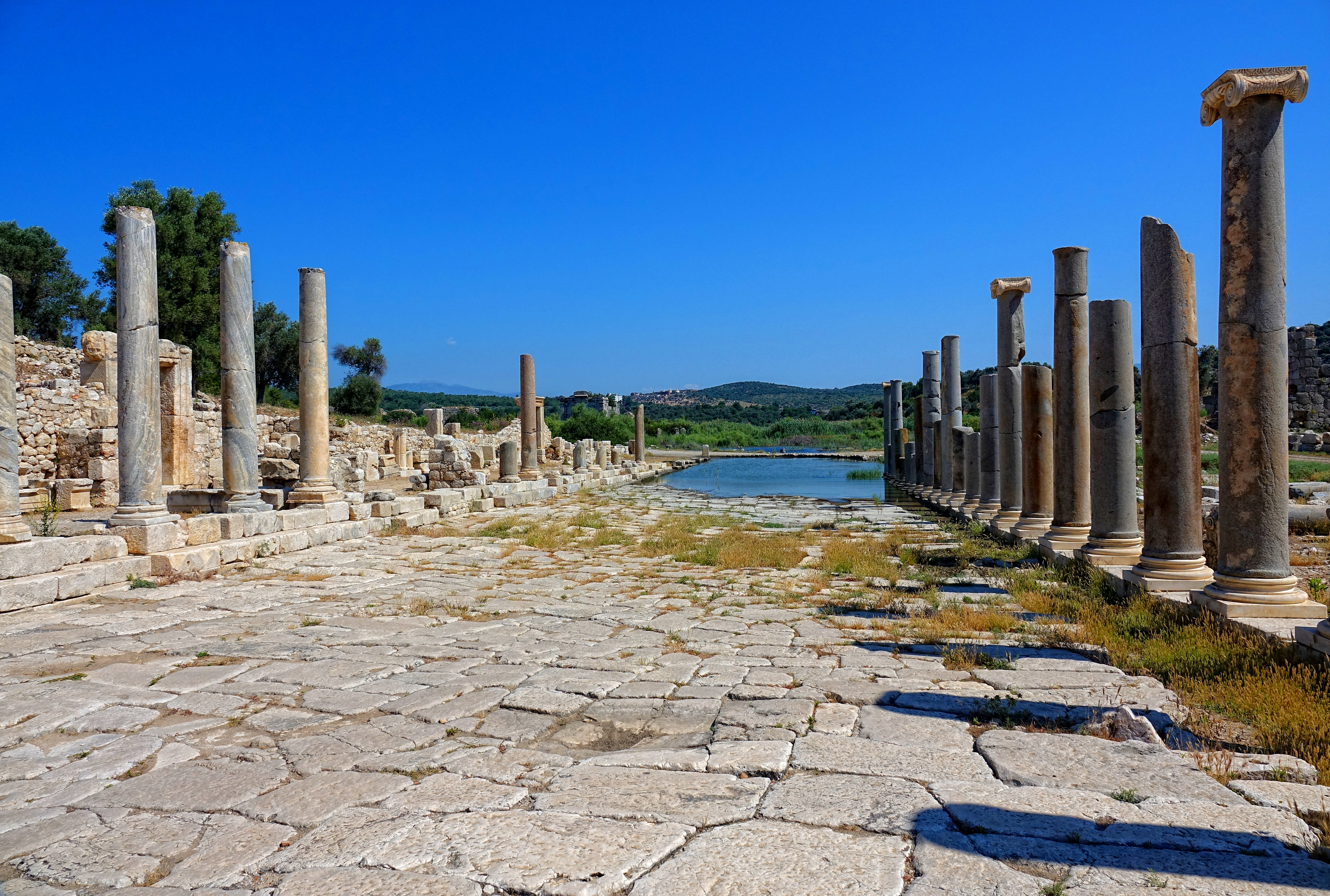
Ancient ruins in Patara

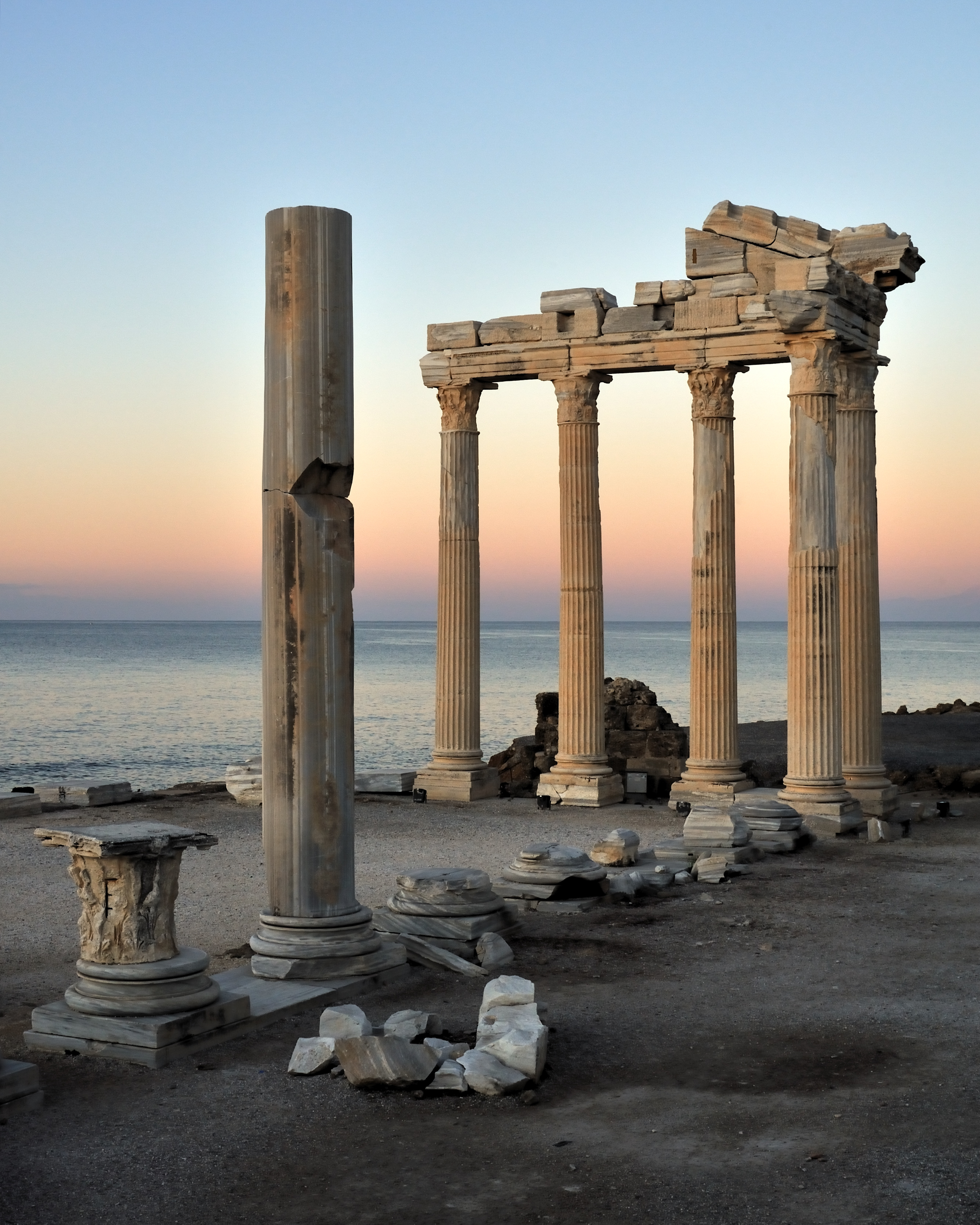
The ruins of the Temple of Apollo, near Side

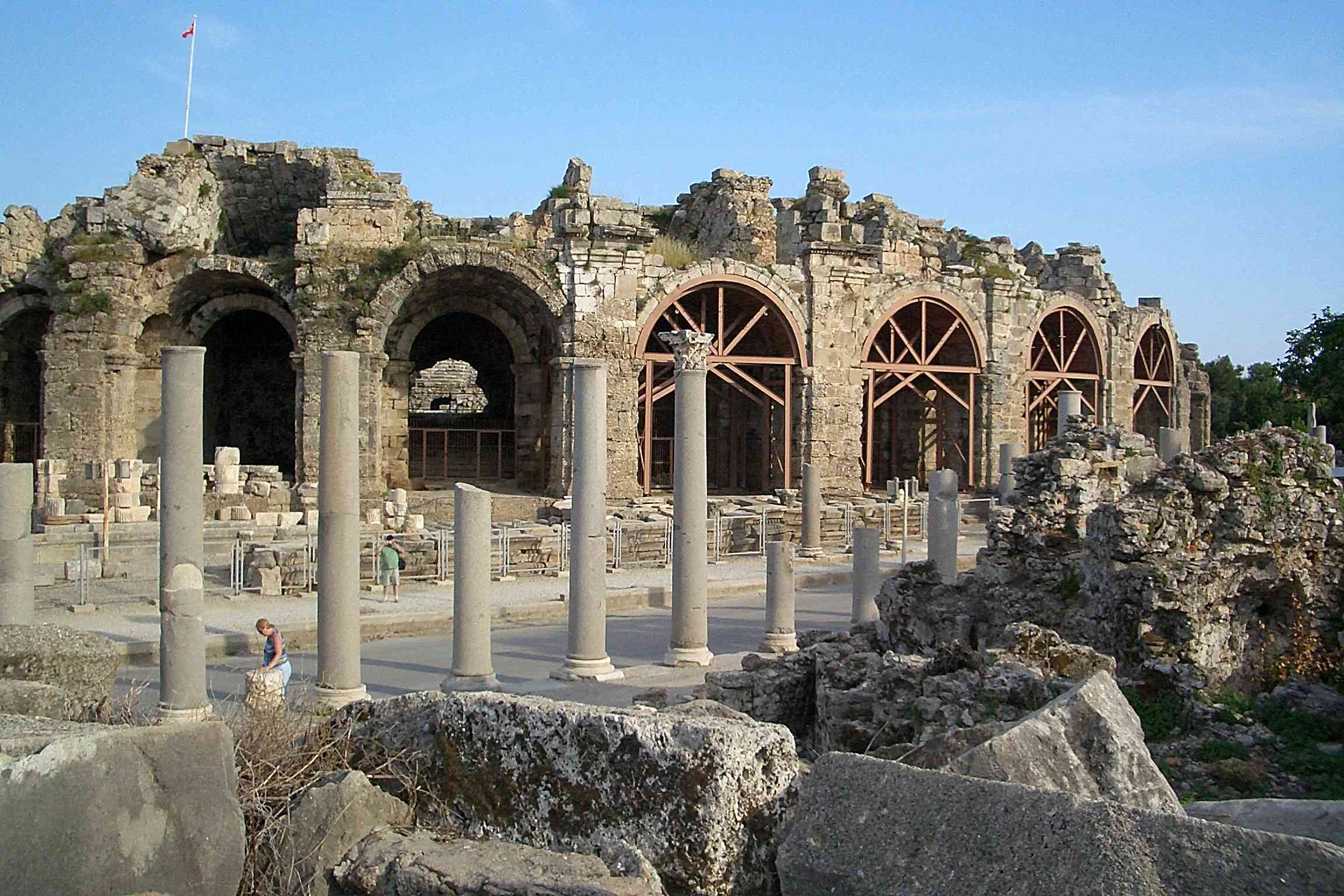
Exterior walls of the ancient theatre in Side

== See also ==
- French Riviera
- Italian Riviera
- Levantine Sea
- The Blue Voyage
- Tourism in Turkey
- Foreign purchases of real estate in Turkey
- Riviera (disambiguation)
