= Kızkumu =

Kızkumu is an area of 600 metre shallow water that divides this bay of Turkey into two and is part of Orhaniye District of the city Muğla in Turkey. According to the legend, a girl who wants to reach her lover fills her skirt with sand and start moving ahead in the sea by filling the sea with her sand. But she was drowned when she ran out of sand. Just at the beginning point of the shallow water area, there is a sculpture of this girl.

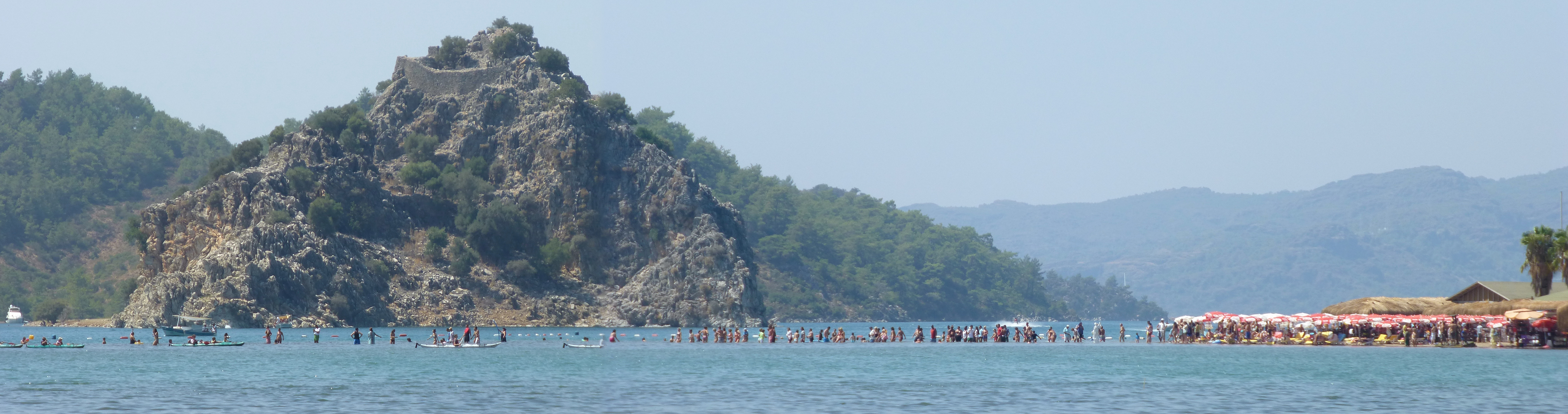
Kızkumu
