= Antalya Province =

Province of Turkey

Antalya Province Antalya ili
- Province and metropolitan municipality
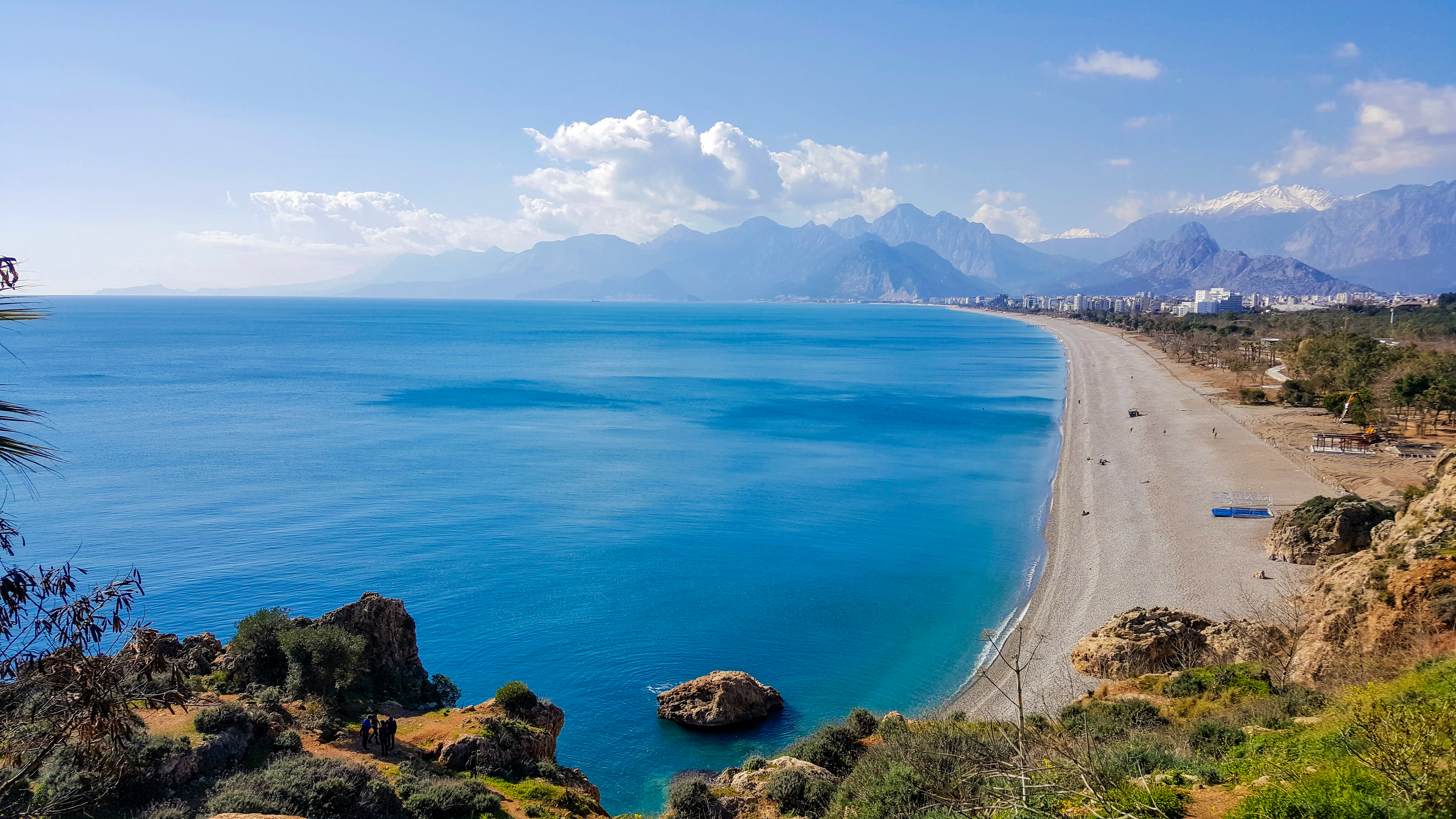
- Konyaaltı Beach in Antalya

- Location of the province within Turkey
- Country: Turkey
- Seat: Antalya

Government
  - Mayor: Büşra Özdemir (AKP)
  - Vali: Hulusi Şahin
- Area: 20,177 km^{2} (7,790 sq mi)
- Highest elevation: 3,086 m (10,125 ft)
- Lowest elevation: 0 m (0 ft)
- Population (2022): 2,688,004
  - Density: 133.22/km^{2} (345.04/sq mi)
- Time zone: UTC+3 (TRT)
- Postal code: 07010 to 07995
- Area code: (+90) 242
- Vehicle registration: 07
- Website: www.antalya.bel.tr www.antalya.gov.tr

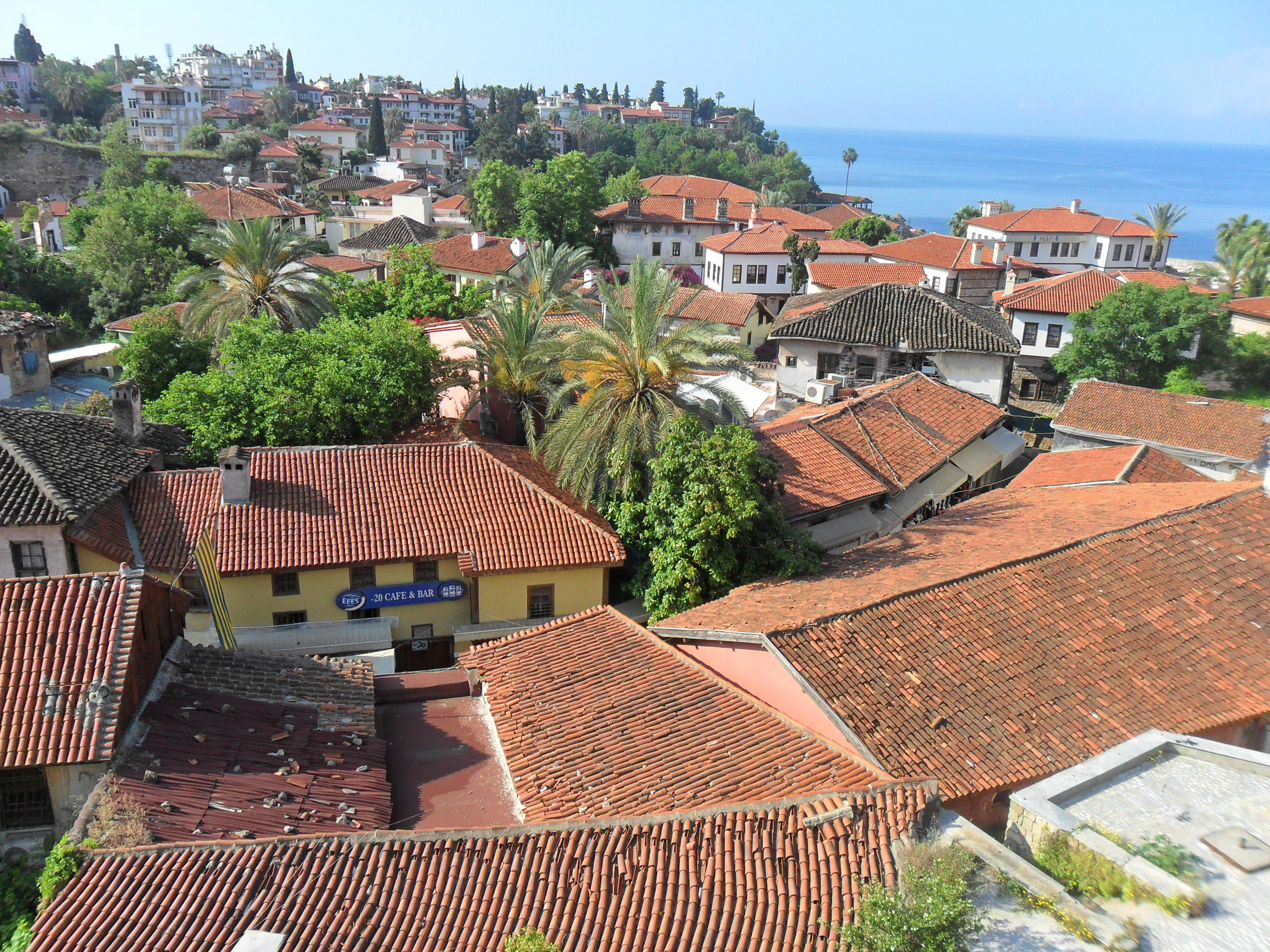
Antalya is the capital of the province.

Antalya Province (Turkish: Antalya ili) is a province and metropolitan municipality of Turkey. It is located on the Mediterranean coast of south-west Turkey, between the Taurus Mountains and the Mediterranean Sea. Its area is 20,177 km^{2}, and its population is 2,688,004 (2022).

Antalya Province is the centre of Turkey's tourism industry, attracting 30% of foreign tourists visiting Turkey. Its capital city of the same name was the world's third most visited city by number of international arrivals in 2011, displacing New York. Antalya is Turkey's biggest international sea resort. The province of Antalya corresponds to the lands of ancient Lycia to the west, Pamphylia to the east, and part of Pisidia to the north. It features a shoreline of 657 km (408 mi) with beaches, ports, and ancient cities scattered throughout, including the World Heritage Site Xanthos. The provincial capital is Antalya city with a population of 1,344,000.

Antalya is the fastest-growing province in Turkey; with a 4.17% yearly population growth rate between years 1990–2000, compared with the national rate of 1.83%. This growth is due to a fast rate of urbanization, particularly driven by tourism and other service sectors on the coast.

== Etymology ==
The city and thus the province are named after Attalos II, king of Pergamon, who founded the city in the 2nd century BC.

== History ==
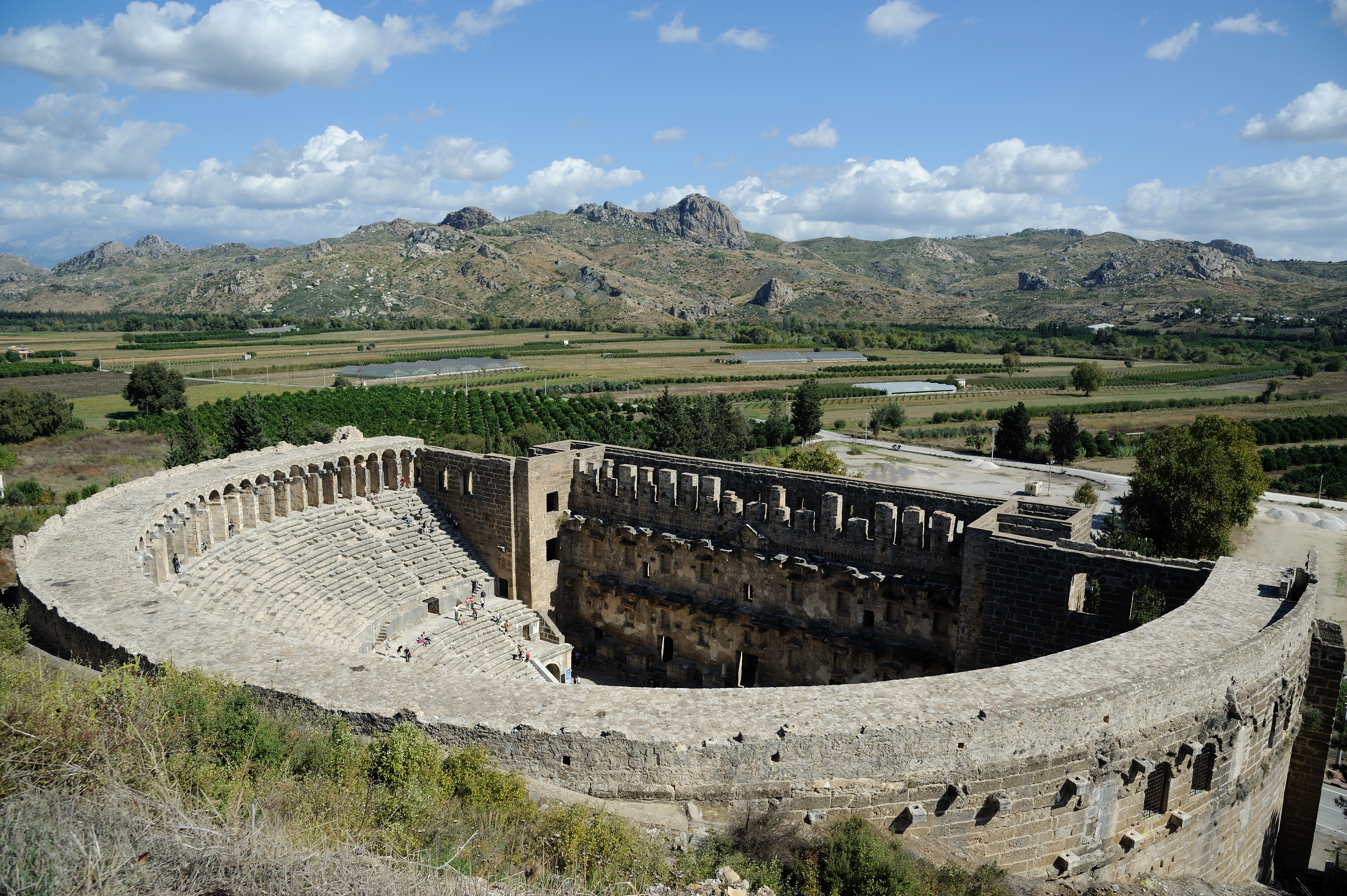
Aspendos Theatre

=== Antiquity ===
Antalya has been settled since pre-historic times. Evidence of human habitation dating back to the early Paleolithic age (150,000–º200,000 years ago) has been discovered in the Karain cave, 30 km (19 mi) of the north of Antalya city. Other finds dating back to the Mesolithic (Beldibi Cave), Neolithic (Bademağacı Höyüğü) and more recent periods show that the area has been populated by various civilizations throughout the ages.

According to Herodotus, the earliest known inhabitants were a Bronze Age people called the Milyae (Milyans), who referred to the area as Milyas and spoke an Indo-European language known as Milyan. A people called the Termilae, from Crete, also settled and eventually dominated the coastal margins, which were known as Trm̃mis (while the Milyae became concentrated in the mountains). According to Greek legend, an exiled Athenian called Lykos (Latin: Lycus) became prominent in the region. Records from the Hittite period refer to the inhabitas and the area as Lukka, and document lively interactions with neighboring regions in the 2nd millennium BC. It is commonly accepted that Lukka is cognate with the later, Latinised exonym Lycia. The Lukka were known for their seafaring skills (including piracy) and demonstrated a fiery, independent spirit; neither the Hittites, nor the Arzawa, to the west, could ever dominate them for long.

According to Greek legend, there was immigration by a Greek tribe called the Akhaioi (from the northern Peloponnese) to the area, after the Trojan War, and eventually many Greek settlements built up along the coast and inland. In the Hellenistic period, the western parts of the later Antalya were regarded as Lycia, whereas the east was Pamphylia, and the extremes east Cilicia, while Pisidia was to the north. These communities grew into independent cities, and eventually a federation was set up, under the name of Pamphylia.

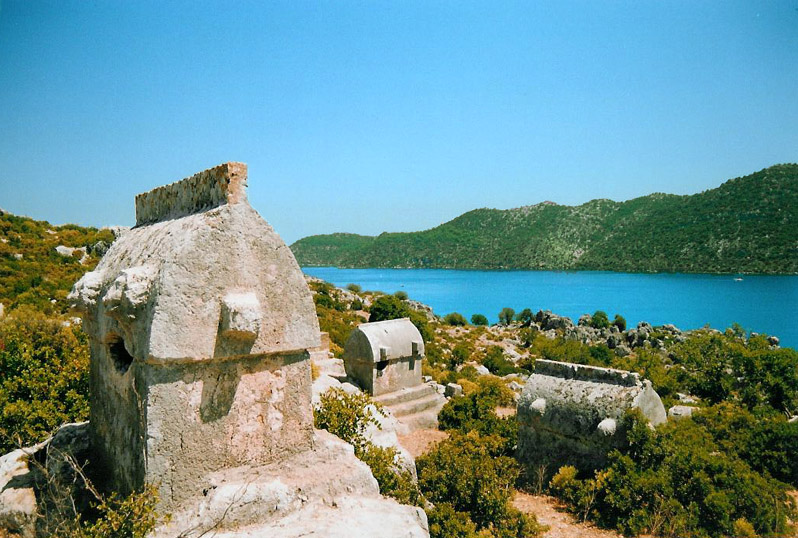
Lycian tombs in Simena

Before the Ancient Roman conquest Lycia was a polity with the first democratic constitution in the world, which later partly inspired the U.S. Constitution.

Antalya was part of the Lydian kingdom from the 7th century BC until Lydia was defeated by the Achaemenid Empire during the Battle of Sardis in 546 BC. The Macedonian commander Alexander the Great ended Persian rule and in around 334 BC conquered the cities of the area one by one—except for Termessos and Sillyon which managed to repulse his armies in 333 BC. After the death of Alexander in 323 BC, a long battle erupted between his generals that lasted until 188 BC.

The reign of the kingdom of Pergamon began with the defeat of the Seleucid army at Apamea. Shortly after this the city of Antalya was founded. When Attalos III, the last king of Pergamom, died in 133 BC he left his kingdom to the Roman Republic. At this time the area is dominated by pirates based in small cities along the coast.

=== The Byzantines ===
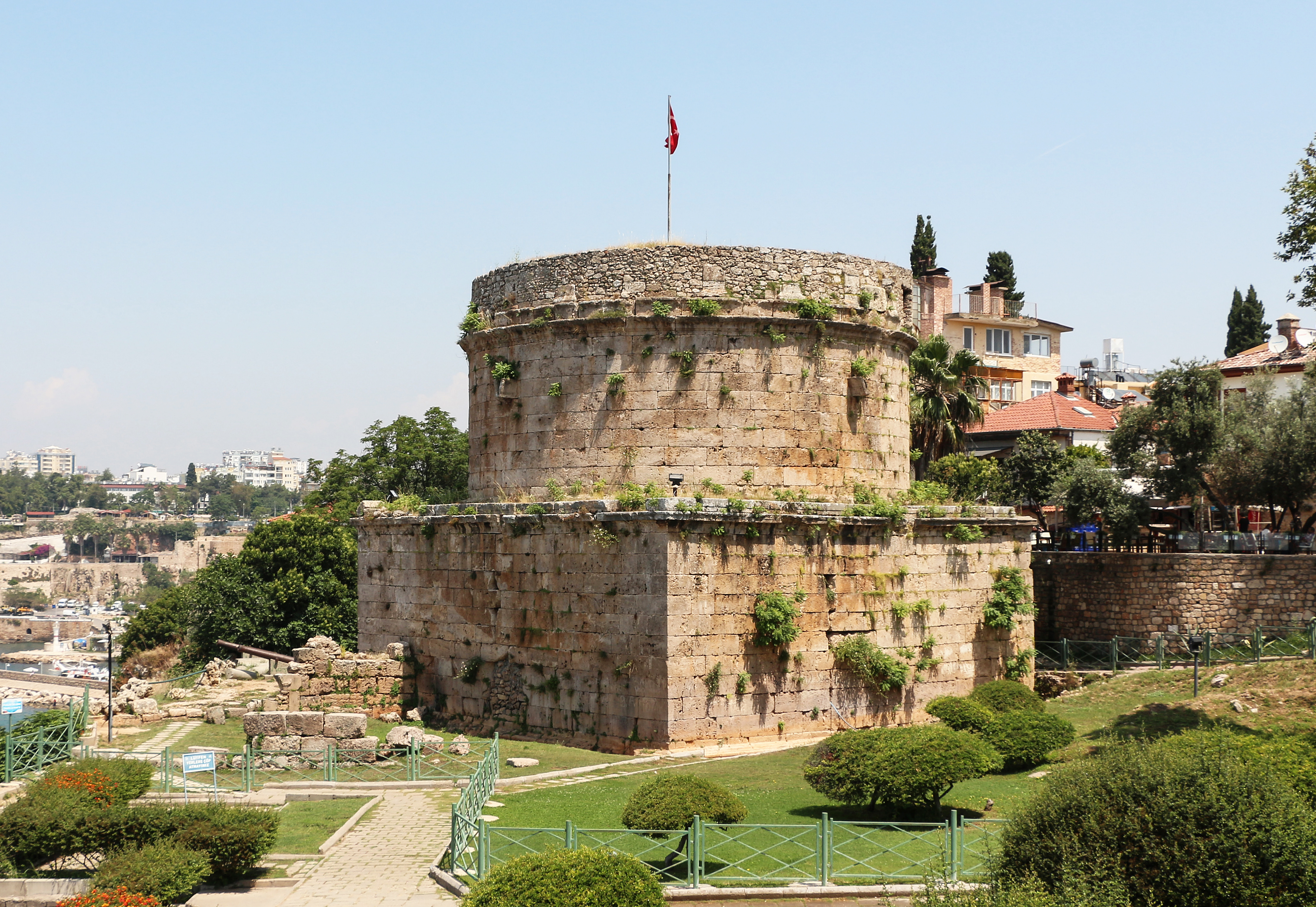
Hıdırlık Tower dating back to the Hellenistic era

During the mid-Byzantine era (the 5th and 6th centuries) the city of Antalya grew beyond the city walls.

From the early Muslim conquests of the 7th century Muslim Arabs started to be dominant in the Levant region and Antalya later played a part in the Christian Crusades against Islam. The army of King Louis VII of France sailed from Antalya for Syria during the Second Crusade in 1148, and the fleet of Richard I of England rallied here before the conquest of Cyprus during the Third Crusade. In the late 11th and early 12th Century much of the area of the modern province fell to the Turks especially the Danishmends. From 1120 to March 1207, Antalya was again under the sovereignty of Byzantines.

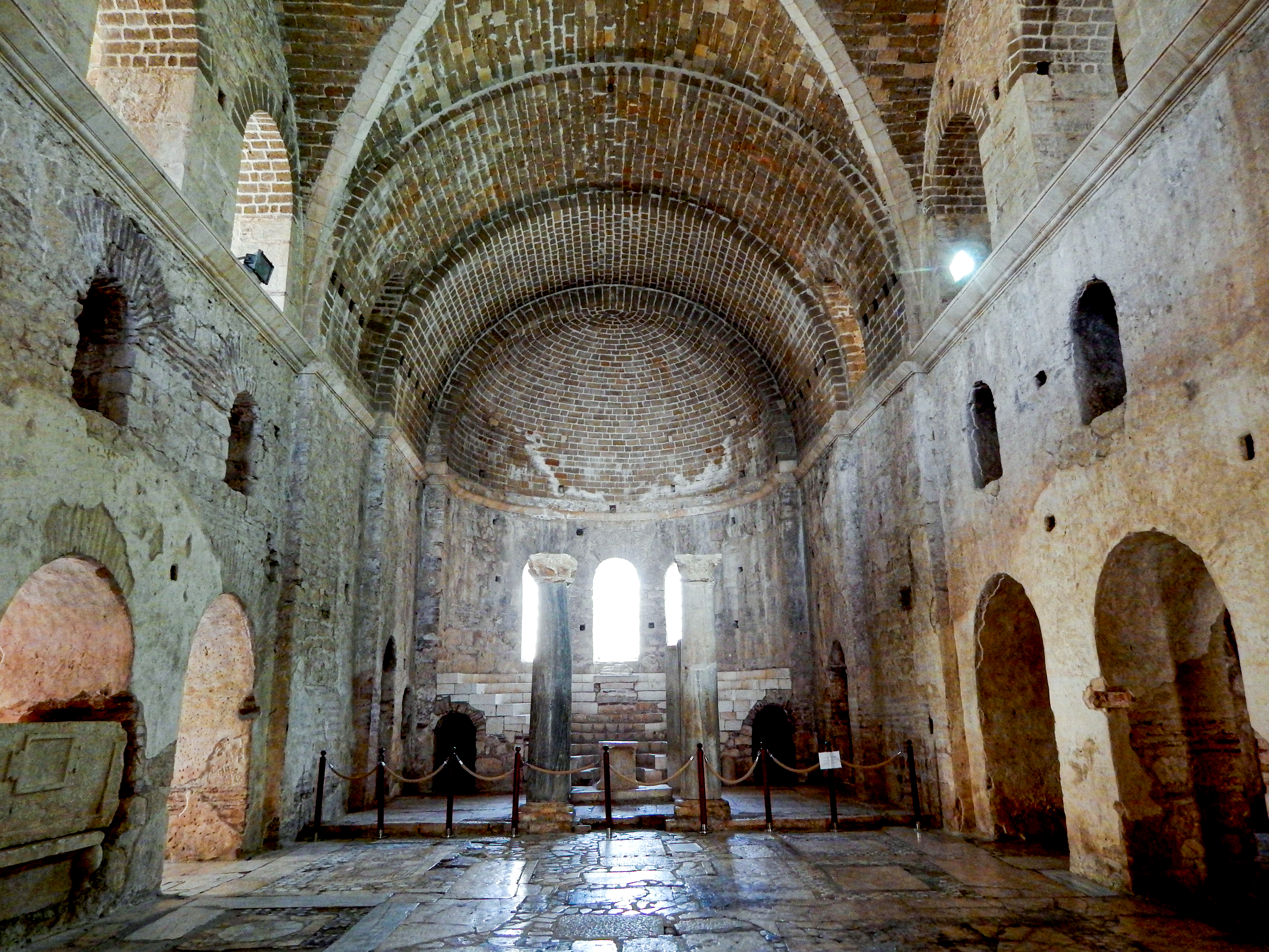
St. Nicholas Church, Demre

=== The Seljuk Turks ===
The area was conquered by the Seljuk Turks and recaptured by the Byzantines again and again from 1076 onwards as the Seljuks strove to establish a trading base on the Mediterranean. At one stage Turkish lord Kilij Arslan had a palace here. In 1220 Byzantine rule ended for the last time and the city was quickly divided into Christian and Muslim sections, the Christian trading communities including Venetians and Genoese. Alanya also grew and throve during the Seljuk period.

=== The Ottoman Empire onwards ===
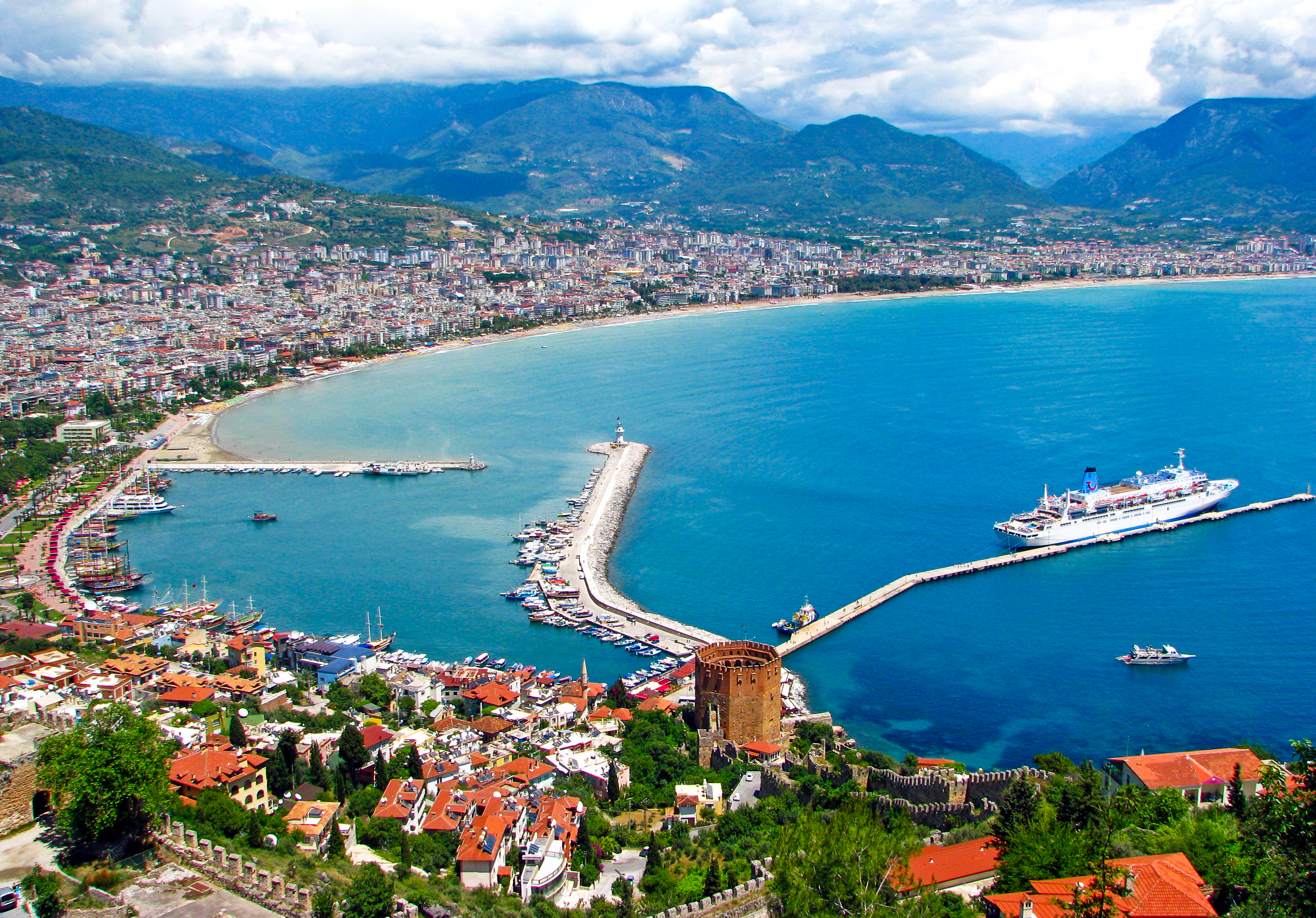
Alanya is located in Antalya province

The area passed through many hands before its final occupation by the Ottoman Empire under Murad II during the Ottoman expansion into Europe in 1432. Antalya was also occupied by Kingdom of Cyprus between 1361 and 1373. Ottoman rule of the coast persisted until the empire's collapse at the end of the First World War. The Kingdom of Italy was guaranteed the province in the Agreement of Saint-Jean-de-Maurienne, although the other members of the Allied Powers disputed the legality of this treaty. Antalya was briefly occupied by the Royal Italian Army before becoming part of the Republic of Turkey during the Turkish War of Independence led by Atatürk in 1921.

There are many archaeological sites in the province including three National Parks and three Specially Protected Areas.

== Geography ==
Köppen map of Antalya Province and surrounding regions:
- BSk
- Csa
- Csb
- Dsa
- Dsb
- Dsc

Antalya province is situated in south-west Anatolia, between the longitudes 29°20'-32°35'East and latitudes 36°07'-37°29'North. The province covers an area of 20,591 square miles. The southern border of the province is the Mediterranean Sea while the Taurus Mountains draw the land border. From west to east the province is bordered by Muğla, Burdur, Isparta, Konya, Karaman and Mersin provinces. The land of the province is 77.8% mountainous, 10.2% plain and 12% uneven. Many of the peaks of the Taurus mountains are above 500–3000 metres. The Teke Peninsula (corresponds to ancient Lycia) in the west includes wide plateaus and river basins. Climate, agriculture, demographics and habitation patterns differ greatly between the inland mountain areas and the coastal plain.

The Antalya basin consists of three sub-basins: the Manavgat in the east, the Köprü Çay in the middle, and the Aksu in the west.

The western part of the Antalya plain is crossed by two rivers: the Karaman Çay, west of the city, and the Düden Çay, east of the city. A wide undersea canyon extends to the south of the area where these rivers flow into the Antalya Gulf. Offshore from the Aksu's mouth, there is no canyon; there is instead a shallow marine shelf where the river deposits sediments in a broad area.

West of the Aksu basin is a 30x40 km-wide area of tufa and travertine deposits that mark the SW boundary of the basin; the city of Antalya is built on top of this area. These deposits were formed from prehistoric cold springs in the early Pleistocene. They are deepest at the west end, where they are 250 m deep; they get shallower towards the east and are 30 m deep at the easternmost part.

A narrow band of limestone deposits stretch from Gebiz in the north to the Küçük Asar Tepe hills in the south. This is known as the Gebiz limestone and was likely deposited from shallow coral reefs on the east side of the Aksu basin. There are abundant gastropod and bivalve fossils in these deposits.

Geography of Antalya Province

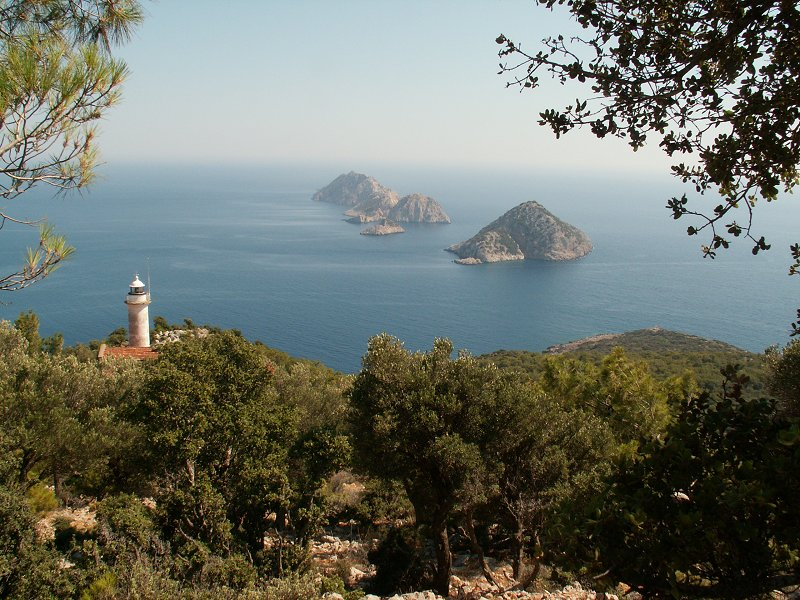
Cape Gelidonya near Finike, the site of the wreck of a Phoenician merchant ship from about 1200 BC

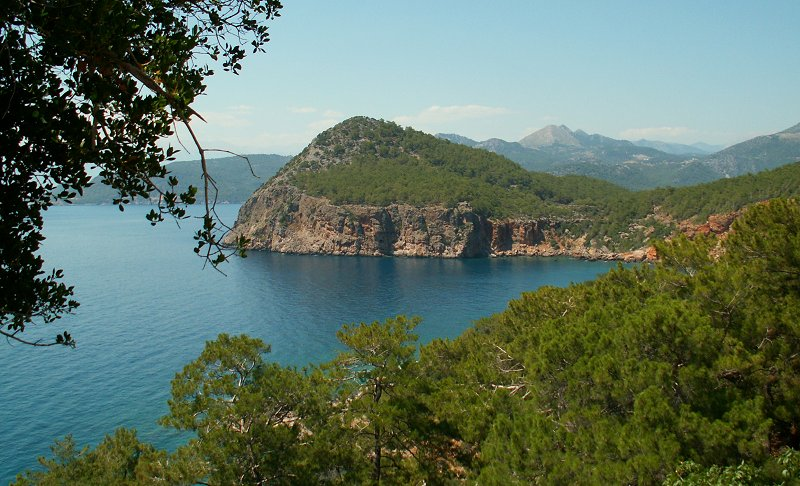
Korsan Koyu Peninsula, an example of typical geography of western Antalya

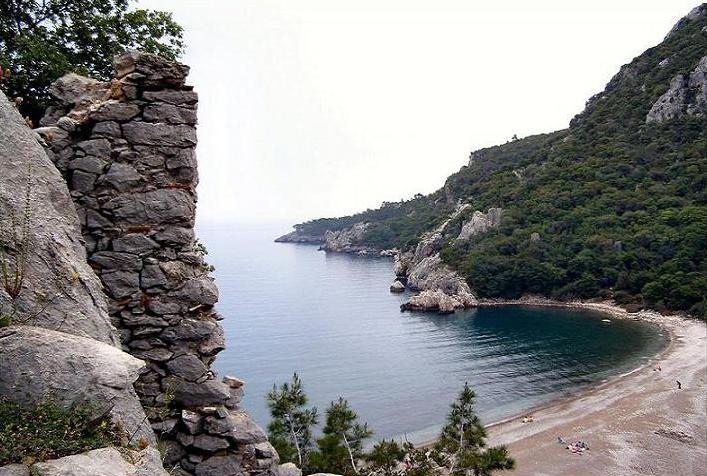
Olympos beach

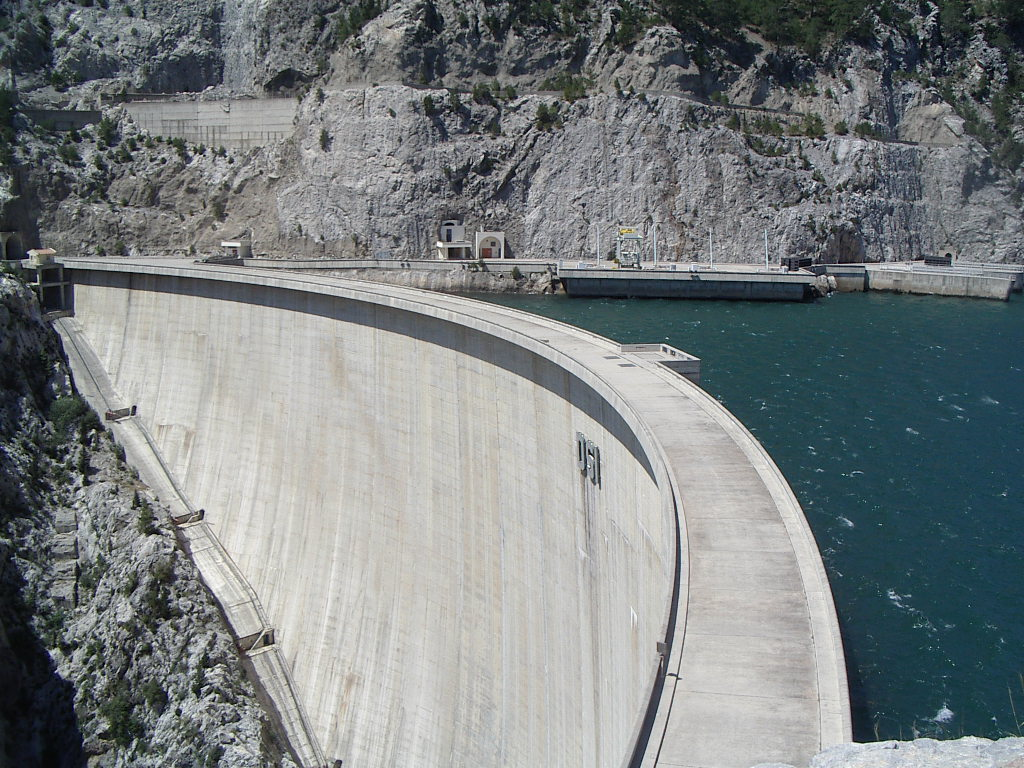
Oymapinar Dam on the Manavgat River

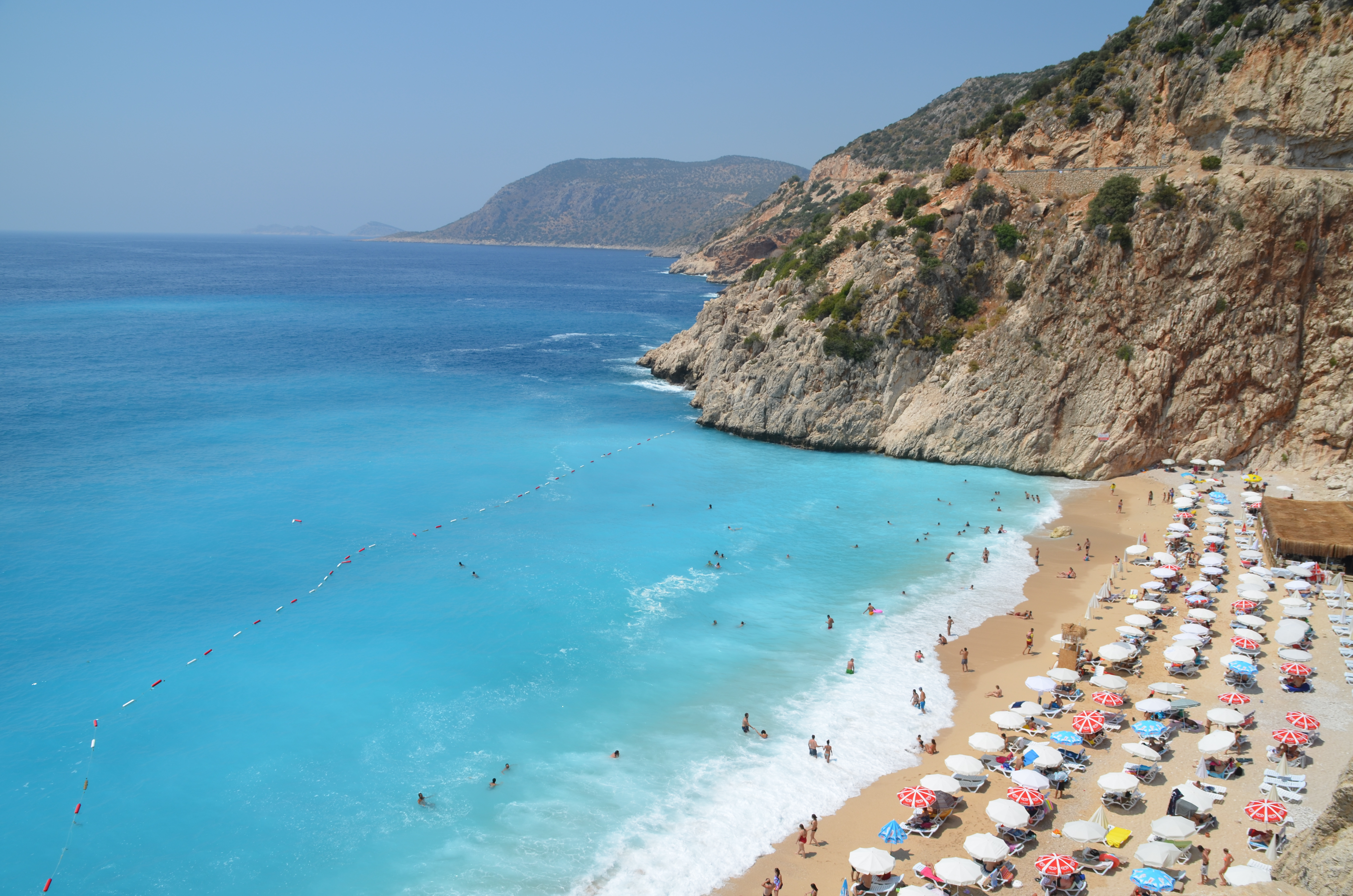
Kaputaş Beach

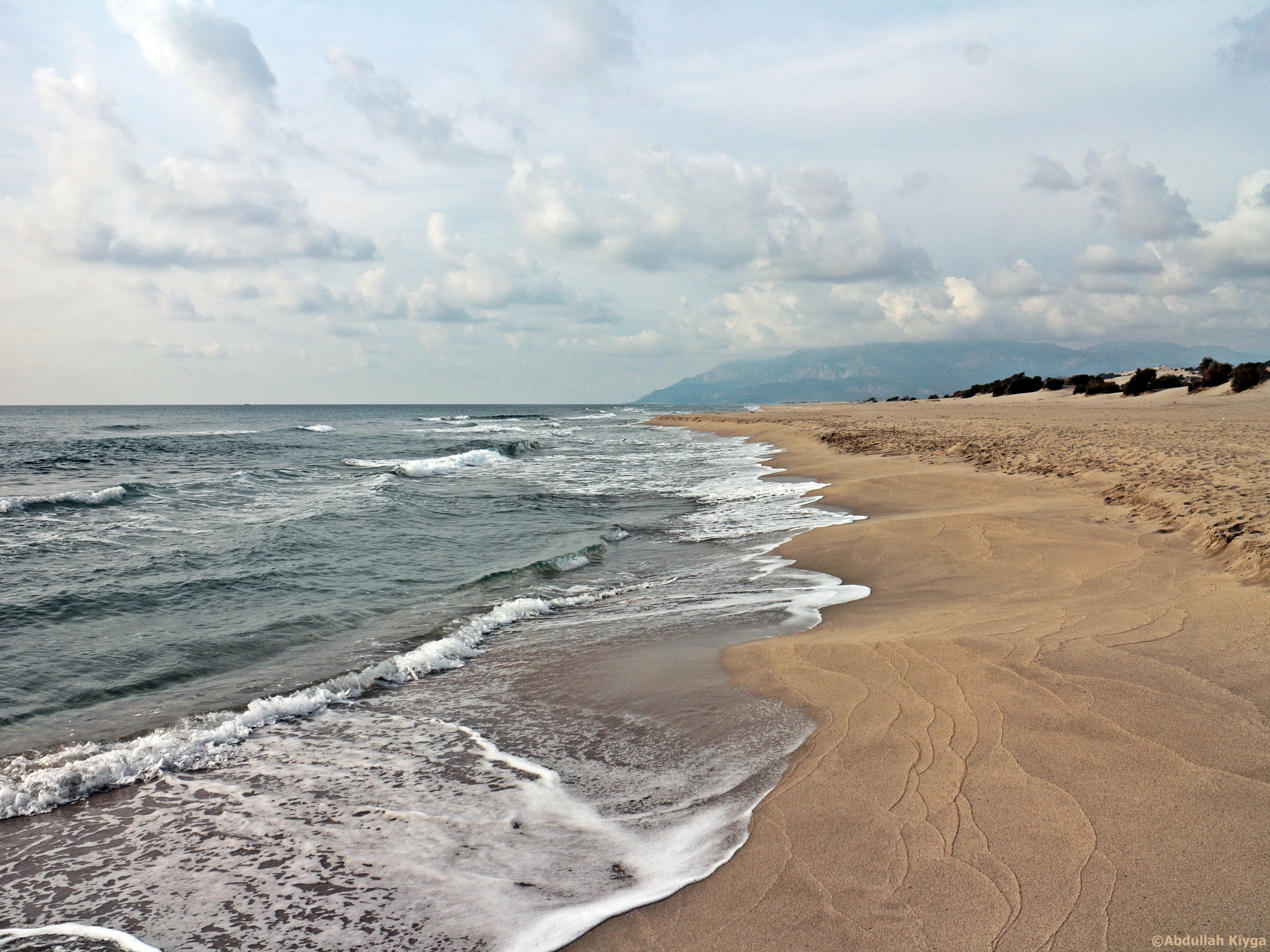
Patara Beach

=== Districts ===

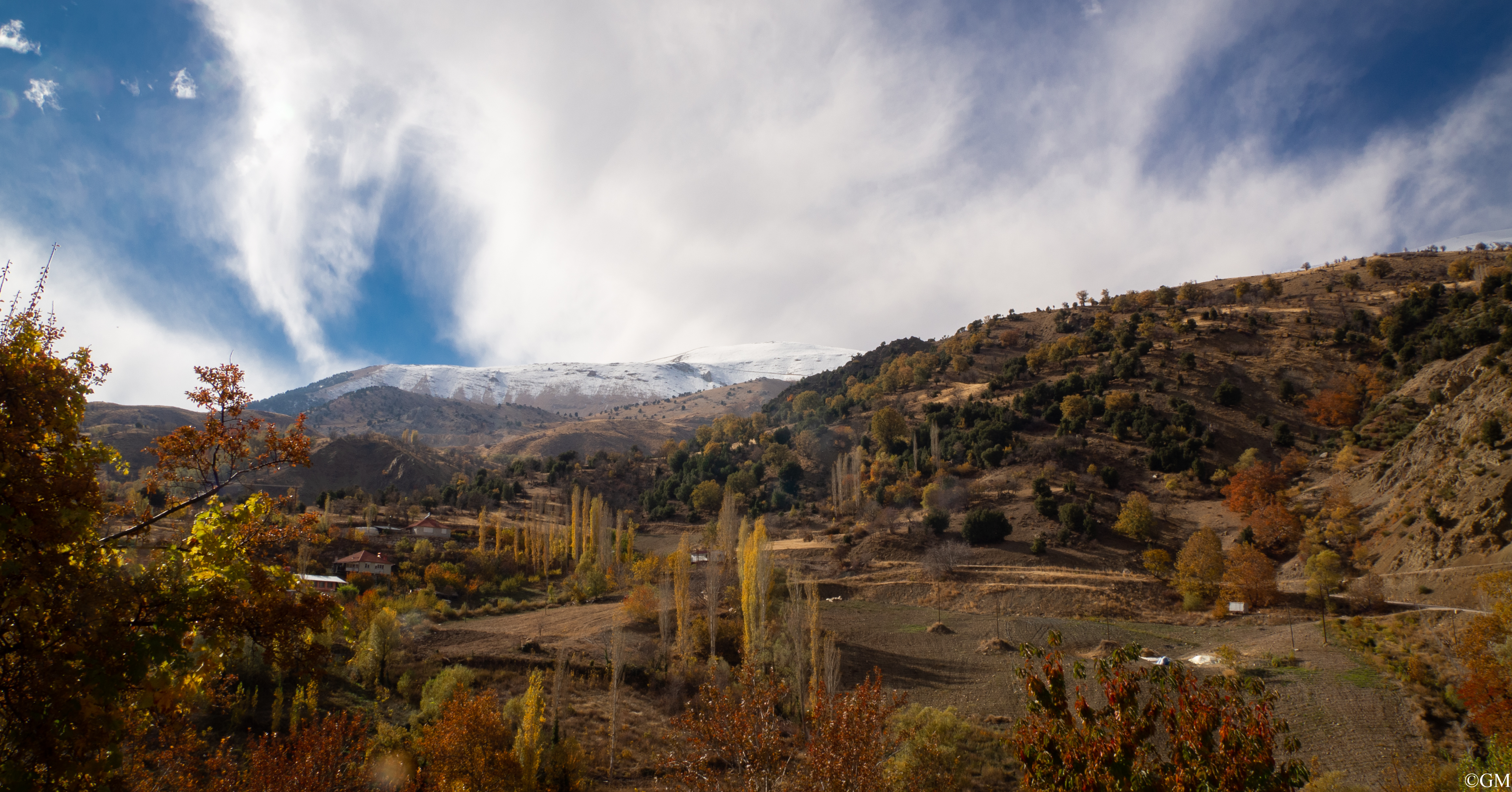
A view from Korkuteli/Antalya.

Antalya province is divided into 19 districts:

- Akseki
- Aksu
- Alanya
- Demre
- Döşemealtı
- Elmalı
- Finike
- Gazipaşa
- Gündoğmuş
- İbradı
- Kaş
- Kemer
- Kepez
- Konyaaltı
- Korkuteli
- Kumluca
- Manavgat
- Muratpaşa
- Serik

== Demographics ==
Historical population
| Year | Pop. | ±% p.a. |
|---|---|---|
| 1927 | 204,372 | — |
| 1935 | 242,609 | +2.17% |
| 1940 | 256,366 | +1.11% |
| 1950 | 311,442 | +1.97% |
| 1960 | 416,130 | +2.94% |
| 1970 | 577,334 | +3.33% |
| 1980 | 748,706 | +2.63% |
| 1990 | 1,132,211 | +4.22% |
| 2000 | 1,719,751 | +4.27% |
| 2011 | 2,035,563 | +1.54% |
| 2020 | 2,548,308 | +2.53% |
Source:Turkstat

The population of Antalya province is estimated 2,426,356 in 2018. Antalya is the fifth province of Turkey with high foreigner resident population which is 6,343.

== Education ==
The province of Antalya has two public (Akdeniz University, Alanya Alaaddin Keykubat University), and three private universities (Alanya University, Antalya Belek University, Antalya Science University). Antalya's compulsory education system is run by the Turkish Ministry of National Education

== Media and broadcasting ==
Antalya has a number of local media such as radio channels (including as TRT's regional radio service based in Muratpaşa) and newspapers. Kanal V, the only active local television network of the province, is aired nationally in Turkey by Turksat 4A satellite.

== Places of interest ==
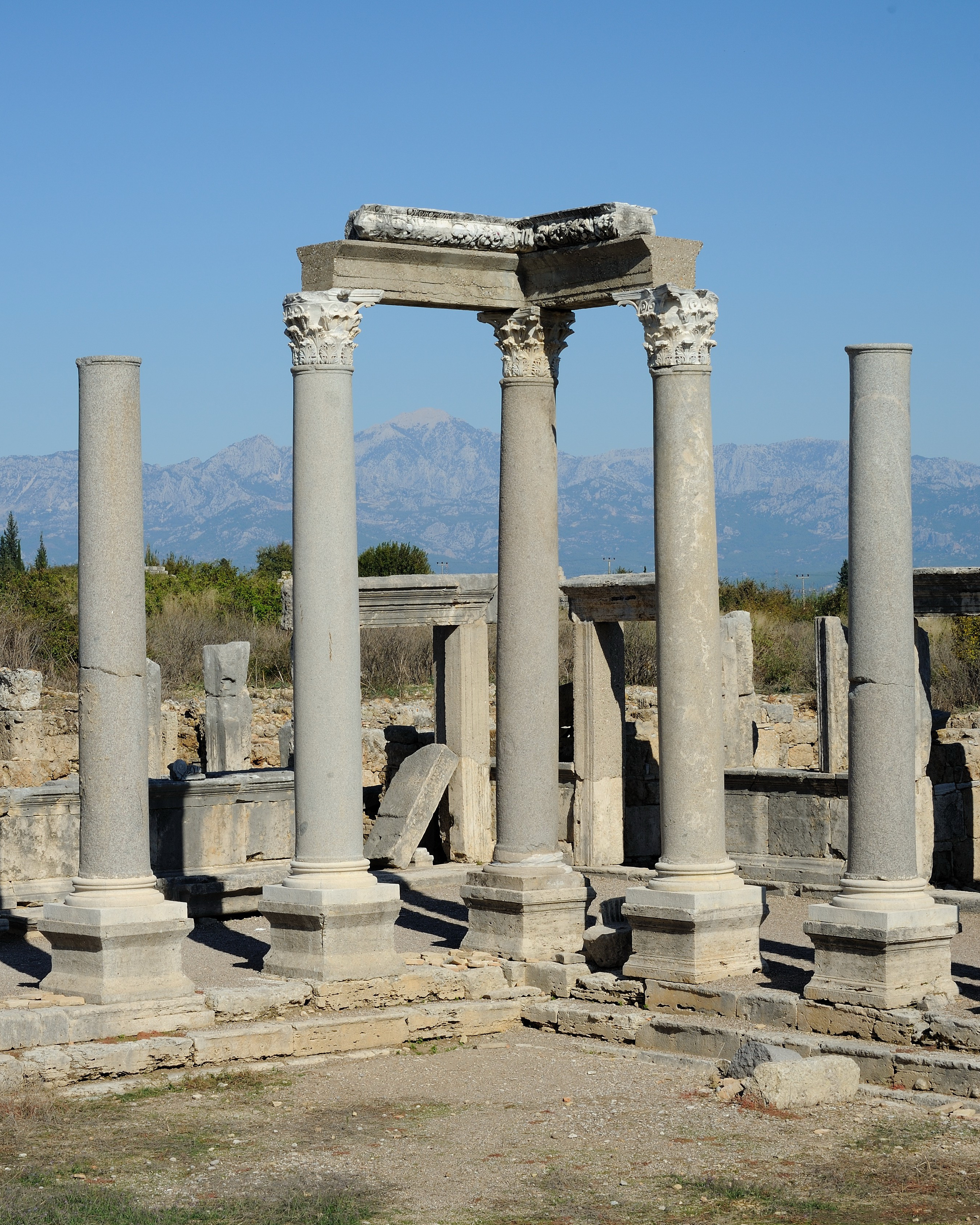
Perga, the capital of Pamphylia, is the second best preserved ancient city of Turkey after Ephesus

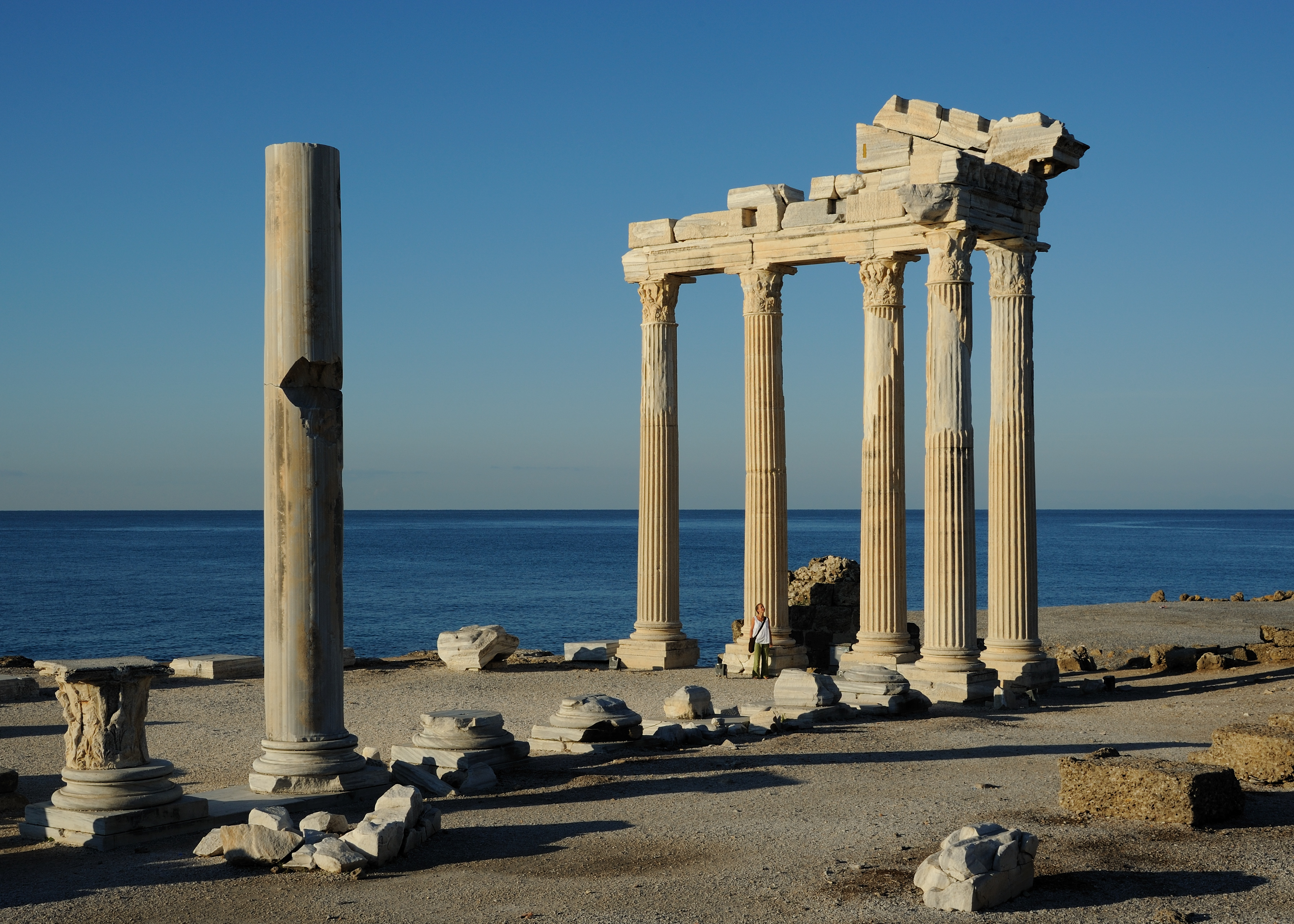
Temple of Apollo in Side

The highest point of the Taurus mountains is Akdağ at an altitude of 3025 metres. Located to the northwest of the city centre and at a distance of 50 km (31 mi) is the Saklıkent ski and recreation centre on Beydağları. Here one can ski and then go down to the shore and into the sea during the months of January–April. In Saklıkent there are two teleski and ski courses along with villas and accommodation facilities available in the area. Situated on Bakırlı Hill behind Saklıkent is the Antalya National Space Observatory. In rivers rafting and canoeing sports and on the Taurus mountains jeep safari, hunting and trekking tours are organised. Alternatively, there is rock-climbing, bird watching tourism, photo-safari, mountain tourism, line fishing and health tourism at the thalasso and dialysis centres in Geyikbayırı. Holy tourism activities are organized in Myra and Patara where St Nicholas was born and lived. The eternal flames of Chimaera that was the inspiration for the Chimera myth is also located in Antalya. In the area of Belek, 30 km (19 mi). east of Antalya, there is a big potential for golf tourism with the bonus of the cultural, historical and natural sightseeing of the region. There are five golf facilities already operating in Belek. There are underwater diving centres on the coast, primarily in Kemer, Çamyuva, Olympos, Adrasan, Kaş, Kalkan, Üçağız, Kekova, Side and Alanya. In addition, yacht tours are organized from the port of Antalya to Düden Waterfall-Karpuzkaldıran and Kemer, from Side to Alanya, from Demre-Çayağzı to Kekova, from Kaş to Kekova, from Kemer to Çıralı-Olympos-Adrasan and Cape Gelidonya. There are also boat tours on Manavgat creek and canoe tours on Xanthos creek. In addition, Blue Cruise, which covers the southwestern Anatolian coast, ends in Antalya. There are ferryboat trips from Alanya to Cyprus and from Antalya to Italy. Antalya today is a tourism centre with touristic accommodation facilities, nature and historic sites.

=== Ancient cities and ruins ===
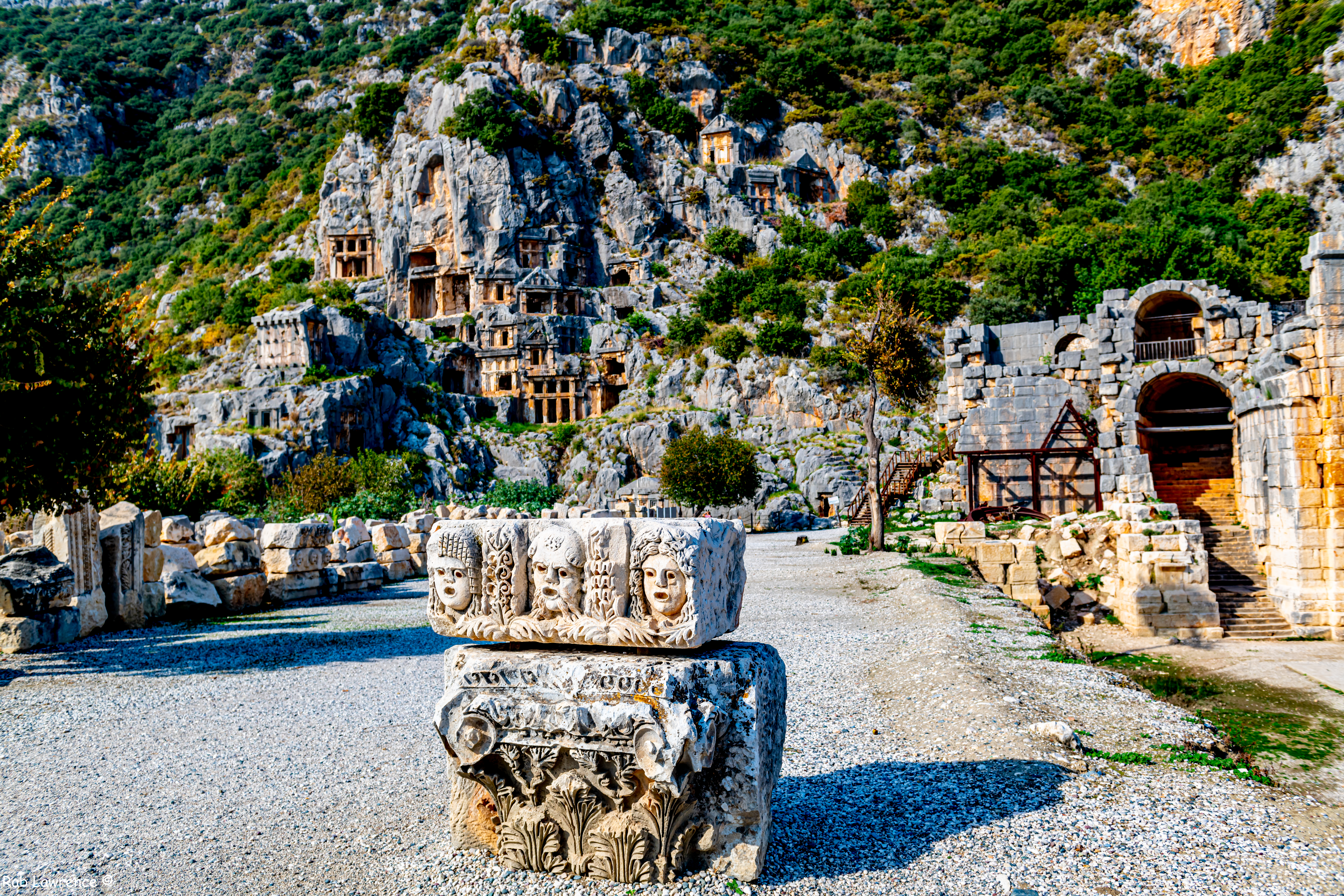
Lycian tombs of Myra.

There are sites of historical and archaeological interest all over Antalya including

- The Pisidian city of Ariassos 22 km (14 mi). along the Antalya-Burdur highway.
- In the district of Kumluca: Acaliasos, Cormus, Gagae, Idebessos, Kitanaura, Olympos and Rhodiapolis
- In the district of Kale: Andriake, Antiphellos, Apallai, Myra, Phellos, Sure
- In the district of Üçağız: Apollonia, Hysa, Ilysa, Istloda, Teimiusa
- In the district of Finike: Arycanda, Limyra, Melanippe, Trebema, and Lycian rock graves
- In the district of Kemer, (southwest of Antalya): Idyros, and the Lycian city of Phaselis, and the castle of Gedelme.
- In Side; the town itself, Seleucia (Pamphylia), a temple of Athena and another of Apollo
- The church of Saint Nicholas in Demre
- The caves of Beldibi, Damlataş and Karain
- Hadrian's Gate, the Roman fortification and the clock tower in the city of Antalya itself. Also near the city the Pamphilian city of Aspendos, Perge (on two hills, once the capital of Pamphylia) and the Pisidian city of Termessos, high in the mountains 35 km (22 mi) northwest of Antalya.
- Karaburun and Seyamük in Elmalı
- Kyneai in Kaş
- Poğla in Korkuteli
- Silliyon (the town of Serik), dates back to the 4th century BC
- Simena in Kekova
- Tlos
- The ancient Lycian city of Xanthos (Kınık)
- The ancient city of Lyrborton nearKepez.
- The Carvanserai's of Kirkgöz and Evdirhan in Doşemealti.

=== National parks ===
- Koprulu National Park
- Termessos National Park
- Olympos National Park
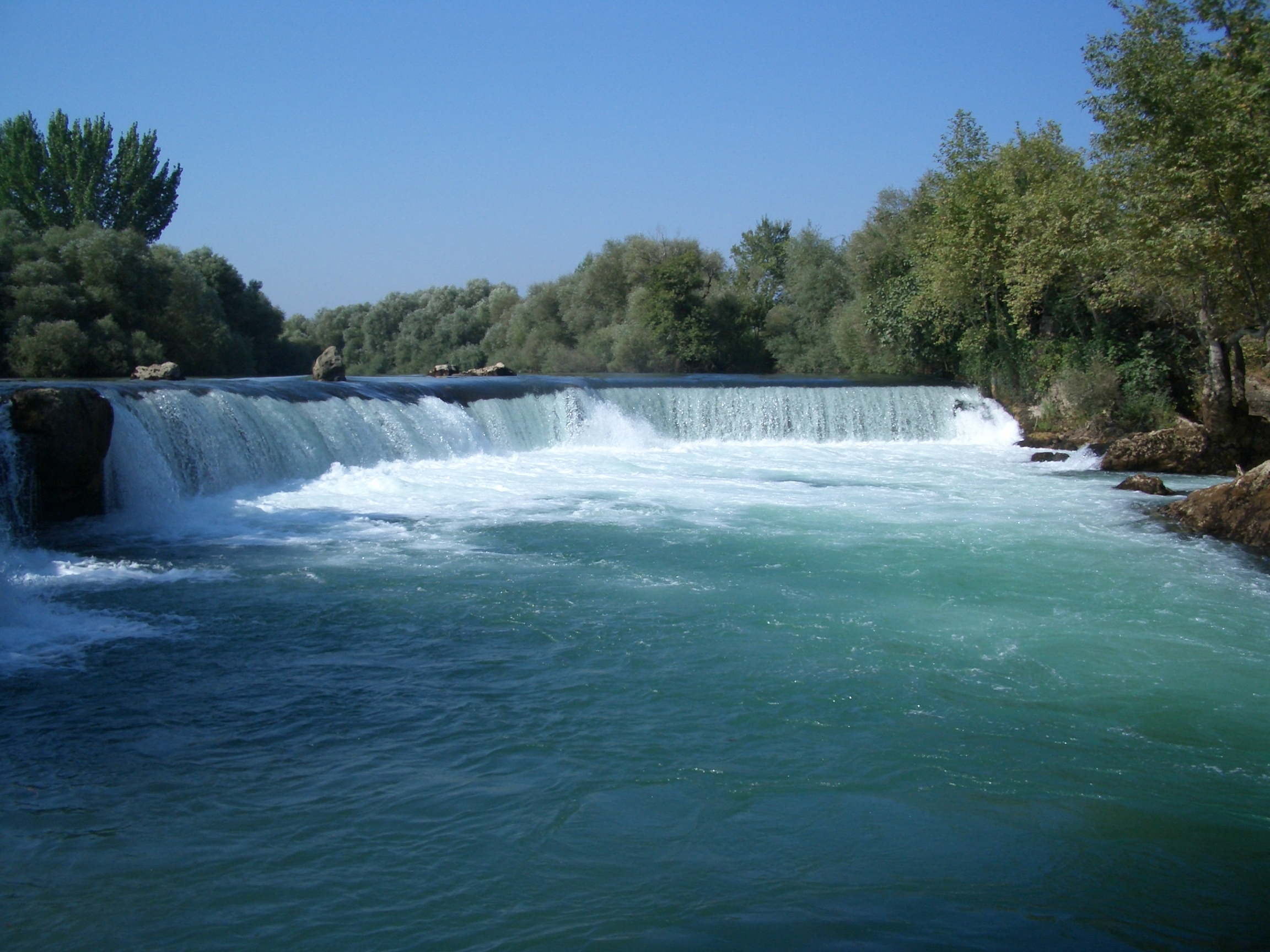
Manavgat Waterfall

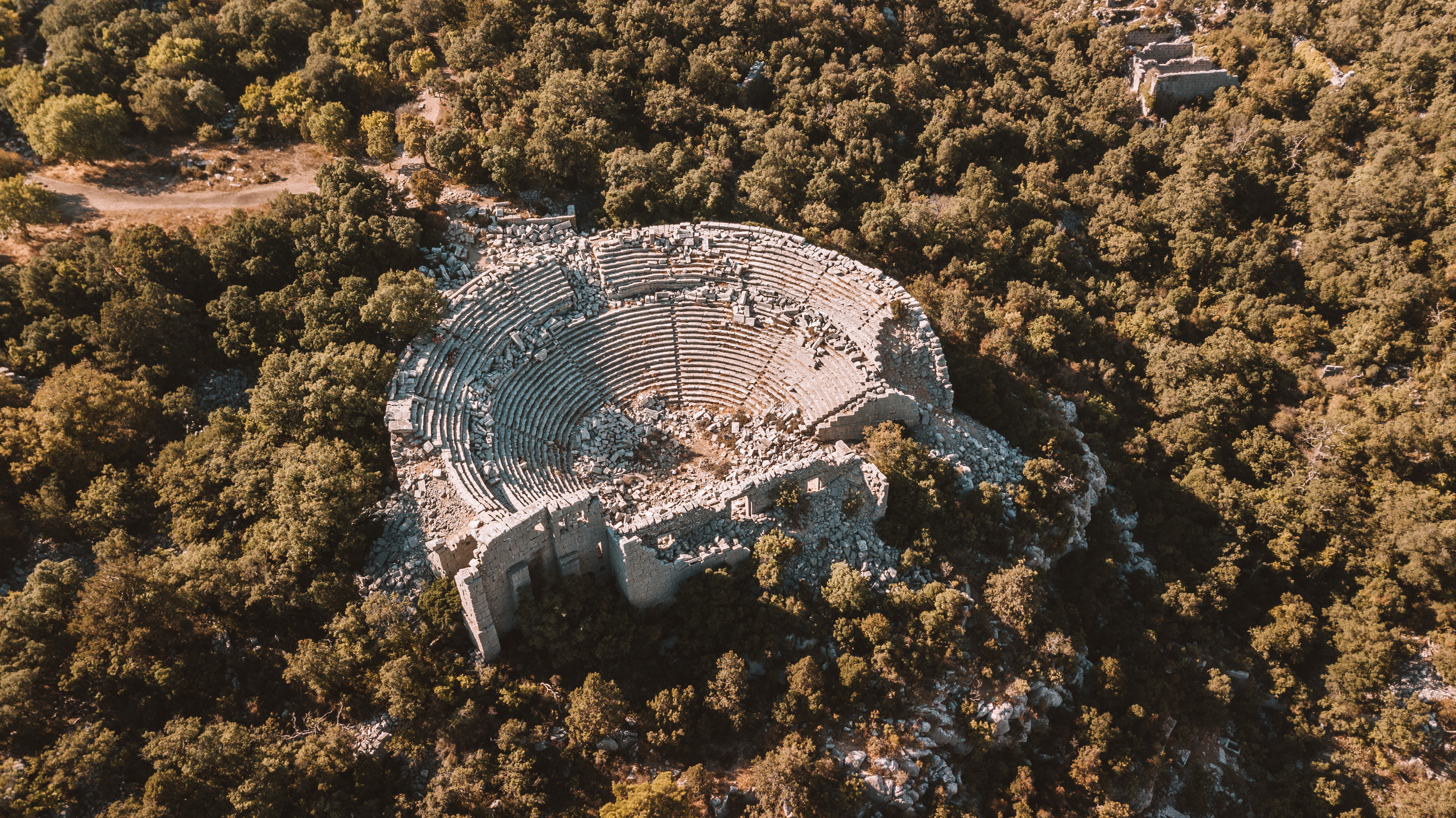
Termessos is an ancient city in the western Taurus

=== Sites of natural beauty ===
- Manavgat Waterfall
- Kursunlu Waterfall
- Duden Waterfall
- Oymapinar Dam
- Köprülü Canyon
- Saklıkent Canyon
- Düzler pine forest
- Saklikent Ski Resort
- Chimaera

=== Caves ===
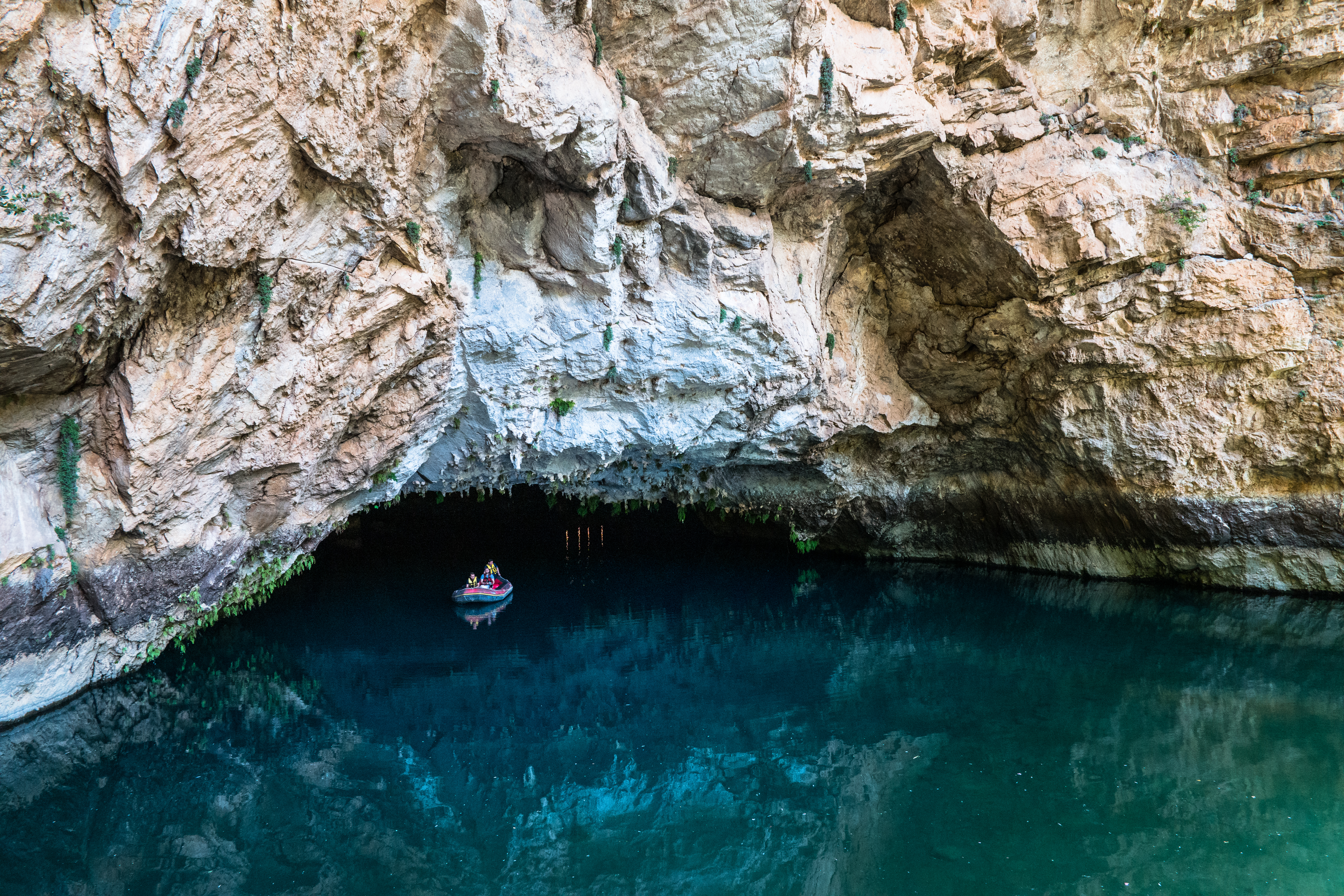
Altınbeşik Cave National Park in Antalya Province.

There are more than twenty caves in Antalya Province, among them some are show caves and registered natural monuments.

- Altınbeşik Cave National Park, İbradi
- Aslanlı Cave
- Beldibi Cave
- Büyükdipsiz Cave
- Çimeniçi Cave, Alanya
- Damlataş Cave
- Derya Cave
- Dim Cave
- Geyiklibayırı Cave, Geyiklibayırı village
- Gürleyik Cave, Akseki, Antalya
- Karain Cave, Yağca, Döşemealtı
- Kocadüden Cave, Akseki
- Kocain Cave,
- Konakaltı Cave
- Küçükdipsiz Cave
- Mahrumçalı Cave, Manavgat
- Oruç Düdeni Cave
- Papazkayası Cave
- Peynirdeliği Cave, Kemer
- Tilkiler Cave
- Yerköprü Cave (Antalya), Ürünlü village, Akseki

== Notable people ==
- Mevlüt Çavuşoğlu, Turkish diplomat and politician; former Minister of Foreign Affairs of Turkey

== See also ==
- Turkish Riviera
