= List of beaches in Turkey =

This is a list of beaches in Turkey.

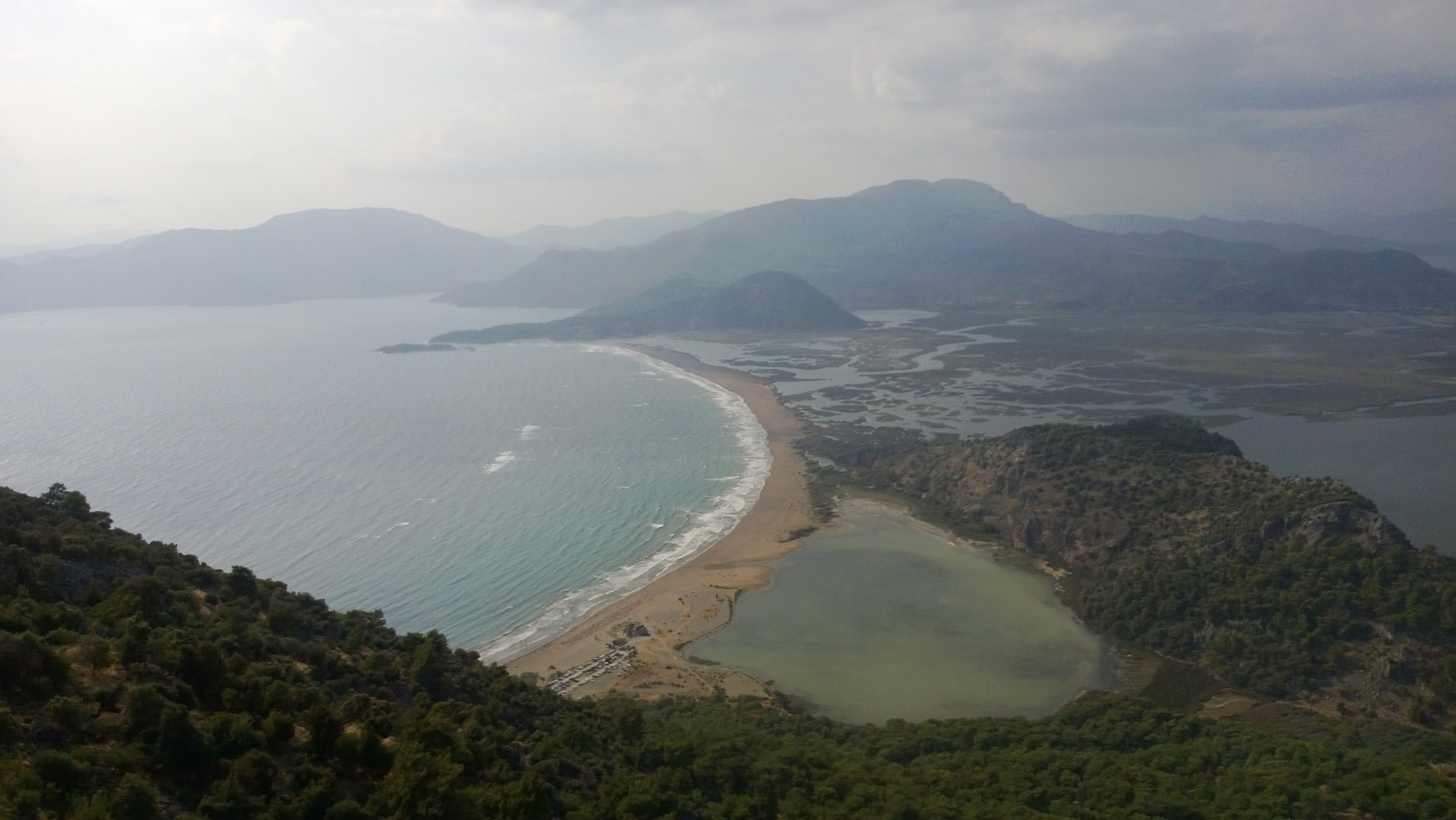
İztuzu Beach

== Mediterranean ==
- Patara Beach
- Konyaaltı Beach
- İztuzu Beach
- Kaputaş Beach
- Kelebekler Vadisi
- Lara Beach, Antalya

== Aegean Sea ==
- Ladies Beach, Kuşadası
- Altınkum Beach, Aydın

== Black Sea ==
- Akçakoca Beach, Düzce
- Solar Beach, Kilyos, İstanbul
- Ayazma Beach, Şile, İstanbul
- Kumbaba Beach, Şile, İstanbul
- Uzunkum Beach, Şile, İstanbul
- Ağva Beach, Ağva, İstanbul
- Kilimli Beach: Kilimli, İstanbul
- Sahilköy Beach: Sahilköy, İstanbul
- Doğancılı Beach: Doğancalı, İstanbul
- Sofular Beach: Ağva, İstanbul
- Şile People's Beach: Şile, İstanbul
- Kumbaba – Ağlayankaya Beaches: Şile, İstanbul
- Kabakoz Plajı: Ağva, İstanbul
- Akçakese Plajı: Ağva, İstanbul
- İmrenli Plajı: Ağva, İstanbul

== Marmara Sea ==
- Kurşunlu Beach, Bursa

== Unsorted ==
- Antalya
- Bodrum
- Çeşme
- Dalaman
- Didim
- Foça
- İztuzu Beach, Dalyan
- Kaputaş Beach, Kaş - Kalkan
- Kleopatra Beach, Alanya
- Ölüdeniz, Fethiye
- Patara Beach
- Urla

== See also ==
- List of beaches
