= Erymnae =

Erymnae or Erymnai (ancient Greek: Ὲρυμναί) may refer to:

- Erymna, a town of ancient Pamphylia
- Eurymenae, a town of ancient Thessaly
