= Altınbeşik Cave National Park =

National park in Antalya, Turkey

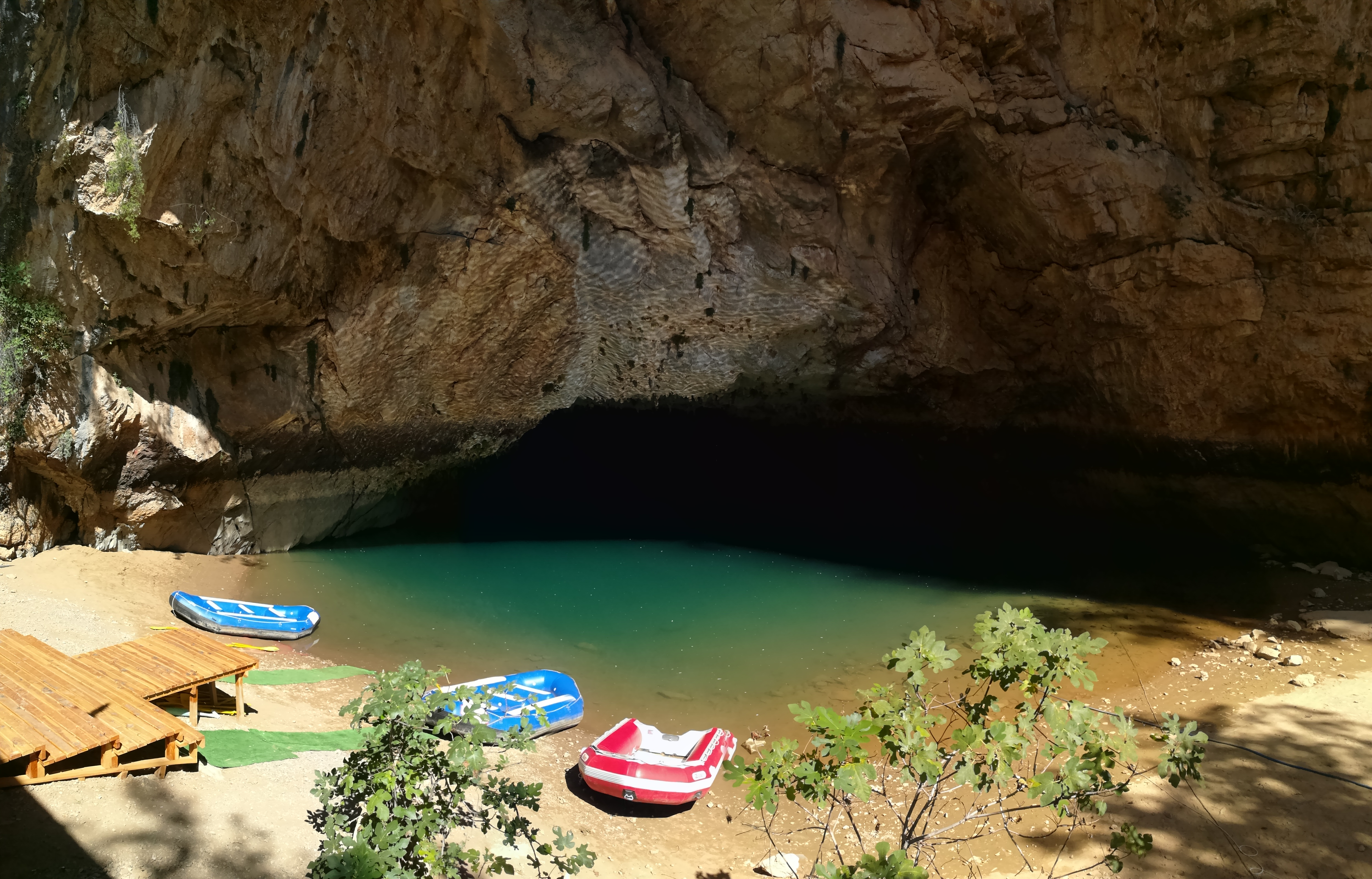

- Location within Turkey
- Location: İbradı, Antalya Province, Turkey
- Coordinates: 37°02′14.71″N 31°37′59.99″E
- Area: 1,147 ha (2,830 acres)
- Established: August 31, 1994
- Governing body: Ministry of Forest and Water Management
- Website: www.milliparklar.gov.tr/mp/altinbesikmagarasi/index.htm

Altınbeşik Cave National Park (Turkish: Altınbeşik Mağarası Milli Parkı), established on August 31, 1994, is a national park in southern Turkey. It is located in the İbradı district of Antalya Province.

== Properties ==
Altınbeşik Cave is the largest below surface lake cave in Turkey. Its estimated arms reach 2200 meters. The depth of the lake reaches 15 meters in some regions. Altınbeşik Cave is suitable for visiting in summer and autumn. Since the water level of the cave rises in winter and spring, it is closed to visitors.
