= Kalkan =

- Neighbourhood
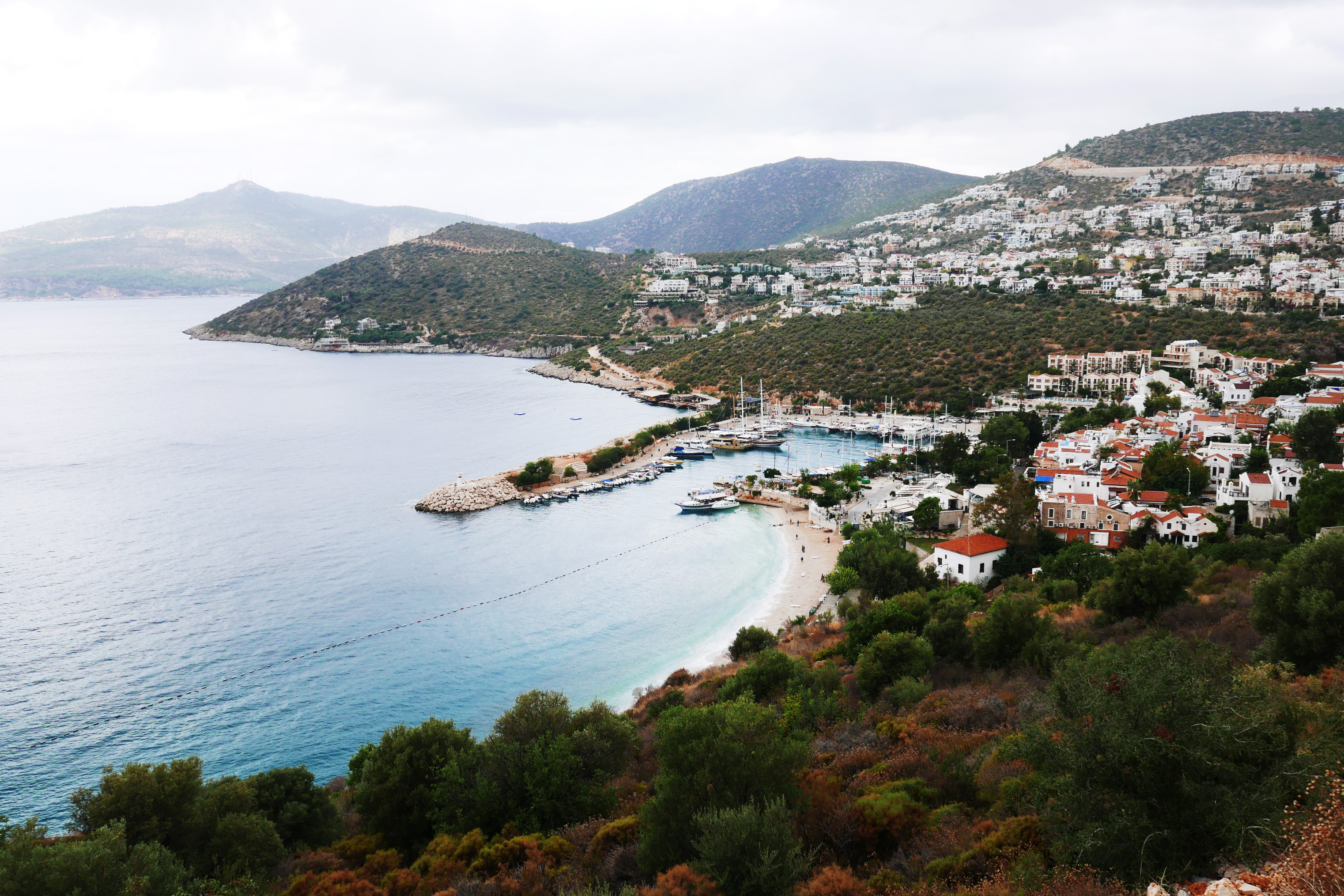
- A view of the coast at Kalkan

- Location within Turkey
- Coordinates: 36°16′00″N 29°24′40″E
- Country: Turkey
- Province: Antalya
- District: Kaş
- Population (2022): 3,926
- Time zone: UTC+3 (TRT)
- Postal code: 07960
- Area code: 0242

Kalkan is a neighbourhood of the municipality and district of Kaş, Antalya Province, Turkey. Its population is 3,926 (2022). Before the 2013 reorganisation, it was a town (belde). It is an important tourist destination on the Mediterranean coast. The area includes historical sites (such as Tlos and Kekova) and fine beaches (including Patara Beach and Kaputaş Beach).

Kalkan is an old fishing town, and the only safe harbour between Kaş and Fethiye; it is known for its white-washed houses, descending to the sea, and its brightly coloured bougainvilleas. It averages 300 days of sunshine a year. The word "Kalkan" in Turkish either means shield or turbot referring to the town's fishing status.

A substantial Christian community of Greeks lived in Kalkan until the 1920s and the town was called Kalamaki. They left in 1923 during the exchange of populations between Greece and Turkey after the Greco-Turkish War and emigrated mainly to Attica, where they founded the new town of Kalamaki.

Kalkan was an important harbour town until the 1970s as the only seaport for the environs. It declined after the construction of the Fethiye road but revived after the emergence of the tourism industry in the region.

Although part of the Antalya province administratively, Kalkan is connected more closely to Fethiye economically and for transportation.

The Independent listed Kalkan among the best tourist destinations for 2007. The paper recommended Kalkan, especially for those seeking a romantic holiday and who do not want to travel far from their home country in Europe. According to a 2012 survey 96% of visitors to Kalkan during 2011 were from the United Kingdom.

== See also ==
- Kaputaş Beach
