= İbradı =

- District and municipality
- Map showing İbradı District in Antalya Province

- Location within Turkey
- Coordinates: 37°05′47″N 31°35′46″E
- Country: Turkey
- Province: Antalya

Government
  - Mayor: Hatice Sekmen (AKP)
- Area: 778 km^{2} (300 sq mi)
- Population (2025): 3,256
  - Density: 4.19/km^{2} (10.8/sq mi)
- Time zone: UTC+3 (TRT)
- Area code: 0242
- Website: www.ibradi.bel.tr

İbradı is a municipality and district of Antalya Province, Turkey. Its area is 778 km^{2}, and its population is 3,256 (2025).

İbradı is a high plain in the Taurus Mountains. In summer the weather is dry and cooler than the nearby Mediterranean coast with an average highest temperature of 24,4°C and 14,2°C lowest. The mountains are covered with forests of juniper, cedar and pine, watered by mountain streams that eventually form the Manavgat River. The people of İbradı mainly live from grazing goats on the hillsides and from forestry; there is no commercial farming although people have gardens, vineyards and fruit trees.

== History ==
This area was once part of the antique kingdom of Pisidia, near the river Melas. It is unclear however when the district was first settled.

In the Turkish period the area was an important passage over the Taurus Mountains for traders from the Mediterranean, and was used as a summer retreat from the heat on the coast. There are the foundations of a Seljuk Turkish caravanserai in the district of Kesikbel.

People who live in Ibradi districts today are mainly Teke Turkmens. Same root with today's Teke Turkmens from Turkmenistan. They are member of Oghuz Salur Tribe.

== Population ==
Historical population
Year	Pop.	±% p.a.
2007	4,693	—
2008	3,979	−15.21%
2009	3,509	−11.81%
2010	3,346	−4.65%
2011	3,076	−8.07%
2012	2,907	−5.49%
2013	2,865	−1.44%
2014	2,800	−2.27%
2015	2,761	−1.39%
2016	2,678	−3.01%
2017	2,646	−1.19%
2018	3,618	+36.73%
2019	3,032	−16.20%
2020	2,947	−2.80%
2021	2,868	−2.68%
2022	2,875	+0.24%
2023	4,243	+47.58%
2024	3,411	−19.61%
2025	3,256	−4.54%
Source: TÜİK

== Composition ==
There are 9 neighbourhoods in İbradı District:

- Aşağı
- Aydınyayla
- Başlar
- Çukurviran
- Düzlen
- Ormana
- Ürünlü
- Üzümdere
- Yukarı

== Places of interest ==
- The cave of Düdensuyu - not yet open to the public
- A number of Hellenistic and Ancient Roman sites, including the ruins of the city of Erymna (Ormana)
- Some historic houses in the town of Ormana.

There are of course many places for climbing and mountain walking.
