= Ariassus =

Ancient city in Anatolia

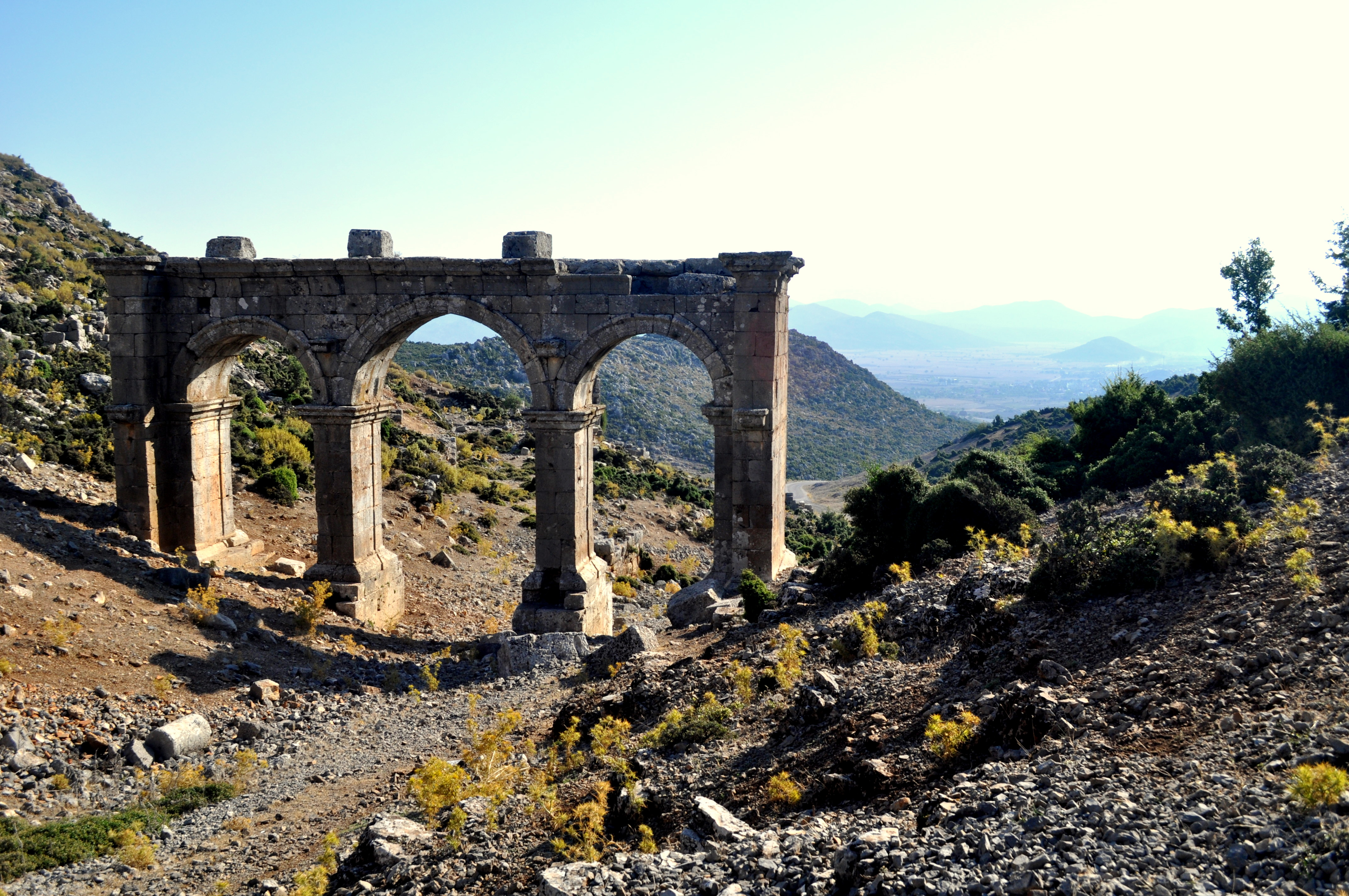
- Ancient entrance to the city

- Location within Turkey
- 37°10′52″N 30°28′21″E
- Type: Settlement
- Location: Antalya Province, Turkey
- Region: Pisidia

Site notes
- Condition: In ruins

Ariassus or Ariassos (Ancient Greek: Ἀριασσός) was a town in Pisidia, Asia Minor built on a steep hillside about 50 kilometres inland from Attaleia (modern Antalya).

== History ==
=== Classical Age ===
==== Hellenistic period ====
The town was founded in the Hellenistic period in the 3rd century BC. It was mentioned (as Aarassos) in about 100 BC by Artemidorus Ephesius, who was quoted by Strabo a century later. The only further mentions are by Ptolemy in the 2nd century AD and in lists of Christian dioceses (Notitiae Episcopatuum).

It was part of Pisidia and belonged originally to the Seleucid Empire. In 189 BC it passed to the Hellenistic kingdom of Pergamum.

==== Roman period ====
In 133 BC, Attalus III of Pergamum left his kingdom to the Roman Republic.

Under Octavian Augustus, Ariassos was made part of the Roman province of Galatia. In the ecclesiastical lists it appears in the late Roman province of Pamphylia Secunda, whose capital was Perge, hence also its bishopric's Metropolitan.

== Remains ==
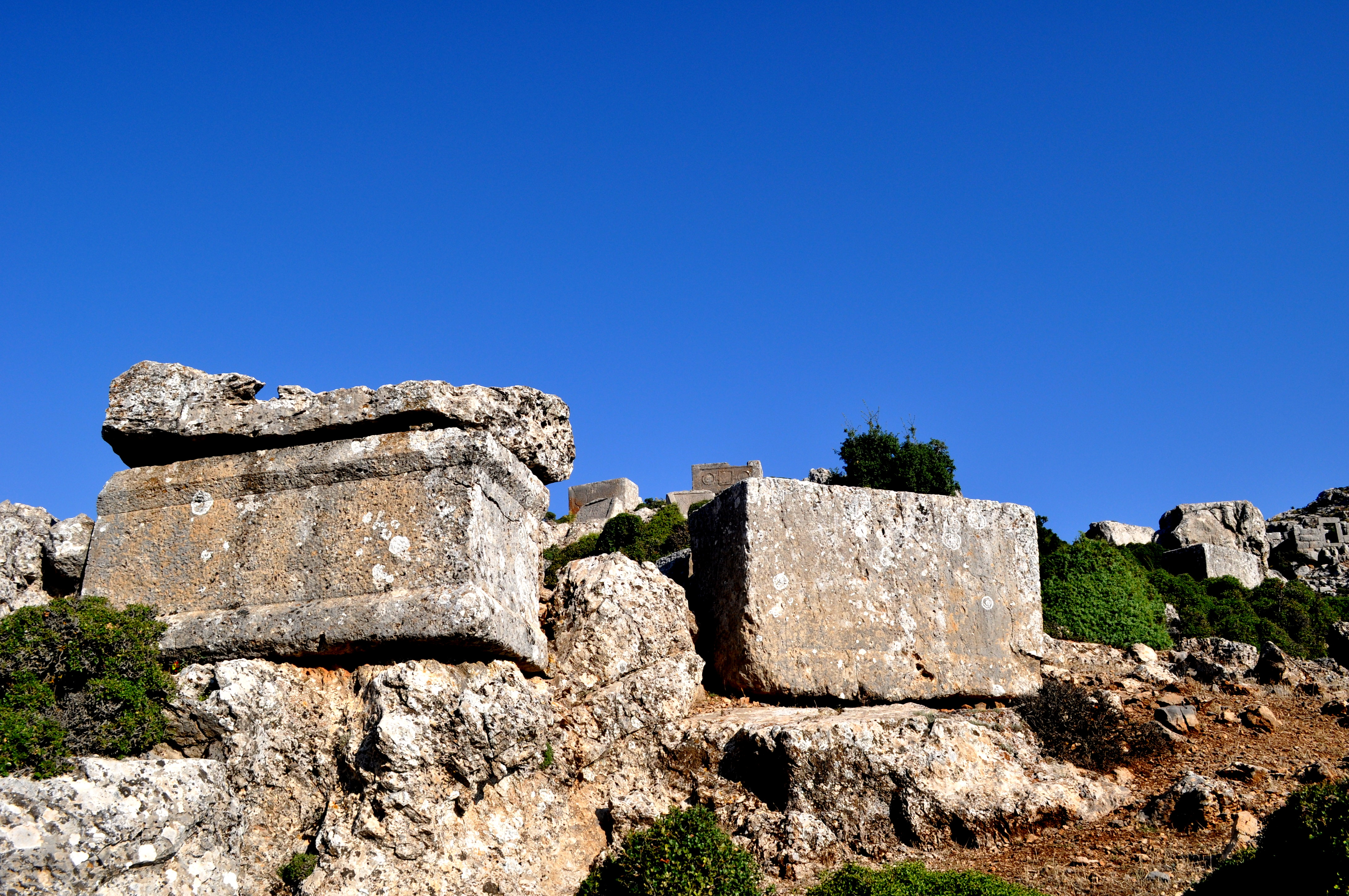
Tombs.

Coins minted at Ariassos are extant.

The ruins are mainly of Roman and Byzantine times, with few remains of the earlier Hellenistic period. The best preserved is that of the 3rd-century-AD triple-arched city entrance once surmounted by four statues. Other buildings include an extensive nymphaeum and baths, as well as a large domestic area. There is an abundance of funerary monuments.

== Bishopric ==
The names of three bishops of the see of Ariassus are known: Pammenius (at the First Council of Constantinople in 381); Theophilus (at the Council of Chalcedon in 451); and Ioannes (signatory of a joint letter of the bishops of the province to Emperor Leo I the Thracian in 458).

=== Titular see ===
No longer a residential bishopric, Ariassus is today listed by the Catholic Church as a titular see.

Nominally restored as a Latin titular bishopric in 1911, it is vacant, having had the following incumbents, all of the lowest (Episcopal) rank :

- Jules-Joseph Moury, Society of African Missions (S.M.A.) (1911.01.17 – 1935.03.29)
- Leoncio Fernández Galilea, Claretians (C.M.F.) (1935.06.18 – 1957.02.15)
- Jean Fryns, C.S.Sp. (1957.04.12 – 1959.11.10)
- Cesar Gerardo Vielmo Guerra, Servites (O.S.M.) (1959.12.19 – 1963.06.16)
- Ignacio María de Orbegozo y Goicoechea (1963.10.29 – 1968.04.26)
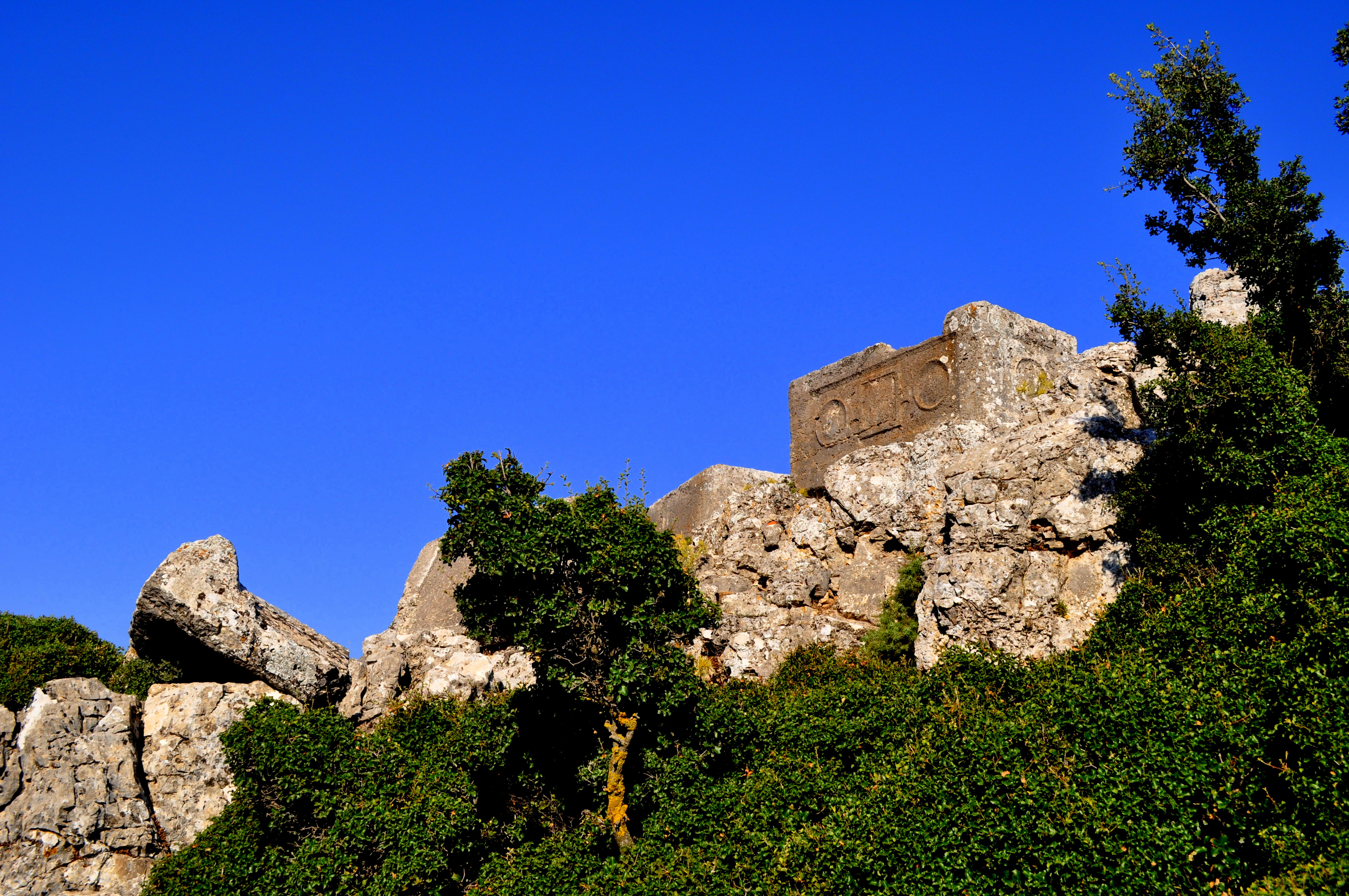

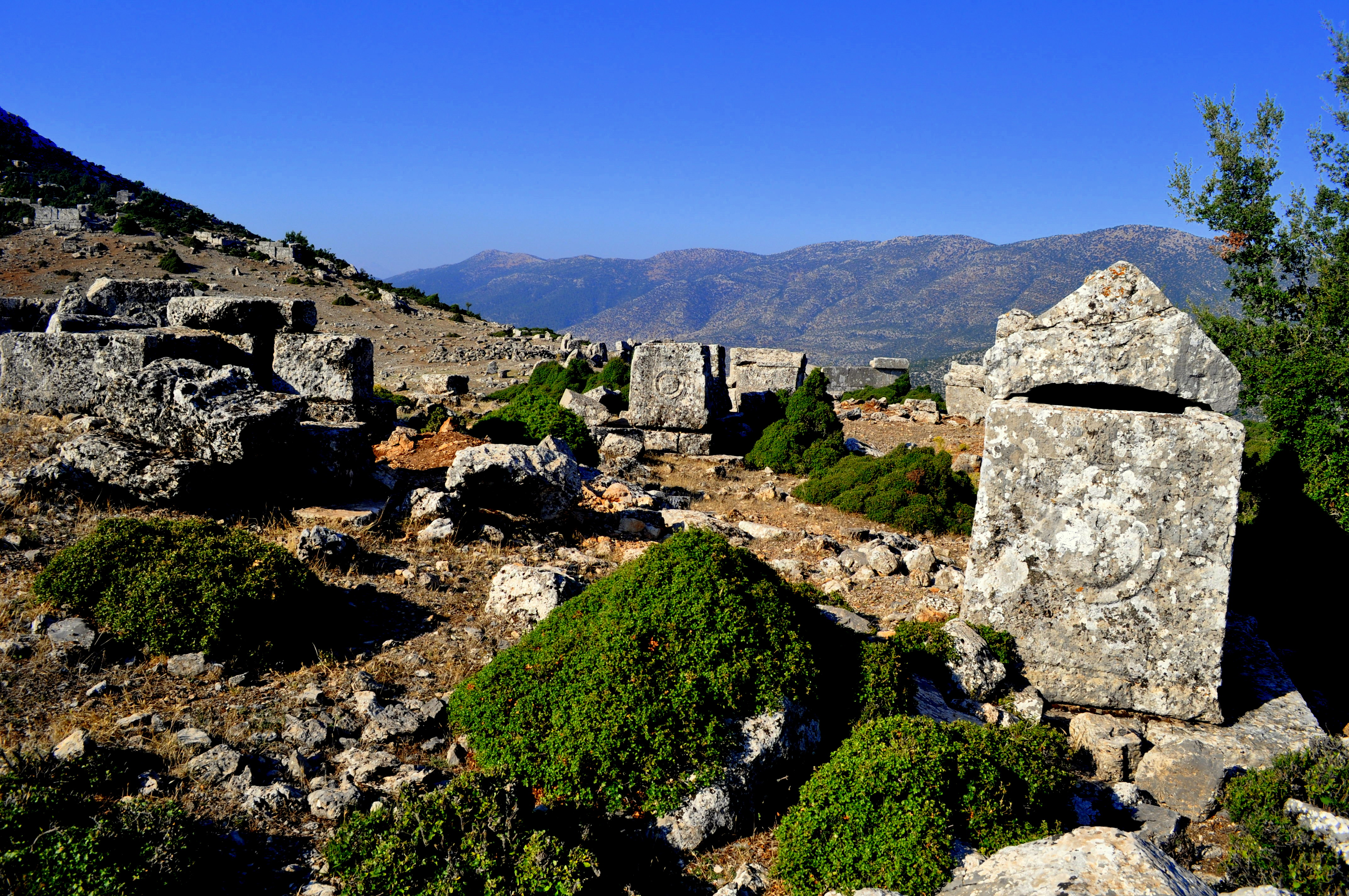

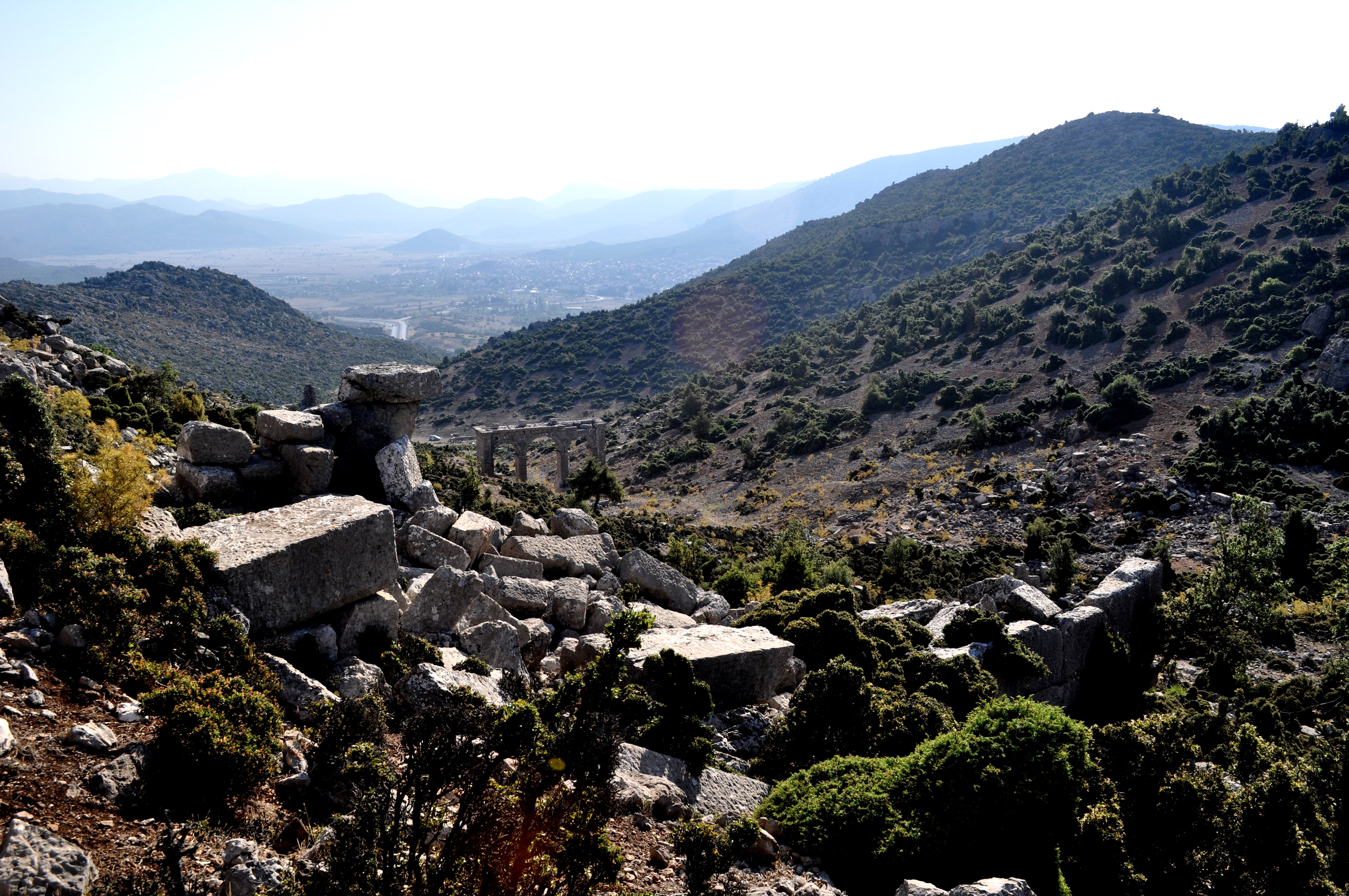

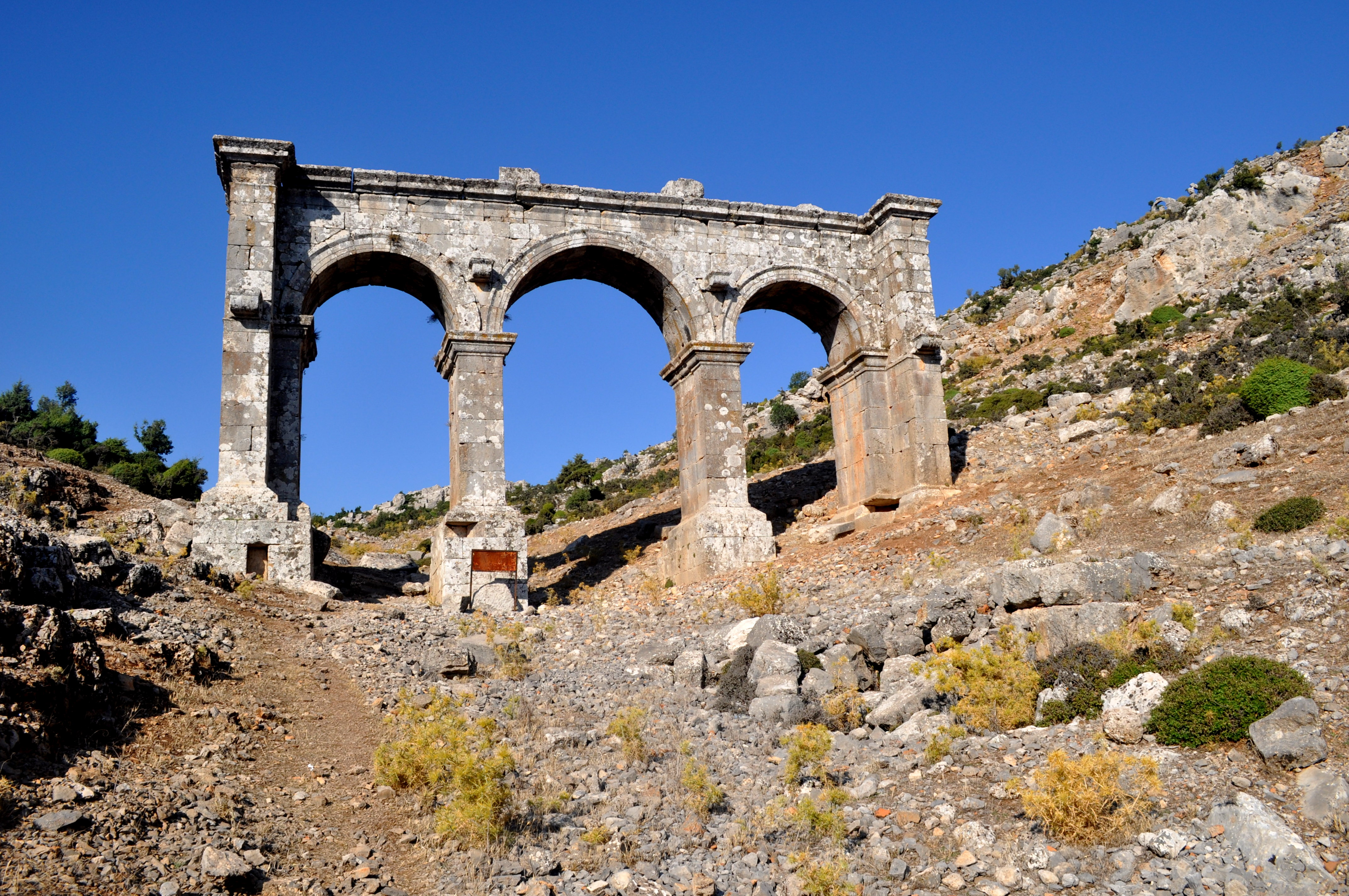

== Sources and external links ==
- GigaCatholic, with titular incumbent biography links
