= Hysa =

Hysa is an Albanian surname. Notable people with the surname include:

- Shefki Hysa (born 1957), Albanian writer and journalist
- Tringa Hysa (born 1996), Albanian ballet dancer
- Vilfor Hysa (born 1989), Albanian footballer
- Ylber Hysa, Kosovar politician

== See also ==
- HYSA (high yield savings account), a type of savings account
- Hysaj (surname)
