= Hysaj (surname) =

Hysaj is an Albanian surname. Notable people with the surname include:

- Alessio Hysaj (born 1999), Albanian footballer
- Elseid Hysaj (born 1994), Albanian footballer
