= Saklıkent =

Ski resort

Coordinates: 36°50′35″N 30°20′11″E

Saklikent is a winter resort in Turkey, 45 kilometres from Antalya and 60 kilometres from Antalya Airport. It is open for skiing from November to May. Saklikent ski resort has one two-seater chairlift, and one T-bar ski lift.
