= Erymna =

Town in ancient Pamphylia or Lycia

Coordinates: 37°04′24″N 31°35′03″E

Erymna (Ancient Greek: Ἐρυμνή) or Orymna (Ancient Greek: Ὄρυμνα) was a town in ancient Pamphylia or Lycia. The form "Orymna" is that given in the Synecdemus and the Notitiae Episcopatuum. and in the ecumenical councils, but inscriptions found on the site show that the inhabitants used the form with "E". Stephanus of Byzantium stated that the form used in the Lyciaca of Alexander Polyhistor was Erymnae (Ancient Greek: Ἐρυμναί, plural of Ἐρυμνή). The modern name of the site is Ormana, reflecting the ancient name.

== Site ==
Little remains of the town. Apart from the foundations of a colonnaded building and a single sarcophagus, only some architectural stones are to be found at Ormana.

== History ==
The town may have earlier been a member of the Kentenneis tribe, but it is known only as a normal independent Greek city. It never issued coinage.

== Bishopric ==
As a Christian bishopric, Orymna was a suffragan see of Side, the capital and metropolitan see of the Roman province of Pamphylia Prima. Its bishop Paulus took part in the Council of Ephesus in 431. Theodorus was at the Third Council of Constantinople in 480 and the Trullan Council of 692. Stephanus was one of the bishops at the Second Council of Nicaea in 787. And Methodius was at the Photian Council of Constantinople (879).

No longer a residential bishopric, Orymna is today listed by the Catholic Church as a titular see.
