= Kaputaş Beach =

Beach in southwestern Turkey

- Beach
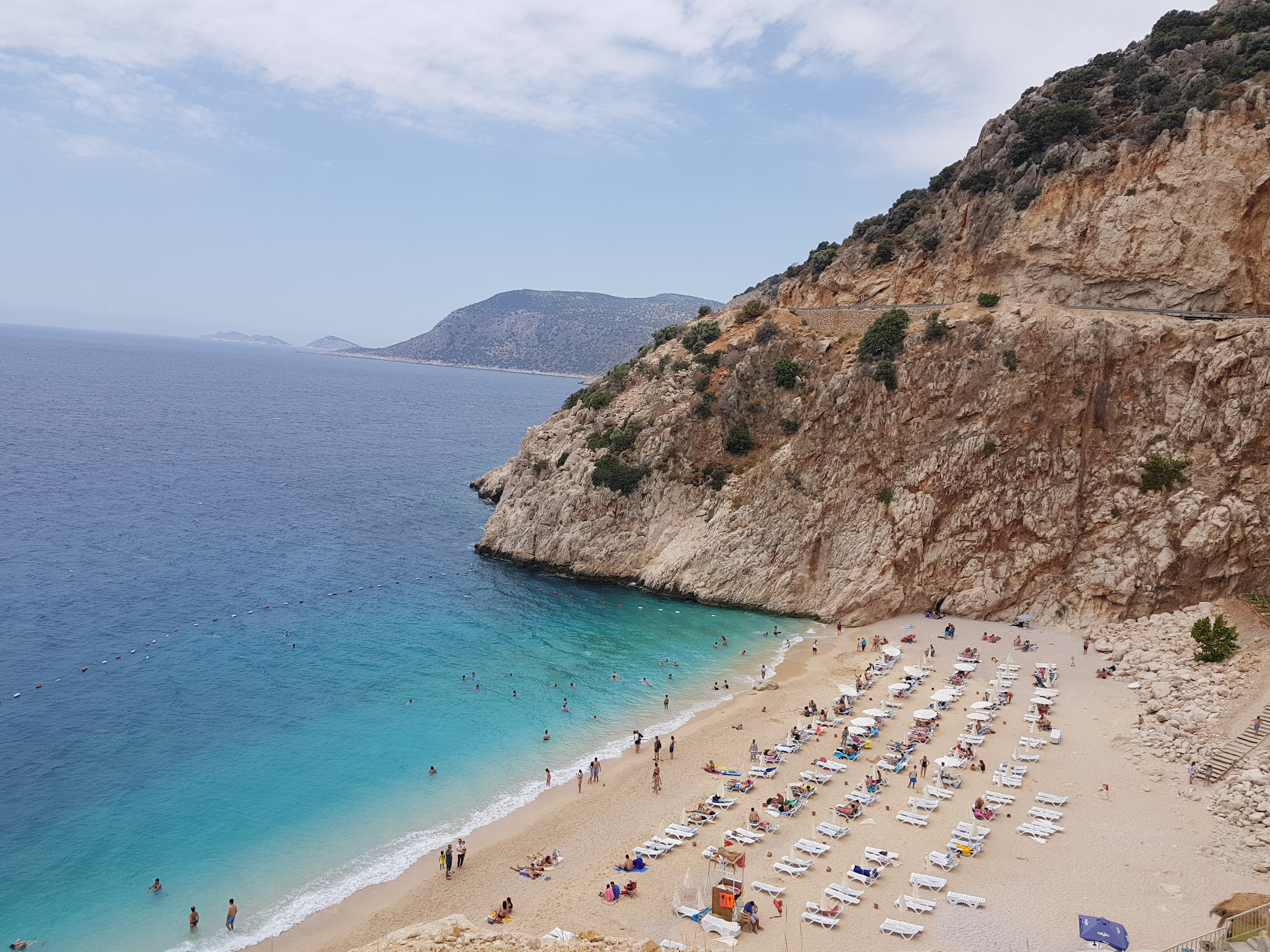
- Interactive map of Kaputaş Beach
- Coordinates: 36°13′45″N 29°26′57″E
- Location: Turkey

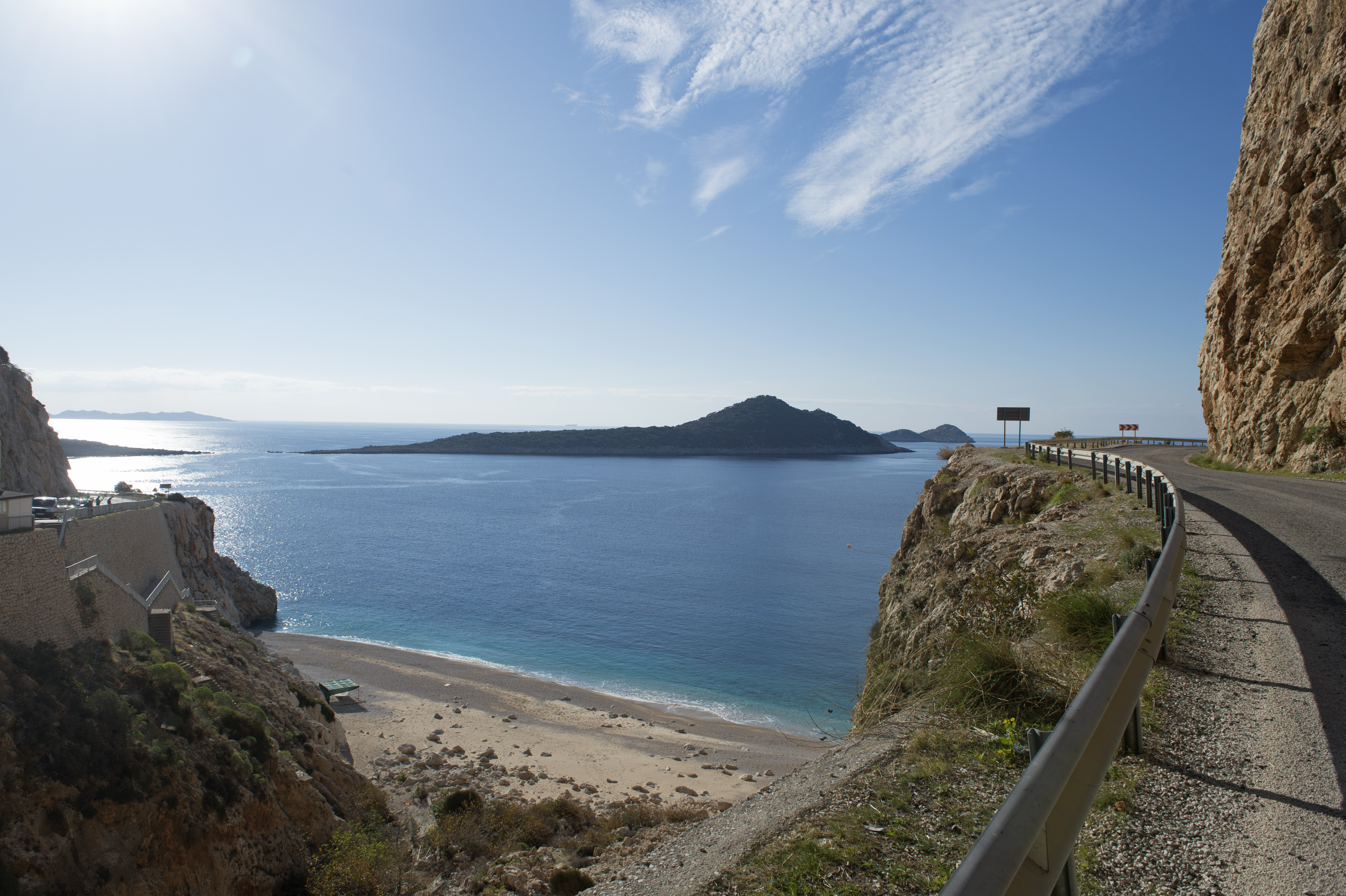
The beach from the State road D400

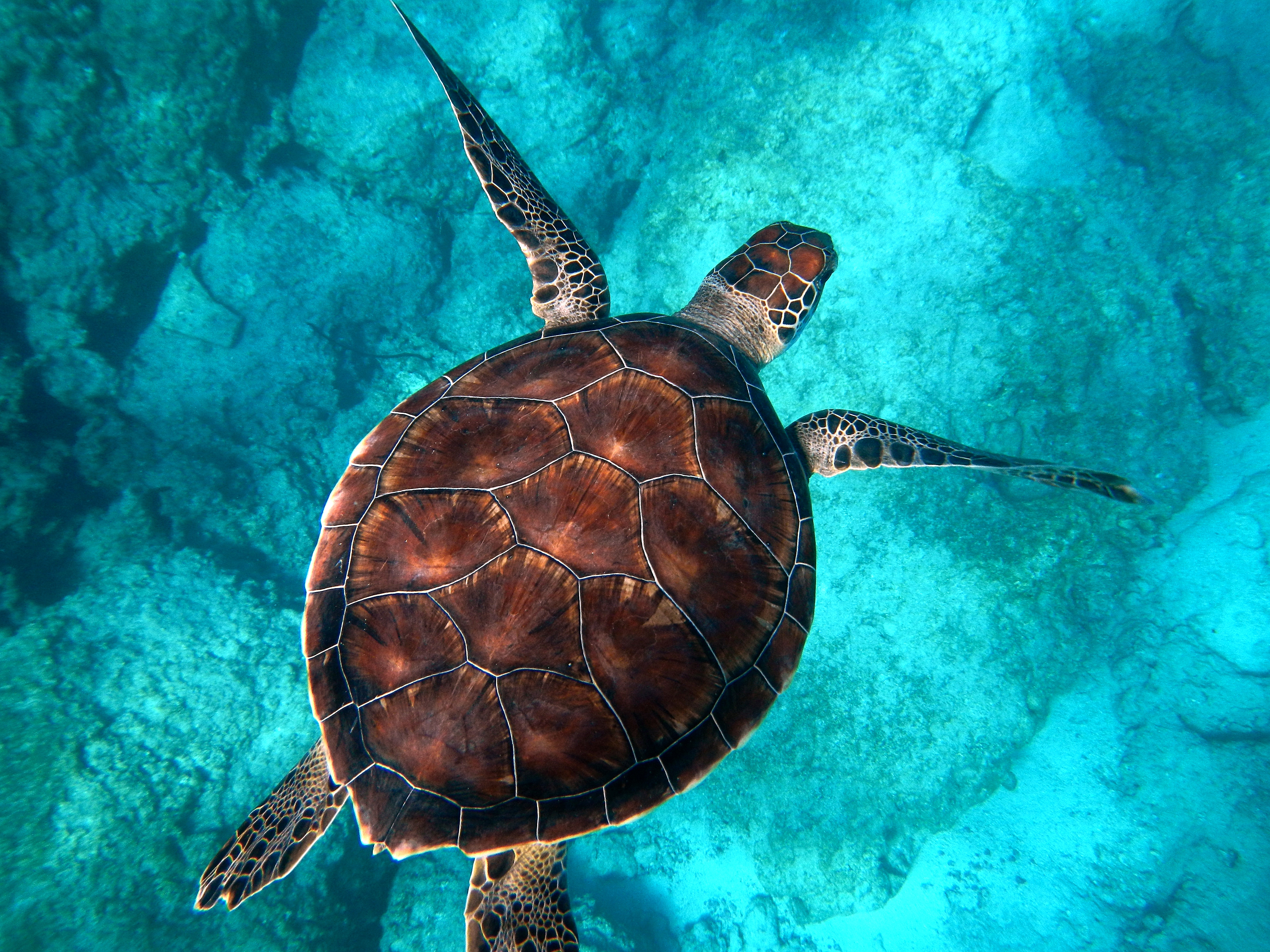
A sea turtle seen swimming off the shores of Kaputas Beach.

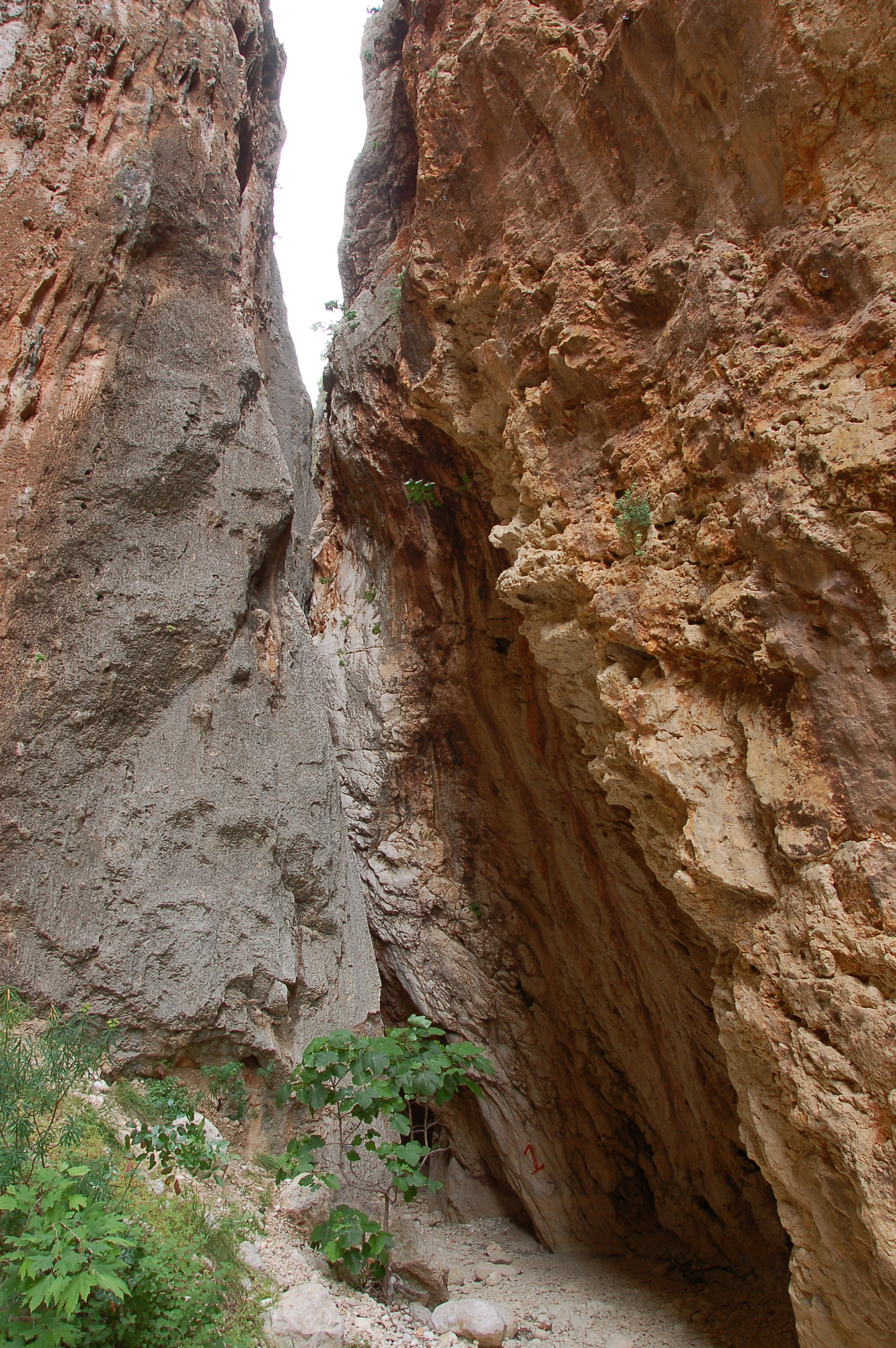
Walkway to Kaputaş Canyon from the beach

Kaputaş Beach is a small beach between Kaş and Kalkan in southwestern Turkey.

== Location ==
The beach is situated at a distance of 20 km from Kaş and 7 from Kalkan, at a point where an extremely narrow valley towered by steep cliffs and forests joins the sea shore in the cove of the same name as the beach (Kaputaş). The beach is popular among visitors to the region due to its natural environment and views from the heights traversed by the State road D400 between Kaş and Kalkan.

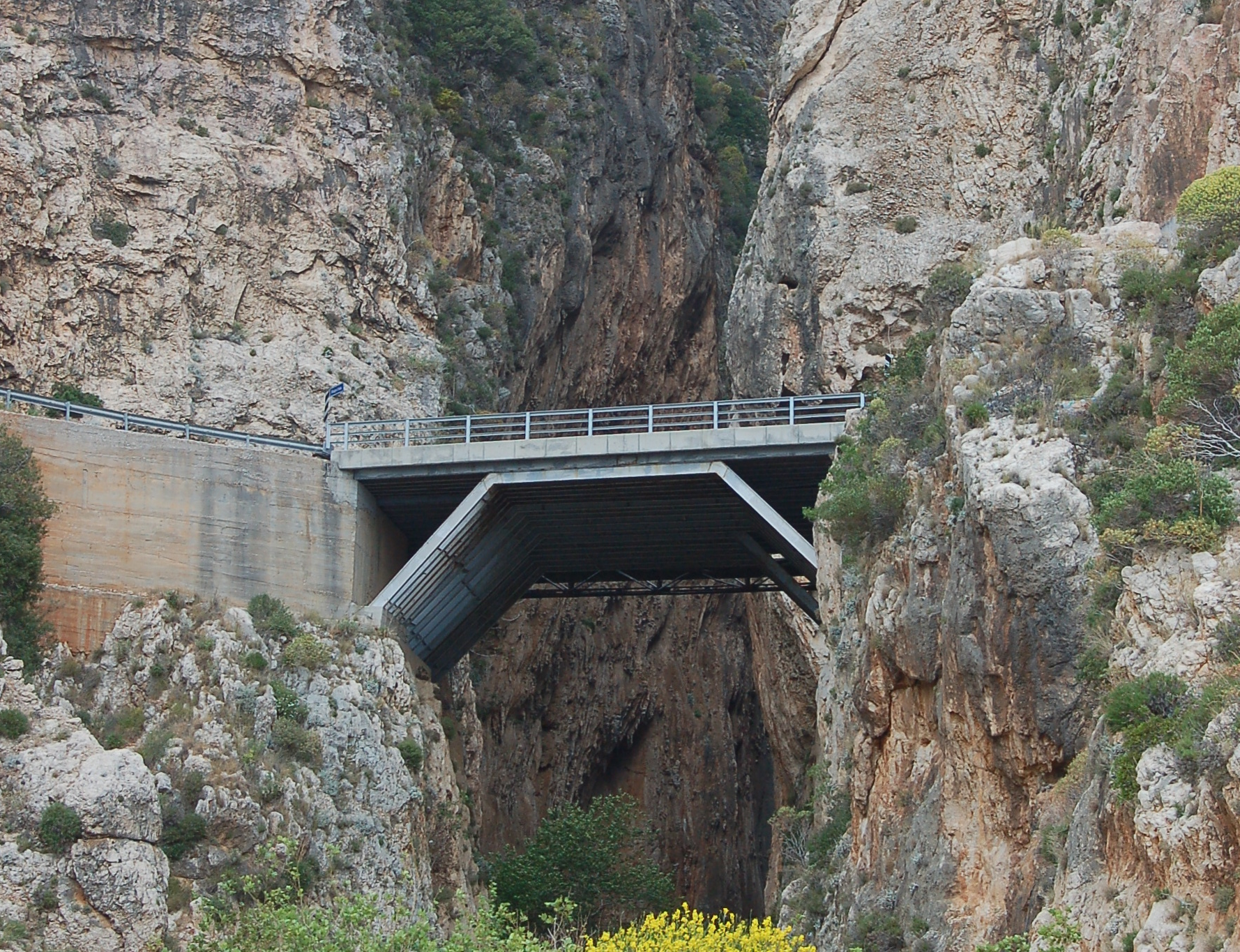
Bridge that links the two roads together

== Facilities ==
There are now toilet facilities, showers, a cafe bar and changing huts at Kaputaş Beach. The beach is reached by 170 steps descending from the road. A limited number of parking paces are available at the street side. The beach is guarded by the municipality of Kalkan. It is also used as a stopover for yachts along the Blue Cruise. The sea gets deep rather close to the beach in Kaputaş.

== Vicinity ==
A deep narrow canyon is located on the other side of the street. It can be reached directly from the beach under the bridge, if no flowing water is present. The canyon has been formed from the abrasion of the rocks by flowing waters over thousands of years. The canyon ends after about 200 meters and has views to the steep walls. Entrance costs 35 Turkish Lira in the summer of 2024.
