= Patara Beach =

Beach in Turkey

- Beach
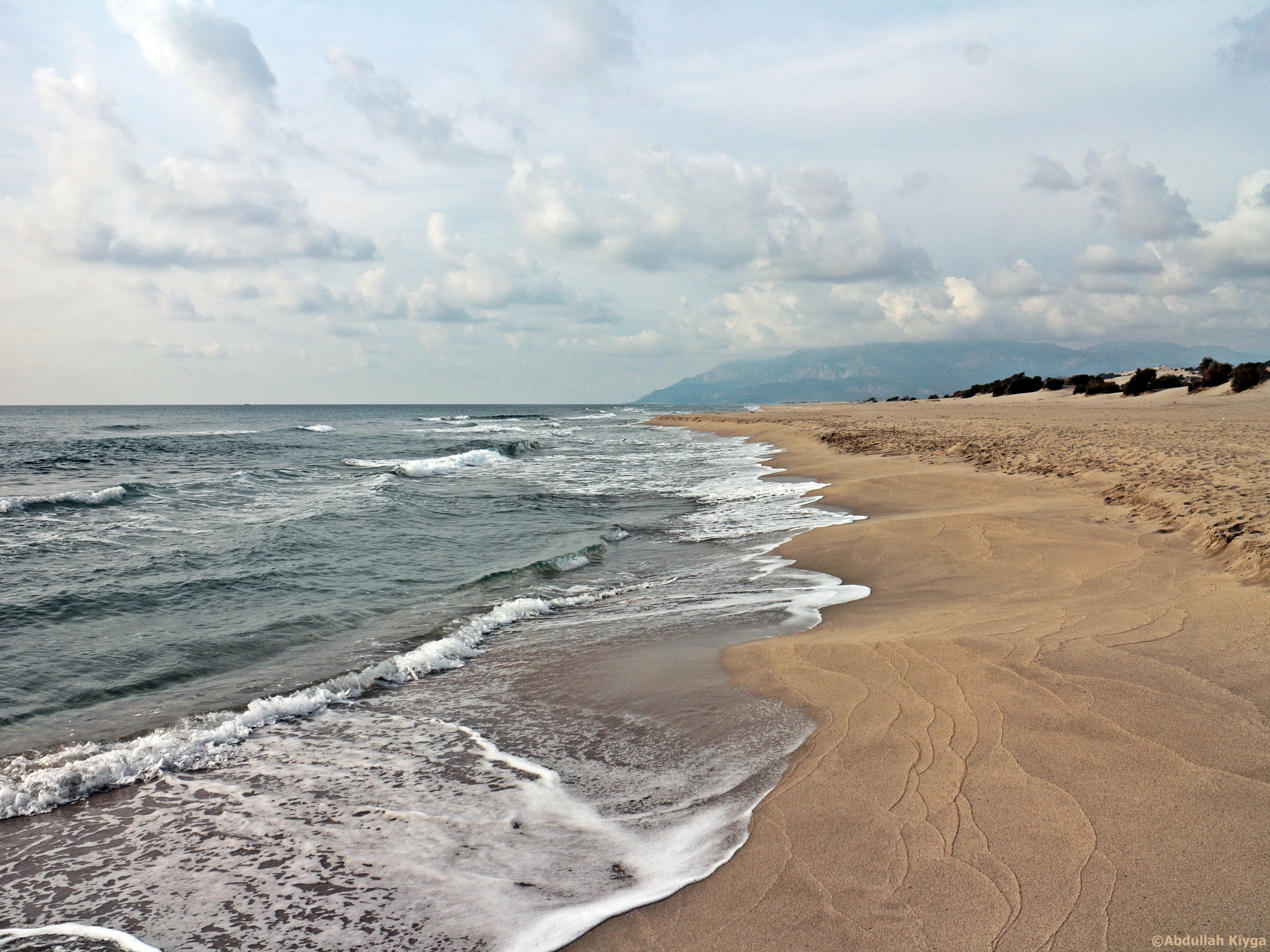
- Patara Beach on the Turkish Riviera
- Interactive map of Patara Beach
- Coordinates: 36°16′20″N 29°17′20″E
- Location: Turkey, Turkish Riviera

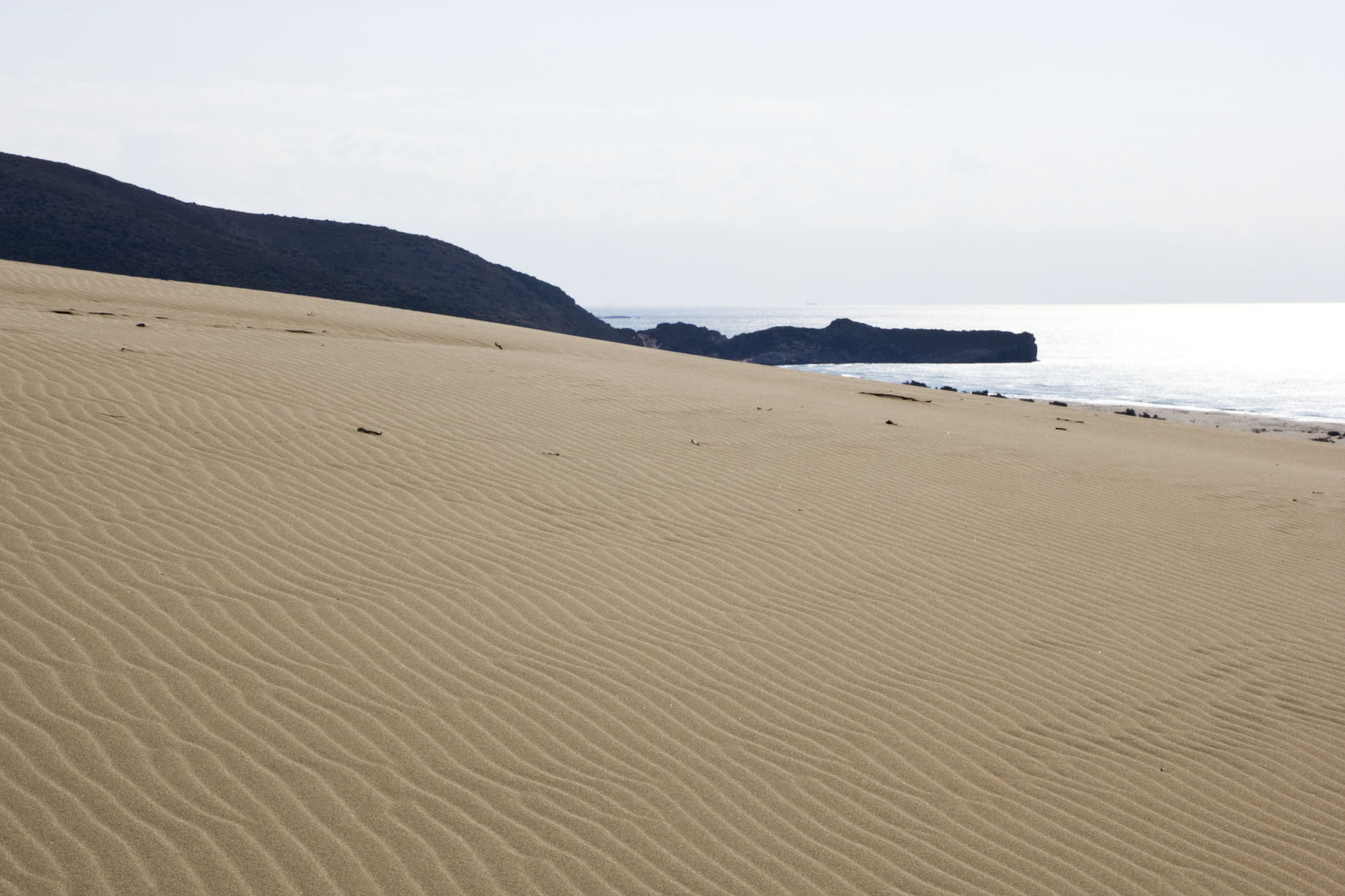
Patara Beach has a desert-like sand cliff that's very popular for tourists.

Patara Beach is a beach located near the ancient Lycian city of Patara in Turkey, on the coast of the Turkish Riviera.

== See also ==
- Turkish Riviera
