= Bridge near Limyra =

Bridge in modern-day Turkey

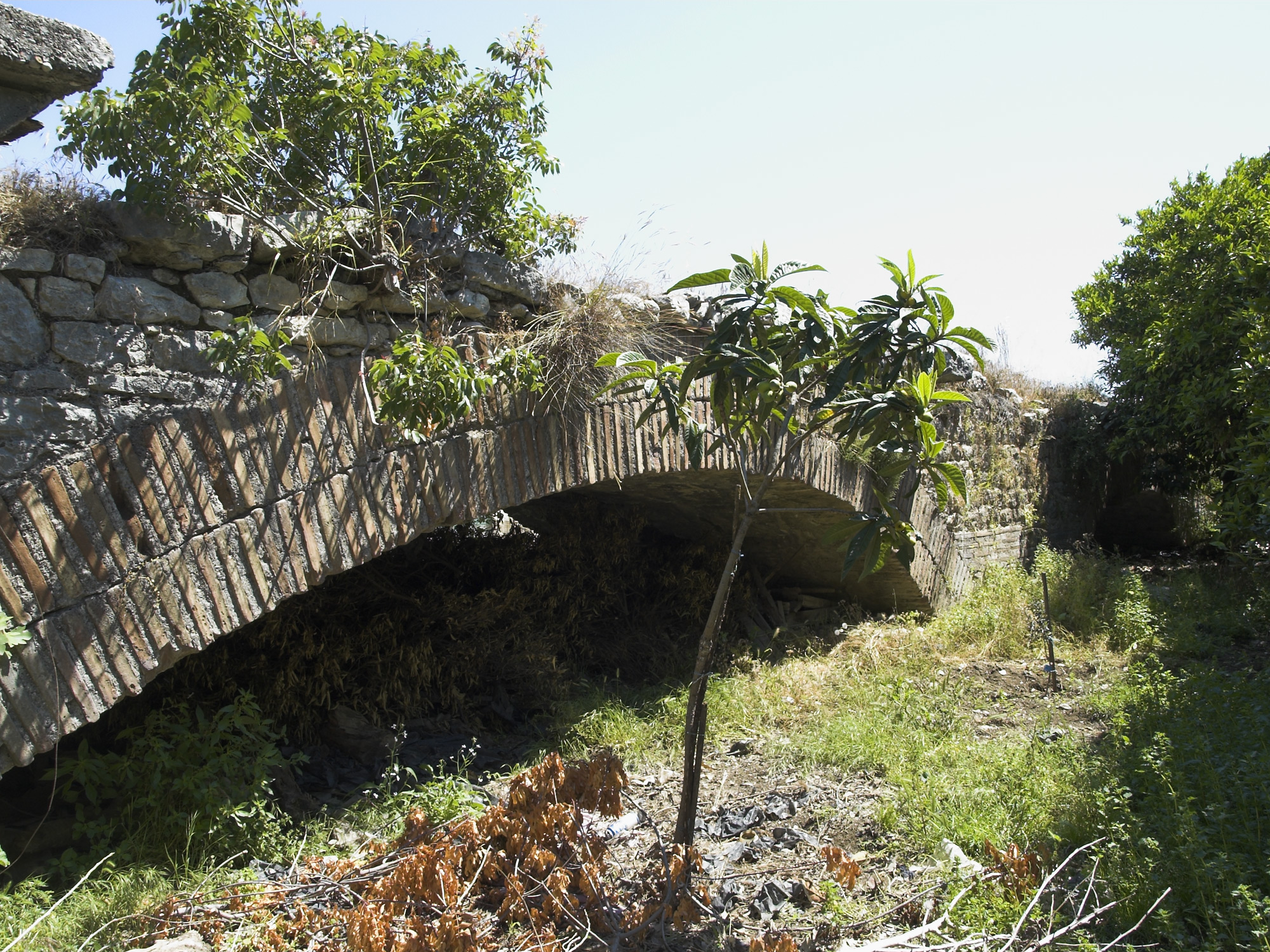
- The 4th arch, today half-buried. The exceptionally flat profile of the arch is evident.
- Coordinates: 36.34887°N 30.20651°E
- Carries: Pedestrian and pack animal traffic
- Crosses: Alakır Çayı
- Locale: Limyra, Lycia, Turkey
- Official name: Kırkgöz Kemeri
- Heritage status: None

Characteristics
- Design: Segmental arch bridge
- Material: Brick, stonemasonry and rubble
- Total length: 360 m (1,181.1 ft)
- Width: 3.55–4.30 m (11.6–14.1 ft)
- Longest span: 14.97 m (49.1 ft)
- No. of spans: 28 (once 27)
- Piers in water: Today approx. 5
- Load limit: 30 t + 500 kp/m²

History
- Construction end: Presumably 3rd century AD

Location
- Interactive map of Bridge near Limyra

The Bridge near Limyra (in Turkish: Kırkgöz Kemeri, "Bridge of the Forty Arches") is a late Roman bridge in Lycia, in modern south-west Turkey, and one of the oldest segmented arch bridges in the world. Located near the ancient city of Limyra, it is the largest civil engineering structure of antiquity in the region, spanning the Alakır Çayı river over a length of 360 m (1,181.1 ft) on 26 segmental arches. These arches, with a span-to-rise ratio of 5.3:1, give the bridge an unusually flat profile, and were unsurpassed as an architectural achievement until the late Middle Ages. Today, the structure is largely buried by river sediments and surrounded by greenhouses. Despite its unique features, the bridge remains relatively unknown, and only in the 1970s did researchers from the Istanbul branch of the German Archaeological Institute carry out field examinations on the site.

== Field examinations ==
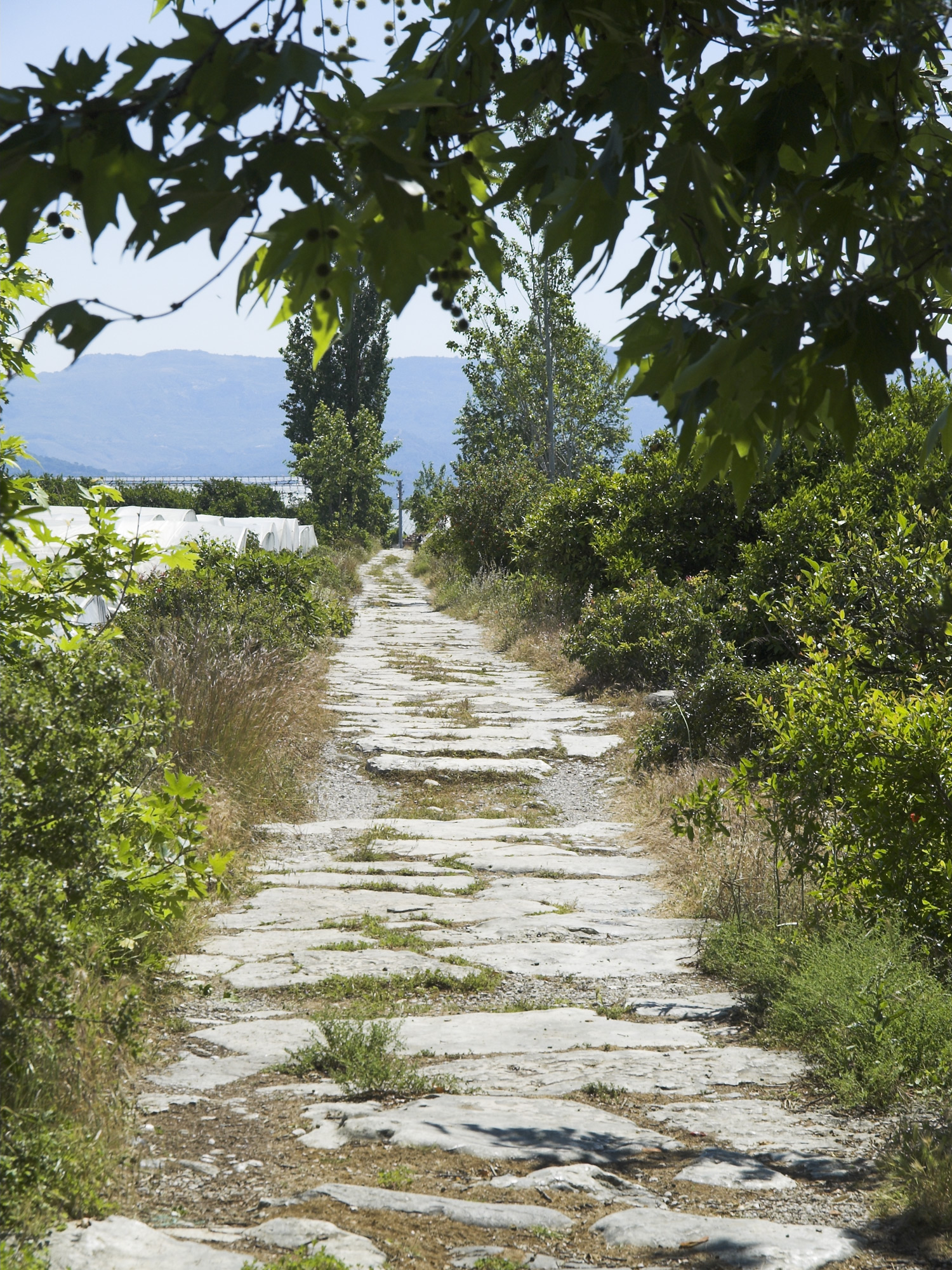
Ancient paving stones. View to the east, along the greenhouses

No information on the bridge survives from ancient sources. The first descriptions appear in European travellers' accounts from the 19th century. The British archaeologist Charles Fellows was the first to explore the region of Lycia, and visited the bridge in May 1840. Fellows, as well as T.A.B. Spratt and Edward Forbes, who visited the site two years later, describe it as having 25 arches. In 1882, an Austrian expedition, including Otto Benndorf, interpreted the structure as part of an ancient road that connected Limyra with the city of Attaleia (modern Antalya) to the east. However, this mission failed to produce any plans or sketches of the site.

The first, and as of 2008 only scientific examination of the bridge was undertaken by the German archaeologists Wolfgang W. Wurster and Joachim Ganzert in two successive days in September 1973, and completed through further visits in subsequent years. Their findings were published in 1978 in the Archäologischer Anzeiger journal of the German Archaeological Institute, with the express intent of bringing the imperiled state of the hitherto almost intact bridge into the spotlight:

Recently, citrus fruit plantations were created in this fertile bottomland; greenhouses for early vegetables are now being built east of the bridge. The bridge is greatly endangered through the beginning of intensive cultivation in the vicinity. The locals strip the still intact bridge surface for stones; bulldozers employed to build irrigation canals rip the structure apart and crush the stone pavement with their caterpillar tracks.

In 1993, the civil engineer Colin O'Connor summarized their report in his English-language monograph on Roman bridges, and also emphasized the exceptional character of this bridge. No further scientific examinations of the Limyra Bridge are known.

== Location and situation ==
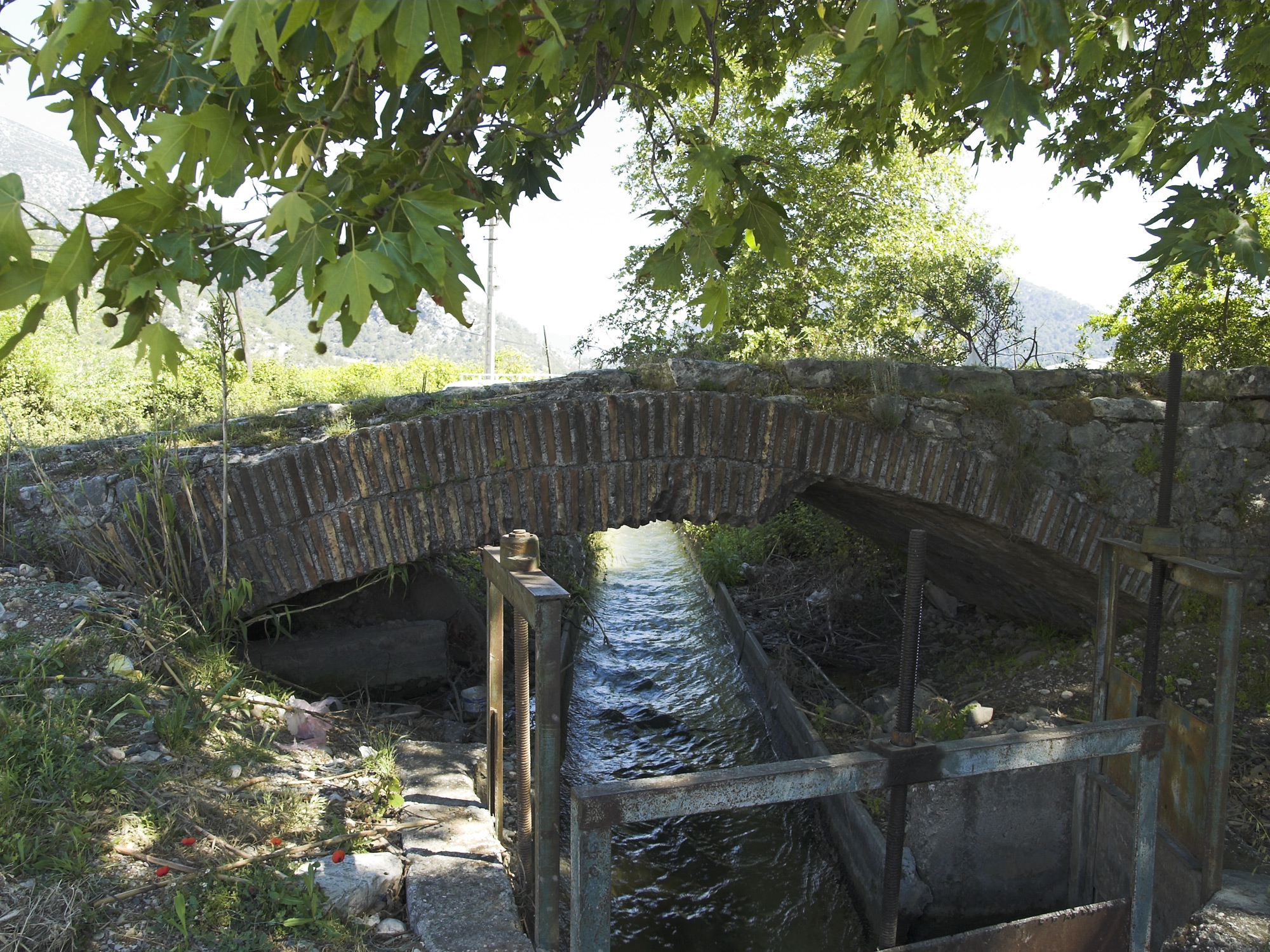
The rather modest Alakır Çayı, flowing under the 1st segmented arch.

The bridge crosses the Alakır Çayı stream, whose ancient name is unknown, 3.2 km (2.0 mi) east of the ruins of Limyra (distance measured from the city's theatre) and 3.8 km (2.4 mi) north of the modern coastline, close to the modern road from Turunçova to Kumluca. The local topography is dominated by the foothills of the Toçak Dağı mountains, which blend here with the alluvial bottomlands of the Bay of Finike. In this transitional area, the bridge was built immediately above the point where the narrow river valley opens into the wide estuary plain, and where the crossing of the river during the rain period would be obstructed by high water. While the eastern end of the bridge levels off at the gravel plain, the western end abuts directly to the rising rock wall of the mountain, presumably for protection against floods. The resulting sharp bend in the course of the road could also be exploited in case of need to block the road. A modern dam, Alakır Barajı, was constructed upstream for irrigation purposes and flood protection.

Lycia did not, in contrast to other Roman provinces, possess a very developed road system. While the north–south traffic was conducted primarily through the few river valleys, the east–west routes led, unlike today, mostly on and along the mountain ridges. This particular road, leading from Limyra over the Alakır Çayı and into the neighbouring region of Pamphylia and Attaleia, must have been of special importance, since the two regions were united in a single province, Lycia et Pamphylia, until the 4th century. In comparison to the main arterial roads of the Roman Empire however, the roads of Lycia were, with 3–4 m (9.8–13.1 ft) width, rather modest and confined to pedestrian and pack animal traffic. This is further corroborated by the fact that no wagon ruts are evident on the paving of the Limyra bridge, nor any traces of a parapet or breastwork.

== Construction ==
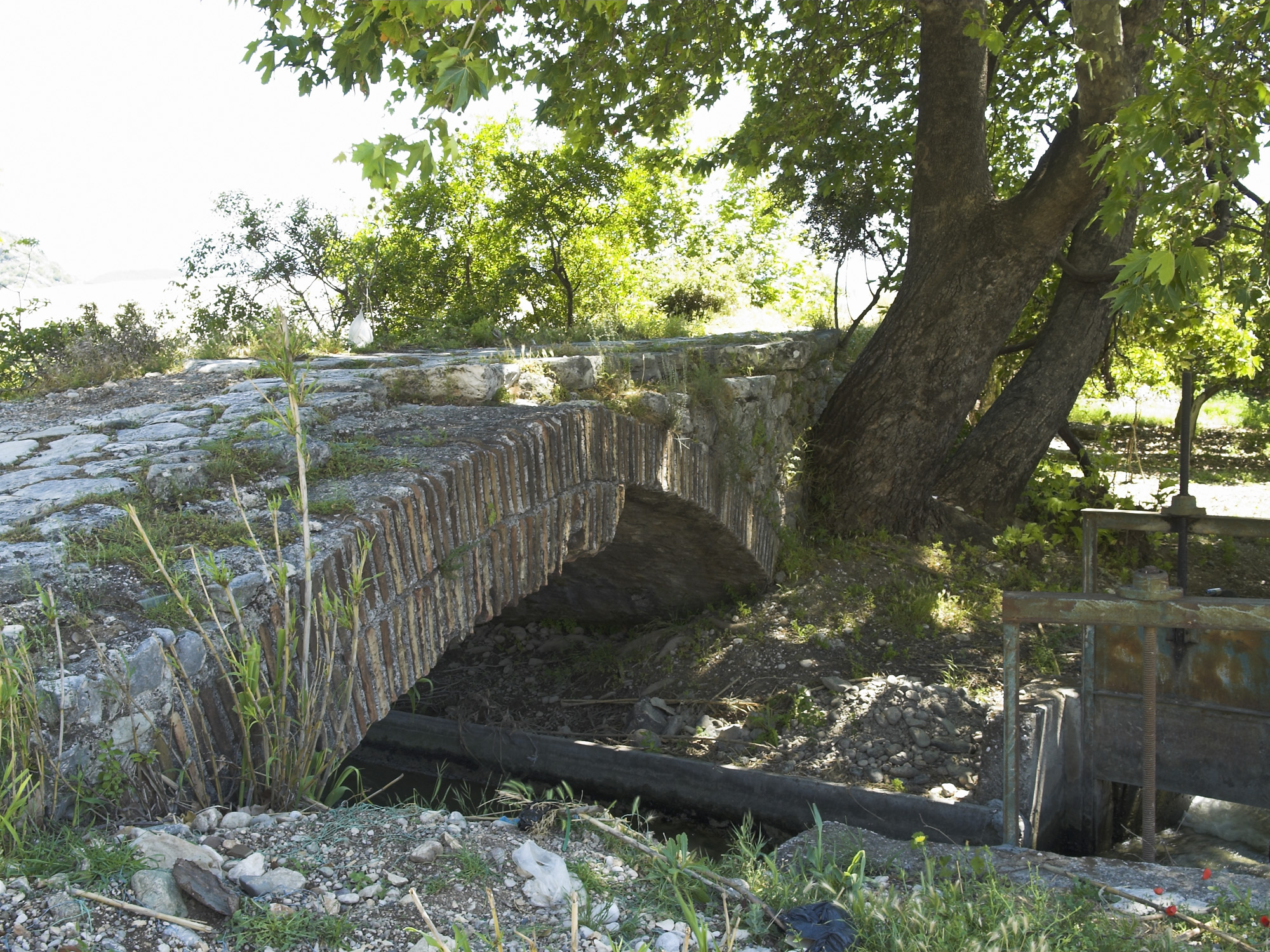
The 1st arch seen from the south.

With a length of 360 m (1,181.1 ft), the Limyra Bridge qualifies as the largest surviving engineering achievement of antiquity in Lycia. The bridge stands on 26 uniform segmental arches consisting of a double, radially laid course of bricks. At the eastern end, the original 27th arch has been replaced by two smaller, semicircular arches of later construction. The latter are built with a single course of bricks. Traces of the original, flat beginning of the collapsed arch are still visible on the piers.

At the time of Wurster's and Ganzert's visit to the site, the entire bridge was buried by river sediments up to the springing line of the vaults. No efforts to dig them up were undertaken by Wurster and Ganzert. Only two of the 28 arches were exposed enough so that direct measurements of the clear span and the pier width could be undertaken. It was, however, possible to calculate the dimensions of the remaining bays from their exposed sections.

=== Architecture ===
==== Arches and piers ====
Dimensions of a typical segmental arch

The spans of the arches ranged from 11.60 m (38.1 ft) to 14.97 m (49.1 ft) (arches 2 and 26 respectively). Based on the size of the spans, one can distinguish four groups, with the following median values:

- 11.60–12.30 m (38.1–40.4 ft) for four arches (Nos. 2, 3, 7, 21)
- 12.75 m (41.8 ft) for fourteen arches (Nos. 5, 9–15, 17–19, 22–24)
- 13.10 m (43.0 ft) for four arches (Nos. 1, 4, 6, 8)
- 13.60 m (44.6 ft) for three arches (Nos. 16, 20, 25)

The reason for this grouping is unclear; they certainly cannot be attributed to an attempt to match the lay of the river bed. The differences however could point to the repeated use of differently-sized falsework structures in the construction of the barrel vaults (see animation below).

Only in a single case, between arches 26 and 27, were Wurster and Ganzert able to determine the breadth of a pier: 2.10 m (6.9 ft). Subtracting this value from the common arch span of 12.75 m (41.8 ft), a clear span of 10.65 m (34.9 ft) remains. Since all arches have a rise of ca. 2 m (6.6 ft), the Limyra Bridge has an unusually large span-to-rise ratio of 5.3 to 1. Such flattened arches were very rare at the time for stone bridges, and were not matched and surpassed until the reappearance of segmental arch bridges in 14th century Italy. For the largest arch in the Limyra Bridge, the ratio is even greater, spanning a width 6.4 times its height. The two later arches, in contrast, are, with a ratio of 2.7:1, quite ordinary semi-circular arches.

==== Height ====
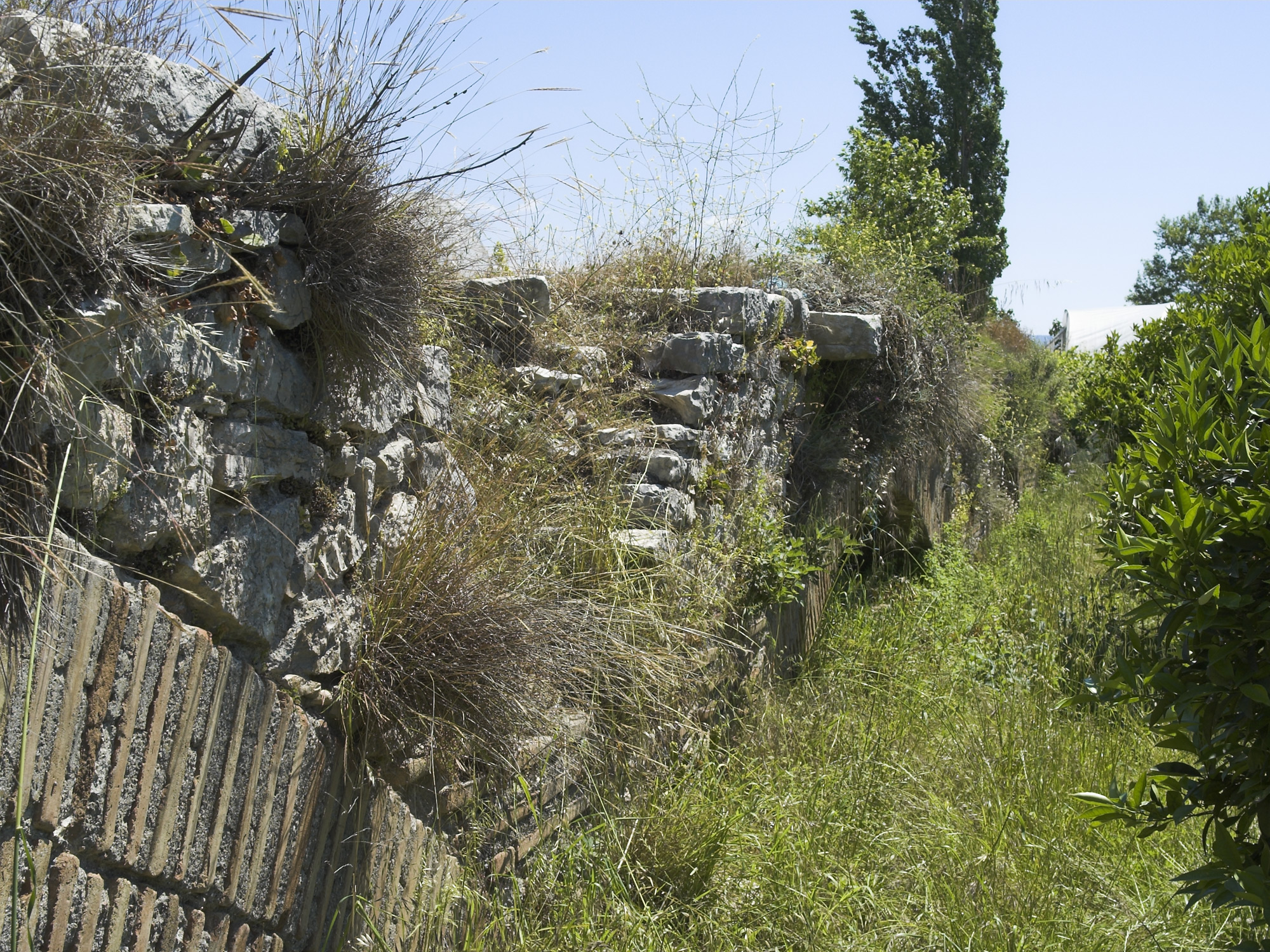
Arches 8 and 9, south side, silted up to the level of the arch abutments.

The total height of the bridge could not be determined because most of the structure is silted up. However, the distance between the arches' abutments and the pavement surface could be determined at only 3.25 m (10.7 ft).

The surface level is almost horizontal: the roadway lies at a height of 20.05–20.55 m (65.8–67.4 ft) above sea level between arches 1 to 20, and falls slightly in its eastern section, between arches 21 and 26 to a level of 19.94 to 19.66 m (65.4 to 64.5 ft). Since there is no indication of a later sinking of the structure, this nearly uniform height indicates careful levelling and the existence of solid pier foundations. In contrast, the lengthwise axis of the bridge displays often significant deviations from arch to arch.

==== Statics ====
Remarkably, the support line of the structure's dead load is almost identical with the curve of the vault arch. The statical analysis of the bridge proves the structure's great load capacity:

In modern classification, the bridge would be able to support loads of a Class 30 bridge (per DIN 1072); this would mean, that it could support a 30-tonne vehicle on one arch and additionally on the remaining surface of the arch a load of 500 kp/m². The bridge was thus very safe for ancient traffic.

=== Materials ===
The Limyra bridge was built in a composite manner of brick, stonemasonry, and rubble.

==== Arches ====
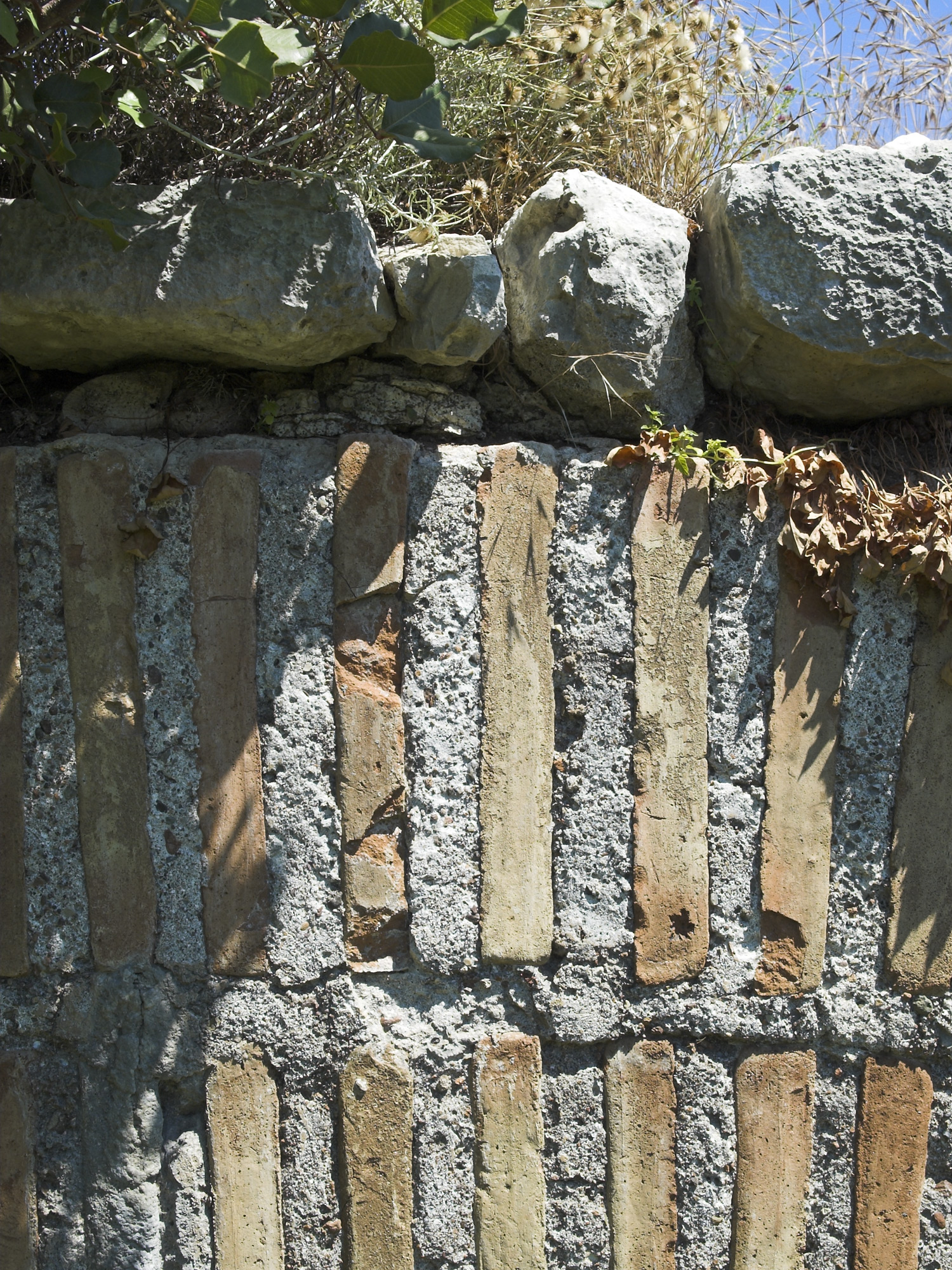
Arch closeup: double layer of bricks bound with mortar.

The bricks of the segmental arches are made of yellow-red clay, mixed with fine brick fragments. The bricks are rectangular plates, measuring ca. 40 cm × 50 cm (15.7 in × 19.7 in) and 5 cm (2.0 in) thick. They are placed with the shorter side upright facing outwards, so that the total thickness of the arches measures ca. 80 cm. The bricks are bound with grout of lime mortar mixed with brick shards and fine gravel, forming 4 cm-thick (1.6 in) joints. The two later semi-circular arches were built with smaller bricks, although surviving bricks from the original arch were re-used at places. The abutment stones are dressed limestone ashlar blocks, and form a sloping surface to support the arches.

The double-layer technique facilitated a more effective use of the falsework, since they could be removed and used elsewhere as soon as the lower course was finished:

The construction of the two layers of the double brick-arches in two separate phases had two advantages. In the first phase, the falsework only had to carry the weight of the lower course, so that it could itself be of lighter construction. In the second phase, the weight of the upper layer could be already borne by the lower vault; the falsework was thus already available for use in a different arch.

Hypothetical workflow on the bridge: the falsework was moved to another opening as soon as the lower arch rib had been completed.

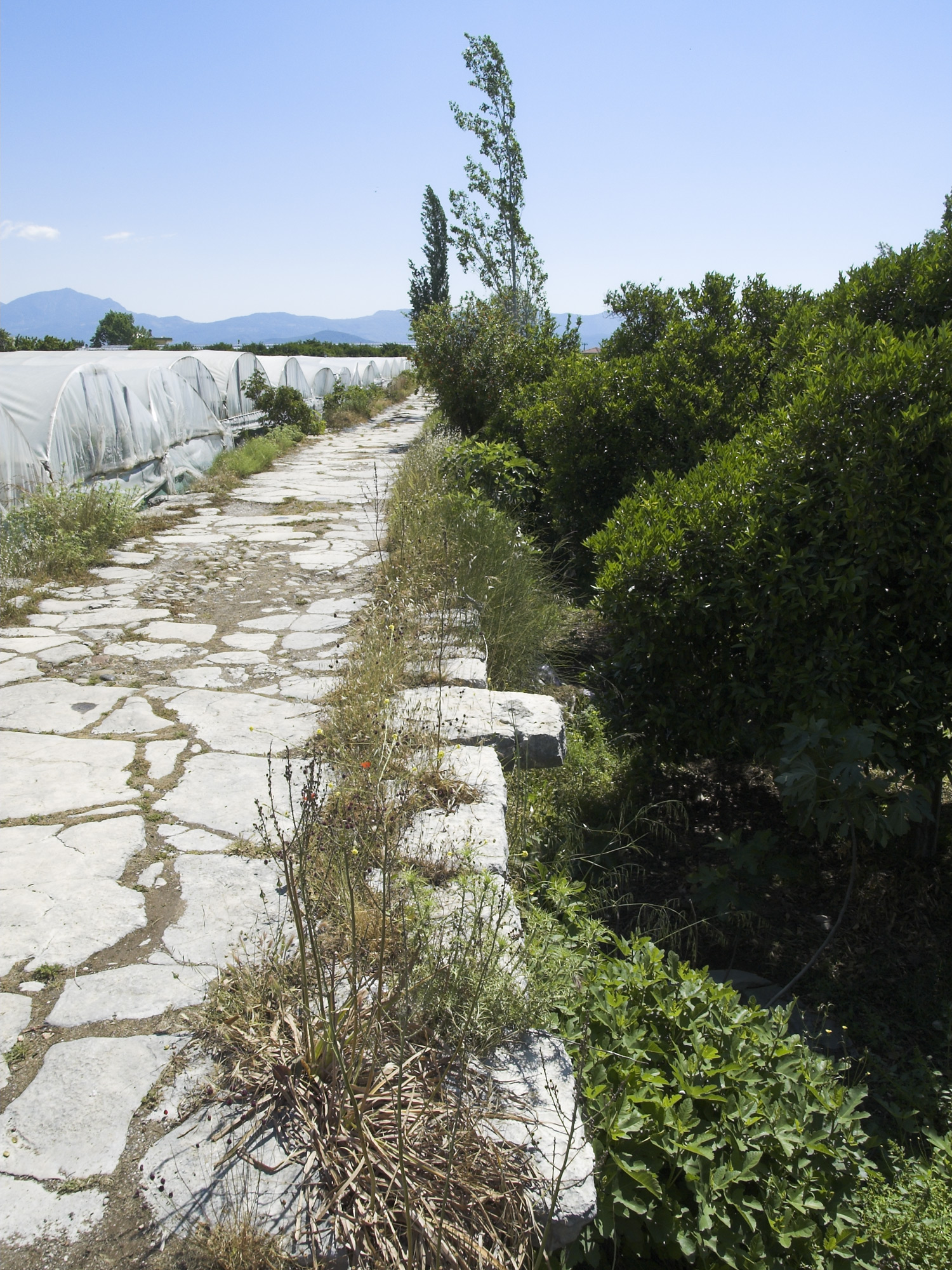
Pavement with projecting corbel stone at the 3rd arch, south side

==== Superstructure ====
As far as can be determined, between arches 2 to 21, the outer facing of the superstructure consists of four layers of brick, followed by layers of rough stonemasonry bound with mortar. In contrast, between arches 22 and 26, as well as in both ramps on either end, the facing consists of ashlar blocks. The two repaired arches 27a and 27b are differentiated from the earlier work through the use of smaller unworked stones and the incorporation of irregularly placed brick tiles. In arch 26, the lower side of the arch still features a projecting bearing used for the placement of the falsework.

The interior of the superstructure consists of a combination of unworked masonry blocks and large river boulders, bound with lime mortar.

==== Pavement ====
The bridge surface is located only 30–40 cm (11.8–15.7 in) over the arches' apex, is 3.55–3.70 m (11.6–12.1 ft) wide, increasing towards either end at 4.30 m (14.1 ft) and projects ca. 10 cm (3.9 in) over the superstructure on either side. It is paved with large and irregular limestone cobblestones, although smaller pebbles have been used in the repairs at the two semicircular arches.

== Dating ==
The exact chronological placement of the Limyra bridge is difficult due to its unique place within Roman engineering tradition and the lack of comparable structures. Wurster and Ganzert used following characteristics as a starting point:

- multiple arches of same width, and horizontal deck level with only small-gradient ramps on either end
- very flat segmental arches built with double, radially layered brick courses
- the use of mortar in the stonework
- exterior facing primarily rough masonry with interspersed bricks, partly dressed ashlar blocks
- exceptionally large paving stones.

In contrast to these, most Roman stone bridges were faced with ashlar and rested on voussoir arches, a method which is dominant in other vaulted structures in Lycia too. Compared to the massive and tall semicircular-arched bridges that are typical of Roman architecture, the Limyra bridge, with its flat segmented arches, offers a markedly lower and more elongated appearance, so that Wurster and Ganzert offer a "provisional" late dating, approximately during the reign of emperor Justinian I in the 6th century, during which the use of mixed brick and stone is attested in other structures of the region.

On the other hand, this mixed technique is already present in the 3rd-century AD aqueduct of Aspendos, and the Romans certainly knew how to build segmented-arched bridges, as attested by surviving examples, three of which are listed by Wurster and Ganzert themselves. An earlier construction date in the 2nd or 3rd centuries AD cannot therefore be excluded. The case for an earlier construction date has been strengthened in recent years with the discovery of further seven Roman segmented arch bridges. The remnants of the nearby Kemer Bridge over the river Xanthos, which dates to the 3rd century and has some architectural similarities with the Limyra bridge, could further reinforce that case.

== See also ==
- List of Roman bridges

== Sources ==
- O’Connor, Colin (1993), Roman Bridges, Cambridge University Press, pp. 126 (E23), ISBN 0-521-39326-4
- Wurster, Wolfgang W.; Ganzert, Joachim (1978), "Eine Brücke bei Limyra in Lykien" [A bridge at Limyra in Lycia], Archäologischer Anzeiger (in German), Berlin: German Archaeological Institute, pp. 288–307, ISSN 0003-8105
