= Gökbük, Finike =

Gökbük
- Neighbourhood
- Location in Turkey
- Coordinates: 36°27′N 30°07′E
- Country: Turkey
- Province: Antalya
- District: Finike
- Population (2022): 3,906
- Time zone: UTC+3 (TRT)

Gökbük is a neighbourhood in the municipality and district of Finike, Antalya Province, Turkey. Its population is 396 (2022). The village is inhabited by Tahtacı.
