= Alacadağ, Finike =

Alacadağ
- Neighbourhood
- Location in Turkey
- Coordinates: 36°24′N 30°04′E
- Country: Turkey
- Province: Antalya
- District: Finike
- Population (2022): 164
- Time zone: UTC+3 (TRT)

Alacadağ is a neighbourhood in the municipality and district of Finike, Antalya Province, Turkey. Its population is 164 (2022).
