= Hasyurt, Finike =

Hasyurt
- Neighbourhood
- Location in Turkey
- Coordinates: 36°19′N 30°13′E
- Country: Turkey
- Province: Antalya
- District: Finike
- Population (2022): 5,751
- Time zone: UTC+3 (TRT)

Hasyurt is a neighbourhood in the municipality and district of Finike, Antalya Province, Turkey. Its population is 5,751 (2022). Before the 2013 reorganisation, it was a town (belde).
