= Boldağ, Finike =

Boldağ
- Neighbourhood
- Location in Turkey
- Coordinates: 36°17′N 30°08′E
- Country: Turkey
- Province: Antalya
- District: Finike
- Population (2022): 162
- Time zone: UTC+3 (TRT)

Boldağ is a neighbourhood in the municipality and district of Finike, Antalya Province, Turkey. Its population is 162 (2022).
