= Yazır, Finike =

Yazır
- Neighbourhood
- Location in Turkey
- Coordinates: 36.4756°N 29.9719°E
- Country: Turkey
- Province: Antalya
- District: Finike
- Population (2022): 324
- Time zone: UTC+3 (TRT)

Yazır is a neighbourhood in the municipality and district of Finike, Antalya Province, Turkey. Its population is 324 (2022).
