= Yuvalı, Finike =

Yuvalı
- Neighbourhood
- Location in Turkey
- Coordinates: 36°21′N 30°10′E
- Country: Turkey
- Province: Antalya
- District: Finike
- Population (2022): 2,512
- Time zone: UTC+3 (TRT)

Yuvalı is a neighbourhood in the municipality and district of Finike, Antalya Province, Turkey. Its population is 2,512 (2022).
