= Arycanda =

Ancient settlement in Anatolia

- Ἀρύκανδα (Ancient Greek)
- Arykanda
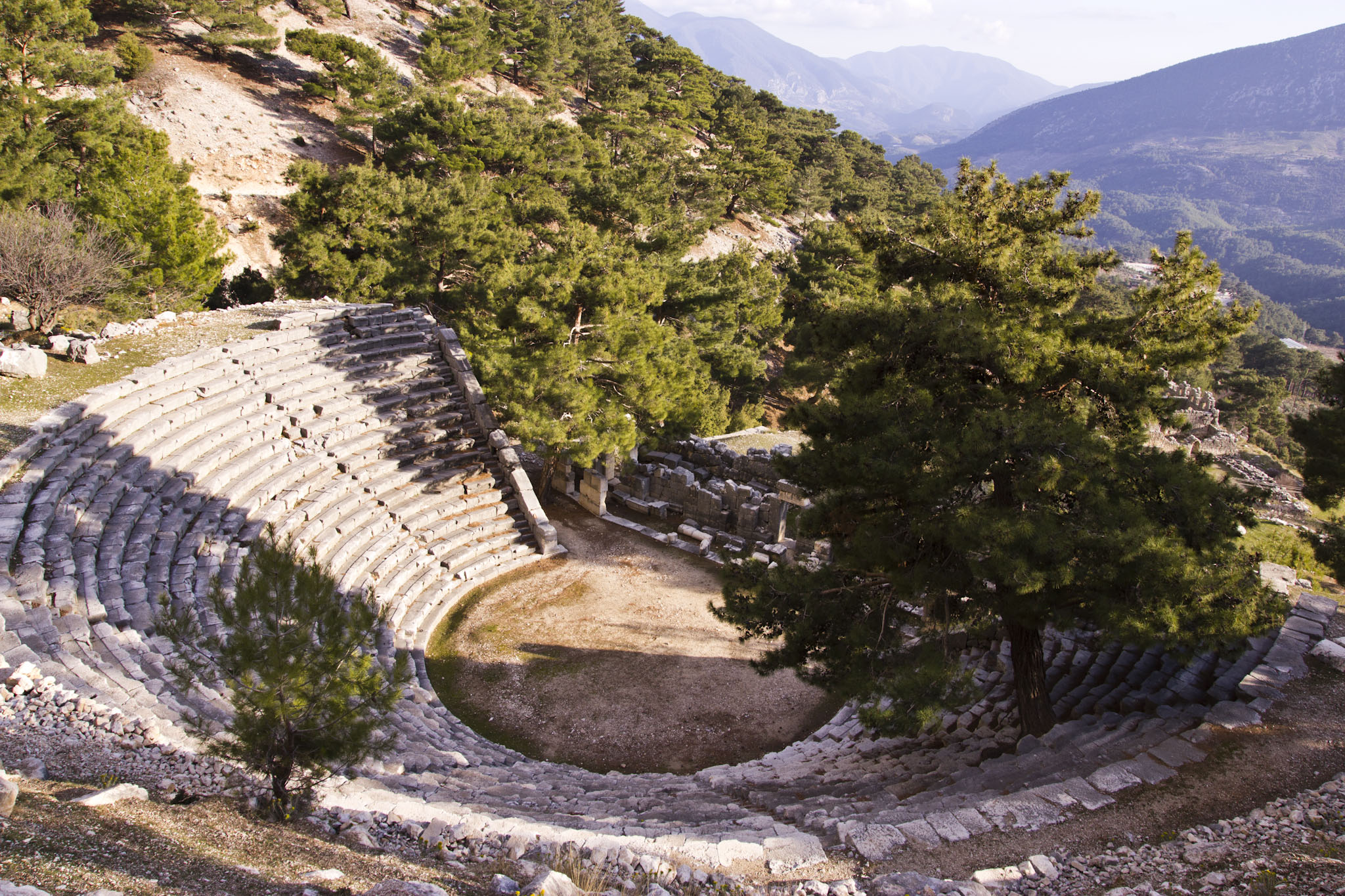
- The Theatre

- Location within Turkey
- 36°30′50″N 30°03′36″E
- Type: Settlement
- Location: Aykiriçay, Antalya Province, Turkey
- Region: Lycia

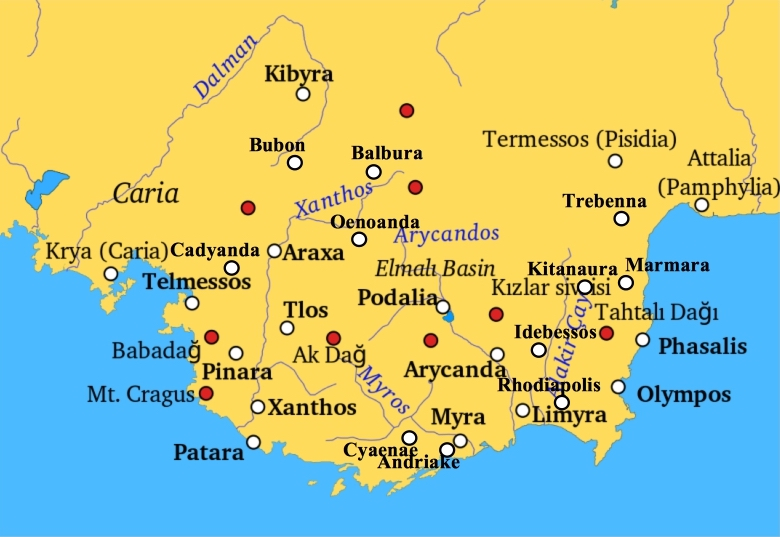
Cities of ancient Lycia. Red dots: mountain peaks, white dots: ancient cities

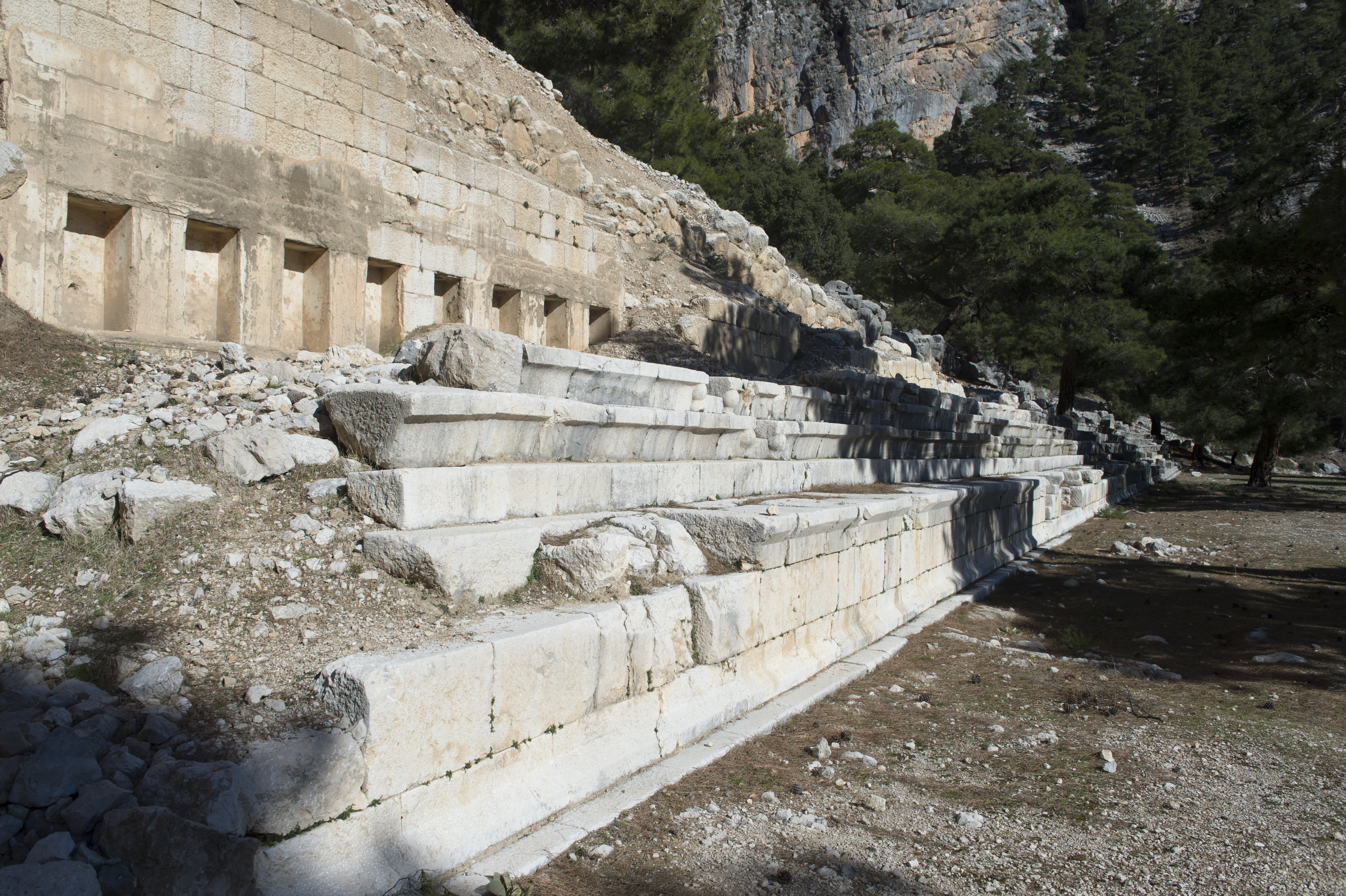
Stadium

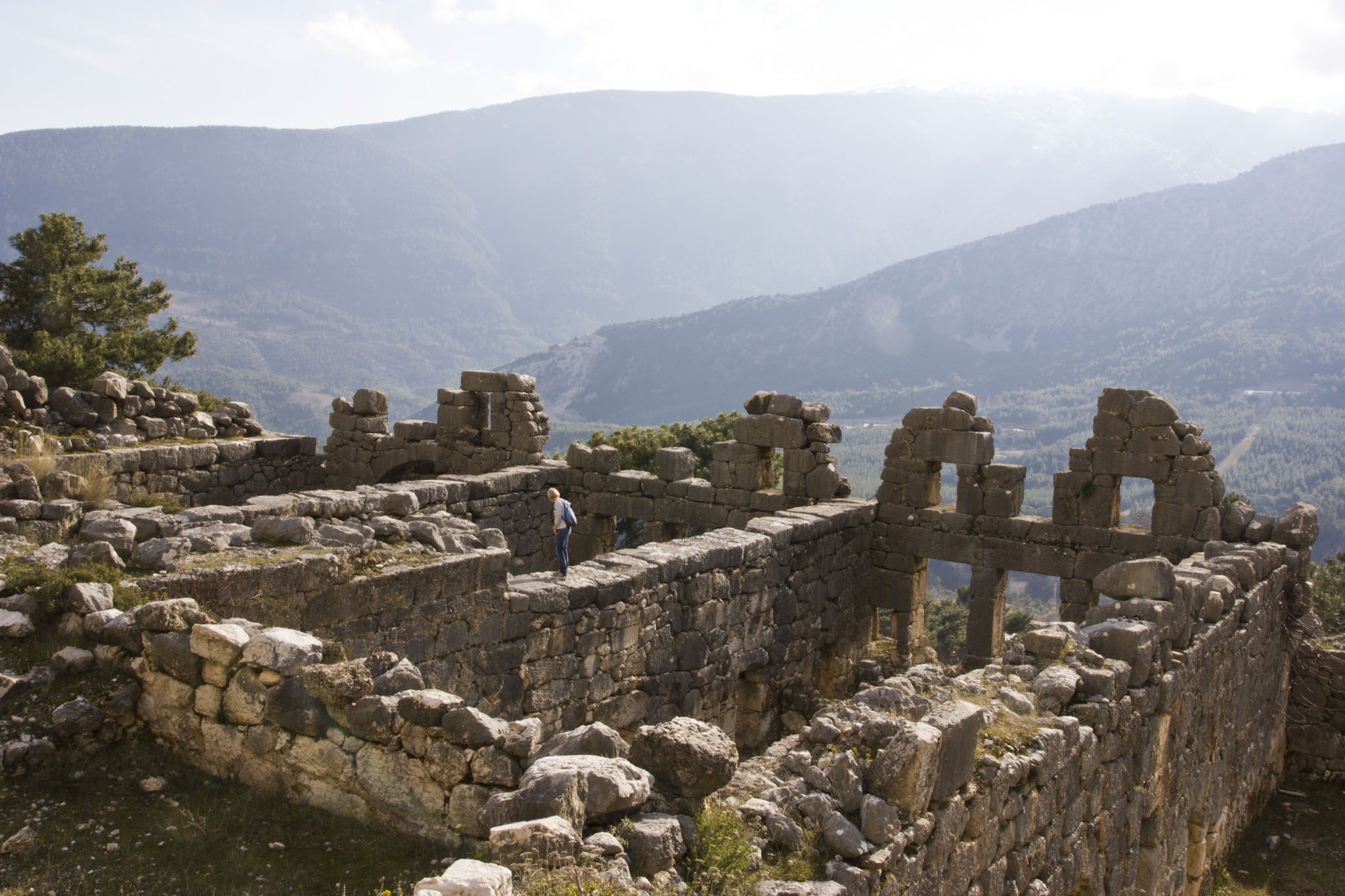
Great Baths

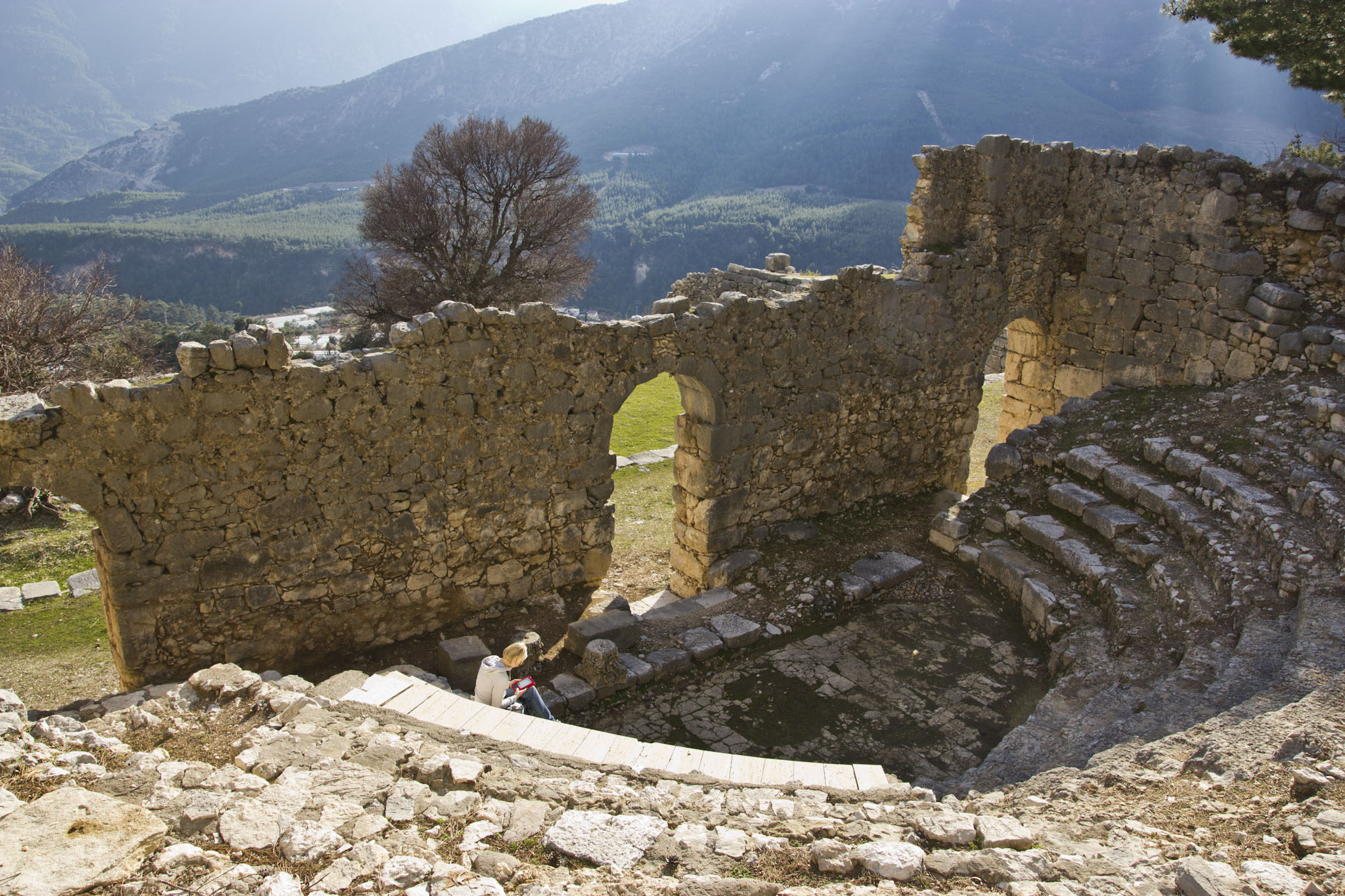
Odeon

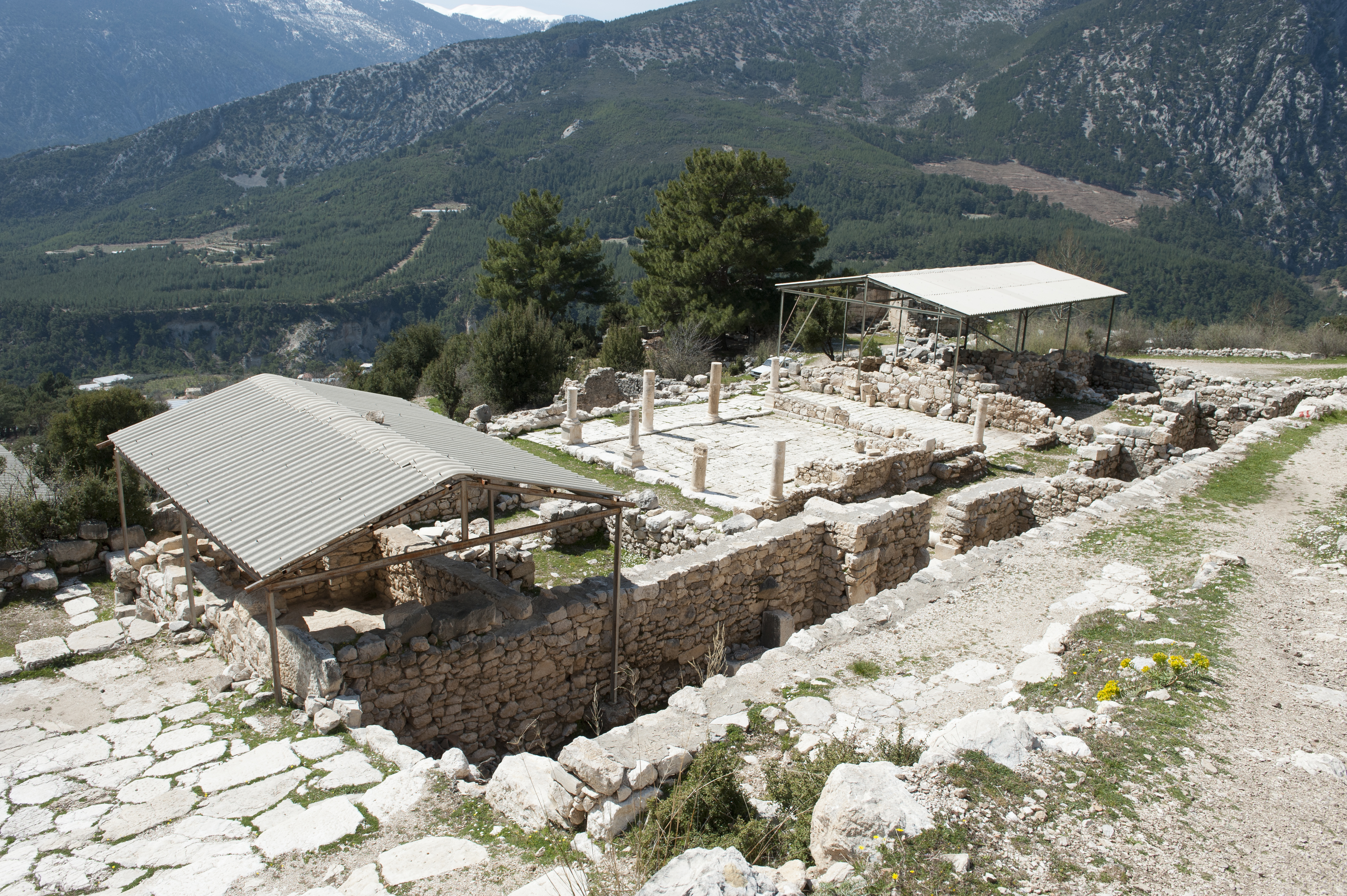
Peristyle house

Arycanda or Arykanda (Ancient Greek: Ἀρύκανδα or Ἀρυκάνδα) is an Ancient Lycian city, former bishopric and present Catholic titular see in Antalya Province in the Mediterranean Region of Turkey.

Arykanda was a rich but remote city built upon five large terraces high on a mountain slope, today located near the small modern village of Aykiriçay on the Elmalı-Finike road.

The excellent state of preservation is due to its remote location and the city's early abandonment. The site has been partly excavated and restored by an Ankara University team.

== History ==
=== Late Bronze ===
Arycanda is known to be one of the old Lycian cities, as its name ends with -anda, indicative of its Anatolian origin; dating as far back as the 2nd millennium BC.

=== Iron Age ===
The oldest remains and finds from the city date from the 6th or 5th century BC. Archaeological evidence suggests it became a town in the third century BC, when it gained typically Greek monuments including an agora, bouleuterion, a small stadium, temples and eventually a beautiful theatre.

=== Roman period ===
The city was at its most prosperous in the Roman period. Its wealth is thought to have come from passing trade and timber from the nearby forests. It had no city walls to defend it, only a single watchtower at the highest point of the town being a potentially defensive feature.

It was severely damaged by an earthquake in the 3rd century AD after which it was partially abandoned, although parts survived and prospered. Early Christian basilicas were built through to Byzantine times of the 6th century when the settlement moved to a new site south of the modern road called Arif (or Aruf) in archaeological literature (to distinguish it from the older site).

=== Sights ===
The Acropolis houses Hellenistic and older remains of the site which include the temple of Helios, bouleuterion, prytaneion, upper agora with its shops, and several excavated houses.

The lower city houses most of the Roman remains. These include:

- 7 bath houses of various sizes. A monumental bath complex on the lowest terrace, still virtually intact in its sequence of arches, is in the same complex as the gymnasium. The baths may have been a centre of attraction for tourists from the coast who came to the city to cool off, as the population was too small for so many baths.
- An aqueduct fed the baths with water from mount Bey Dag
- Lower Agora, some of the shops in its eastern part can still be seen. It is wide and flat, located to the south of the odeon and was enclosed on three sides by a portico. At its middle are the remains of Tyche Temple.
- A theatre, in excellent condition, built during the 1st century BC. It has 20 rows of seats, divided into 7 sections. At the edge of every row are holes that were used to support protective awnings.
- Odeon - 2nd century AD. The main entrance is to the south, through a triple portal. This was once a very ornate building, the interior was lined with orthostats and the walls, orchestra and seats were once covered with coloured marble. A block that was discovered (and now housed in Antalya Archaeological Museum) during the excavations over the portal bears a portrait of the Emperor Hadrian.
- A stadium, from the Hellenistic period, that resides above the theatre, in the form of a running track with seats built only on one side. It is smaller than a usual stadium, measuring 106 m. long and 17 m. wide.
- a temple dedicated to deified Emperor Trajan
- Two necropoleis. The one on the entrance to the site is very interesting with its series of richly decorated funerary monuments. The eastern necropolis has barrel-vaulted monumental tombs, temple-tombs and sarcophagi and the western necropolis has rock-cut tombs and barrel-vaulted tombs.

At least 4 late rich Roman houses have been found in the ancient city whose owners were privileged people. In 2017 a prestigious Roman house overlooking the city with eight large rooms and dating from the 5th c. AD was discovered which was destroyed by a fire in 435. It includes a private bath and also a commercial public bath open to paying customers. There was also a pool in the courtyard with a view. The name of the owner, Pierus, was found on a floor mosaic.

== Ecclesiastical history ==
=== Former diocese ===
Since it was in the Roman province of Lycia, the bishopric of Arneae was a suffragan of the metropolitan see of Myra, the province's capital. The Second Council of Nicaea (787) were signed on behalf of the absent bishop of Arycanda by his deacon Petrus. Another bishop of Arycanda, Theodorus, took part in the Photian Council of Constantinople (879).

=== Titular see ===
No longer a residential bishopric, Arycanda is today listed by the Catholic Church as a titular see.

It is presently vacant, having had the following incumbents since the diocese was nominally restored in 1921, under the name Aucanda/Ascanda until 1925, all of the lowest (episcopal) rank :

- Sotero Redondo Herrero, Augustinian Order (O.E.S.A.) (1921.06.16 – 1935.02.24)
- Anunciado Serafini (1935.05.11 – 1939.06.20)
- Jean Larregain (甘有為), Paris Foreign Missions Society (M.E.P.) (1939.06.13 – 1942.05.02)
- Joseph Martin Nathan (1943.04.17 – 1947.01.30)
- Antônio Maria Alves de Siqueira (1947.05.10 – 1957.07.19) (later Archbishop)
- Francisco Ferreira Arreola (1957.12.21 – 1960.08.01)
- Benito Epifanio Rodríguez (1960.09.23 – 2001.02.15)

== Gallery ==
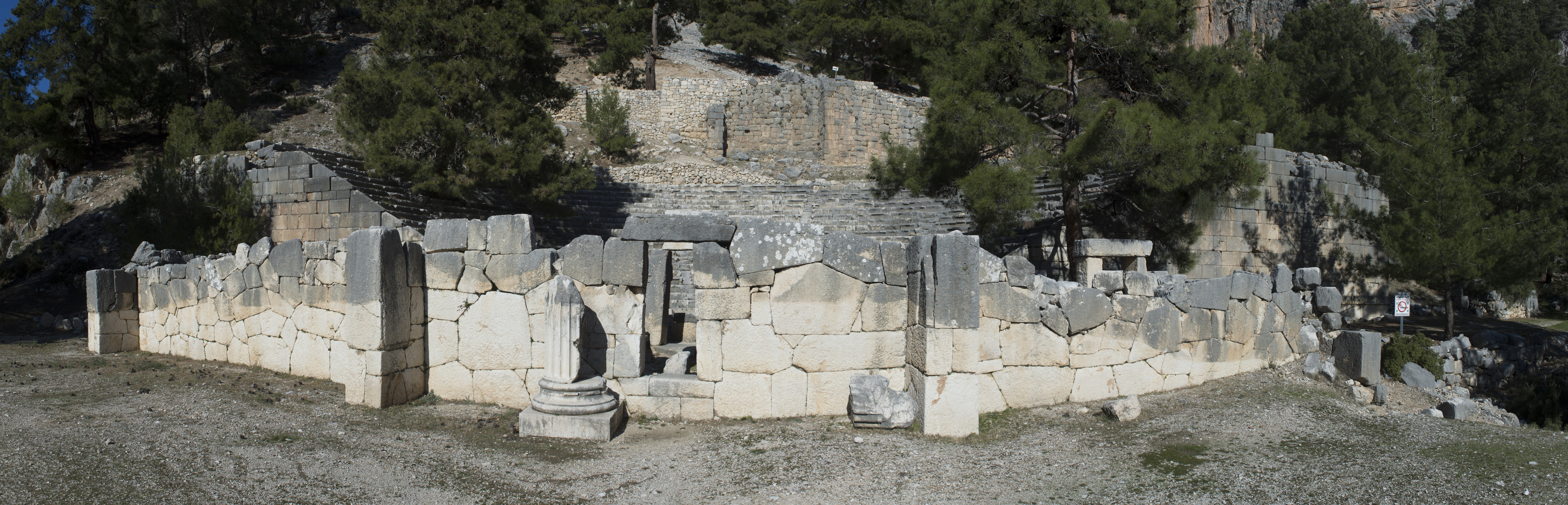
Arycanda Theatre panorama

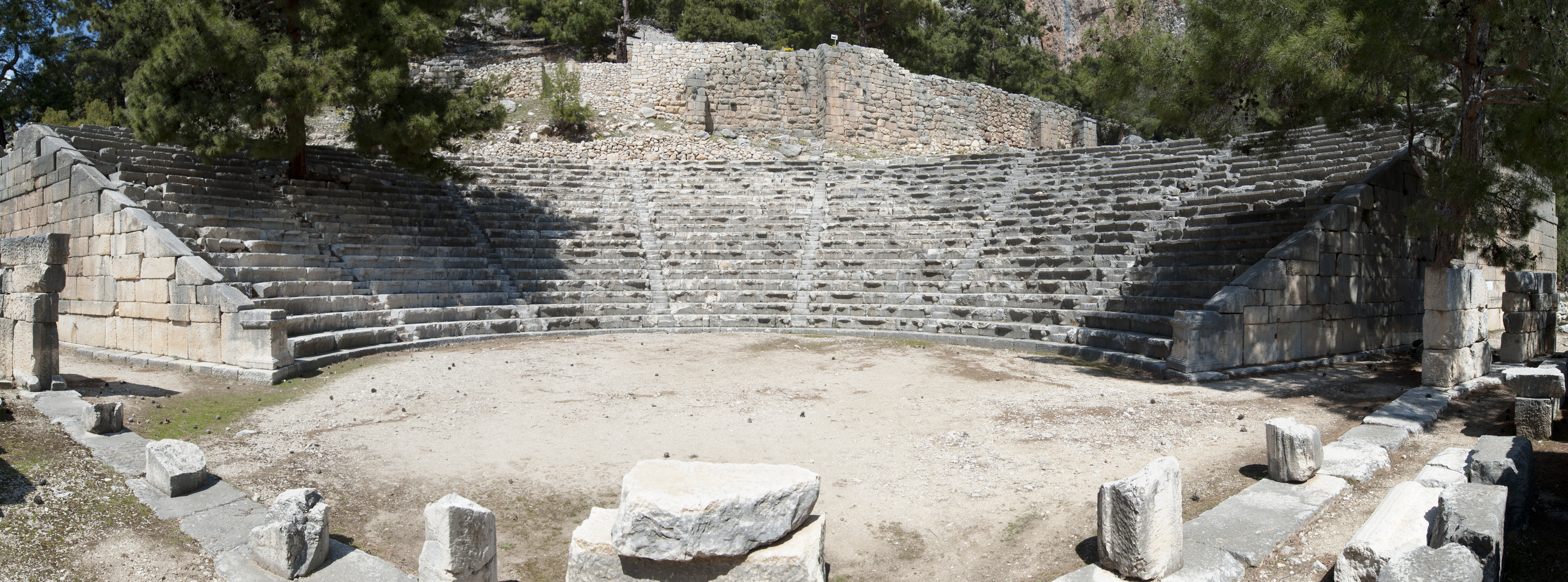
Arycanda Theatre panorama

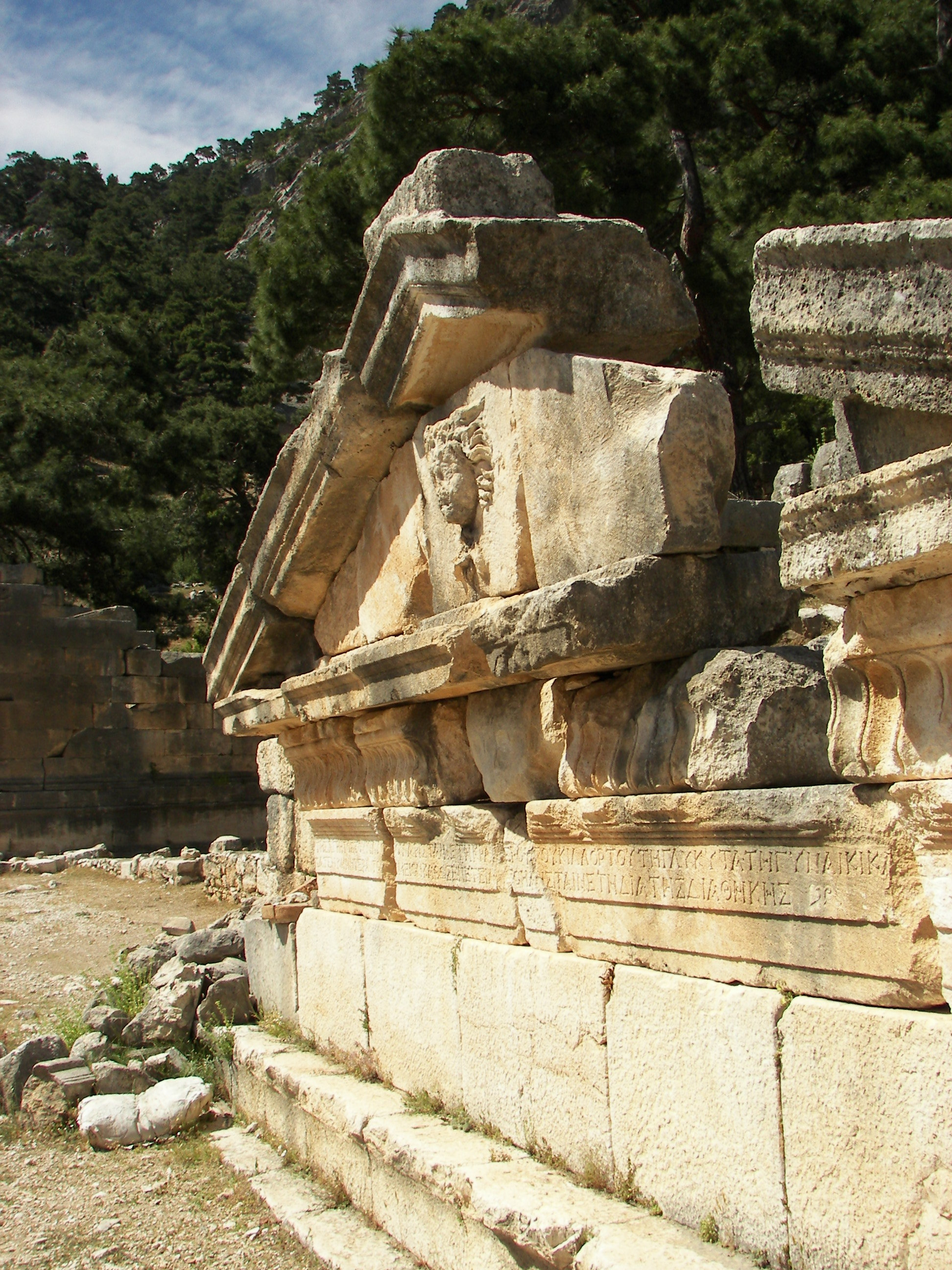
Grave decorated with a gorgon head

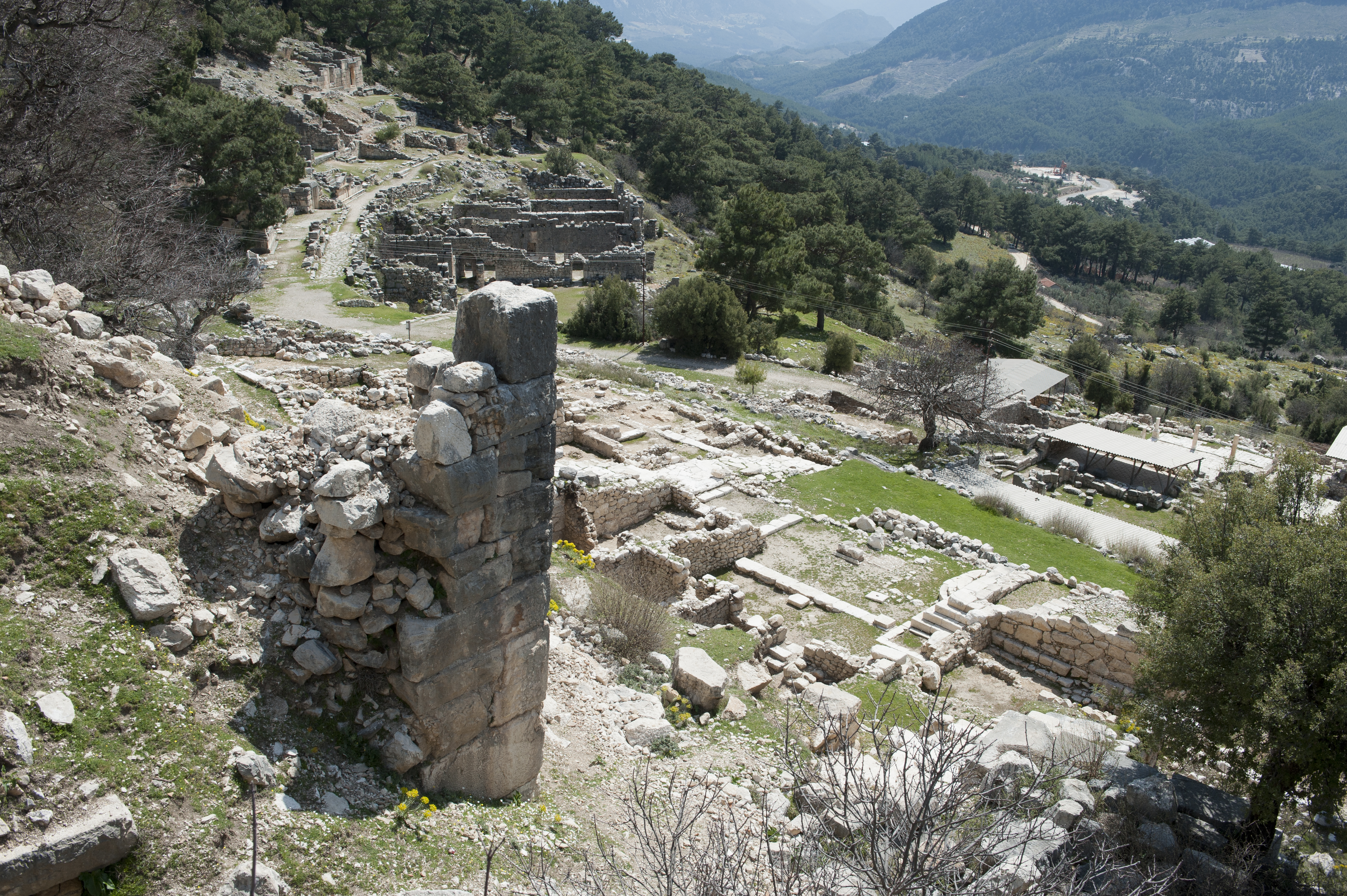
Arykanda general view

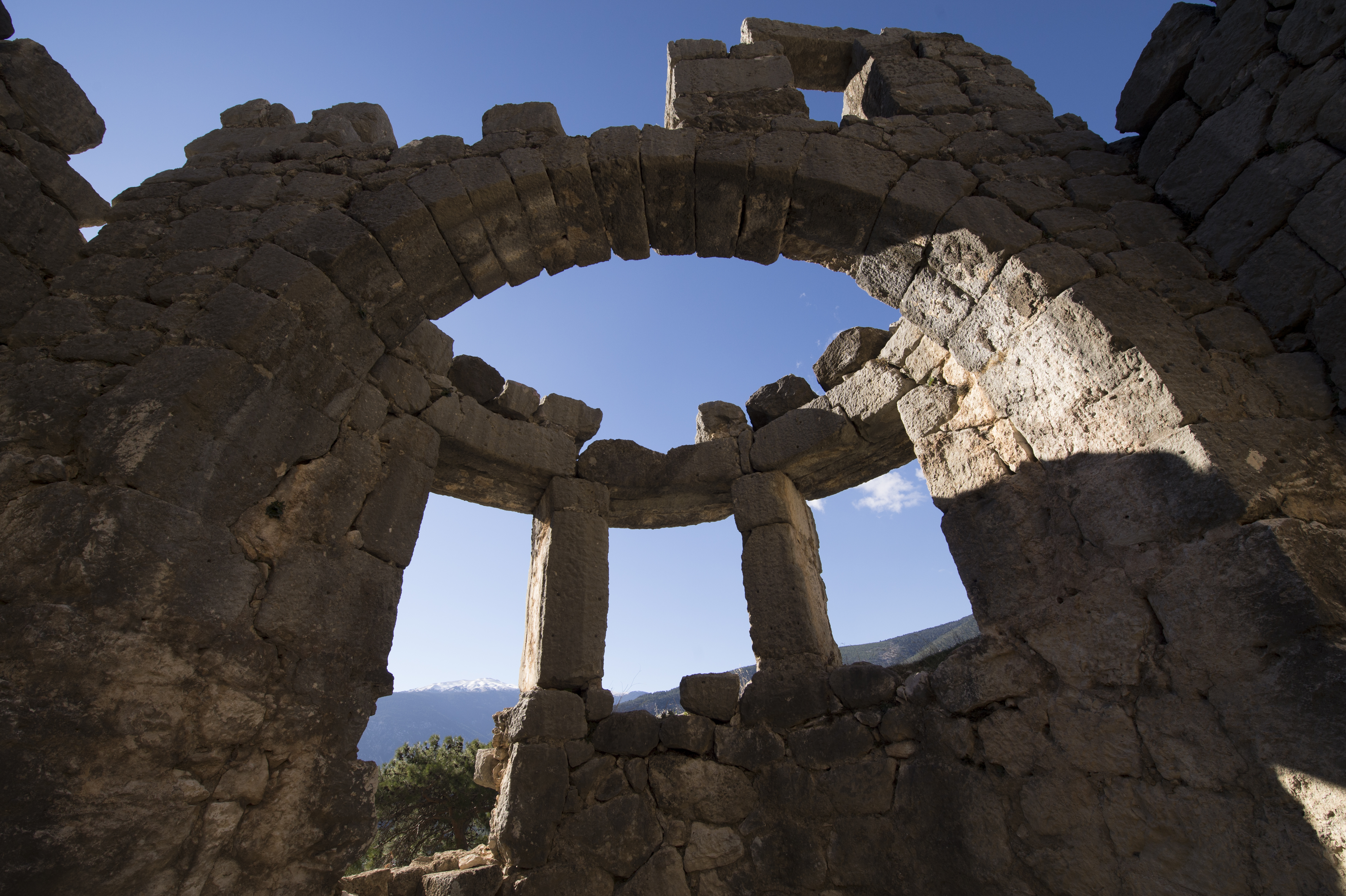
Arycanda from within bath

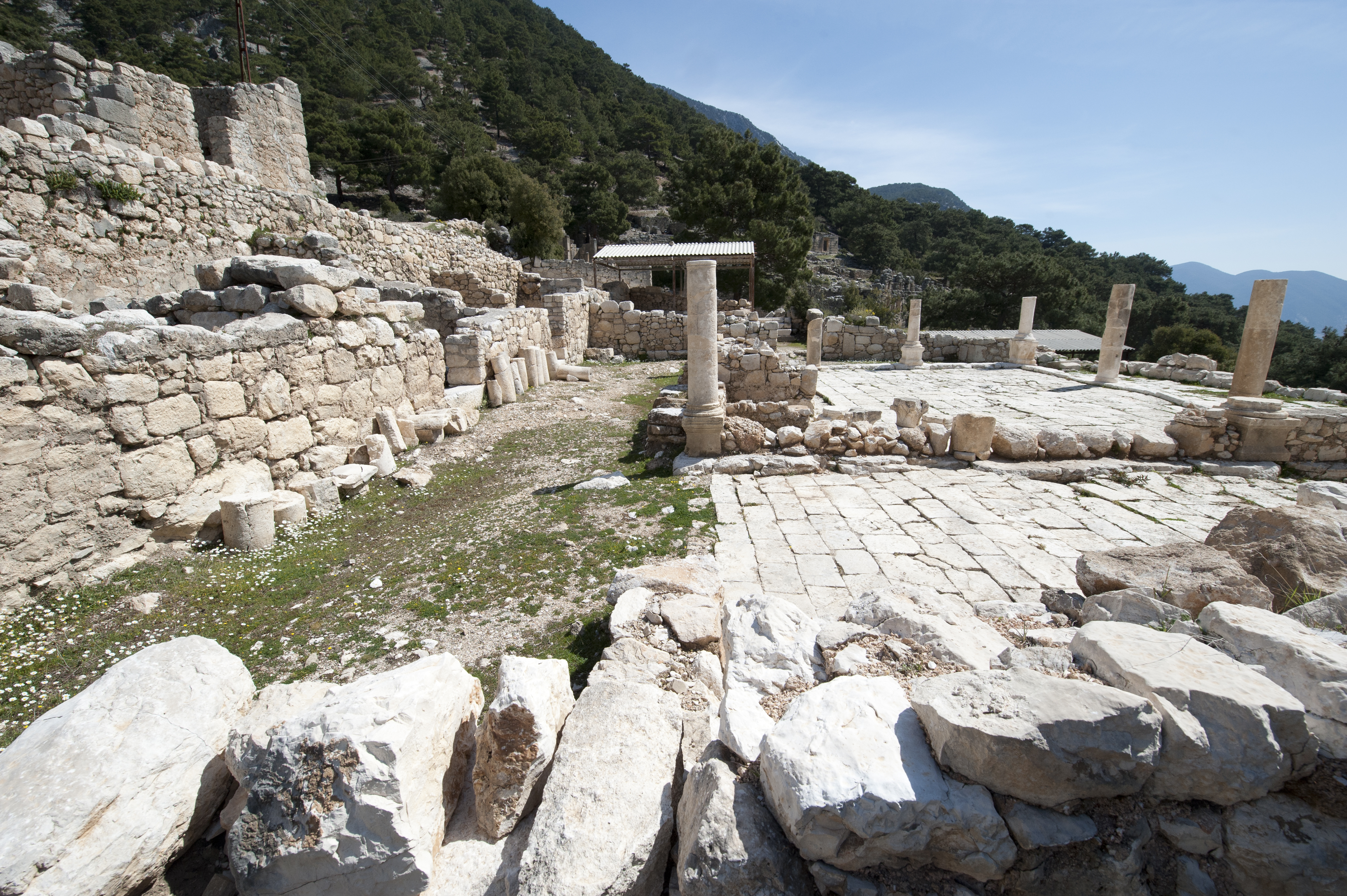
Arycanda Peristyle house

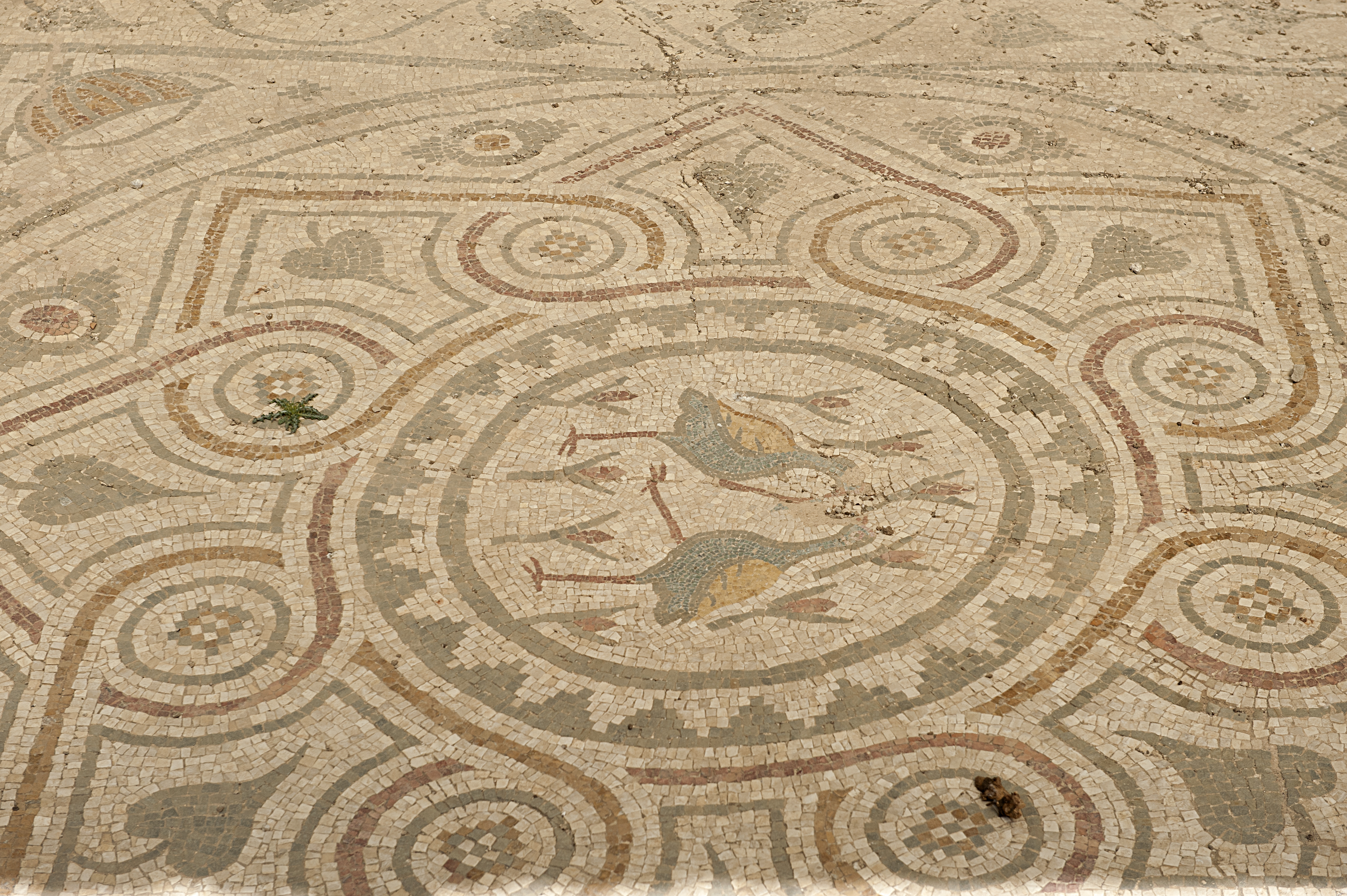
Arykanda Peristyle house mosaic

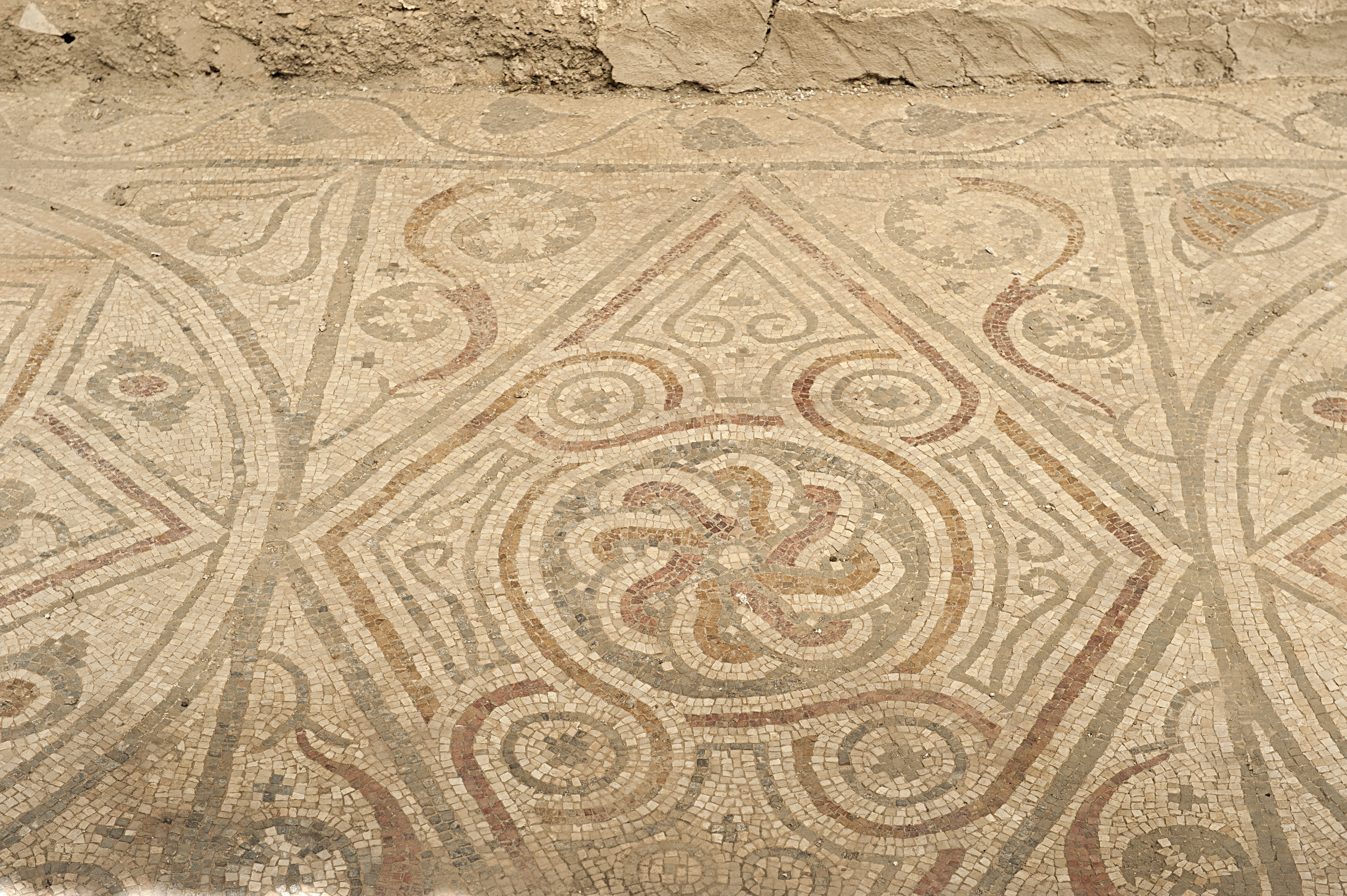
Arykanda Peristyle house mosaic

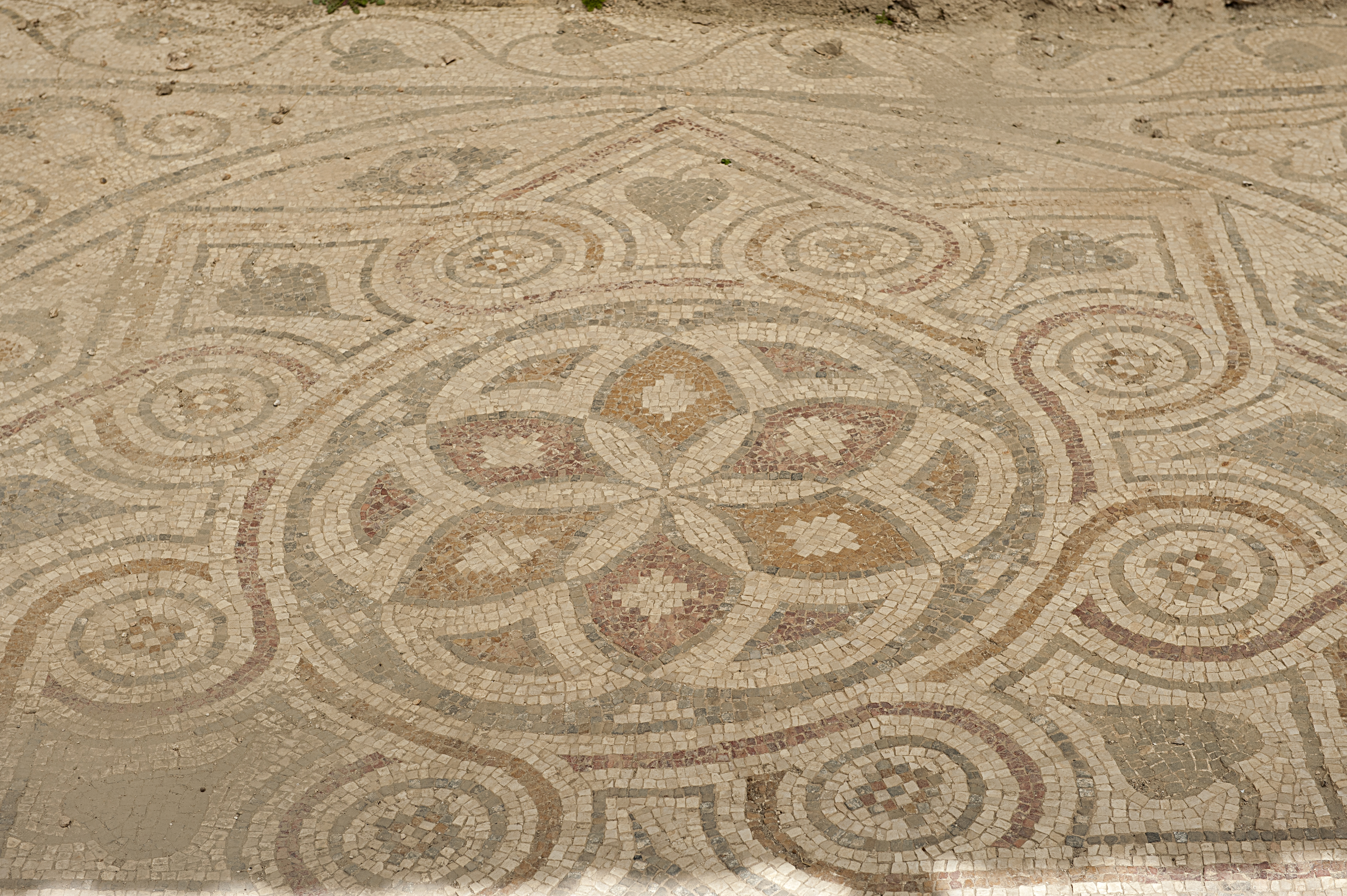
Arykanda Peristyle house mosaic

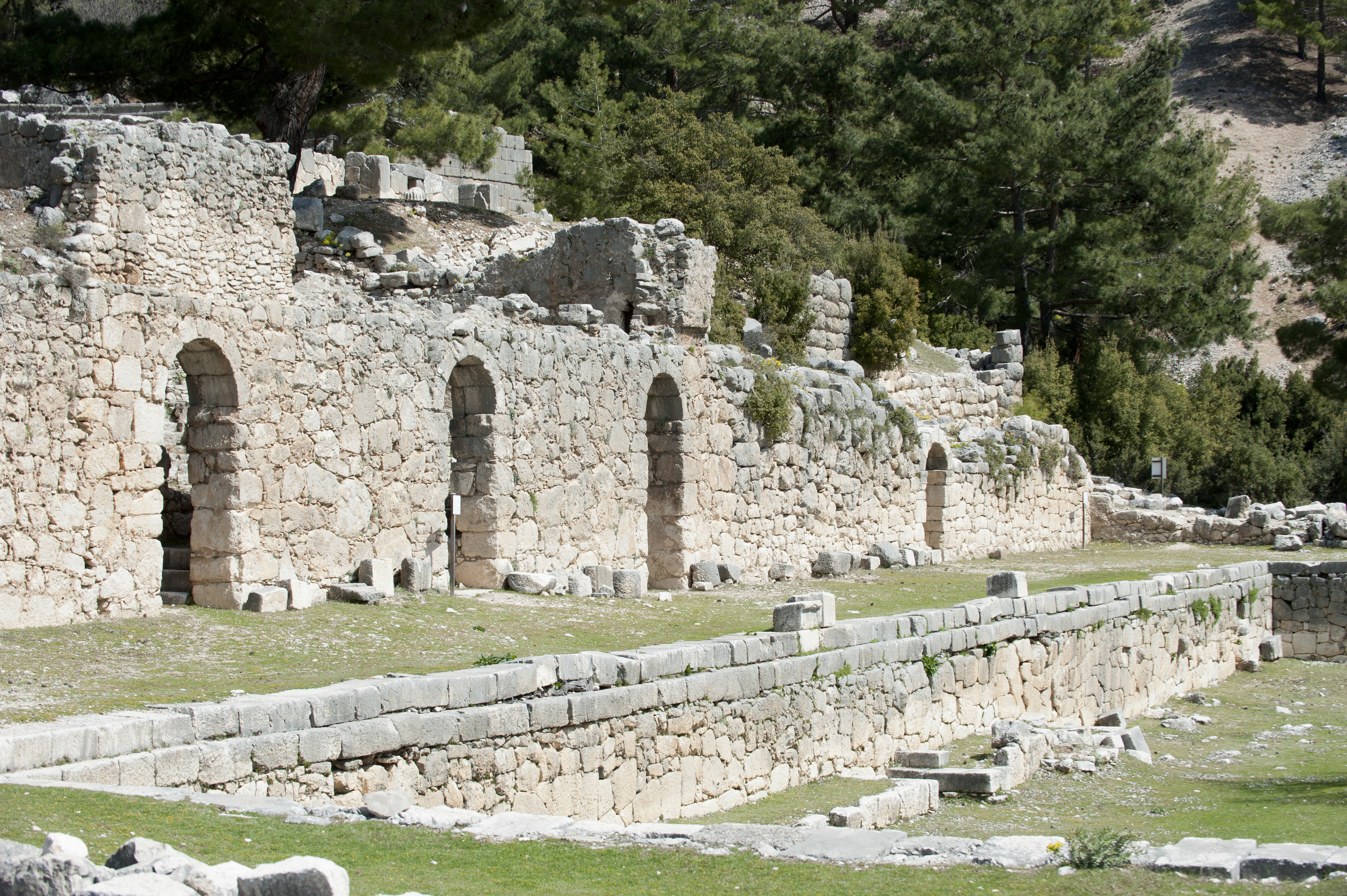
Arykanda State agora

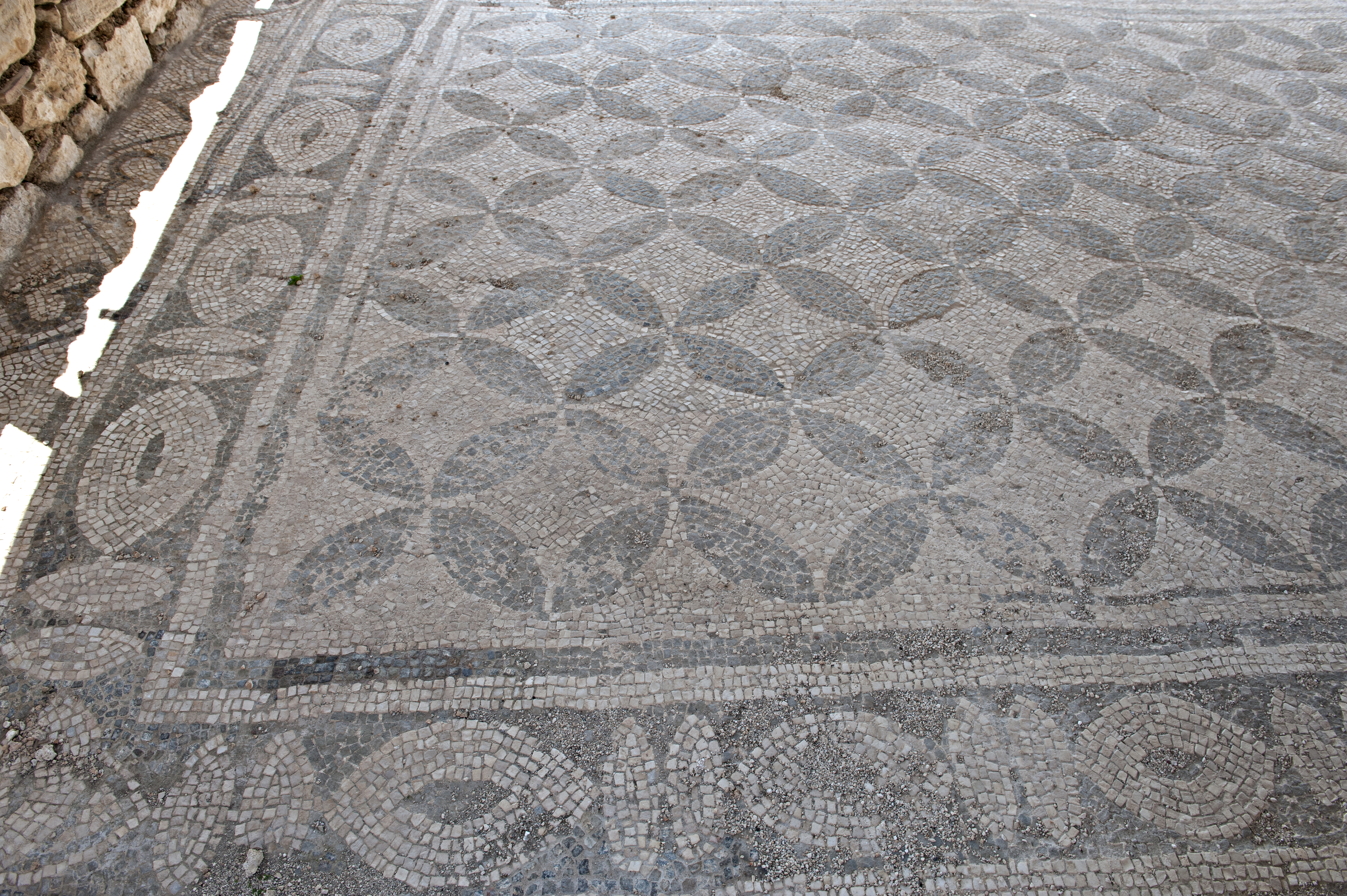
Arykanda Basilica mosaic

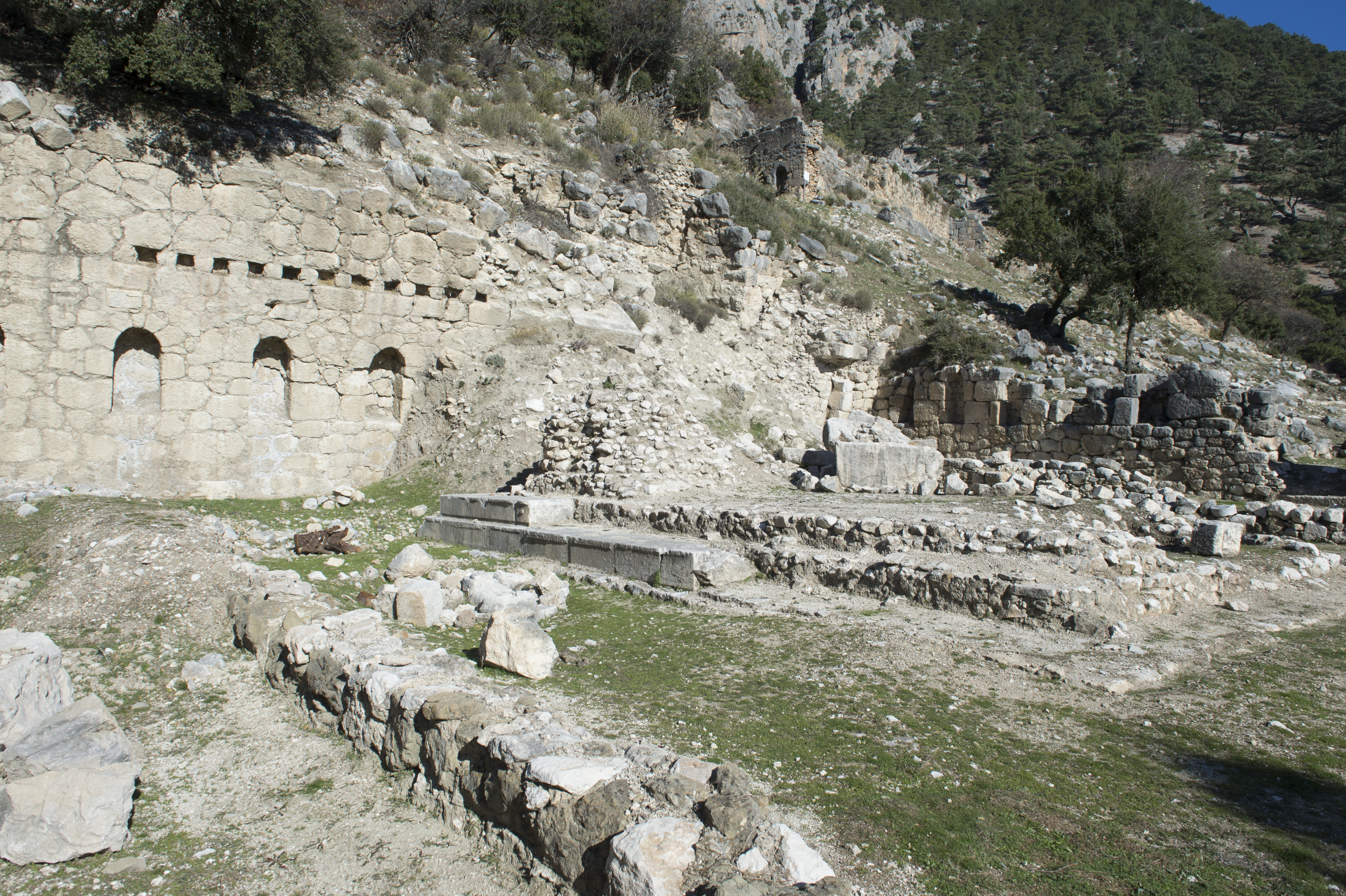
Arycanda Traianeum

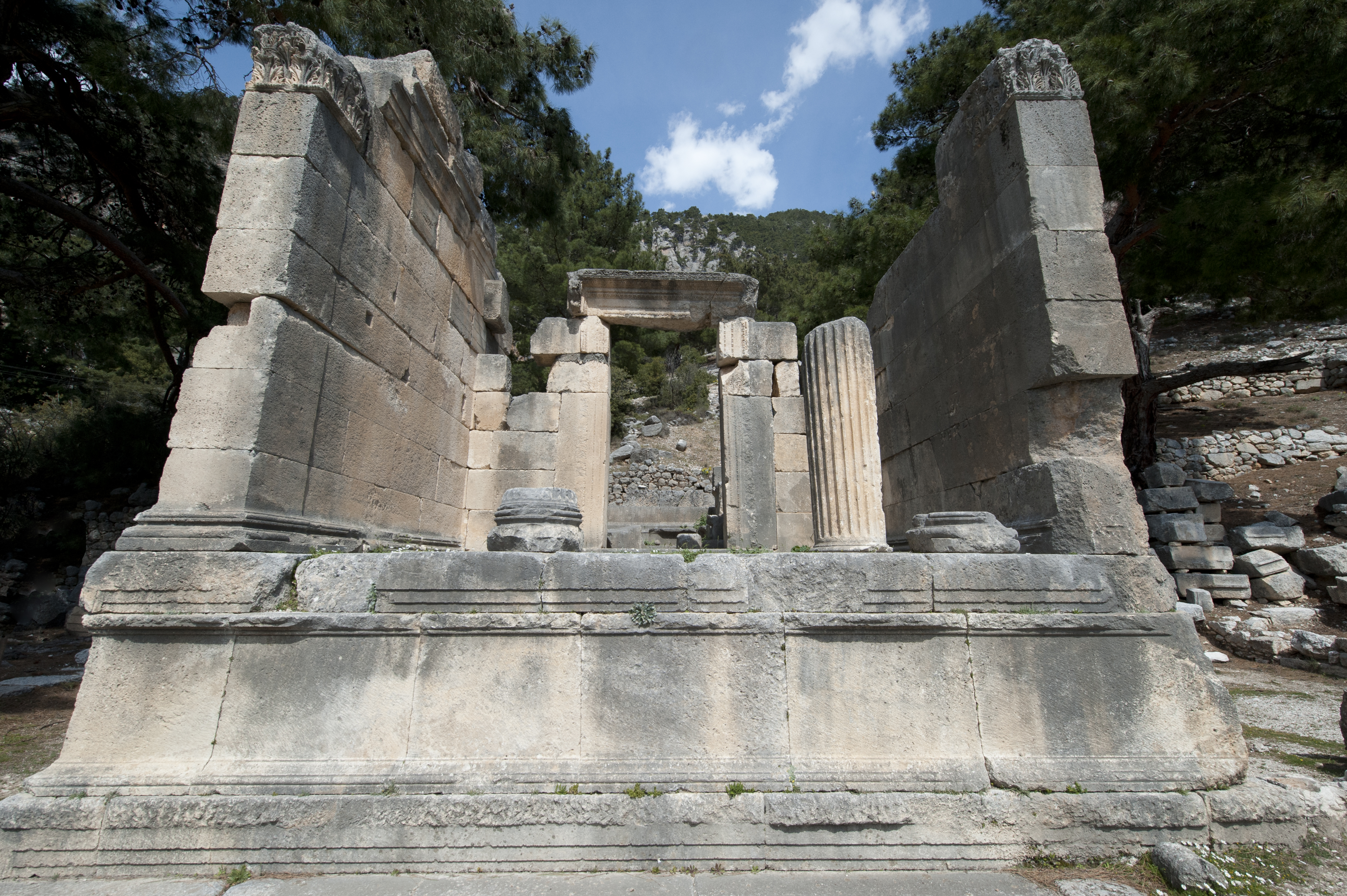
Arykanda Tomb 1

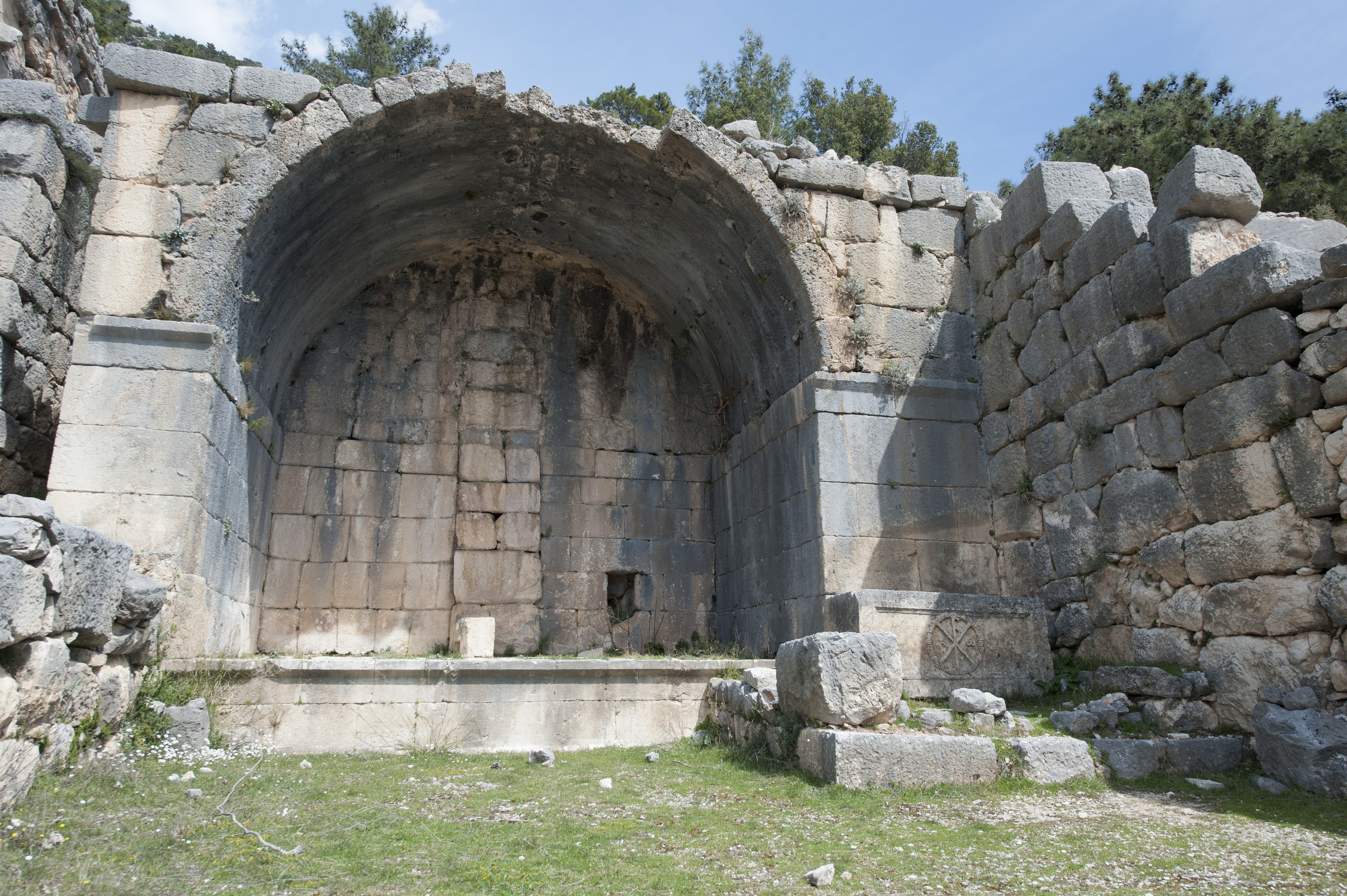
Arykanda Monumental grave

Monumental grave entrance detail
