= Çamlıbel, Finike =

Çamlıbel
- Neighbourhood
- Location in Turkey
- Coordinates: 36.4591°N 29.9397°E
- Country: Turkey
- Province: Antalya
- District: Finike
- Population (2022): 166
- Time zone: UTC+3 (TRT)

Çamlıbel is a neighbourhood in the municipality and district of Finike, Antalya Province, Turkey. Its population is 166 (2022).
