= Gökçeyaka, Finike =

Gökçeyaka
- Neighbourhood
- Location in Turkey
- Coordinates: 36.4303°N 30.0931°E
- Country: Turkey
- Province: Antalya
- District: Finike
- Population (2022): 173
- Time zone: UTC+3 (TRT)

Gökçeyaka is a neighbourhood in the municipality and district of Finike, Antalya Province, Turkey. Its population is 173 (2022).
