= Arif, Finike =

Arif
- Neighbourhood
- Location in Turkey
- Coordinates: 36°31′N 30°03′E
- Country: Turkey
- Province: Antalya
- District: Finike
- Population (2022): 975
- Time zone: UTC+3 (TRT)

Arif is a neighbourhood in the municipality and district of Finike, Antalya Province, Turkey. Its population is 975 (2022). The village is inhabited by Tahtacı.
