= Yeşilköy, Finike =

Yeşilköy
- Neighbourhood
- Location in Turkey
- Coordinates: 36.4769°N 30.0258°E
- Country: Turkey
- Province: Antalya
- District: Finike
- Population (2022): 299
- Time zone: UTC+3 (TRT)

Yeşilköy is a neighbourhood in the municipality and district of Finike, Antalya Province, Turkey. Its population is 299 (2022).
