= Akçaalan, Finike =

Akçaalan
- Neighbourhood
- Location in Turkey
- Coordinates: 36.4819°N 30.2105°E
- Country: Turkey
- Province: Antalya
- District: Finike
- Population (2022): 97
- Time zone: UTC+3 (TRT)

Akçaalan is a neighbourhood in the municipality and district of Finike, Antalya Province, Turkey. Its population is 97 (2022).
