= Ernez, Finike =

Ernez
- Neighbourhood
- Location in Turkey
- Coordinates: 36.4595°N 29.8755°E
- Country: Turkey
- Province: Antalya
- District: Finike
- Population (2022): 694
- Time zone: UTC+3 (TRT)

Ernez (formerly: Günçalı) is a neighbourhood in the municipality and district of Finike, Antalya Province, Turkey. Its population was 694 in 2022.
