= Asarönü, Finike =

Asarönü
- Neighbourhood
- Location in Turkey
- Coordinates: 36°22′N 30°06′E
- Country: Turkey
- Province: Antalya
- District: Finike
- Population (2022): 154
- Time zone: UTC+3 (TRT)

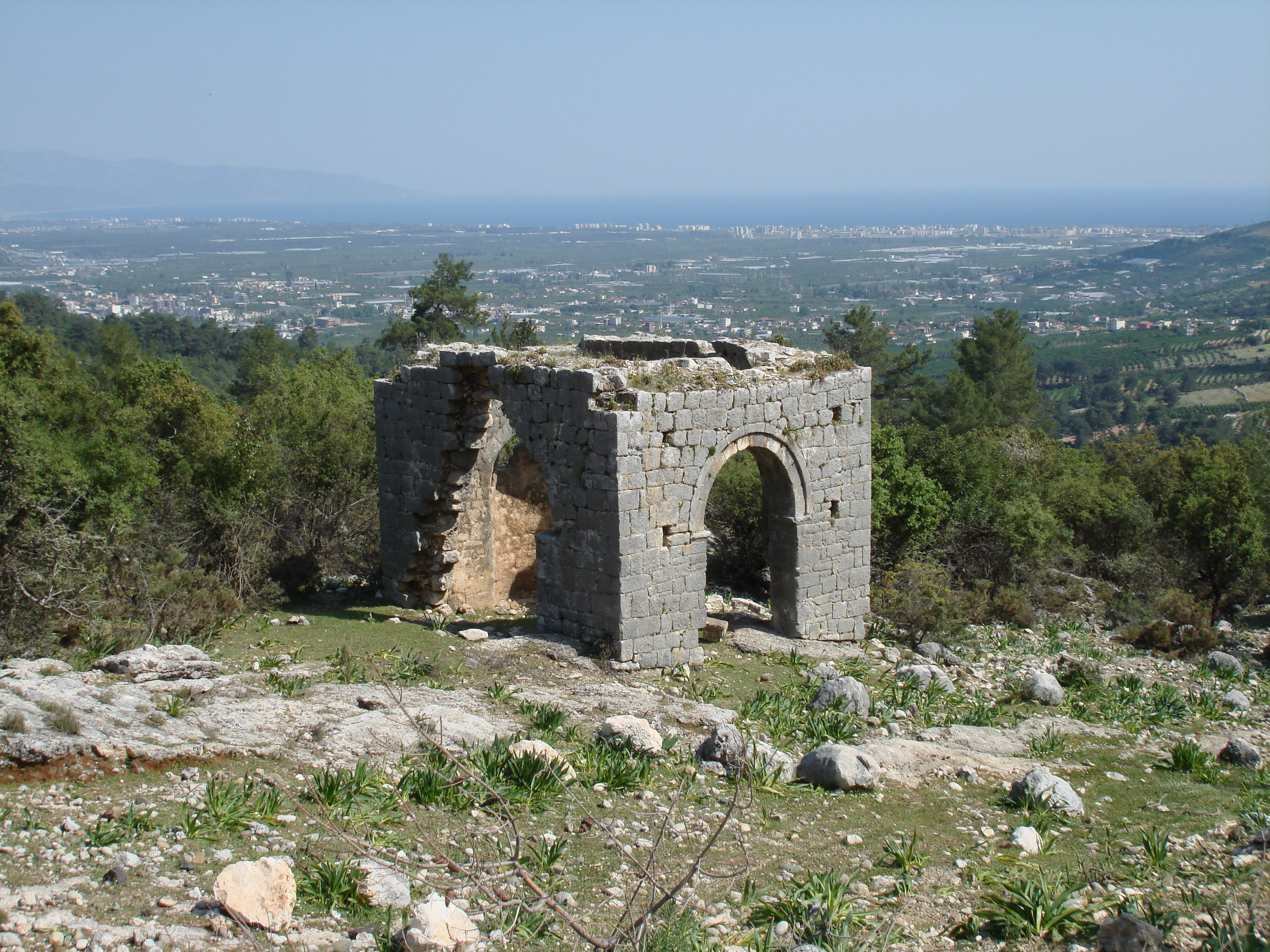
Tomb structure in Asarönü, Finike.

Asarönü is a neighbourhood in the municipality and district of Finike, Antalya Province, Turkey. Its population is 154 (2022).
