= Yalnız, Finike =

Yalnız
- Neighbourhood
- Country: Turkey
- Province: Antalya
- District: Finike
- Population (2022): 704
- Time zone: UTC+3 (TRT)

Yalnız is a neighbourhood in the municipality and district of Finike, Antalya Province, Turkey. Its population is 704 (2022).
