= Dağbağ, Finike =

Dağbağ
- Neighbourhood
- Location in Turkey
- Coordinates: 36°26′N 29°56′E
- Country: Turkey
- Province: Antalya
- District: Finike
- Population (2022): 207
- Time zone: UTC+3 (TRT)

Dağbağ is a neighbourhood in the municipality and district of Finike, Antalya Province, Turkey. Its population is 207 (2022).
