= Turunçova =

- Neighbourhood
- Location in Turkey
- Coordinates: 36°22′N 30°08′E
- Country: Turkey
- Province: Antalya
- District: Finike
- Elevation: 30 m (98 ft)
- Population (2022): 7,690
- Time zone: UTC+3 (TRT)
- Postal code: 07880
- Area code: 0242

Turunçova is a neighbourhood in the municipality and district of Finike, Antalya Province, Turkey. Its population is 7,690 (2022). Before the 2013 reorganisation, it was a town (belde). The village is inhabited by Tahtacı.

Turunçova is situated on Turkish state highway D.635. Distance to Finike is 8 kilometres (5.0 mi). The area around Turunçova was always inhabited during the historical ages and the ancient city Limyra is at the east of Turunçova. In 1956, two former villages named Çavdır and Bağyaka were merged to form the town of Turunçova. The town economy depends on citrus farming and industry.
