= Finike =

- District and municipality
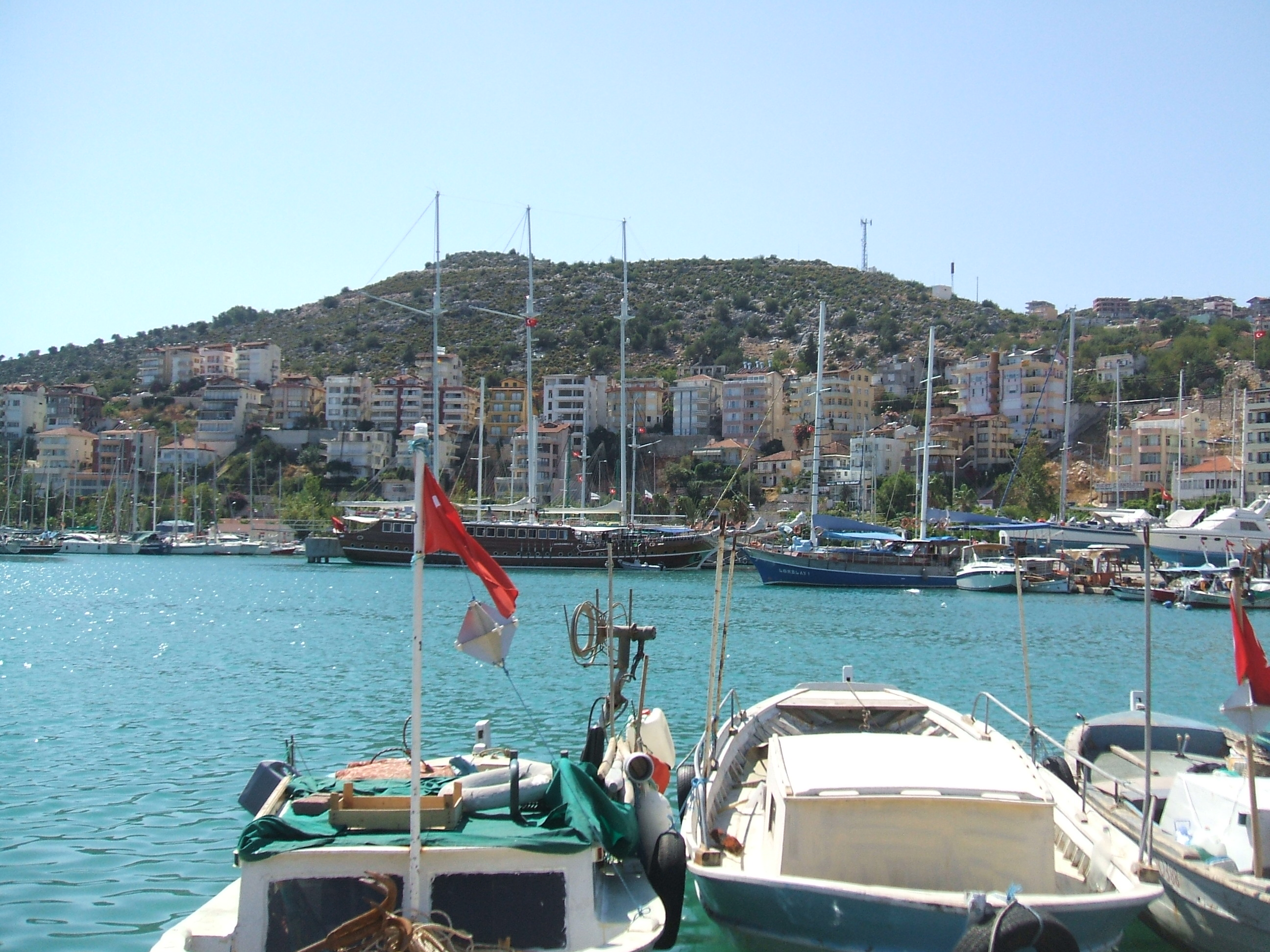
- Port of Finike

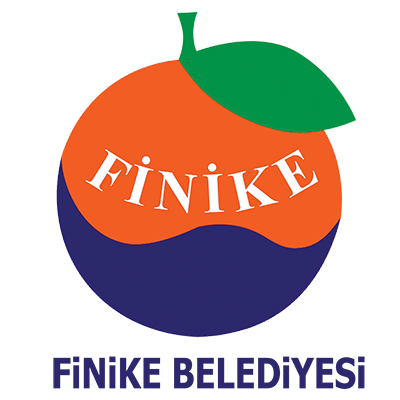
- Logo

- Map showing Finike District in Antalya Province

- Location within Turkey
- Coordinates: 36°18′N 30°09′E
- Country: Turkey
- Province: Antalya

Government
  - Mayor: Mustafa Geyikçi (CHP)
- Area: 768 km^{2} (297 sq mi)
- Elevation: 3 m (9.8 ft)
- Population (2022): 49,720
  - Density: 64.7/km^{2} (168/sq mi)
- Time zone: UTC+3 (TRT)
- Postal code: 07740
- Area code: 0242
- Website: www.finike.bel.tr

Finike (Turkish: [feˈnice]), the ancient Phoenix or Phoinix (Ancient Greek: Φοῖνιξ), also formerly Phineka, is a municipality and district of Antalya Province, Turkey. Its area is 768 km^{2}, and its population is 49,720 (2022). It lies on the Mediterranean coast of Antalya Province in Turkey, to the west of the city of Antalya, along the Turkish Riviera. It is located on the southern shore of the Teke peninsula, and the coast here is a popular tourist destination. However, Finike is best known for its oranges, the symbol of the town.

== History ==
For centuries Finike, then named Phoenix or Phoinix (Φοῖνιξ) was a port town of ancient Lycia, near the mountain of the same name. It was a trading port and the main port of Limyra, the capital city of Lycia. Phoenix was said to have been founded by Phoenicians in the 5th century BC, and thus named after its founders.

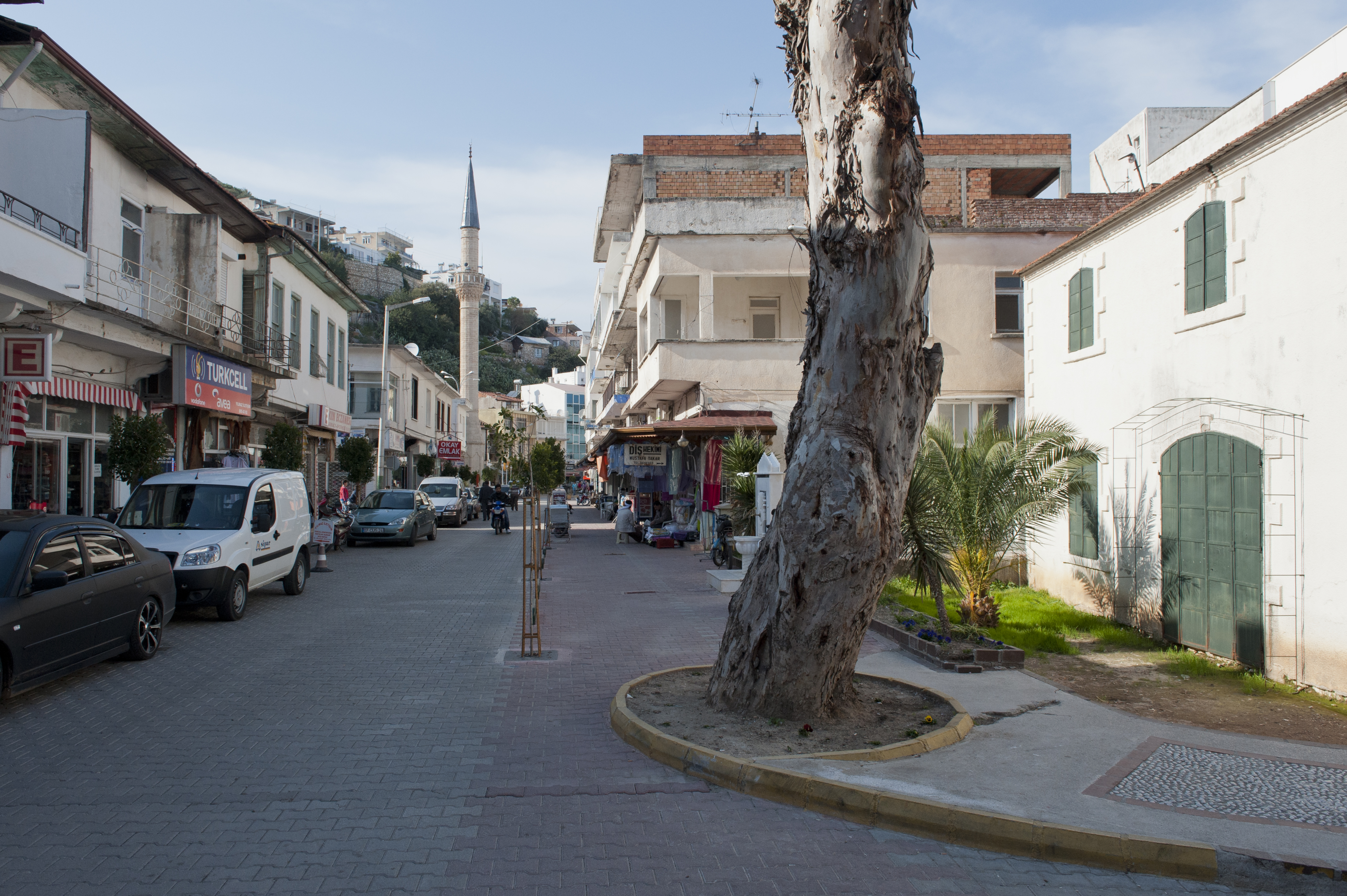
Finike Atatürk Street

The area has been inhabited for much longer than that; archaeologists have found evidence near the town of Elmalı showing that the Teke peninsula has been settled since 3000 BC (although on the coast nothing has been uncovered dating before 2000 BC).

Trade along the coast was established first by the Persians, who relinquished Lycia to the armies of Alexander the Great. However, the coast was always vulnerable to forces from Syria, Egypt and Rhodes until it was brought within the empire of the Ancient Romans and the succeeding Byzantines. Even then the Byzantines were threatened by the Arabian armies coming from the Arabian Peninsula. The Battle of the Masts between the Arab and Byzantine fleet took place near Finike in 654. Eventually the area was conquered by the Seljuk Turks in the 13th century. These were succeeded by the Ottoman Empire from 1426.

The town was inhabited by Greeks prior to the 1923 population exchange between Greece and Turkey.

== Composition ==
There are 26 neighbourhoods in Finike District:

- Akçaalan
- Alacadağ
- Arif
- Asarönü
- Boldağ
- Çamlıbel
- Dağbağ
- Ernez
- Eski
- Gökbük
- Gökçeyaka
- Hasyurt
- İskele
- Kale
- Karşıyaka
- Kızılca
- Kum
- Sahilkent
- Saklısu
- Salur
- Turunçova
- Yalnız
- Yazır
- Yeni
- Yeşilköy
- Yeşilyurt
- Yuvalı

== Climate ==
Finike has a hot-summer Mediterranean climate (Köppen: Csa), with very hot, muggy, virtually rainless summers, and mild winters with heavy rain.

Climate data for Finike (1991–2020)
Month	Jan	Feb	Mar	Apr	May	Jun	Jul	Aug	Sep	Oct	Nov	Dec	Year
Mean daily maximum °C (°F)	16.3 (61.3)	16.7 (62.1)	19.0 (66.2)	22.2 (72.0)	26.4 (79.5)	31.3 (88.3)	34.5 (94.1)	34.8 (94.6)	31.7 (89.1)	27.3 (81.1)	22.2 (72.0)	17.9 (64.2)	25.1 (77.2)
Daily mean °C (°F)	11.5 (52.7)	12.0 (53.6)	14.1 (57.4)	17.1 (62.8)	21.2 (70.2)	25.8 (78.4)	28.8 (83.8)	29.1 (84.4)	25.8 (78.4)	21.5 (70.7)	16.7 (62.1)	13.0 (55.4)	19.8 (67.6)
Mean daily minimum °C (°F)	7.8 (46.0)	7.9 (46.2)	9.4 (48.9)	12.1 (53.8)	16.0 (60.8)	20.0 (68.0)	22.9 (73.2)	23.3 (73.9)	20.1 (68.2)	16.5 (61.7)	12.4 (54.3)	9.4 (48.9)	14.9 (58.8)
Average precipitation mm (inches)	208.92 (8.23)	144.17 (5.68)	79.48 (3.13)	47.91 (1.89)	21.37 (0.84)	8.75 (0.34)	1.91 (0.08)	1.86 (0.07)	14.49 (0.57)	71.36 (2.81)	129.08 (5.08)	236.32 (9.30)	965.62 (38.02)
Average precipitation days (≥ 1.0 mm)	10.7	8.3	6.3	4.1	2.7	1.3	1.5	1.5	1.9	4.4	6.1	10.3	59.1
Average relative humidity (%)	67.7	66.8	66.5	67.1	67.3	62.3	59.6	60.3	61.1	63.4	64.7	68.0	64.6
Mean monthly sunshine hours	142.3	158.1	212.8	247.9	297.7	339.2	362.8	336.6	286.7	242.3	176.6	135.2	2,920.8
Source: NOAA

== Demographics ==
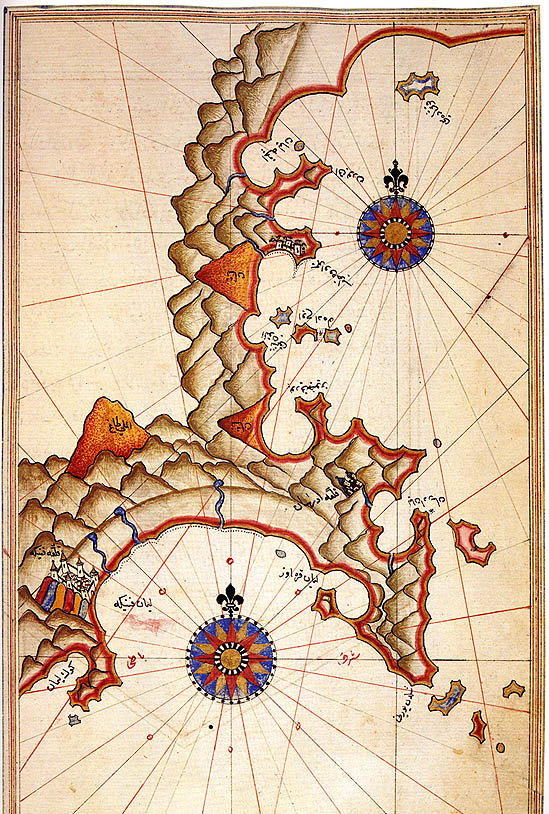
Historic map of Finike by Piri Reis

The district has a population of 49,720 (2022). The town itself has 21,765 inhabitants.

== Finike today ==
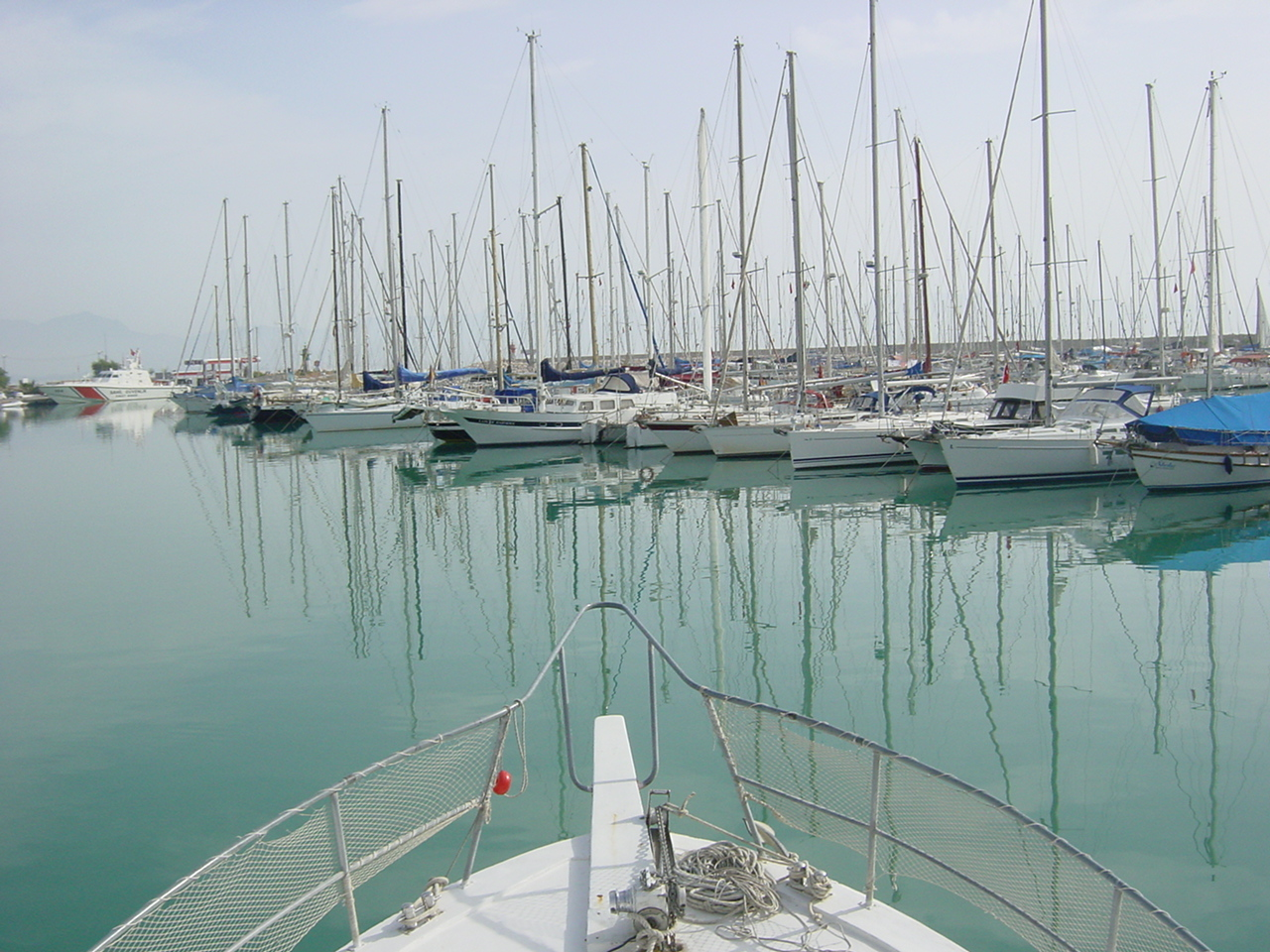
Marina of Finike

The local economy depends on agriculture, particularly oranges and other citrus fruits. This is supplemented by income from tourism in the summertime, although because of the lucrative orange production and the distance from Antalya, Finike has not seen the large-scale tourism boom that has so radically changed the other coastal districts of Antalya. Finike is a quiet district where people buzz around on mopeds going about their daily lives. Indeed, many of the visitors that Finike does attract are retired people in search of relaxation. That's mostly because of the construction policy of 1980. That policy made the land more suitable for investment in agriculture rather than in hotels, luxury apartments and other tourist attractions.

A type of pale limestone is quarried at Limyra, and sold as a decorative building material. It is cream colored with a homogeneous structure. Moreover, it is extremely light and that makes it ideal for building walking alleys and streets where only light vehicles pass by. The geologist classify the Limura limestone as with medium density.

The port of Finike is now a yacht marina, and has a small fishing fleet. The coast is rich in marine life, including sea turtles, and fish, including local specialities red porgy (Sparidae) and grouper (Epinephelus); other fish found along the coast include leerfish (Carangidae) and the more widespread Mediterranean varieties such as bluefish, sea bream, sea bass, with swordfish, sardines and others found further out to sea. However, the coast suffers from overfishing, and many varieties, including the porgy, are in decline.

The beaches of Finike are an important nesting ground for Caretta caretta sea turtles, and the rocky parts of the coast are used by the rare Mediterranean monk seal.

== Places of interest ==
- The ruins of Limyra are to be seen three miles east of the Finike, they consist of a theatre, tombs, Sarcophagi, bas-reliefs, Greek and Lycian inscriptions, etc.
- The ancient city of Arycanda, in a narrow valley off the road to Elmalı.
- The ruins of Trysa with a carved frieze depicting Theseus, on the road to Kaş.
- The small village of Turuncova, hidden in a small valley of Taurus Mountains, has preserved its traditional lifestyle and culture.
- The cave of Suluin.
- Wreck of a Phoenician merchant ship from about 1200 BC in Cape Gelidonya

There are doubtless many more places of antiquity that need to be restored.

== See also ==
- Turkish Riviera
- Blue Cruise
