= Typallia =

Ancient Lycian town

Coordinates: 36°48′27″N 30°26′41″E

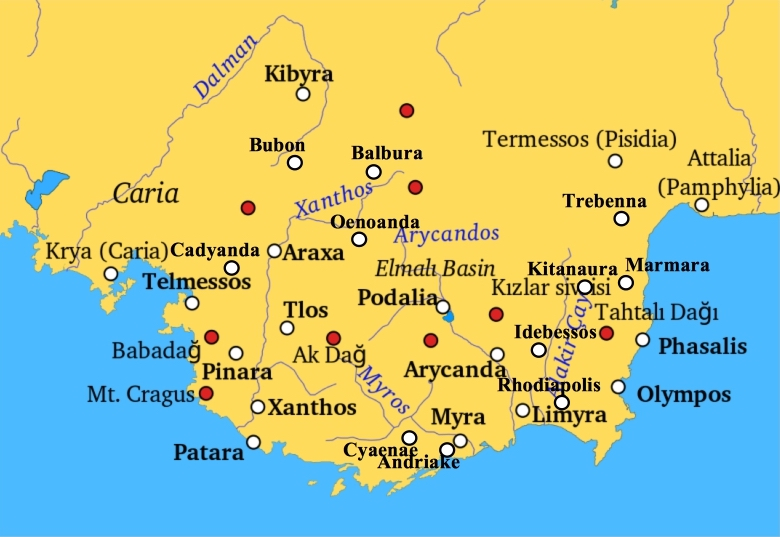
Cities of ancient Lycia. Red dots: mountain peaks, white dots: ancient cities

Typallia was a town of ancient Lycia.

Its site is located on a rocky hill called Asarlık Tepe near the modern village of Çitdibi.

It is on the ancient road between Trebenna and Kitanaura as is clearly recorded on the Miliarium Lyciae. The inscriptions on the sarcophagi record the name of the settlement which was localised for the first time by İplikçioğlu. He also determined that the settlement formed a sympoliteia together with Termessos.

The acropolis is on top of the hill and on its south slopes is the settlement. The entrance to the acropolis is cut into the bedrock.

On the southeast slope of the acropolis are the reasonably well-preserved baths, still standing to the level of the upper walls. It comprises three rooms side by side and is a good example of Roman period provincial baths. The walls were plastered inside and out and the white marble plaques and marble plate fragments establish beyond doubt the function of this building.
