= Lycian Way =

Long-distance trail in Turkey

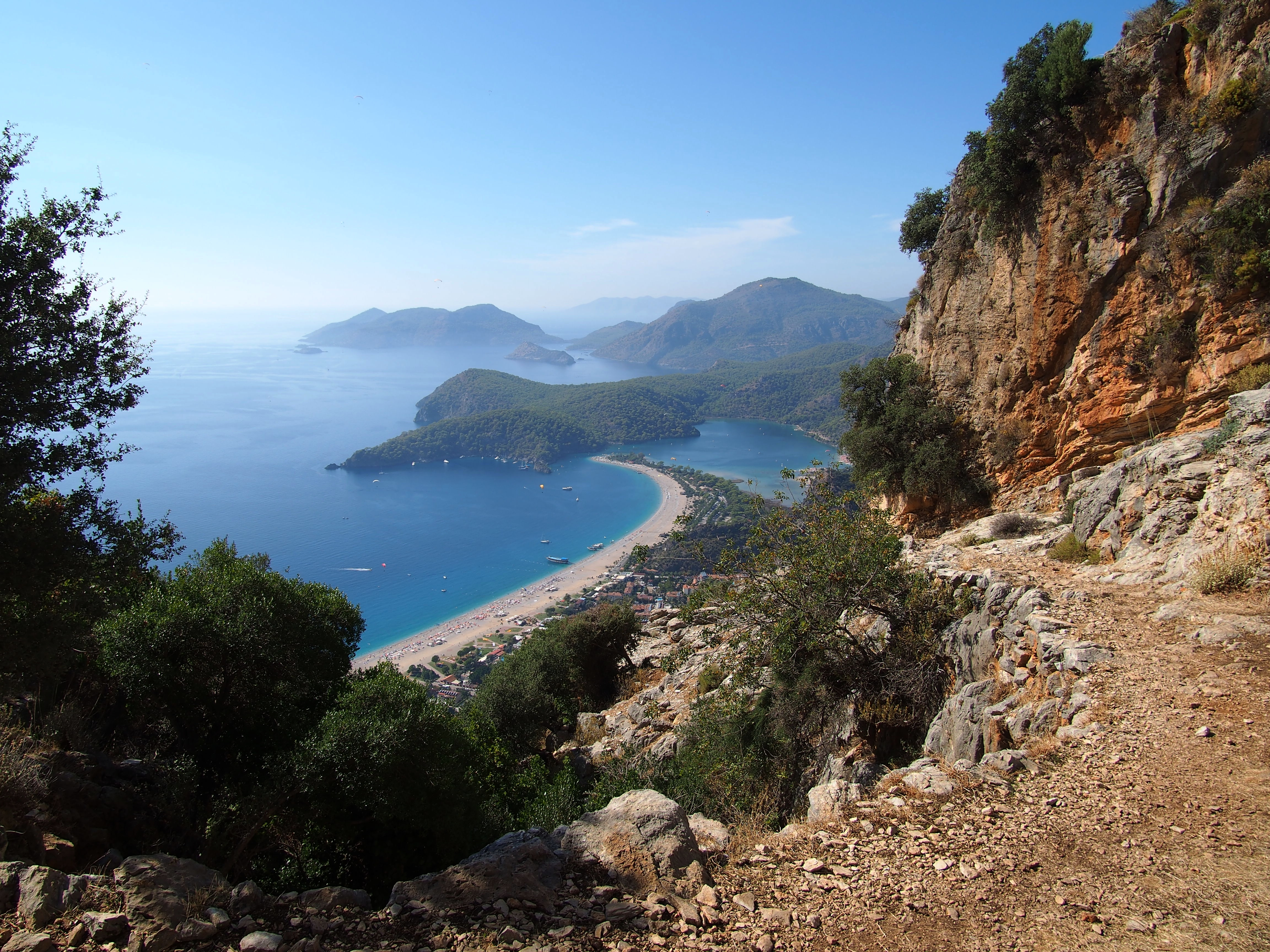
- Lycian Way near the start at Fethiye
- Length: 520 km (320 mi) (approx.)
- Location: Teke Peninsula, southwestern Turkey
- Established: 1999; 27 years ago
- Trailheads: Hisarönü (Ovacık, Fethiye), Muğla Province; Geyikbayırı, Konyaaltı, Antalya Province
- Use: Hiking
- Difficulty: sac = mountain hiking
- Season: Spring and autumn
- Sights: Historic Lycian ruins; views over coast and sea
- Website: http://www.cultureroutesinturkey.com

The Lycian Way (Turkish: Likya Yolu) is a marked long-distance hiking trail in southwestern Turkey around part of the coast of ancient Lycia. It is approximately 760 km (470 mi) in length and stretches from Hisarönü (Ovacık), near Fethiye, to Aşağı Karaman in Konyaaltı, about 20 km (12 mi) from Antalya. It is waymarked with red and white stripes of the GR footpath convention.

The trail, which was conceived by Briton Kate Clow, takes its name from the ancient civilization that once ruled the region.

== History of the region ==
Lycia was a region on the Western Taurus Mountains in Teke Peninsula at southwestern Anatolia on the Mediterranean Sea coast, located in what are today the provinces of Muğla and Antalya. The Lycian people lived in the area from the prehistoric period until they were absorbed into Roman culture Late Bronze Age. They built city-states along the Mediterranean Sea coast, such as Xanthos, Patara, Myra, Pinara, Tlos, Olympos, and Phaselis, and formed the Lycian League. Thanks to their strategic location, they had best opportunities for sea trade and even piracy.

The Lycians developed their own art style as well as had independent democratic governance. In later times, the region of Lycia was occupied by the Persian Empire, Ancient Greece, and then controlled by Ancient Rome, the Byzantine Empire, the Seljuk Empire, and the Ottoman Empire. Rock-cut tombs on cliff walls and sarcophagi in the region testify to the ancient Lycian civilization.

== Conception and opening ==
The Lycian Way, parts of which were used by the Lycians as routes between their cities and ports, was conceived by Kate Clow, a British expatriate. The trail was opened in 1999. The Garanti Bank sponsored the waymarking, which was carried out by volunteers, organized by Clow.

== Trail ==
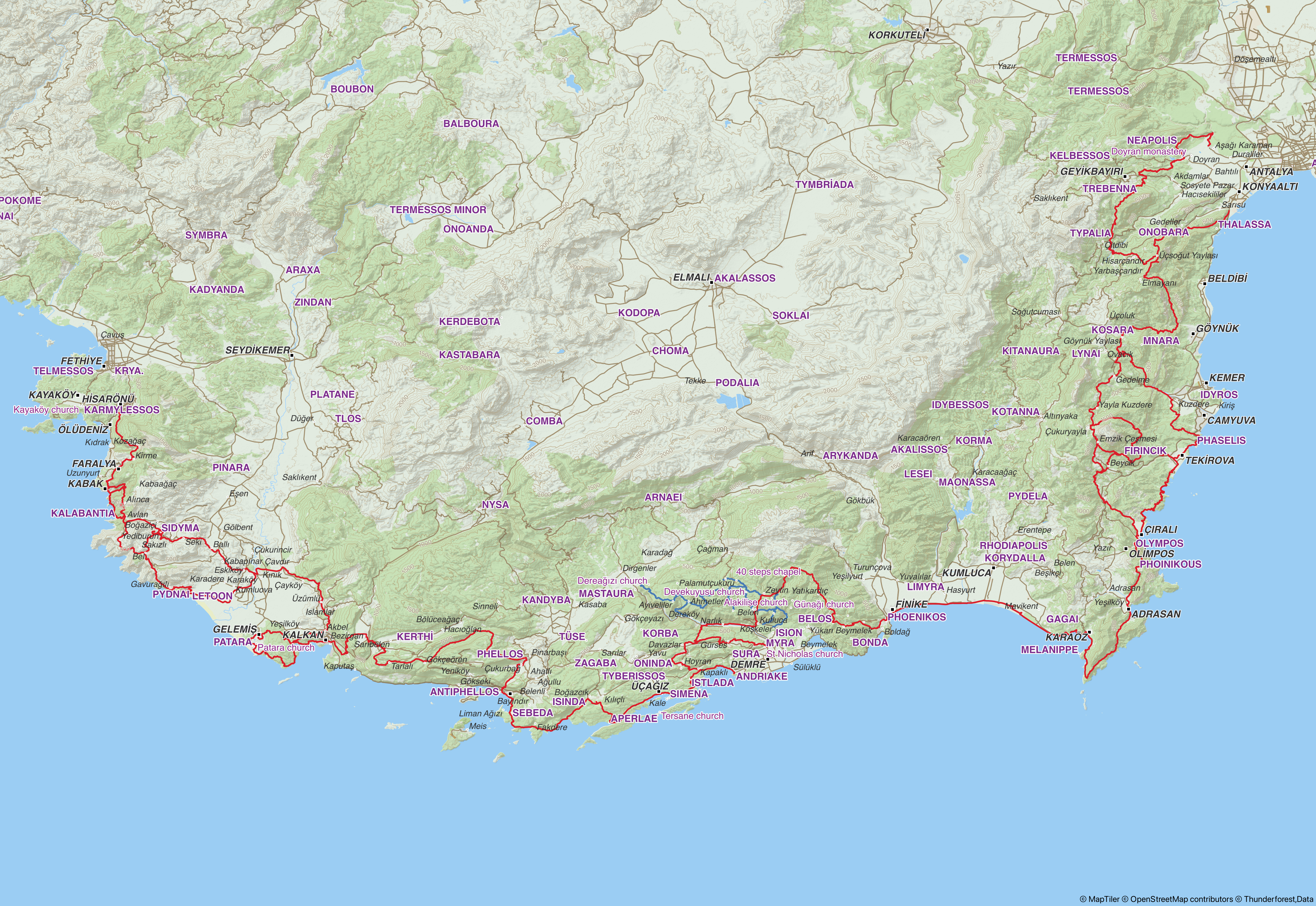
A map of the Lycian Way

The Lycian Way, named after the Lycian civilization that ruled in this region, is over 760 km (470 mi) in length, stretching from Hisarönü (Ovacık) in the Fethiye district of Muğla in the west to Geyikbayırı in the Konyaaltı district of Antalya Province in the east. The long-distance trail is waymarked after the French Grande Randonnée special system, and the intersections are marked with yellow directional signs.

The trails are marked on both sides of rocks and tree trunks at every 50 m (160 ft), and the dirt roads at about 100 m (330 ft) along the route, especially at places like forks or crossroads, with signs of a white stripe above a red stripe. Red-cross marks indicate that the cross-marked route should not be entered. The signs are periodically renewed by volunteers.

Some parts of the Lycian Way are suitable for trail riding with mountain bikes. In some places, experienced downhill and single-track enthusiasts can pass the entire track by carrying the bike on the back. However, it is also possible to try the bicycle route, which is partly on the Lycian Way and on parallel side roads, by using alternative forest and village roads.

Clow wrote a guidebook in which the characteristics of the trail, such as the width of the path, the kinds of waymarks, and the distance and hiking time of the stages, are described. The history and natural surroundings are also described. The book also has detailed trail maps, descriptions of the sections and information about villages en-route The latest edition (2022) includes several extensions to the trail, including the St Nicholas Ways route network in the hills above Demre, and an alternative route, the Lyra Way, around Mt Olympos.

The trail is characterized by a mixture of different views and walking experiences as the trail travels through the mountainous coast. The region is characterized by strawberry trees, pine trees and carobs in lower regions. The higher regions have cedars and junipers.

== Climate ==
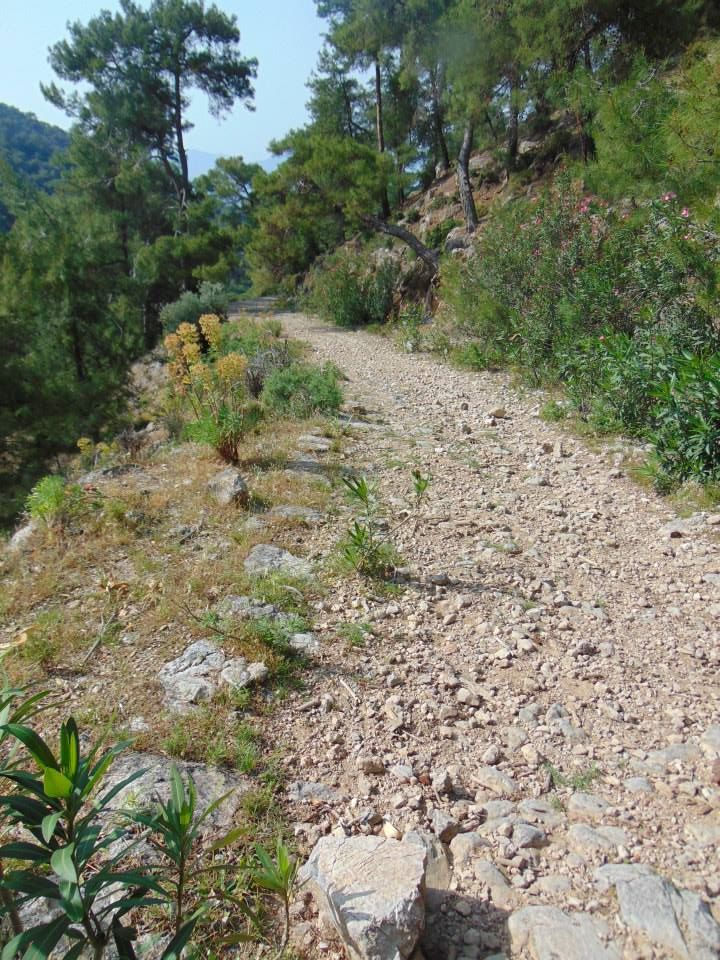
The Lycian Way during the summer

The region has hot, dry summers and mild winters with low annual rainfall due to the prevailing Mediterranean climate. The hiking season is long; however, the best time is the spring season, when the hills are still snow covered and the landscape is covered with flowers. The months of October and November in the autumn season also offer enjoyable hiking as the heat and humidity decrease gradually.

At higher elevations and on the mountain peaks, weather reminiscent of all four seasons can be experienced in one day. Low-elevation areas are quite hot for hiking activity in mid-May and mid-September. Rain and storms can be experienced in December and January. From January to early April, there is usually snow at elevations over 1,500 m (4,900 ft). Between November and February, downpours can occur.

== Equipment ==
The recommended equipment required for hiking in the Lycian Way consists of soft-soled, ankle-grasping, breathable hiking boots, quick-drying pants and socks, moisture-wicking fabric shirts, headgear, cheesecloth for covering the neck, raincoat, spare clothes and underwear, sunglasses, sunscreen, and a backpack. It is useful to have a swimsuit and towel.

Other useful equipment includes compass, trail map, whistle, pocket knife, headlight, camera, lighter, spare battery, a small first-aid kit, and a mobile phone.

== Stages ==
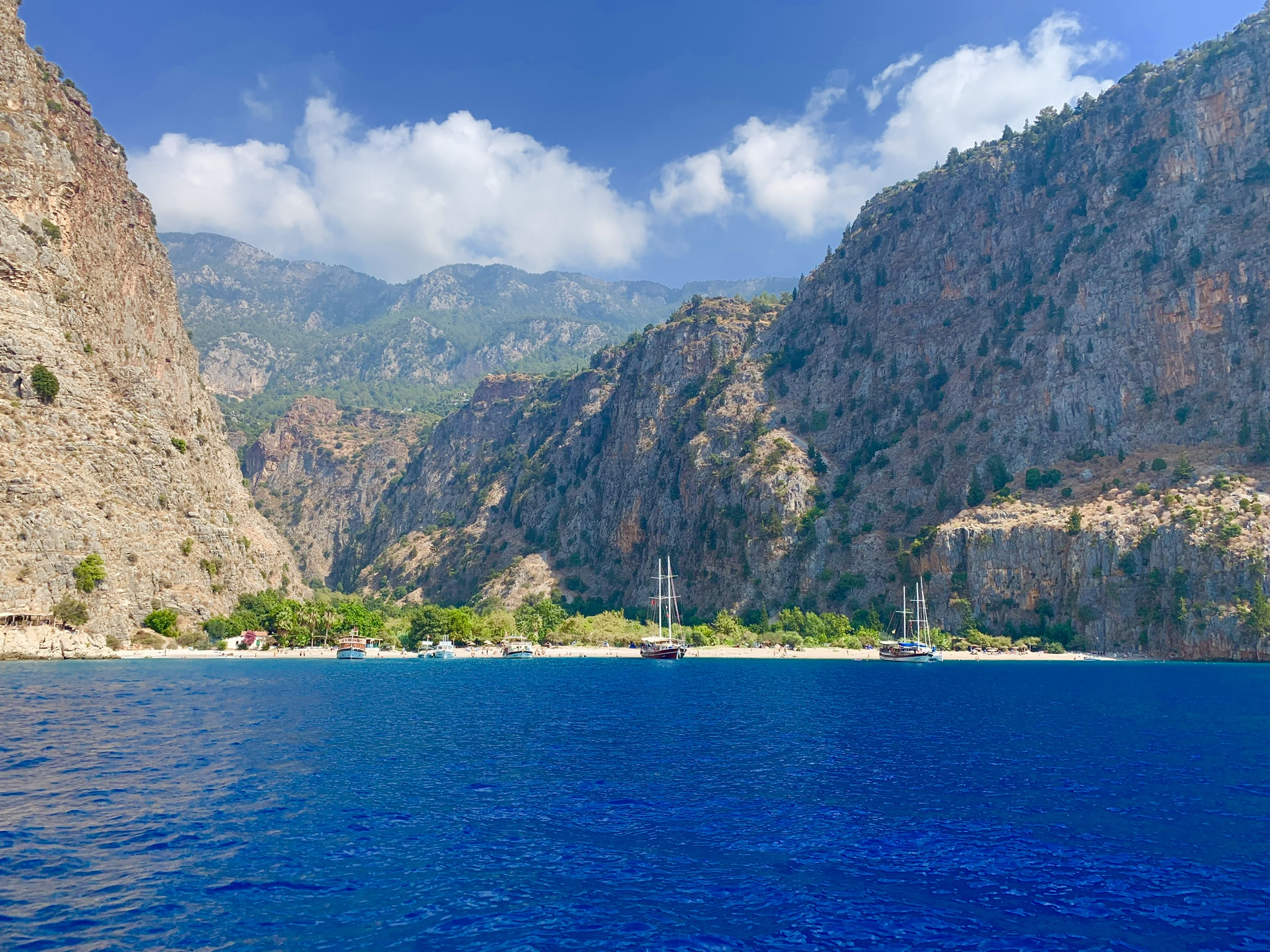
The Lycian Way passes above Butterfly Valley

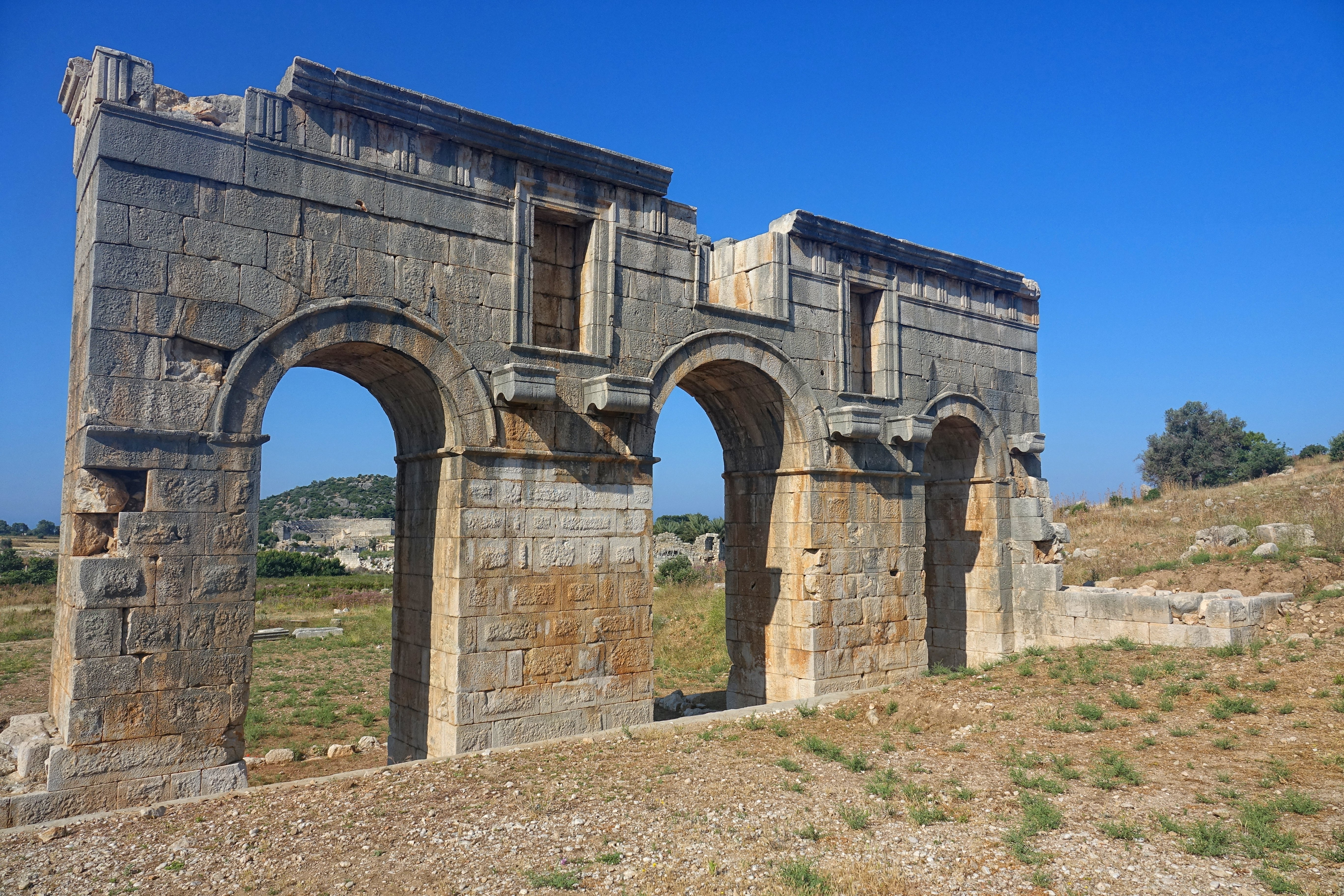
The restored city gate of Patara

The first Lycian Way had the following stages Hisarönü (Ovacık)-Faralya, Faralya-Kabak Bay, Kabak Bay-Alınca, Alınca-Yediburunlar, Yediburunlar-Gavurağılı, Gavurağılı-Patara, Patara-Kalkan, Kalkan-Sarıbelen-Gökçeören, Gökçeören-Kaş, Kaş-Kekova, Kekova-Demre, Demre-Alakilise-Finike, Karaöz-Cape Gelidonya-Adrasan, Adrasan-Olimpos-Çıralı, Çıralı-Beycik, Çıralı-Tekirova, Tekirova-Phaselis-Gedelme, Beycik-Tahtalı Dağı-Gedelme, Gedelme-Göynük, Göynük-Hisarçandır, and Hisarçandır-Geyikbayırı.

The trail splits into:

- coastal and inland options between Kabak and Yediburunlar
- a direct route from Sidyma to Xanthos
- The St Nicholas Ways - a selection of 6 routes in the Alacadağ foothills above Demre, which link the Byzantine churches of the area to the Lycian Way.
- Coastal route – Tekirova, Phaselis, Asagikuzdere, Goynuk Yaylasi, Hısarçandır, Çitdibi, Geyikbayırı
- Inland route – Ulupınar, Beycik, Yukari Beycik, pass over Tahtalı Dağı at 1800m, Çukuryayla, Yayla Kuzdere, Gedelme, Goynuk Yaylasi, where it joins the coastal trail.
- the Lyra Way - a difficult variation on the inland route - which leaves the route above at Beycik, circles Tahtalı on the north side, and rejoins the route at Çukuryayla.

== Places of interest ==
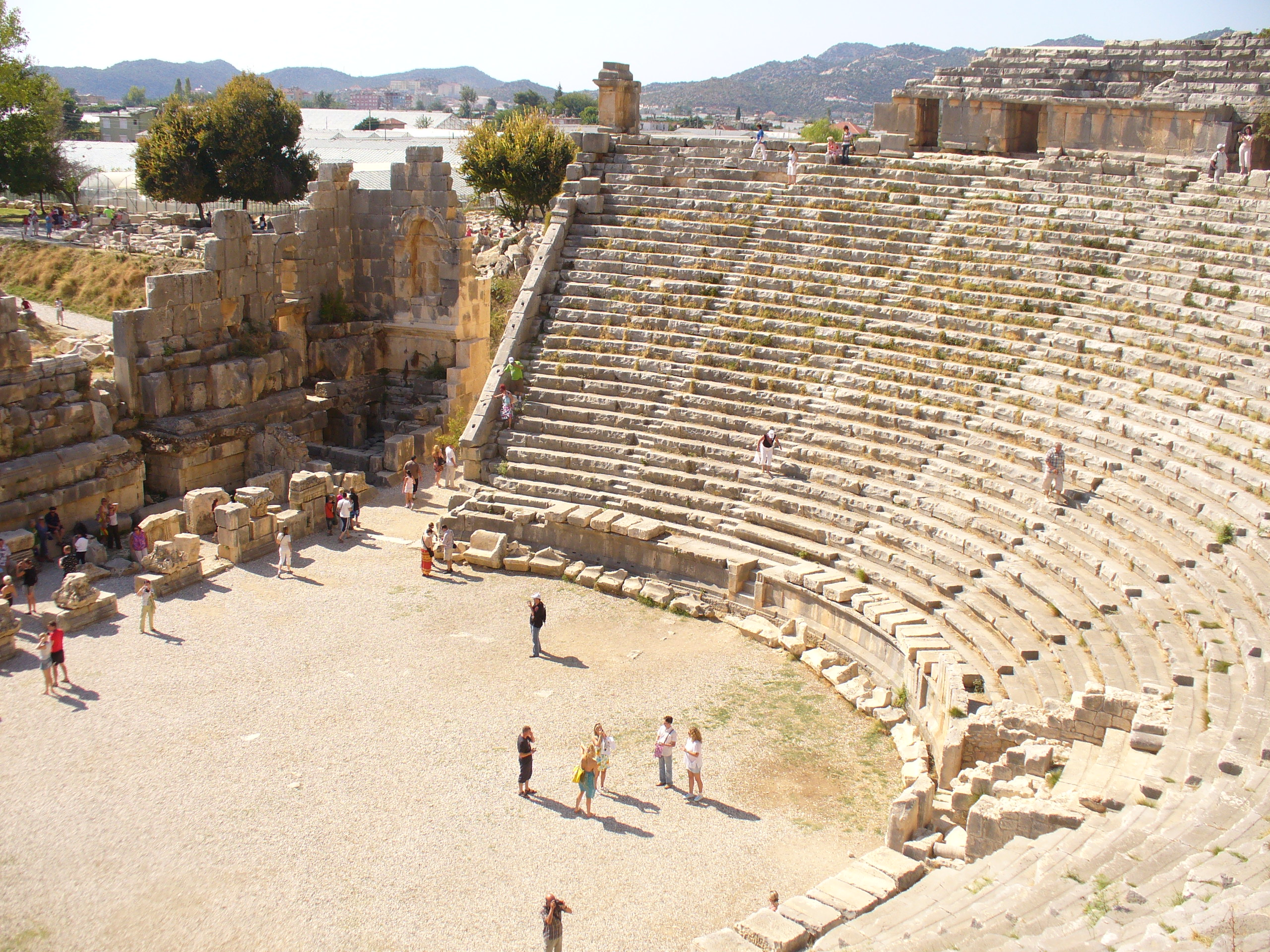
The amphitheatre at Myra (Demre)

Places of interest along the trail include: Ölüdeniz, Butterfly Valley, Faralya, Kabak Bay, Cennet Bay, Korsan Bay, Letoon (historical capital of the Lycian region, a UNESCO World Heritage Site in Seydikemer), Sidyma, Bel, Gavurağılı, Letoon, Kınık (Xanthos), Akbel, Gelemiş village and ruins of Patara (the Lycian capital), Kalkan, Sarıbelen, Gökçeören, Kaş (Antiphellos), Üçağız, Kale, Demre (Myra), Kumluca, Belören, Zeytin and Alakilise, İncegeriş Hill (1,811 m (5,942 ft) AMSL), Belos, Finike, Kumluca, Mavikent, Karaöz, the lighthouse of Cape Gelidonya (the southernmost point of Lycia), Adrasan, Olympos, Çıralı and Yanartaş (Chimaera).

The ancient cities Pydnae, Apelia, Telmessos, Idyros, Antiphellus, Apollonia, and Simena can be found between Xanthos and Patara.

== Access and lodging ==
The starting points of the Lycian Way can be reached from abroad from Dalaman Airport or Antalya Airport. Intercity coaches and local buses are available for transportation to the starting points.

Lodging is offered in hotels, motels, and bed and breakfast suitable for all budgets in locations such as Fethiye, Ölüdeniz, Faralya, Kabak Bay, Patara, Kalkan, Kaş, Kekova, Demre, Finike, Adrasan, Olympos, Çıralı, Tekirova, Çamyuva, Kemer, and Göynük. In some villages along the route, additional accommodation options have emerged in recent years by using traditional village houses as B&B. Natural camping sites and camping facilities are available on the route. Campsites in Kabak Bay, Patara, Özlen Çay, Sıcak Adası, Andriake (Çayağzı Port), Olympos, Çıralı, and Göynük are recommended.

== Plans ==
As of 2022, the Antalya Provincial Tourism Directorate has agreed with the Culture Routes Society to renew the signposts. The guidebook was reissued in English in late 2022, and will be reissued in Turkish in 2023. The complete route has been updated on OSM (OpenStreetMap), so any wayfinding application which uses OSMmaps shows the course of the route, water and accommodation points and other useful information. Suitable applications include Gaia, Locus, Maps.me.

== Ultramarathon ==
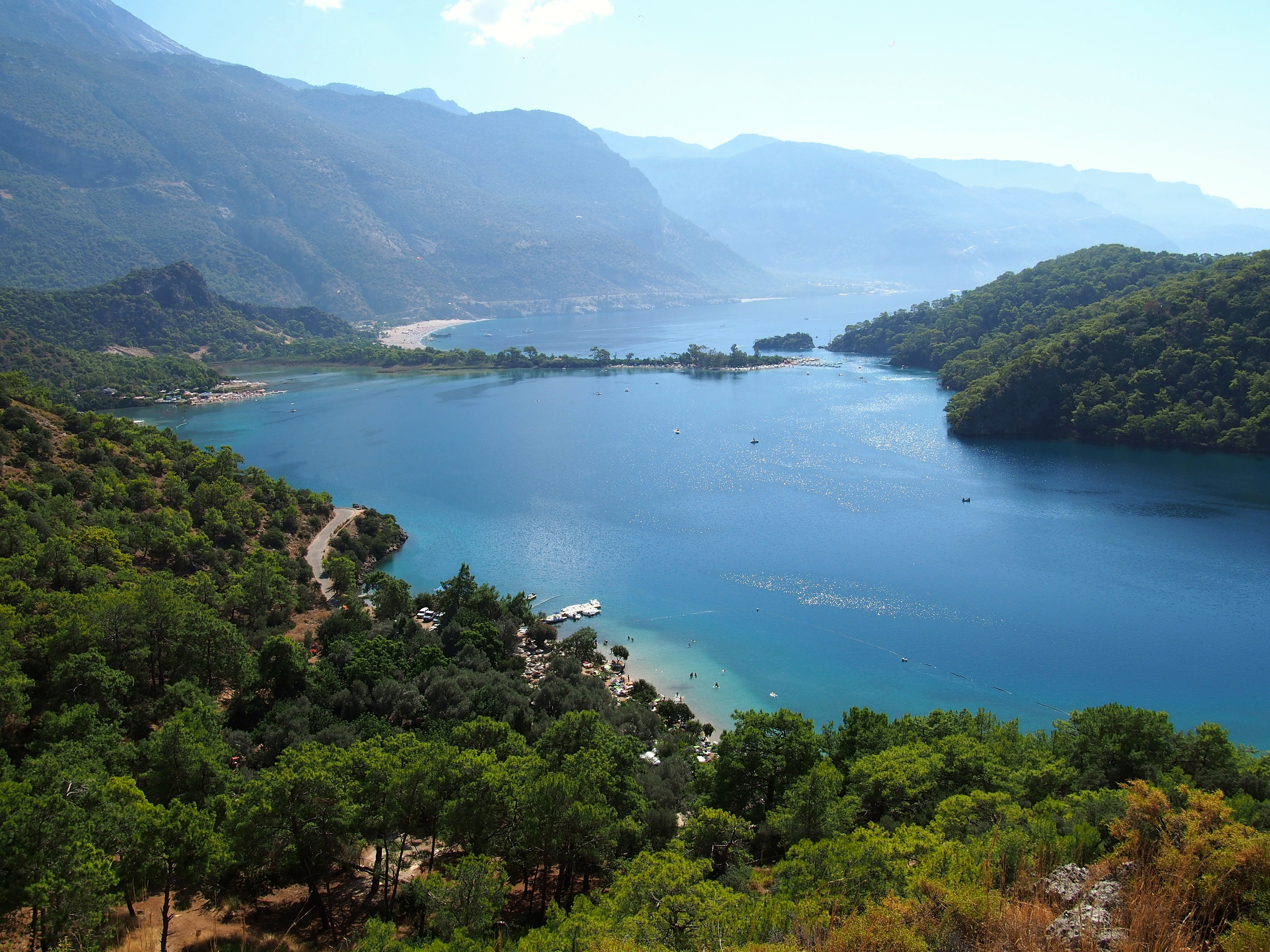
Ölüdeniz, from where the International Lycian Way Ultramarathon begins

Since 2010, an international multiday trail running ultramarathon, the Lycian Way Ultramarathon, has been held along the trail. The event, which runs eastwards on a route of around 220–240 km (140–150 mi) from Ölüdeniz to Antalya, is completed in around six days.

== See also ==
- Turkish Riviera
- List of long-distance footpaths
