= Lyrnai =

Lyrnai (Ancient Greek: Λύρναι) was a town of ancient Lycia, which per the Stadiasmus Patarensis was in the territory of Octapolis and the destination of a road from Calynda.

Its site is unlocated.
