= Onobara =

Town of ancient Lycia

Coordinates: 36°47′39″N 30°30′10″E

Onobara (Ancient Greek: Όνόβαρα) was a town of ancient Lycia, which per the Stadiasmus Patarensis was the destination of a road from Trabenna.

Its site is located near Göderler, Asiatic Turkey.
