= Kitanaura =

Ancient city in Lycia

- Κιτάναυρα (Ancient Greek)
- Location within Turkey
- 36°38′51″N 30°21′59″E
- Type: Settlement
- Location: Saraycık, Antalya Province, Turkey
- Region: Lycia

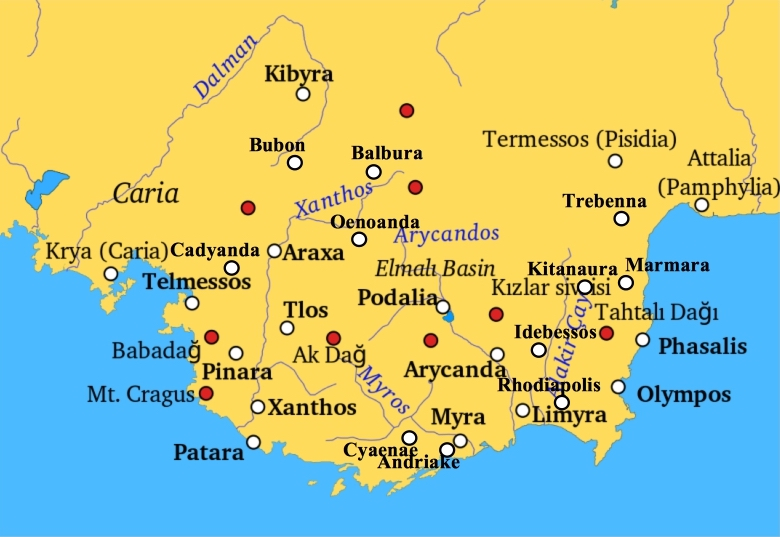
Cities of ancient Lycia. Red dots: mountain peaks, white dots: ancient cities

Kitanaura (Ancient Greek: Κιτάναυρα) (or Kithanaura) was an ancient city in Lycia. Its ruins are located near Saraycık, a small village in the Kumluca district of Antalya Province, Turkey.

== History ==
The history of the city is largely unknown because it was not mentioned by any ancient author. Only the ruins of the city give some information. The earliest phase of the city's walls dates to the Hellenistic period, with the last phase dating to the Byzantine period.

Because of the five churches which have been identified the city likely became more important with the spread of Christianity in Late Antiquity.

== Archaeological investigations ==
T. A. B. Spratt visited the site for two days in 1842 to copy inscriptions and drew a plan. He could not find any remains which indicated the name of the city, but he suspected that it was Marmara or Apollonia. Marmara has now been found, and Apollonia was eventually discovered far away in western Lycia.

A 1998 study of coins in the Antalya Museum led to the identification of the name of Kitanaura. The name of the city also appeared on a Roman milestone, the Miliarium Lyciae which was excavated at Patara in 1993. The inscriptions on the milestone give place names and distances during the 1st century AD. They mention Kitanaura lay at a distance of 17–18 km from Idebessos. This made it possible to pinpoint the location of the city.

Kitanaura was surveyed in detail by a team from Akdeniz University led by Nevzat Çevik in 2004–2005 and 2006–2007.

== City ==
The acropolis of Kitanaura was located on a hill extending in an east–west direction and surrounded by remains of structures to its south and west. The western and northern sides of the acropolis are covered by sheer rock cliffs, a less steeper rock slope is on southern side. Walls for the protection of the acropolis extended from the southwestern side to the eastern and northern side of the acropolis. They were 1.30 m thick and have been preserved to a height of 5 to 6 m at a few places.

Remains of a basilica are found in the southwestern corner of the acropolis. Another large basilica stood in the centre. A bath-gymnasium complex is the best remaining building. It lies at the foot of the southwestern entrance to the acropolis and consisted of a palaestra and six other sections. The quality of the construction and the size of the baths is striking for a medium-sized city in a relatively remote place in Lycia. With a size of 700 m^{2} the building is over twice the size of the central baths of Patara (315 m^{2}) and the southern baths of Xanthos (295 m^{2}), two of the largest cities in Lycia. The sizes of baths were influenced by both the population of a city and the number of occasional visitors from outside the city. The location of the baths at a crossroads of routes used by travellers suggests the baths served many temporary visitors.

The remains of a wall of huge irregular cut blocks that leads to the bath from the hill on the west side of the forest way is likely to belong to the aqueduct.

A road which runs from the south of the acropolis and then turns north, passing the acropolis to west, is flanked by necropoleis on both sides. A heroon is found south of the acropolis.
