= Lyrna =

Town of ancient Lycia

Coordinates: 36°57′35″N 29°01′13″E

Lyrnai or Lyrna (Ancient Greek: Λύρναι) was an inland town of ancient Lycia, inhabited during Hellenistic times. Its name does not occur among ancient authors, but known from epigraphic evidence. Per the Stadiasmus Patarensis Lyrnai was in the territory of Octapolis and the destination of a road from Calynda.

Its site is unlocated, but is hypothesized to be near Çukurhisar in Asiatic Turkey.
