= Kastabara =

Town in ancient Lycia

Kastabara (Ancient Greek: Καστάβαρα) was a town of ancient Lycia, which per the Stadiasmus Patarensis was 128 stadia from Tlos.

Its site is unlocated.
