= Karkabo =

Town of ancient Lycia

Coordinates: 36°19′45″N 30°00′08″E

Karkabo was a town of ancient Lycia.

Its site is located near Alakilise, Asiatic Turkey.
