= Kapuz Canyon =

Canyon in Antalya, Turkey

- Kapuz Kanyonu
- Location within Turkey
- Length: about =

Geography
- Location: Konyaaltı, Antalya Province, Turkey
- State/Province: Mediterranean Region
- Coordinates: 36.93616°N 30.57408°E
- Interactive map of Kapuz Canyon

Kapuz Canyon (Turkish: Kapuz Kanyonu) is a canyon in Antalya Province, southern Turkey.

Kapuz Canyon is located north of Aşağıkaraman Neighborhood of Konyaaltı District in Antalya Province. It is about 25 km (16 mi) away from the Antalya Airport, about 10 km (6.2 mi) far in the west of the city center of Antalya and at a distance of 3 km (1.9 mi) to Konyaaltı. Access to the canyon is via a dirt road in good condition that leads to the canyon entrance. Part of the hiking trail Lycian Way runs close to the canyon. The canyon is about 5 km (3.1 mi) long in north-south direction in general. The Karaman Creek, of which depth varies seasonally between 15–500 cm (5.9–196.9 in), flows through the canyon. A pond is situated in front of the canyon entrance. The last 400 m (1,300 ft) of the canyon are widening.

In the summer of 2019, the headman of AşağıKaraman Neighborhood started a joint work with Konyaaltı District Municipality and the State Hydraulic Works to open the canyon to tourism that was not well-known to the public. The canyon offers swimming and kayaking opportunities in addition to trekking.
