= Comba (Lycia) =

City in ancient Lycia

Coordinates: 36°33′05″N 29°40′10″E

Comba or Komba (Ancient Greek: τὰ Κὀμβα) was a city in ancient Lycia. Comba lay inland, near Mount Cragus, and the cities Octapolis and Symbra. Its site is located near Gömbe in Asiatic Turkey.

Comba appears as a bishopric, a suffragan of the metropolitan see of Myra at a relatively late stage: it is not mentioned in the Notitia Episcopatuum of Pseudo-Epiphanius, composed during the reign of Emperor Heraclius (c. 640), and its bishops appear only in the second half of the 7th century. The first is John, who participated in the Quinisext Council of 692. Bishop Constantine was at the Second Council of Nicaea in 787, while another Constantine was one of the fathers of the Council of Constantinople (879) that rehabilitated the patriarch Photios I of Constantinople.

A Notitia Episcopatuum of the 12th century still reports the presence of this diocese, even if it is not certain that at that time it still existed; the diocese certainly disappeared with the Turkish conquest of the next century.

No longer a residential bishopric, Comba is today listed by the Catholic Church as a titular see.

== Bishops ==
- John (mentioned in 692)
- Constantine (mentioned in 787)
- Constantine (II) (mentioned in 879)

== Titular bishops ==
- Tarcisius Henricus Josephus van Valenberg, OFM Cap. (December 10, 1934 - December 18, 1984)
