= Marmara (Lycia) =

Ancient Lycian town

Coordinates: 36°39′21″N 30°28′50″E

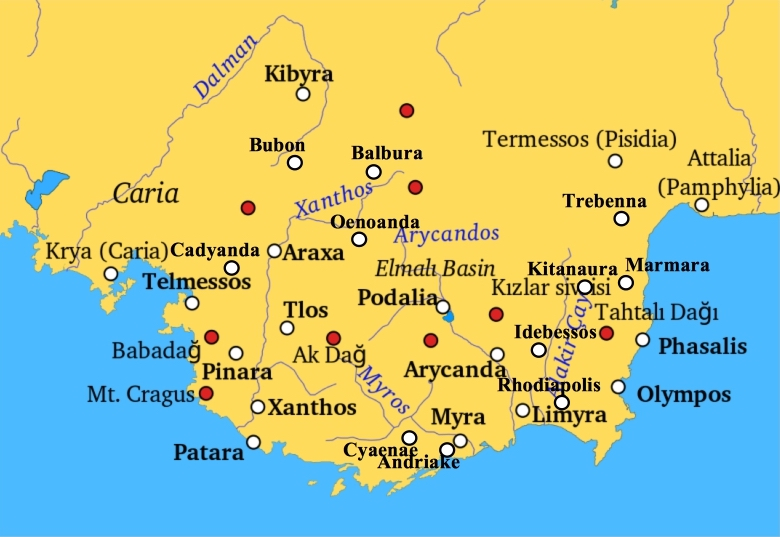
Cities of ancient Lycia. Red dots: mountain peaks, white dots: ancient cities

Marmara was a town of ancient Lycia, whose inhabitants put up a ferocious defense to Alexander the Great during his invasion. The name does not appear in history, but the ethnonym is cited by Diodorus Siculus. The town's territory is called Mnarike (Ancient Greek: Μναρική) in the Stadiasmus Patarensis, implying a town name of Mnara.

The identification of Mnara with Marmara has generally been accepted at the site of Kavak Daği where it extends over the top and slopes at 1350 m, behind Kemer. Excavations began in 2004 and are on-going.

== History ==
Marmara's warriors were very skilled and its fortresses were situated in impregnable positions. The site became part of the territory of Phaselis after Alexander's invasion and Marmara established a sympoliteia with Phaselis. It was an independent polis during the Hellenistic period.

It was the centre of the Mnarike region that is mentioned on the Miliarium Lyciae.

== Site ==
It is located on an extremely sheer and inaccessible rock acropolis with building remains on its slopes. No city walls have been found and, like Arycanda, only remains of a tower were seen overlooking both the sea and the valley.

Remains of a temple include reliefs and statue fragments of animals with paws and/or with hooves and unidentified male/deity figures. Its plan is reminiscent of those dedicated to Artemis at Neapolis and Kelbessos. A house altar uncovered at Rhodiapolis in 2007 states that it was dedicated to Artemis of Mnara and indicates that the temple there was dedicated to Artemis.

At the top of the settlement is a small bouleuterion overlooking Kemer and the Pamphylian sea. It is rectangular with eleven rows of seats. In front a platform on a strong terrace wall overlooks the entire panorama.

The rocky slope has remains of buildings and an agora is clearly visible. Further below is a large Hellenistic structure built from rectangular stone blocks with a large doorway and three windows and large cistern next to it. Water containers were filled here and next to the mouth of this cistern is a gargoyle-like stone which was used to return the excess water in order not to waste it.
