= Symbra =

Ancient settlement in Turkey

Symbra (Ancient Greek: Σύμβρα) was a town in the west of ancient Lycia, located near to Comba.

Its site is unlocated.
