= Lara, Antalya =

District of Antalya, Turkey

Coordinates: 36.8492°N 30.8129°E

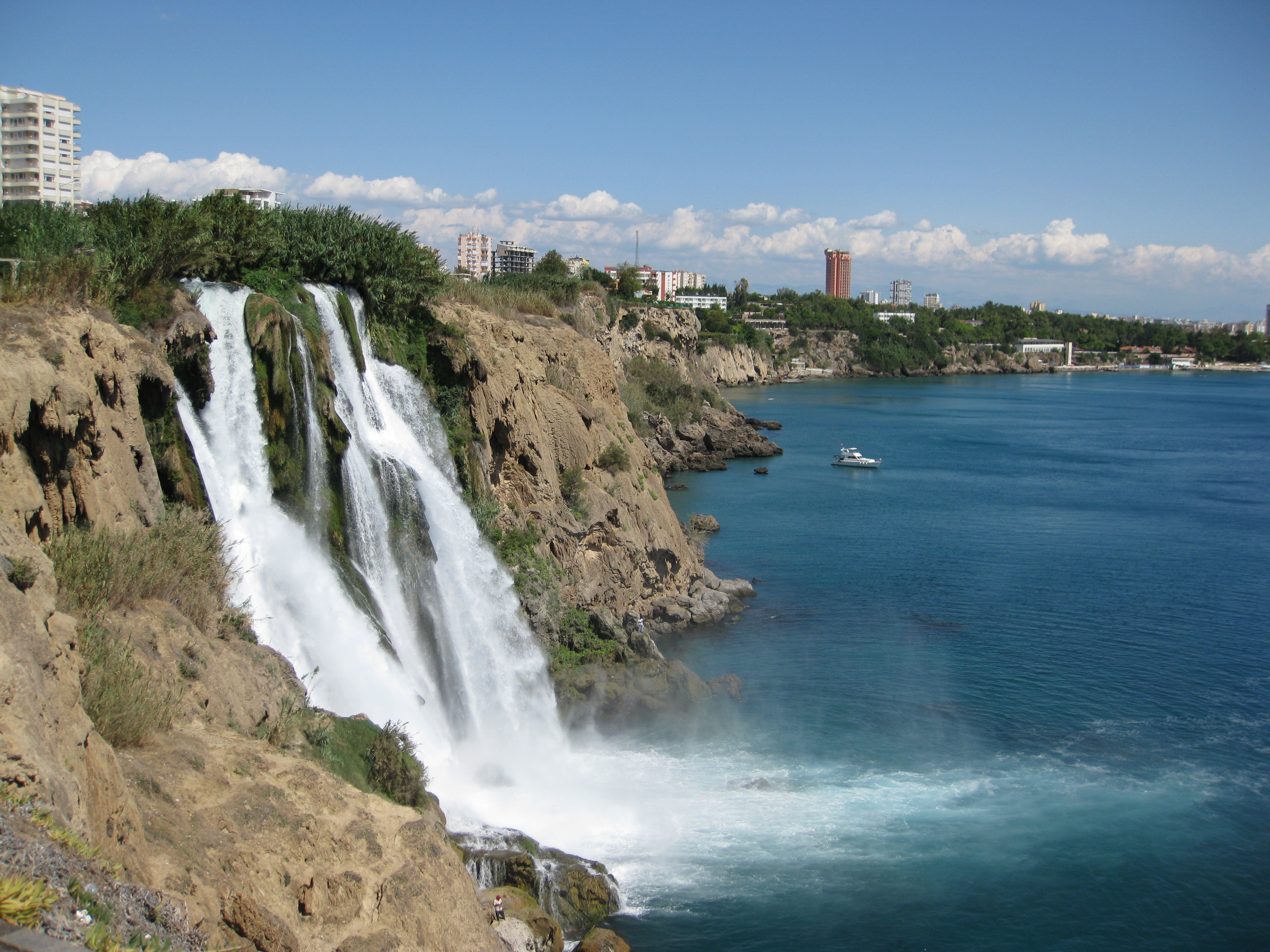
Antalya Lara Türkiye

Lara is a district of Antalya city, Turkey. Lara is a balneoclimatic and balneoclimateric location bordering the Mediterranean Sea. It is home to many luxury-themed hotels, mainly at the popular Lara Beach area which includes the Aksu and Muratpaşa municipalities of Antalya province. Most of the hotels are replicas of famous places around the world, luxury design hotels and theme hotels (for example Topkapi Palace, Venice Palace, Kremlin Palace, Titanic Beach Lara, Concorde De Luxe Resort) with All inclusive concept.

"Lara" is Luwian for sand.

== Beach ==
Lara Beach, together with Konyaaltı Beach, is one of the two important beaches of Antalya.

Lara Beach is one of the longest sand beaches and popular beach holiday destination with Blue Flag, Beach clubs, water sports centers and hotel zone in Turkey. It is host to a yearly sand art competition named Sandland.
