= Sandland (Antalya) =

Annual international sand art festival held in Turkey

Sandland Uluslararası Antalya Kum Heykel Festivali
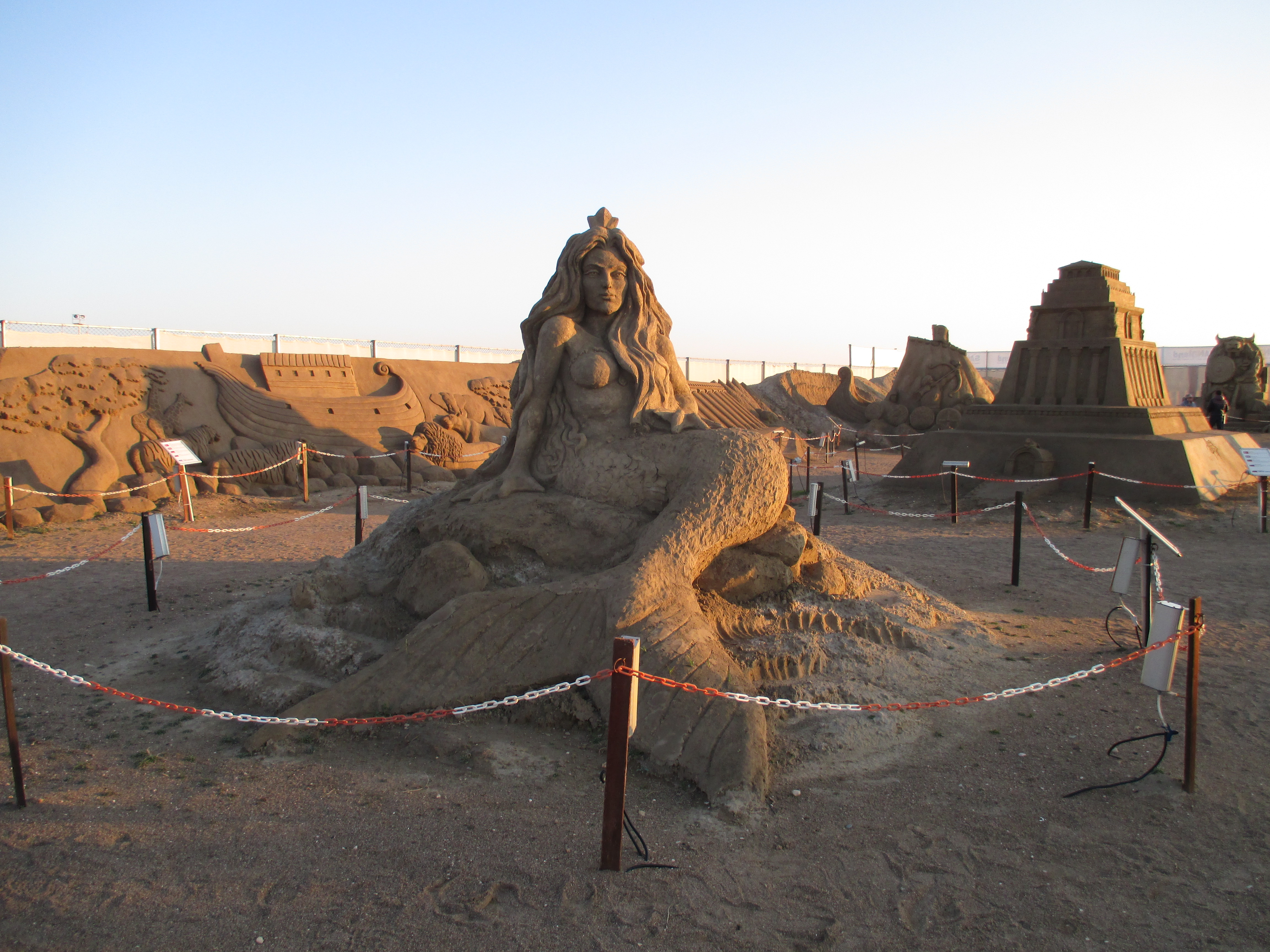
- The Mermaid, a sand sculpture at Sandland 2015.
- Status: active
- Frequency: annually
- Venue: Lara Beach
- Location: Antalya
- Coordinates: 36°51′04″N 30°50′43″E
- Country: Turkey
- Years active: 20
- Area: 7,000–10,000 m^{2} (75,000–108,000 sq ft)
- Major events: Sand art

Sandland (Turkish: Uluslararası Antalya Kum Heykel Festivali) is an international sand art festival held annually in Antalya, southern Turkey. It was established in 2006.

Established in 2006, Sandland is held annually at Lara Beach of Antalya, stretching over an area of 7,000–10,000 m^{2} (75,000–108,000 sq ft). Each year, a different theme is chosen for the sculptures. Visitors are allowed to watch during the creation of sand sculptures. More than ten sand sculptors from around eight to ten countries all over the world create sand sculptures in nearly three weeks. The sculptures are made durable for a time period of twelve months. The sculptures are illuminated in the darknes so that access is allowed also in the night.

Admission tickets are at ₺ 30.00 (US$7.00) for adults and ₺ 15.00 (US$3.00) for children of age 3–12. Discounts are available for students and seniors. Visiting hours are 9:30 - 23:00 between 1 May and 31 October, and from 9:00 to 19:00 between 1 November and 30 April.
