= Trebenna =

Archaeological site in Antalya Province, Turkey

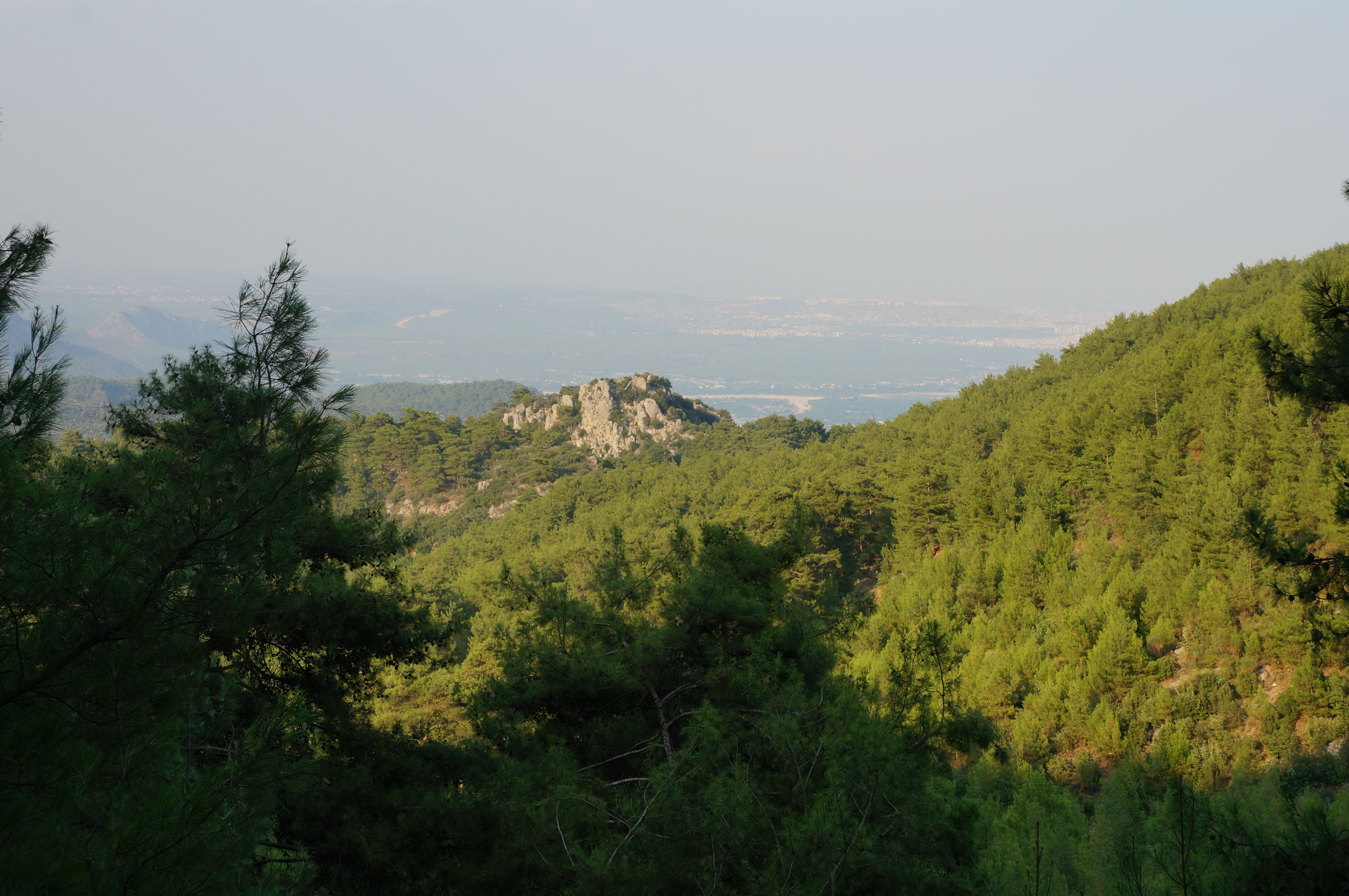
- Ancient City of Trebenna, View of the Acropolis

- Location within Turkey
- 36°51′57″N 30°28′35″E
- Type: Settlement
- Location: Çağlarca, Konyaaltı, Antalya Province, Turkey
- Region: Lycia

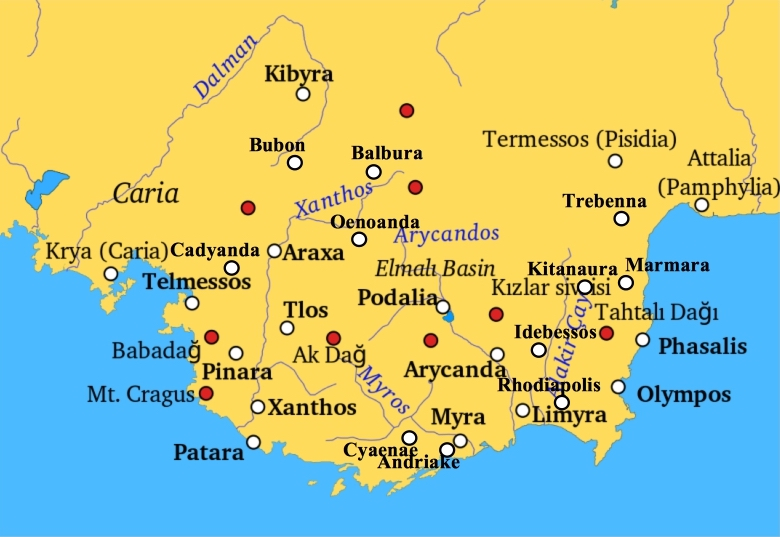
Cities of ancient Lycia

Trebenna (Τρεβέννα) or Trabenna (Τραβέννα) was a city in ancient Lycia, at the border with Pamphylia, and at times ascribed to that latter region. Its ruins are located east of the modern town Çağlarca in the Konyaaltı district of Antalya Province, Turkey. The site lies 22 km to the west of Antalya.

== History ==
The city's name is only known through coins and inscriptions. The name is mentioned for the first time in history on the Stadiasmus Patarensis, a Roman milestone excavated at Patara and dating from 45/46 AD in the reign of Claudius. There is no evidence for the existence of the city during the Hellenistic period. Under Roman rule the city was part of the Lycian League.

The only coins excavated at the site bear the image of Gordian III, who granted the city the right to mint coins. An inscription dated to 278/279 AD states that the city was designated as a Roman colony during the rule of Terentius Marcianus, the governor of the Roman province of Lycia-Pamphylia at that time. Under the Byzantine Empire the city became part of Pamphylia.

== Excavation history ==
Trebenna was discovered by Karol Lanckoroński. In 1882 he joined a scientific expedition to Lycia with the goal of describing many sites which were either completely unknown or poorly researched at the time. He provided a brief description of the city in a publication of the expedition's discoveries in 1892.

== Layout ==
The ruins of the city lie on a small hill and are surrounded by an early Byzantine wall. They extend over a wide area, bounded by the slopes of Sivridağ to the south and the acropolis to the north. The site was divided into the acropolis, the city centre, necropoli and the extramural areas.

Within the walled area many inscriptions and sarcophagi were found. It contains the ruins of Roman baths and an early Byzantine basilica. The Roman baths are notable for their relatively large size and high quality in a smaller city as Trebenna. With a size of 302 m^{2} (423 m^{2} including the walls) they are comparable to the baths in the most important Lycian cities. An acropolis was added to the city in the middle Byzantine period. A middle Byzantine church is located near it.

Images from Trebenna

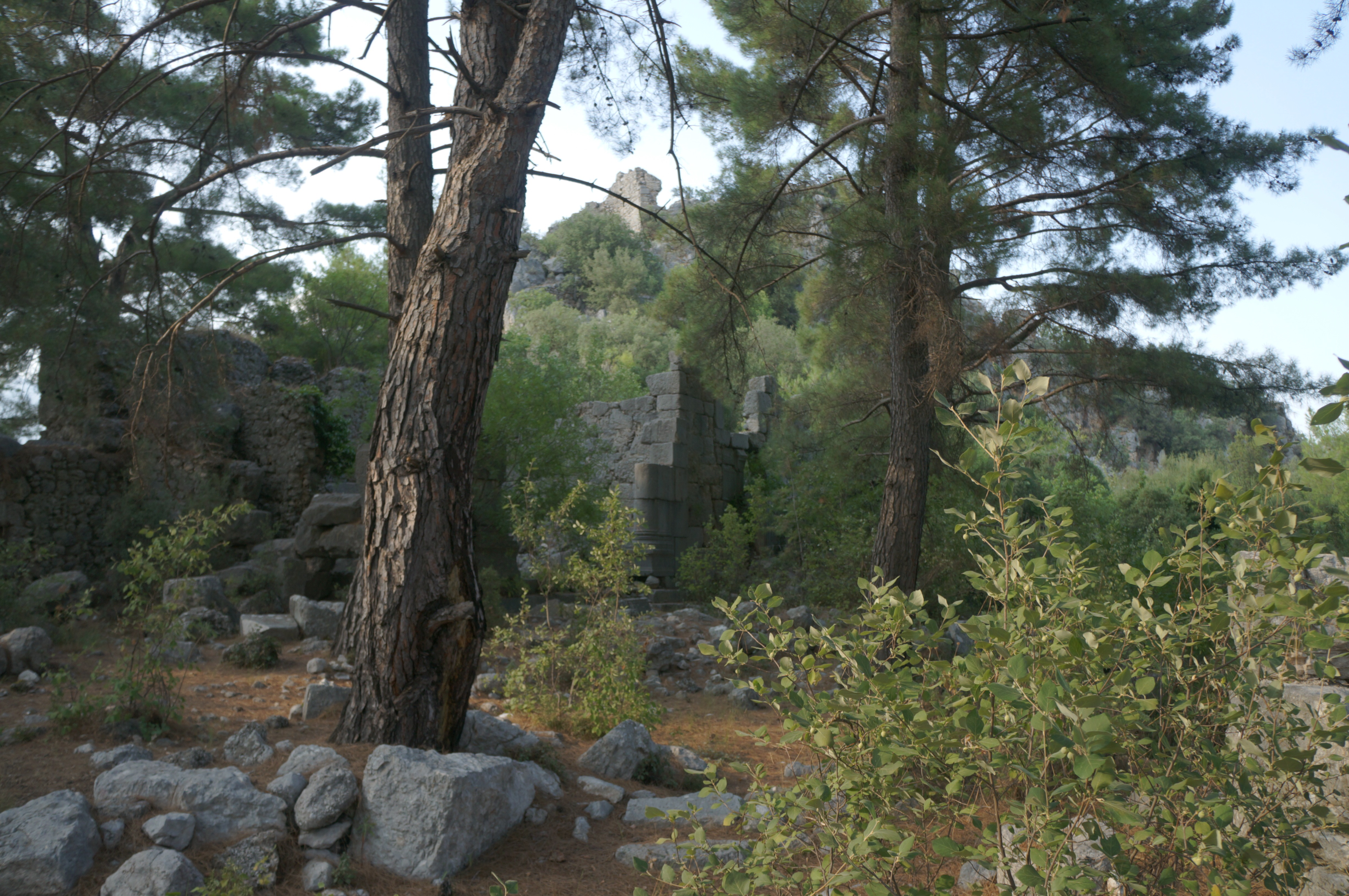
Lower part of Trebenna.

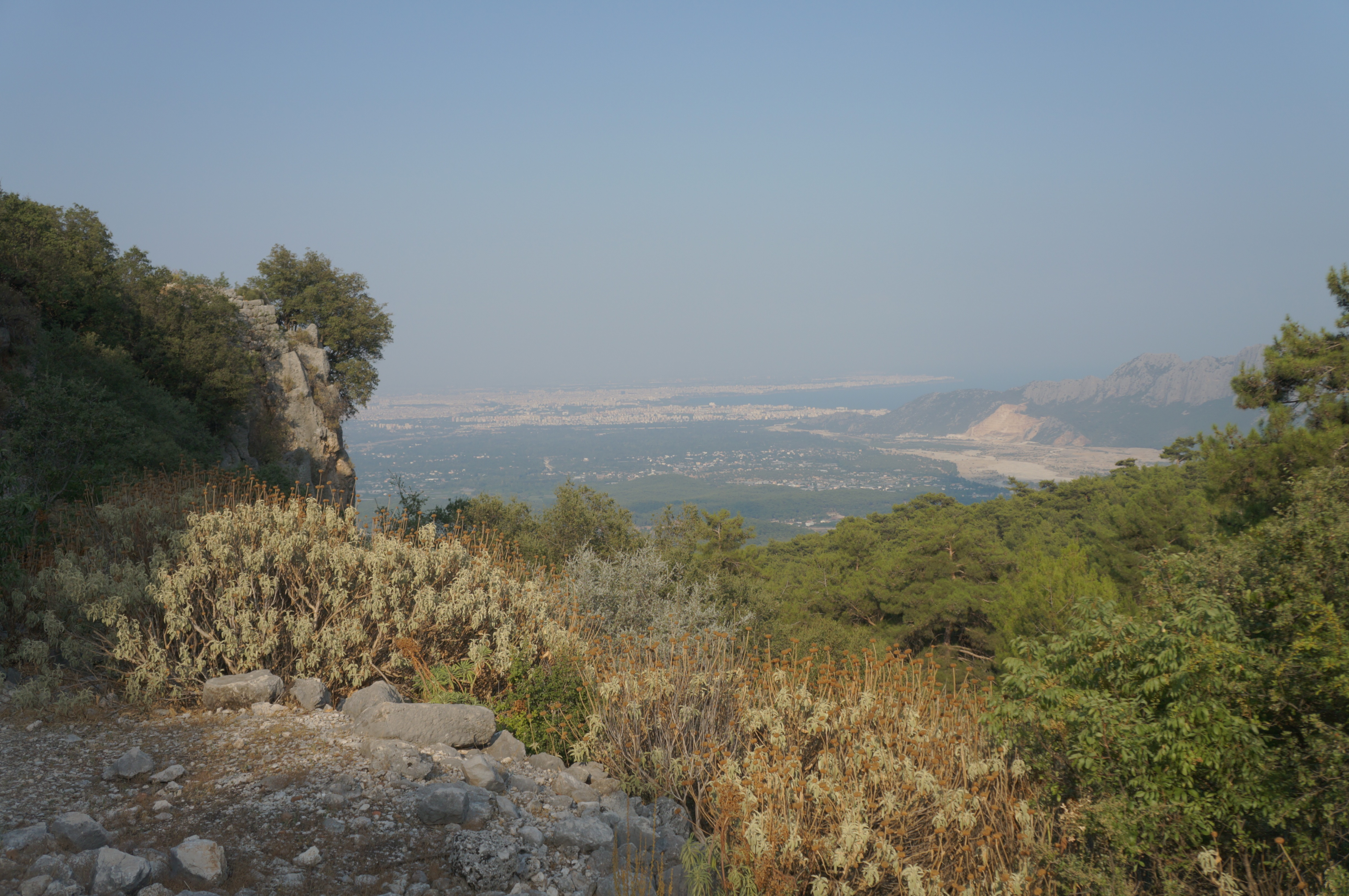
View of Antalya and the Gulf of Antalya from the Acropolis

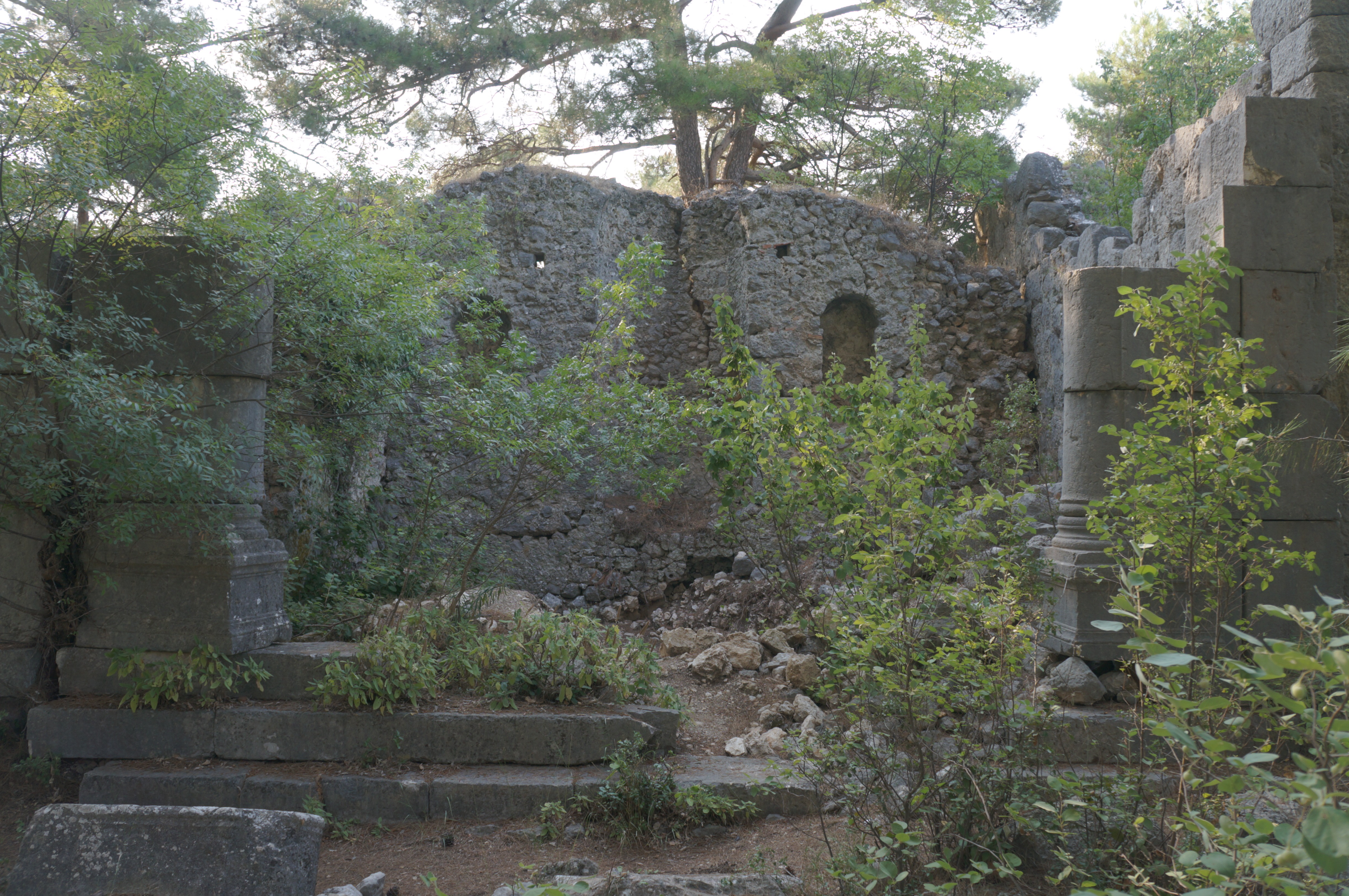
A Byzantine one-room church.

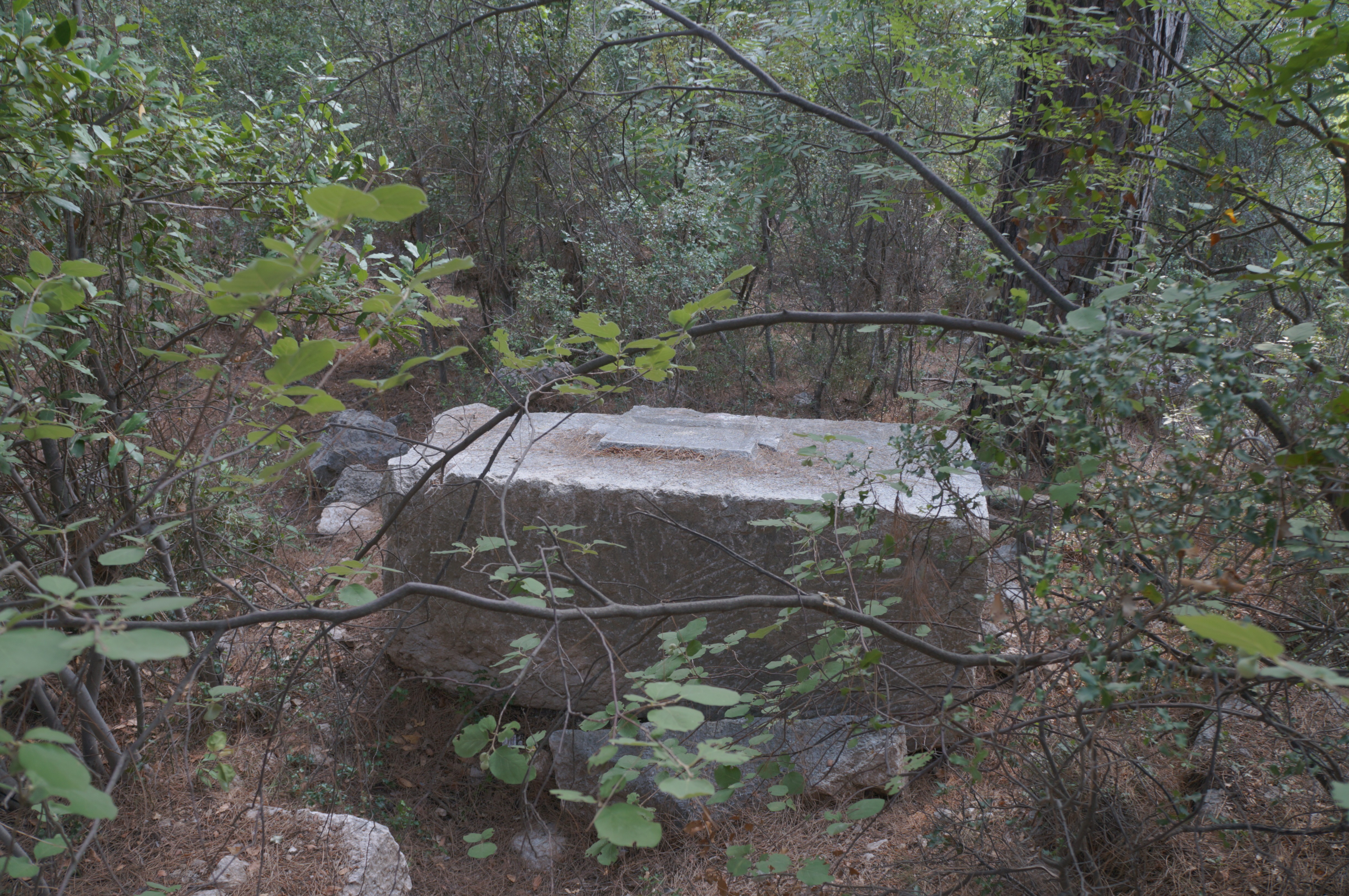
A vandalized sarcophagus.

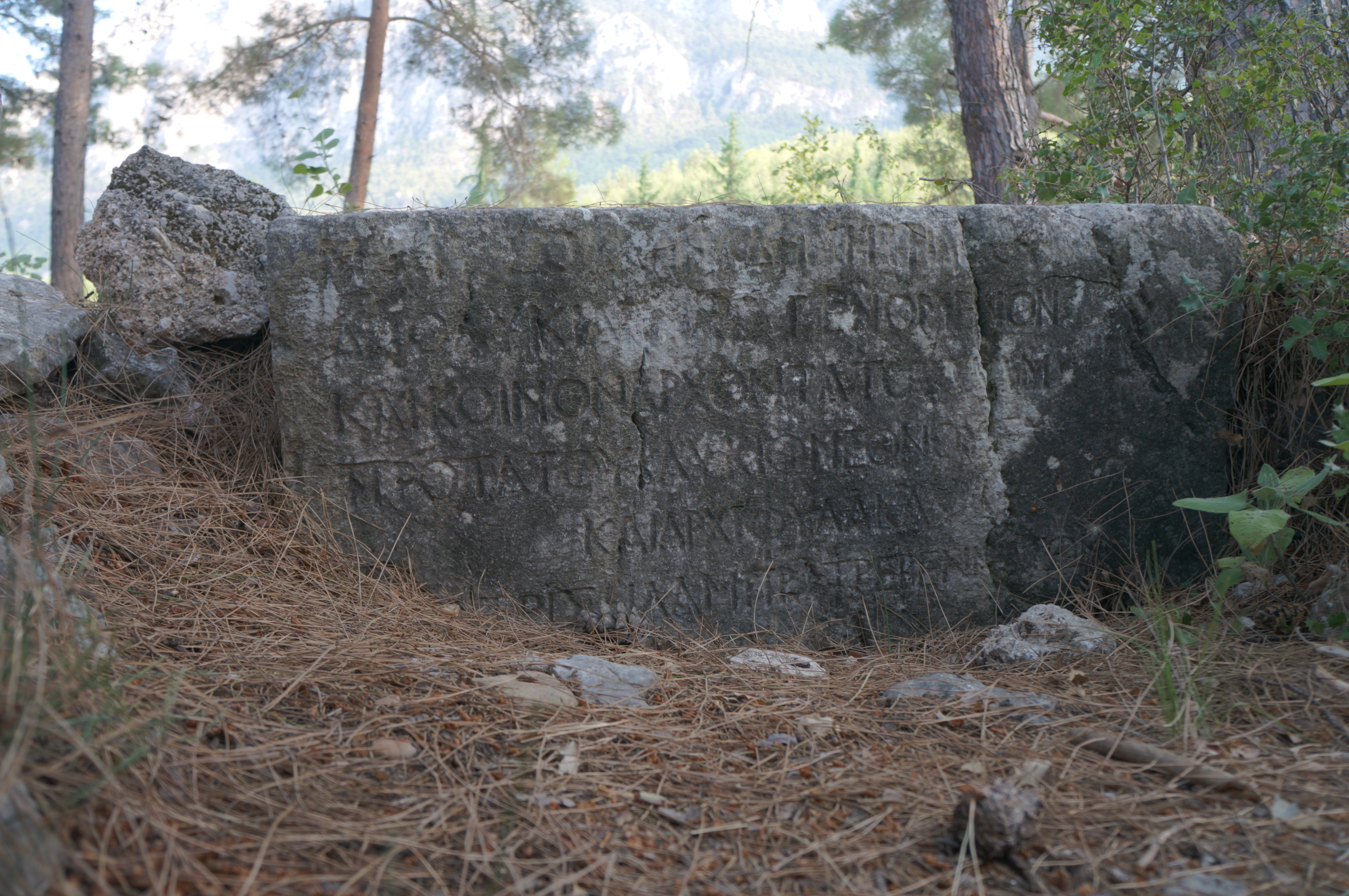
Greek inscriptions.

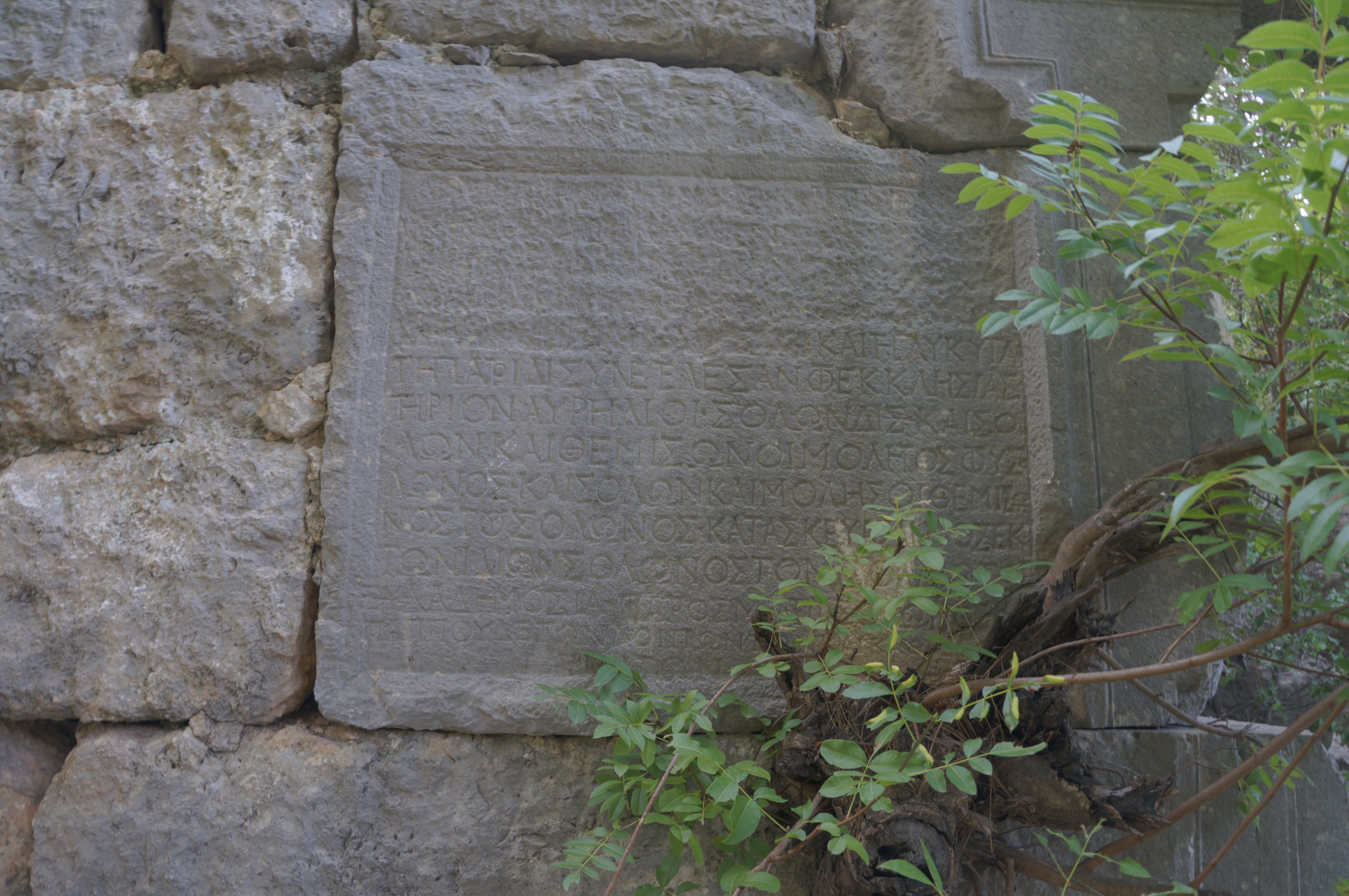
Greek inscription.

== Sources ==
- Çevik, Nevzat; Varkıvanç, Burhan (2004). "An Evaluation of the Roman Rural Baths of Lycia in the Light of Two New Examples from Trebenna and Typallia". Adalya. 7: 223–250.
- Çevik, Nevzat; Varkıvanç, Burhan; Akyürek, Engin, eds. (2005). Trebenna: Its History, Archaeology and Natural Environment. Adalya Supplementary Series (in Turkish and English). Vol. 1. Istanbul: Suna & İnan Kıraç Research Institute on Mediterranean Civilizations. ISBN 9789757078289.
- Lanckoroński, Karl Grafen (1892). Stadte Pamphyliens und Pisidiens. Vol. 2. Vienna: F. Tempsky.
