= Geyikbayırı, Konyaaltı =

Geyikbayırı
- Neighbourhood
- Location in Turkey
- Coordinates: 36°53′N 30°27′E
- Country: Turkey
- Province: Antalya
- District: Konyaaltı
- Population (2022): 662
- Time zone: UTC+3 (TRT)

Geyikbayırı is a neighbourhood of the municipality and district of Konyaaltı, Antalya Province, Turkey. Its population is 662 (2022). It is near the ancient city of Trebenna.
