= Yarbaşçandır, Konyaaltı =

Yarbaşçandır
- Neighbourhood
- Location in Turkey
- Coordinates: 36°45′16″N 30°24′48″E
- Country: Turkey
- Province: Antalya
- District: Konyaaltı
- Population (2022): 417
- Time zone: UTC+3 (TRT)

Yarbaşçandır is a neighbourhood of the municipality and district of Konyaaltı, Antalya Province, Turkey. Its population is 417 (2022).
