= Aşağıkaraman, Konyaaltı =

Aşağıkaraman
- Neighbourhood
- Location in Turkey
- Coordinates: 36°55′N 30°34′E
- Country: Turkey
- Province: Antalya
- District: Konyaaltı
- Population (2022): 1,577
- Time zone: UTC+3 (TRT)

Aşağıkaraman is a neighbourhood of the municipality and district of Konyaaltı, Antalya Province, Turkey. Its population is 1,577 (2022).
