= Pydnae =

Ancient fortress on the Mediterranean coast of Turkey

Coordinates: 36.333176°N 29.231701°E

- Pydnai (Turkish); Πύδναι (Ancient Greek)
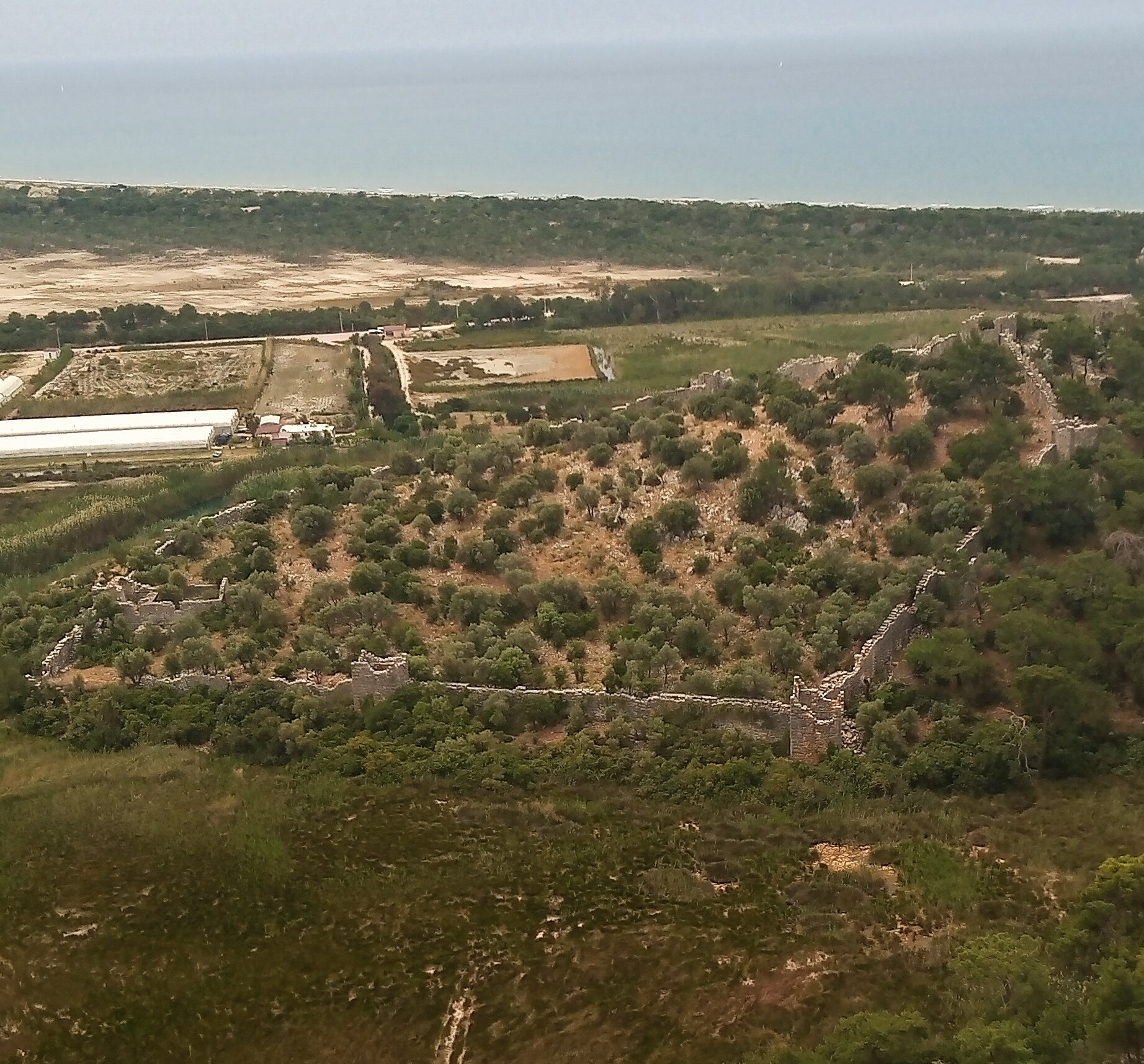
- The site, with Patara Beach in the background
- Interactive map of Pydnae
- Type: fort
- Location: western end of Patara Beach
- Region: Muğla, Turkey

Site notes
- Area: 4 acres (1.6 ha)
- Condition: Ruined
- Public access: Yes

Pydnae (Turkish: Pydnai; Ancient Greek: Πύδναι) (Note: Also referred to as or Kydna or Cydna, Kydnai, and Pydna. The local Turkish name used for the ruins is Gâvurağli ("Infidel's Fold").) is the site of an abandoned Hellenistic fort on the coast of ancient Lycia in Asiatic Turkey between the River Xanthus and Cape Hieron. It was built to defend the road from the coast to Xanthos, then the most important city in Lycia, and was well placed, being near to fresh water supplies and a safe landing area for shipping. During the period when the fort was controlled by the Romans, it was mentioned in the 3rd century Stadiasmus Maris Magni, and listed by Ptolemy in his Geography. During the Byzantine period, the defensive walls were used to protect the local Christian population from raiders.

The ruins, rediscovered by European archaeologists during the first half of the 19th century, consist of a complete circuit of walls, 11 towers and seven sets of steps that lead up to the battlements. The remains of a Byzantine church are also visible. The Lycian Way, a long-distance hiking trail, passes through Pydnae.

== History ==
Pydnae was a Hellenistic fort on the coast of ancient Lycia, which was situated near the mouth of the River Őzlen. The earliest surviving descriptions of the place are in the anonymous 3rd century Stadiasmus Maris Magni, a Roman guidebook for sailors, and in Ptolemy's Geography (5.3.5), written in the 2nd century, when it was referred to as Kydna.

The River Xanthos estuary

The fort was built to protect the coast closest to Xanthos, the most important city in Lycia. Situated close to a mountainous promontory, the location protected ships from the dangerously strong winds and currents of the Lycian coast. The nearby small stream flowing into the sea would have been valuable as a fresh water source, which is not very common on the coasts here. Geomorphological studies have shown that Pydnae was originally on the edge of the coast, as was the nearby fort of Bükses. Both forts acted as a form of coastal defence. (Note: The remains of the fort of Bükses is near Karadere, 100 metres (330 ft) from the road that passes through the village. The surviving ruins consist of 5–6 metres (16–20 ft) high walls, built from large stones. The fort, which has not been excavated, has been dated to the 5th century.)

Both the fort and the swampy region between Xanthos and the sea acted to protect the city. In the late Roman period, Xanthos was connected to the shore by means of an important road that circumnavigated the swamp, the presence of which is indicated by a 3rd century military boundary stone in the nearby village of Karadere. The road connected the anchorage near Pydnae with Xanthos and nearby Letoon.

There is a Byzantine church in Pydnae, indicating that the fort was once to protect the local Christian population.

=== Discovery ===
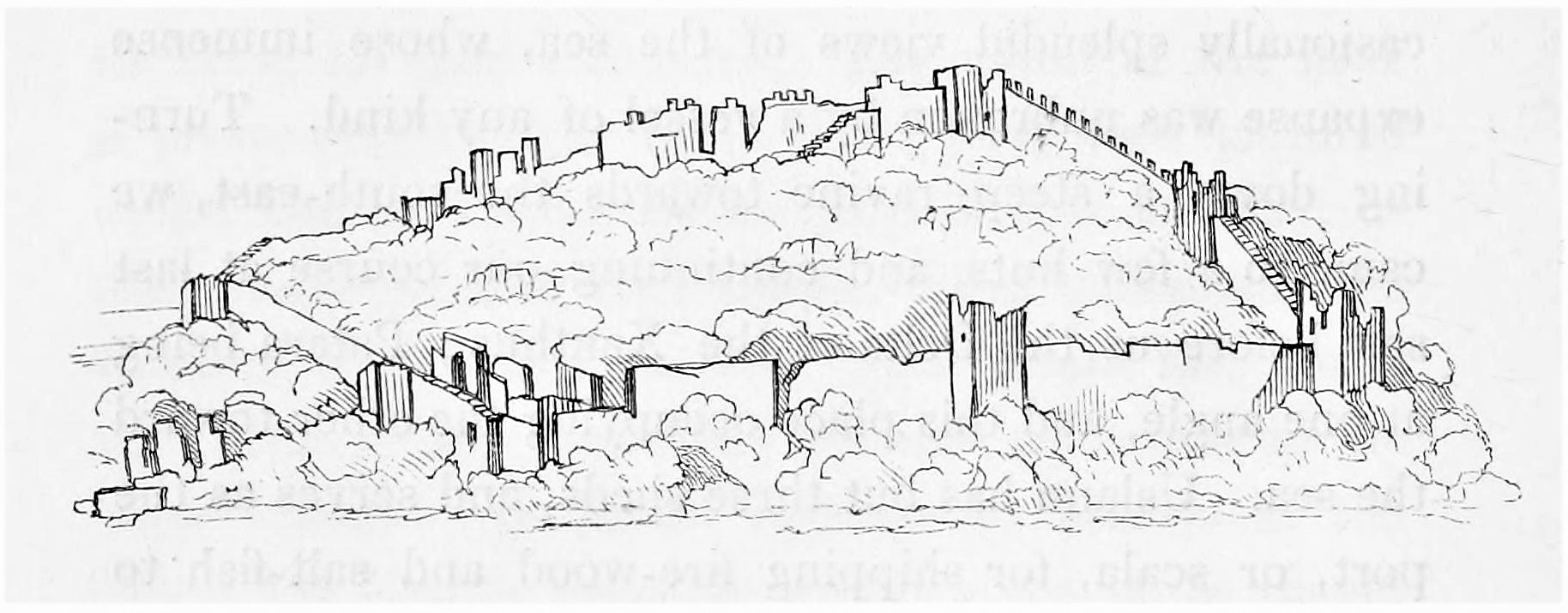
Charles Fellows's illustration of Pydnae (1841)

The site's existence was first mentioned in the modern period by the Irish hydrographer Francis Beaufort in 1811. On the basis of information provided by Beaufort, the ruins were discovered by the British explorer Charles Fellows, who was to lead archaeological expeditions to Lycia in 1838, 1839, 1841, and 1844. Fellows reported his discovery and provided an account of the ruins in his An Account of Discoveries in Lycia, Being a Journal kept during a Second Excursion in Asia Minor (1841), describing the hillside as "fortified with a beautifully built Cyclopean wall, with towers and loopholes, and showing a fine specimen of an ancient Greek fortification". Within the walls, Fellows found an inscription, and translated it as "To Poseidon; the vow of Mausolus, the Alabarches". He produced a sketch of the site. (Note: The inscription was searched for in the 1940s, but it was not found.)

Pydnae was also identified by Charles Texier, who led a French archaeological expedition to Asia Minor in 1835.

In 1842 the British Army officer William Martin Leake recognised the fortification as Pydnae. The fort was described by the explorers Edward Forbes and Thomas Abel Brimage Spratt in the same decade:

From the theatre we rode across a very flat marshy plain, to a short but deep and sluggish stream, called the Uzlan river, which, like many of the streams of the lower part of Lycia, springs full grown out of the base of the mountains. It runs a course of about three miles, and there is a bridge built over it. Uzlan is a small scala (Note: A scala (Italian: scala ("stairs")) is a landing stage.) of two or three houses, and a rendezvous for Greek sailors. Near it are some massive hellenic walls, as if fortifying a point of rock. Beyond it is the fortress described and well figured by Fellows as Cydna. It is beautifully built, and in fine preservation. The walls are crowned with battlements, which, however, are not part of the original architecture, but subsequent additions, constructed apparently during the middle ages. In the original wall the Cyclepsean and regular styles are mingled. Loop-holes are placed at intervals. Within this fine fortress are the remains of a Christian church.

— Edward Forbes; Thomas Abel Brimage Spratt, Travels in Lycia, Milyas, and the Cibyratis, in company with the Late E. T. Daniell (1847)

The English lexicographer William Smith suggested in 1870 that the settlement was referred to by Ptolemy as Cydna, who placed it at the foot of Mount Cragus.

== Archaeology ==
The German archaeologists Otto Benndorf and George Niemann were among those 19th–century scholars who published a description of the ruins at Pyndae. They recorded that the fortress had one entrance on the east side and another on the north; the towers had doors, an upper floor accessible from the wall parapet, and loopholes. They observed that at seven places around the perimeter there were narrow steep stairs up to the wall. The undergrowth made it difficult for them to explore the interior, and they found no remains of occupation, except the ruins of a church in the east corner. The church, a small east-facing basilica with a nave that was measured to be 15 feet (4.6 m) wide, and made of rubble with mortar. The archaeologists failed to find the inscriptions said to have been seen by Fellows.

The French archaeologist Jean-Pierre Adam has shown that a tower at Xanthos resembles the stonework at Pydnae, which he dates to the 3rd century BC, and has attributed the same date to most of the Xanthos rampart. However, according to the French archaeologist Jacques Des Courtils, the sites have notable differences: Pydnae was built in one homogeneous phase, but the tower at Xanthos shows evidence of having undergone alterations at different times. Des Courtils notes that at Xanthos there is both a semi-circular tower and a round tower, and that those at Pydnae are quadrangular. He speculates that Pydnae was built in the 2nd century (when the round tower of Xanthos was constructed), and suggests that Pydnae may have been part of an important defence program, that included the reinforcing or restoring of the defences of Xanthos and the building of a new fort located near the shore.

Based on evidence from construction techniques, the Turkish archaeologist Cevdet Bayburtluoğlu has dated the fortification to the 1st century or first part of the 2nd century AD. There is also evidence of an aqueduct at Pydnae. The fort's inscriptions are Byzantine.

== Description ==
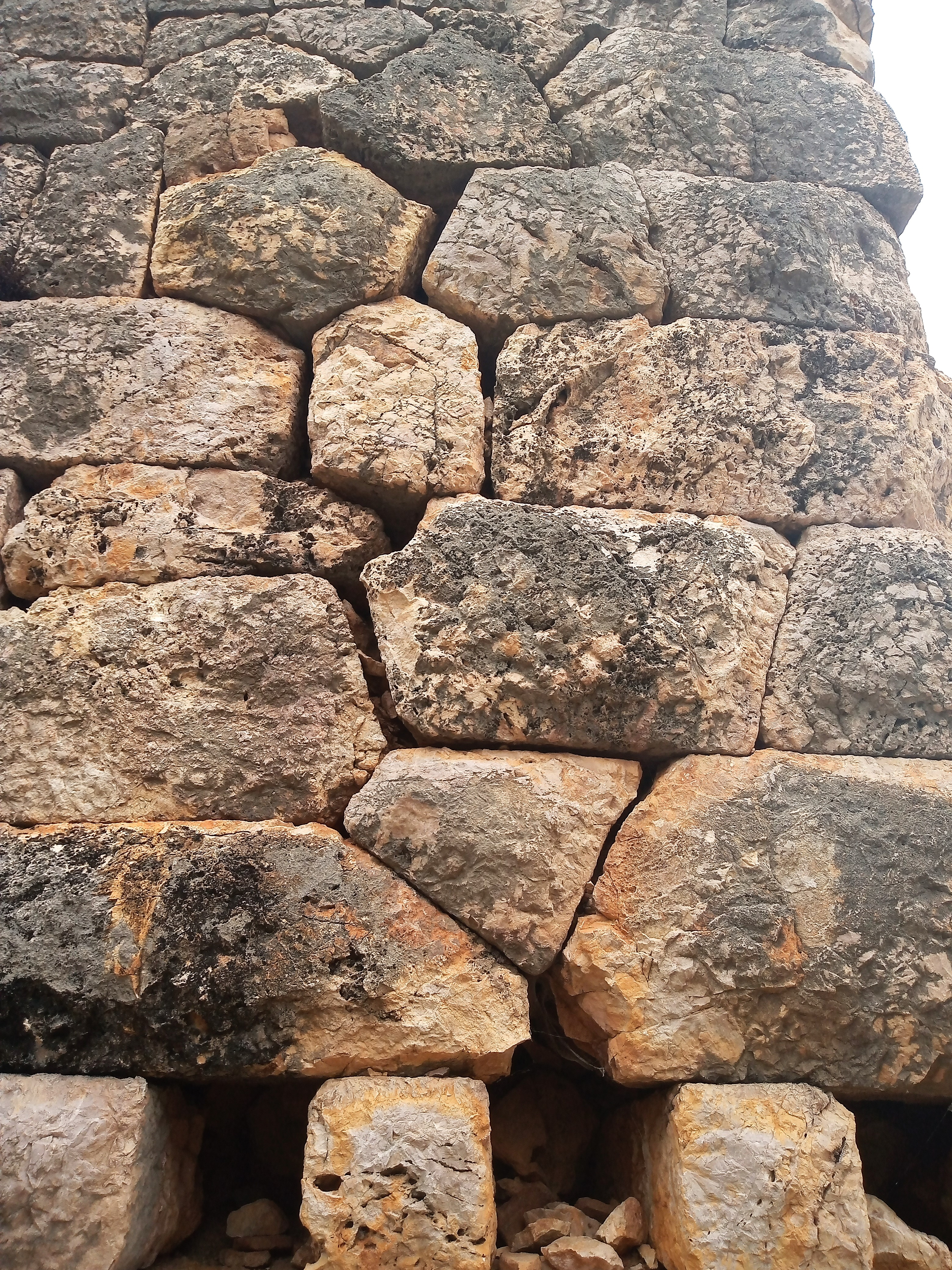
Polygonal stonework at Pydnae

Pydnae has a total area of 4 acres (1.6 ha). It is located close to the western end of Patara Beach, on the side of a low hill. The defensive walls of the fort-like structure are 3 feet (0.91 m) thick, and more than 300 metres (980 ft) long. Some of the 11 towers and seven stairways are more than 10 metres (33 ft) high. The walls are still in a good condition, with battlements and a parapet still extant. All the walls are constructed using close fitting polygon-shaped blocks; the only building in the interior is a small church.

The walls at Pydnae are built from closely-fitting polygonal stonework, a form of construction often used in the defensive walls of Lycian cities. It is not usually possible to date such walls, but those at Pydnae have been considered to have coincided with similarly built walls at Xanthos, allowing a tentative suggestion of a date during the rule of Ptolemy II Philadelphus (283–246 BCE), a period when Lycia, like all the southern coasts of Asia Minor, was ruled by the Egyptian Ptolemies.

The Lycian Way, a 540 kilometres (340 mi) way-marked footpath around the coast of Lycia from Fethiye to Antalya, passes through the two entrances to Pydnae. The area away from the path, both around and within the site, is overgrown with trees and bushes.

== Sources ==
- Bayburtluoğlu, Cevdet (2004). Lycia. Antalya: Suna & İnan Kıraç Research Institute on Mediterranean Civilizations. ISBN 978-97570-7-820-3.
- Bean, George Ewart (1978). Lycian Turkey: An Archaeological Guide. London: Benn. ISBN 978-05100-3-205-0.
- Benndorf, Otto; Niemann, George (1884). Reisen in Lykien und Karien (in German). Vienna: C. Gerold's Sohn. OCLC 312437440.
- Clow, Kate (2000). The Lycian Way. Ankara: Upcountry (Turkey) Ltd. ISBN 978-09539-2-180-5.
- Des Courtils, Jacques (1994). "Nouvelles données sur le rempart de Xanthos". Revue des Études Anciennes (in French). 96 (1–2). Istanbul: 285–298. ISSN 2540-2544.
- Des Courtils, Jacques (2003). Ksanthos ve Letoon Rehberi. Dünya kültür mirası kentlerinden (in Turkish). Istanbul, Turkey: Ege Yayınları. ISBN 978-97580-7-056-5.
- Farrington, Andrew (1995). The Roman Baths of Lycia: An Architectural Study. British Institute at Ankara. ISBN 978-19120-9-066-2.
- Fellows, Charles (1841). An Account of Discoveries in Lycia, Being a Journal kept during a Second Excursion in Asia Minor. London: J. Murray. OCLC 1038777615.
- Forbes, Edward; Spratt, Thomas Abel Brimage (1847). Travels in Lycia, Milyas, and the Cibyratis, in company with the Late E. T. Daniell. Vol. 1. London: John van Voorst. LCCN 05010095.
- Slatter, Enid (1994). Xanthus: Travels of Discovery in Turkey. London: Rubicon Press. ISBN 978-09486-9-531-5.
- Smith, William (1870). Dictionary of Greek and Roman Geography. Vol. 2. Boston: Little, Brown. OCLC 847907716.
- Talbert, Richard J.A., ed. (2000). Barrington Atlas Map-by-Map Directory. Princeton, New Jersey: Princeton University Press. ISBN 978-06910-4-945-8.
