= Karatepe, Konyaaltı =

Karatepe
- Neighbourhood
- Country: Turkey
- Province: Antalya
- District: Konyaaltı
- Population (2022): 911
- Time zone: UTC+3 (TRT)

Karatepe is a neighbourhood of the municipality and district of Konyaaltı, Antalya Province, Turkey. Its population is 911 (2022). The village is inhabited by Tahtacı.
