= Bahtılı, Konyaaltı =

Bahtılı
- Neighbourhood
- Location in Turkey
- Coordinates: 36°53′N 30°36′E
- Country: Turkey
- Province: Antalya
- District: Konyaaltı
- Population (2022): 1,344
- Time zone: UTC+3 (TRT)

Bahtılı is a neighbourhood of the municipality and district of Konyaaltı, Antalya Province, Turkey. Its population is 1,344 (2022).
