= Akdamlar, Konyaaltı =

Akdamlar
- Neighbourhood
- Location in Turkey
- Coordinates: 36°52′N 30°31′E
- Country: Turkey
- Province: Antalya
- District: Konyaaltı
- Population (2022): 442
- Time zone: UTC+3 (TRT)

Akdamlar is a neighbourhood of the municipality and district of Konyaaltı, Antalya Province, Turkey. Its population is 442 (2022).
