= Üçoluk, Konyaaltı =

Üçoluk
- Neighbourhood
- Country: Turkey
- Province: Antalya
- District: Konyaaltı
- Population (2022): 227
- Time zone: UTC+3 (TRT)

Üçoluk is a neighbourhood of the municipality and district of Konyaaltı, Antalya Province, Turkey. Its population is 227 (2022).
