= Çitdibi, Konyaaltı =

Çitdibi
- Neighbourhood
- Location in Turkey
- Coordinates: 36°47′N 30°25′E
- Country: Turkey
- Province: Antalya
- District: Konyaaltı
- Population (2022): 103
- Time zone: UTC+3 (TRT)

Çitdibi is a neighbourhood of the municipality and district of Konyaaltı, Antalya Province, Turkey. Its population is 103 (2022).
