= Hisarçandır, Konyaaltı =

Hisarçandır
- Neighbourhood
- Location in Turkey
- Coordinates: 36°45′N 30°27′E
- Country: Turkey
- Province: Antalya
- District: Konyaaltı
- Population (2022): 714
- Time zone: UTC+3 (TRT)

Hisarçandır is a neighbourhood of the municipality and district of Konyaaltı, Antalya Province, Turkey. Its population is 714 (2022).
