= Octapolis =

Ancient city of Caria

Coordinates: 36°48′55″N 28°55′48″E

Octapolis or Oktapolis (Ancient Greek: Ὀκτάπολις) was a city of ancient Caria or Lycia. Per the Stadiasmus Patarensis it included the town of Lyrnai as one of eight constituent settlements implied by the name "8-city". It is noted by Ptolemy.

Its site is located near Kızılkaya, Asiatic Turkey.
