= Çağlarca, Konyaaltı =

Çağlarca
- Neighbourhood
- Location in Turkey
- Coordinates: 36.8679°N 30.4586°E
- Country: Turkey
- Province: Antalya
- District: Konyaaltı
- Population (2022): 335
- Time zone: UTC+3 (TRT)

Çağlarca is a neighbourhood of the municipality and district of Konyaaltı, Antalya Province, Turkey. Its population is 335 (2022).
