= Kelbessos =

Ancient Lycian settlement

Coordinates: 36°53′43″N 30°26′20″E

Kelbessos was a fortified settlement of ancient Lycia, in the territory of Termessos. It was continually inhabited by a military garrison from Hellenistic to Roman times.

Its site is located in the Bey Mountains of Asian Turkey. Excavations have discovered coins, necropoleis, and inscriptions, and are on-going.
