= Alakilise =

Ruined Byzantine church in Antalya, Turkey

Coordinates: 36.33006°N 30.00256°E

Alakilise or Church of the Angel Gabriel is a church ruin in Lycia, Turkey near Finike and Demre in Antalya Province. It is situated ca. 860 meter above sea-level at the southern flanks of Alaca Dağ. Now only one of the walls of the church stands. The church has served a sizeable village that probably was founded in the sixth century. The church itself is a sixth-century basilica which was rebuilt in the ninth century.

It is on the Lycian Way long-distance footpath.
