= Konyaaltı Beach =

Beach in Antalya, Turkey

- Beach
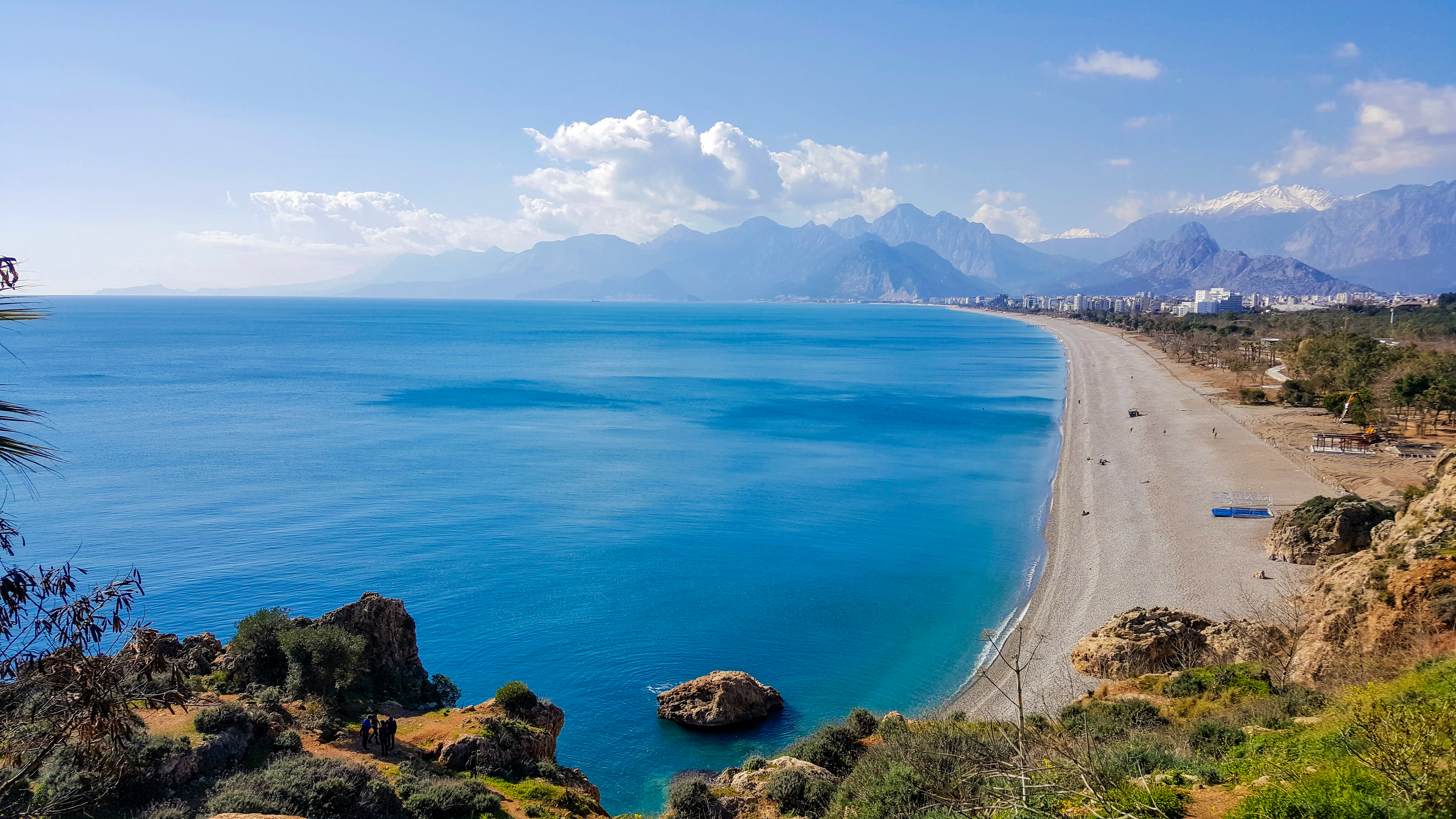
- Konyaaltı Beach as seen from the nearby cliffs. The Beydağları mountains can be seen in the background.
- Interactive map of Konyaaltı Beach
- Location: Turkey

Konyaaltı Beach (Turkish: Konyaaltı Plajı) is one of the two main beaches of Antalya, the other being Lara Beach.

The beach is located on the western side of the city and stretches for 13 km primarily composed of fine pebbles, but also has some sand. The water is beautifully clear. Konyaaltı Beach has "Blue Flag" status, which confirms the good water quality. It is bound inwards by the beach park and numerous bars, cafes, nightclubs and hotels. The 'Aqualand' waterpark along Dumlupınar Bulvarı is the other border.

== Facilities ==
The beach is patrolled by Lifeguards. The free of charge changing rooms and the showers are available for all visitors on the beach. The Antalya Metropolitan Municipality has established an accessible section of Konyaaltı Beach with adapted amenities for visitors with disabilities.

== Flora ==
The Turkish pine and shrubs of hibiscus grow along the beachfront.
