= Konyaaltı =

- District and municipality
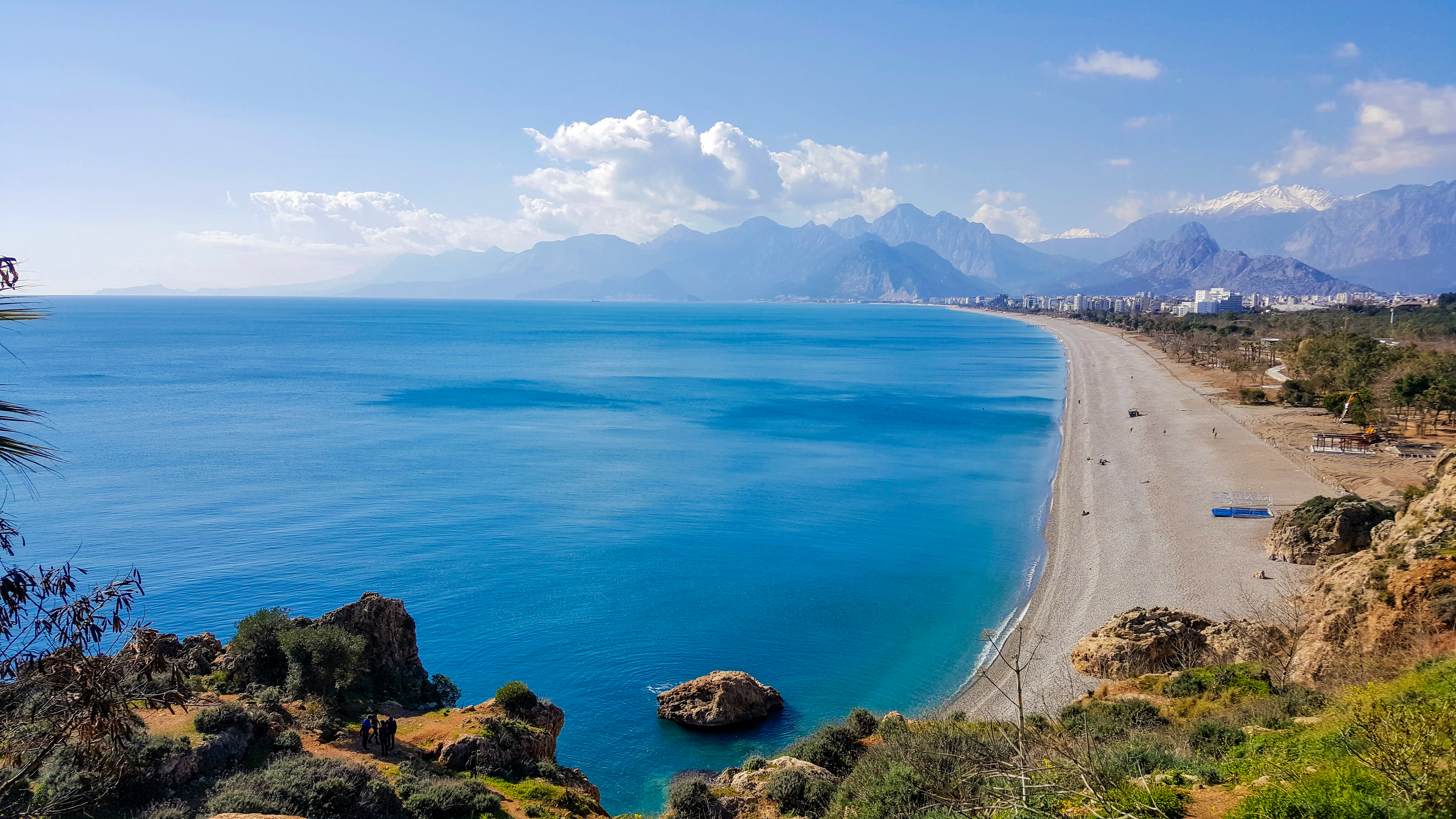
- Konyaaltı Beach

- Logo

- Map showing Konyaaltı District in Antalya Province

- Location within Turkey
- Coordinates: 36°50′20″N 30°28′52″E
- Country: Turkey
- Province: Antalya

Government
  - Mayor: Cem Kotan (CHP)
- Area: 546 km^{2} (211 sq mi)
- Population (2025): 199,414
  - Density: 365/km^{2} (946/sq mi)
- Time zone: UTC+3 (TRT)
- Postal code: 07070
- Area code: 0242
- Website: www.konyaalti.bel.tr

Konyaaltı is a municipality and district of Antalya Province, Turkey. Its area is 546 km^{2}, and its population is 199,414 (2025).

The name "Konyaaltı" (pronounced [konja.aɫtɯ]), originates from the expression of "koy altı", which in the Turkish language means "the bay under the cliffs". The district is situated beneath the cliffs of Antalya, and extends miles toward the west towards the mountains, with various kinds of beaches including sand and shingle. The water is a little cooler compared to other beaches in Antalya because of an underground creek flowing to the sea. There are modern underground facilities for aesthetic reasons. Transport is easy by means of buses. Destinations are reachable by foot as well but might be time-consuming. The area was started to be developed in the 80s and wasn't historically a part of Antalya's city center. The area originally was a rural/pastoral area and neighborhoods that are currently a part of it were originally villages such as Arapsuyu or Uncali. Until the 80s most of the area was mainly empty and villages had agricultural areas where they grew crops and grazed sheep. There are also many streams in the area which dried up when the area was urbanized. The area also has an ancient city named Olbia.

== Population ==
Historical population
Year	Pop.	±% p.a.
2008	92,126	—
2009	106,748	+15.87%
2010	117,999	+10.54%
2011	127,084	+7.70%
2012	131,513	+3.49%
2013	137,670	+4.68%
2014	145,648	+5.80%
2015	154,920	+6.37%
2016	164,332	+6.08%
2017	172,920	+5.23%
2018	182,112	+5.32%
2019	190,043	+4.36%
2020	189,078	−0.51%
2021	199,609	+5.57%
2022	204,795	+2.60%
2023	196,498	−4.05%
2024	196,079	−0.21%
2025	199,414	+1.70%
Source: TÜİK

== Composition ==
There are 39 neighbourhoods in Konyaaltı District:

- Akdamlar
- Akkuyu
- Altınkum
- Arapsuyu
- Aşağıkaraman
- Aydınlık
- Bahtılı
- Çağlarca
- Çakırlar
- Çitdibi
- Demircilik
- Doyran
- Doyran Çamlıbel
- Doyran Dağ
- Geyikbayırı
- Gökçam
- Gökdere
- Gürsu
- Hacısekililer
- Hisarçandır
- Hurma
- Karatepe
- Kırlı
- Kuruçay
- Kuşkavağı
- Liman
- Mollayusuf
- Öğretmenevleri
- Pınarbaşı
- Sarısu
- Siteler
- Suiçeceği
- Toros
- Üçoluk
- Uluç
- Uncalı
- Yarbaşçandır
- Yenimahalle
- Zümrüt

== Places of interest ==
- Kapuz Canyon,
- Konyaaltı Beach,
