= Stadiasmus Patarensis =

The Stadiasmus Patarensis, also known as the Stadiasmus Provinciae Lyciae and the Miliarium Lyciae, is an ancient Roman milliarium from the city of Patara. The stadiasmus, shaped as a pillar, served as a monumental public itinerarium. It has a Greek inscription with a dedication to Claudius and an official announcement of roads being built by the governor, Quintus Veranius Nepos, in the province of Lycia et Pamphylia, giving place names and distances. It was discovered in 1993. It has been dated to the year 46 AD.

== Sources ==
- Şahin, Sencer; Adak, Mustafa (2007). Stadiasmus Patarensis: Itinera Romana Provinciae Lyciae (in German). Istanbul: Ege Yayınları. ISBN 978-975-807-179-1.
- Stadiasmus Patarensis / 'The Monument of The Roads' at Patara from the website of The Research Centre for Mediterranean Languages and Cultures (RCMLC) at Akdeniz University, Antalya, Turkey.
