= Artembares (disambiguation) =

Artembares is a 6th century BCE man who features in a story of the youth of Cyrus the Great.

Artembares may also refer to:

- Cyrus, as an adolescent, having the son of Artembares whipped, a painting by 18th century French painter Hyacinthe Collin de Vermont depicting the anecdote above
- Artembares, a Persian man who is mentioned by Herodotus as having advised Cyrus the Great that the Persians should go to a better country
- Artembares, a Persian man mentioned by the playwright Aeschylus in his historical tragedy The Persians as having been killed at the Battle of Salamis in 480 BCE
- Artumpara, a noble of Lycian lineage who is mentioned in several ancient inscriptions and coins between the 5th and 4th centuries BCE
