= Mithrapata =

4th-century BC dynast of Lycia

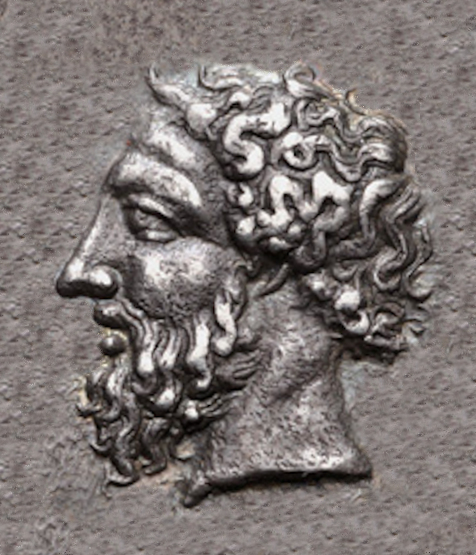
- Portrait of Mithrapata, from his coinage.
- Military career
- Allegiance: Achaemenid Empire
- Service years: fl. 390 – 370 BC
- Rank: Dynast of Lycia

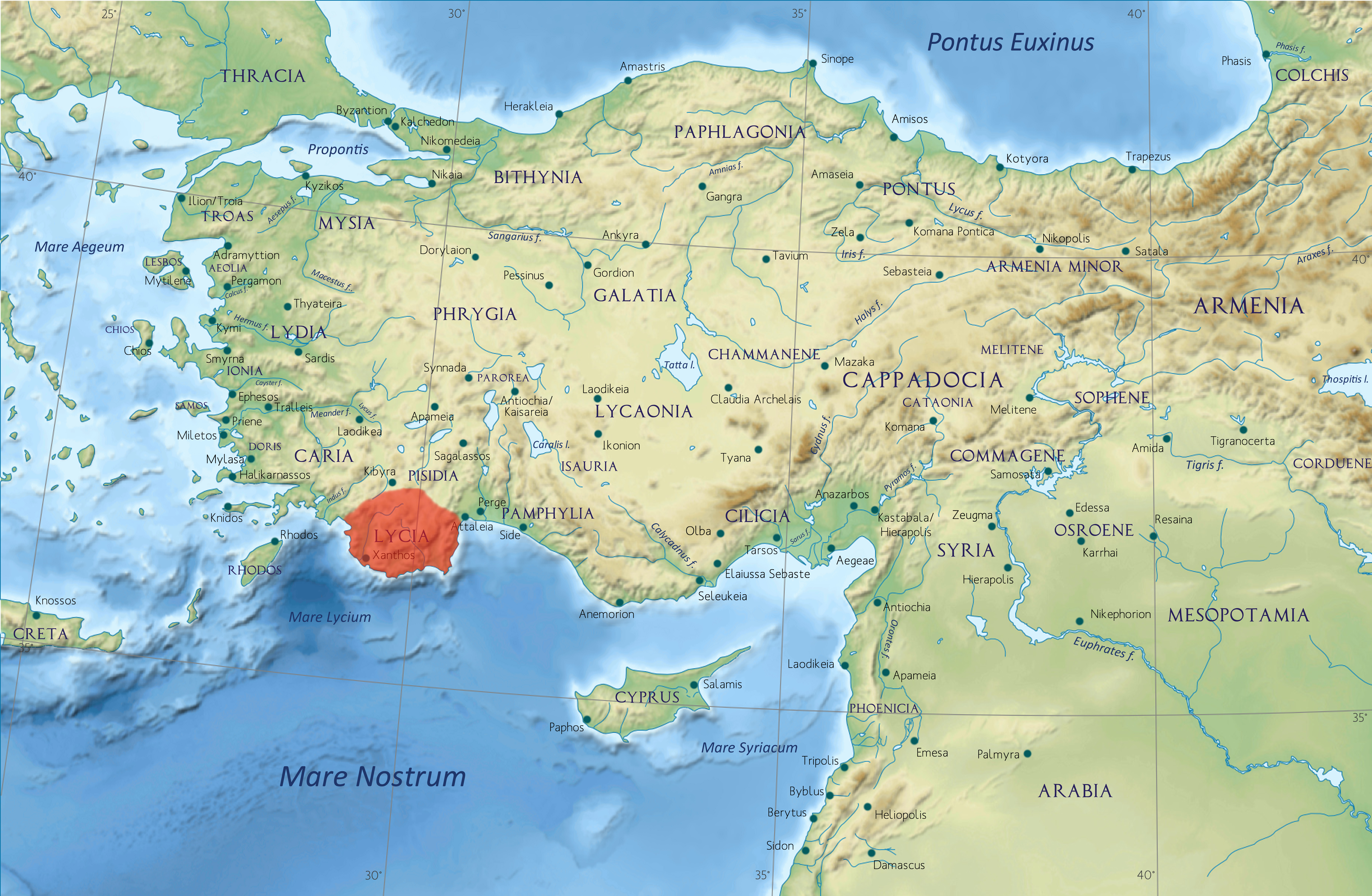
Lycia, shown coloured orange, in southern Anatolia in the Greco-Roman period

Mithrapāta (c. 390–370 BC) was dynast of Lycia in the early 4th century BC, at a time when this part of Anatolia was subject to the Persian, or Achaemenid, Empire.

Present-day knowledge of Lycia in the period of classical antiquity comes mostly from archaeology, in which this region is unusually rich. Believed to have been based at Antiphellus, Mithrapata is known to have competed for power with another man named Arttumpara.

The name of Mithrapata, which is of Persian origin, is known from Lycian coins and also from inscriptions. During the fifth and fourth centuries B.C., the Lycian nobility was using Persian names, so Mithrapata may have been one of them. However, it has also been suggested that he may have been a Persian sent to rule Lycia by Artaxerxes II.

== Coinage ==
Together with Pericles, Mithrapata was the last ruler of Lycia to issue coins. After about 360 BC, the region of Lycia was taken over by the Carian dynast Mausolus.

As with Pericles, the portrait of Mithrapata seen on his coins does not show him wearing the head-dress of an Achaemenid satrap, which suggests a degree of independence from the Achaemenid Empire. His name appears in the Greek alphabet as "Methrapata".

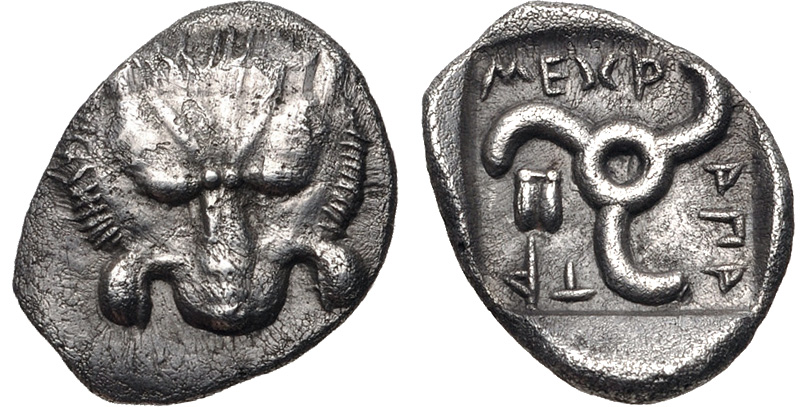
Coin of Mithrapata, c. 390-370 BC

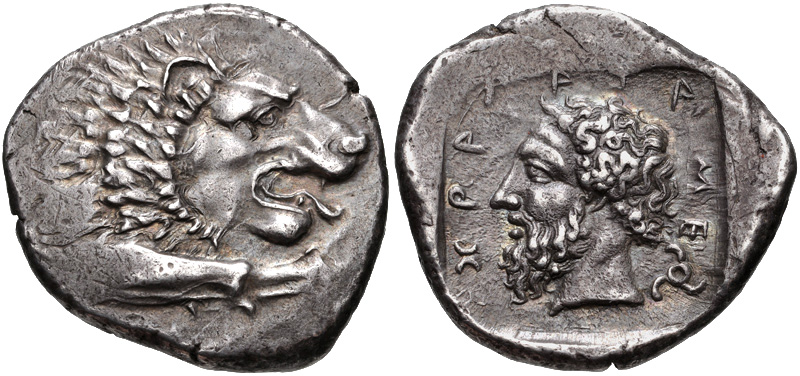
Coin of Mithrapata, c. 390-370 BC
