= Pericles, Dynast of Lycia =

4th-century BC dynast of Lycia

Perikles of Lycia
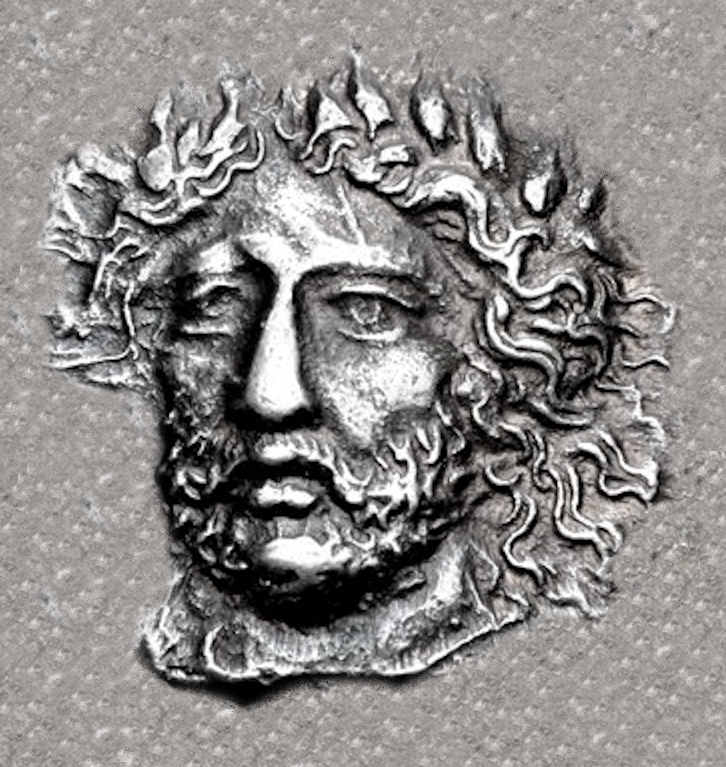
- Portrait of Perikles of Lycia, from his coinage. Circa 375-362 BC
- Military career
- Allegiance: Lycia
- Service years: 375 to 362 BC
- Rank: King of Lycia

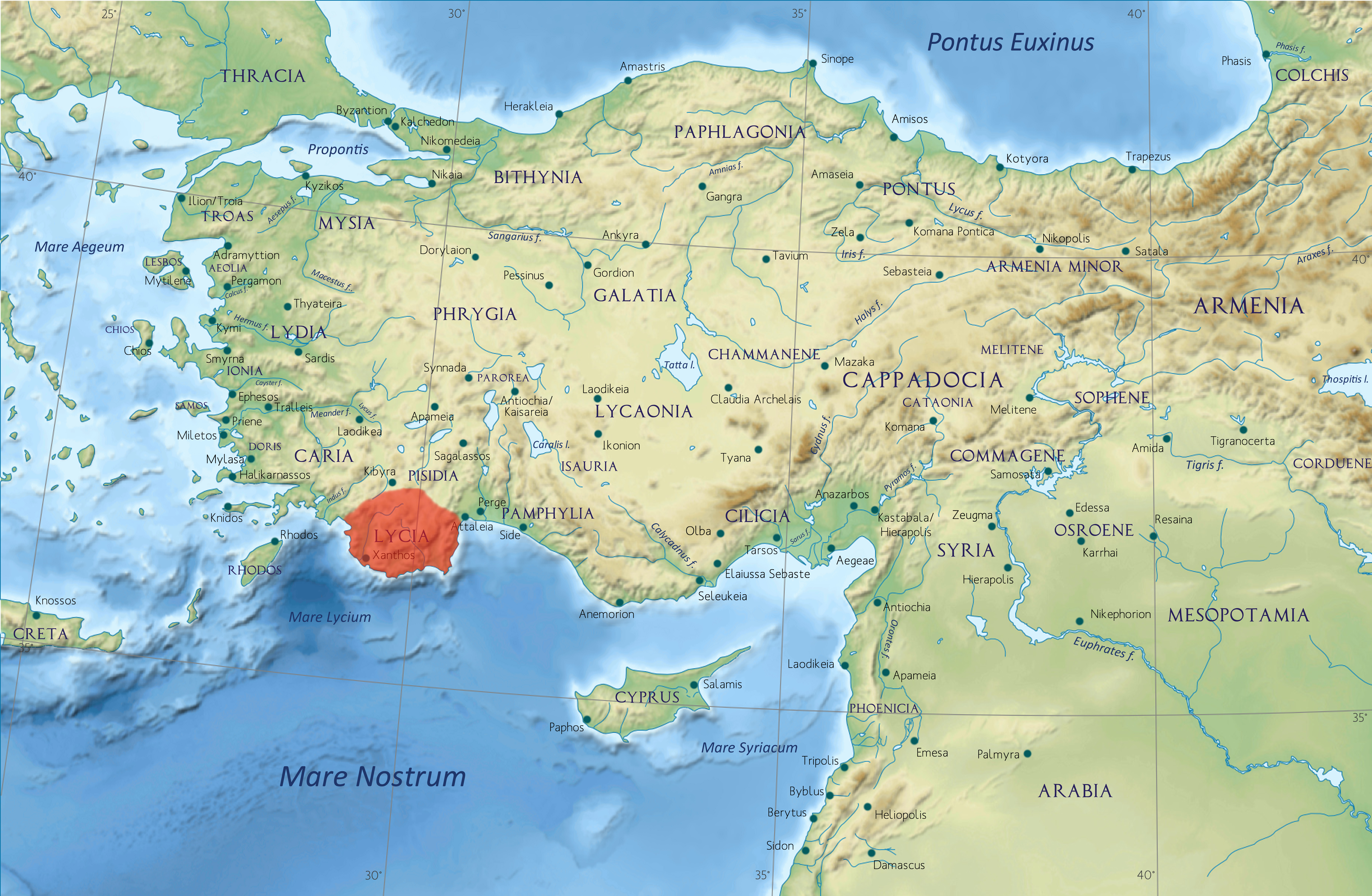
Location of Lycia. Anatolia/Asia Minor in the Greco-Roman period. The classical regions, including Lycia, and their main settlements

Perikles (Perikle in Lycian), was the last known independent dynast of Lycia. A dynast of Limyra in eastern Lycia c. 375–362 BCE, he eventually ruled the entire country during the Revolt of the Satraps, in defiance of the Achaemenid Empire.

== Rule ==
Pericles was originally based in Limyra in eastern Lycia. He initially ruled Limyra alongside Trbbẽnimi, a Lycian dynast known primarily from his coinage. These eastern dynasts flourished in the 370s BCE, when the power of the traditionally-dominant rulers of Xanthos in western Lycia began to wane. Trbbẽnimi minted several coins on the west Lycian weight standard, perhaps anticipating an invasion of the Xanthos valley. Trbbẽnimi may have died c. 375 BCE or slightly earlier, after which Pericles became the sole ruler in Limyra. Trbbẽnimi may have been Pericles' father, although coins of Trbbẽnimi only appear at around the same time as those of Pericles, so a parent-child relationship cannot be proven. Alternatively, they may have been brothers, or one may have married into the other's family.

Pericles' power was concentrated in eastern Lycia, at least in the early part of his reign. As well as Limyra, inscriptions which date themselves to his reign have been found at Teimiussa in eastern Lycia, as well as Arneai and Kızılca in northern Lycia and southern Milyas. His coinage was minted at three sites: Phellos (Lycian: Wehñte), Zagaba, and Wediwiẽ (location unknown).

Pericles' two most serious rivals were Arttum̃para and Mithrapata. These two dynasts, who both had Iranian names, may have been subjects of Artaxerxes II who tried to subdue Pericles and end the Revolt of the Satraps in Lycia. We have the most surviving evidence for the career of Arttum̃para, who may have governed in the area around Xanthos in western Lycia. It may be the case that Mithrapata was his equivalent in eastern Lycia, whom Pericles defeated more quickly.

The most significant evidence which shows that Pericles went to war with these two is an inscription from Limyra, which describes a military frieze as "when Pericles besieges Arttum̃para" (Lycian: ẽke : ese : Perikle : tebete : Arttum̃para).

Arttum̃para was minting coins at Side in Pamphylia by c. 372 – c. 370 BCE, at which point Pericles had driven him out of Lycia. Mithrapata was probably deposed earlier, perhaps by Trbbẽnimi as well as Pericles.

Further evidence for Pericles' expansion into western Lycia is provided by the Greek historian Theopompus. He describes how Pericles, as king (βασίλευς), besieged Telmessos on the western frontier of Lycia.

Pericles styled himself as king of Lycia. The Lycian word for this title was xñtawata (Lycian script: 𐊜𐊑𐊗𐊀𐊇𐊀𐊗𐊀), and appears on many inscriptions in reference to Pericles. An altar from Limyra gives us the Greek equivalent of this title: Περικλῆς Λυκίας β[ασιλεύων], "Pericles who is king of Lycia". He cast himself as a native Lycian fighting for liberation against Persians. One inscription explicitly describes his rival Arttum̃para as a Mede (Lycian: 𐊀𐊕𐊗𐊗𐊒𐊐𐊓𐊀𐊕𐊀:𐊎𐊁𐊅𐊁, Arttum̃para mede).

Pericles took part in the Revolt of the Satraps. This was not a coordinated effort; Pericles had established himself as an independent king of Lycia throughout the 370s BCE, whereas the Great Revolt took place in the late 360s BCE. Nonetheless, Persian rule was firmly reestablished in Lycia in c. 362 BCE, after the Revolt of the Satraps had collapsed and effort was made to subdue rebellious parts of Anatolia. Control was taken by Autophradates, the satrap of Lydia, who shortly transferred the province to Mausolus, the satrap of nearby Caria.

== Tomb ==
A monumental tomb was erected to Perikles in Limyra, decorated with frieze showing Pericles going to war. The tomb was in the form of a Greek Ionic temple. It was one of several monumental tombs built in southwestern Anatolia in the fourth century BCE and belongs to the same tradition as the earlier Nereid Monument and the later Mausoleum at Halicarnassus, blending Anatolian and Greek (Athenian) styles. Several friezes from the tomb are now visible in the Antalya Archeological Museum.

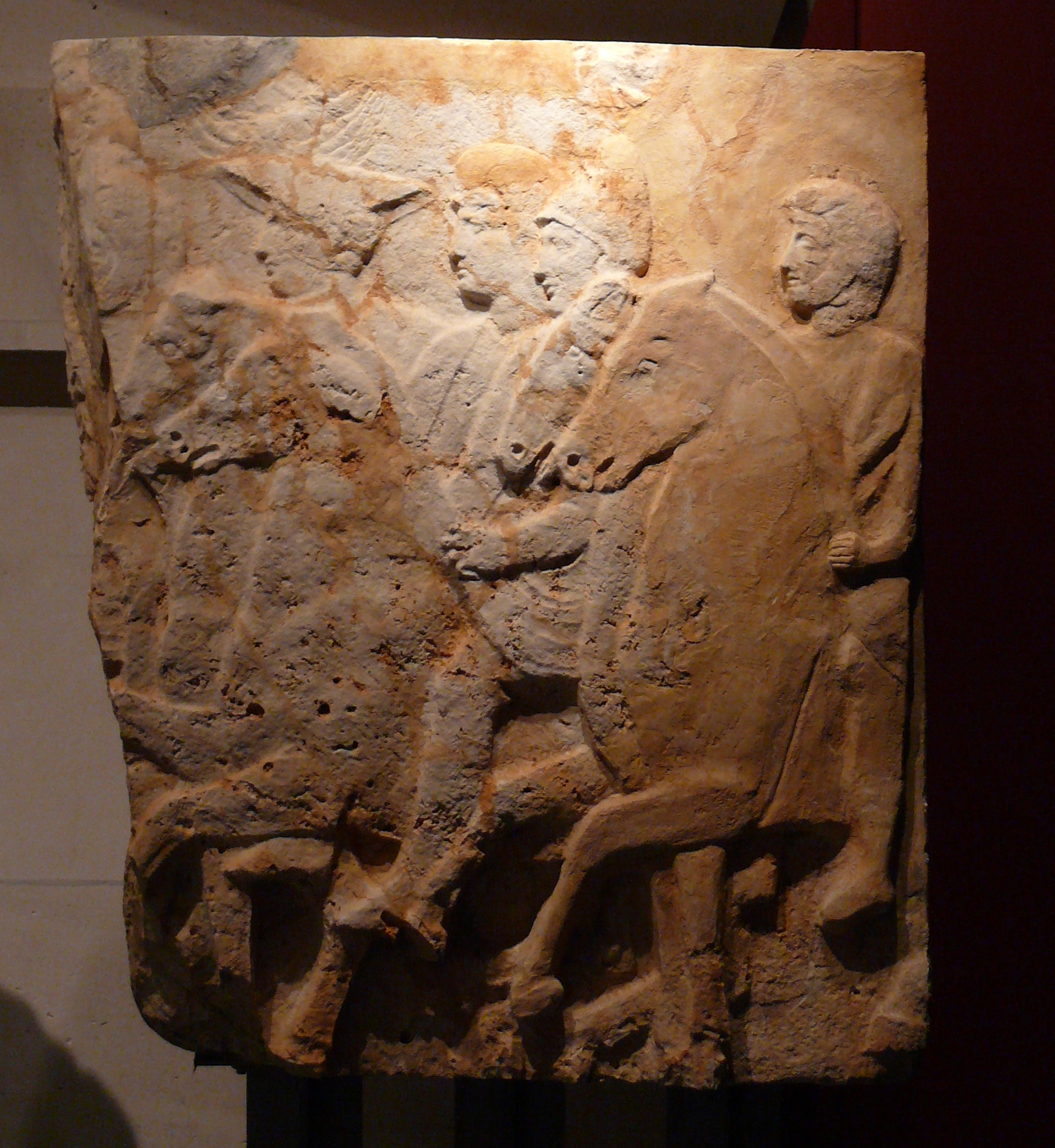
Frieze on the tomb of Pericles, cavalry.

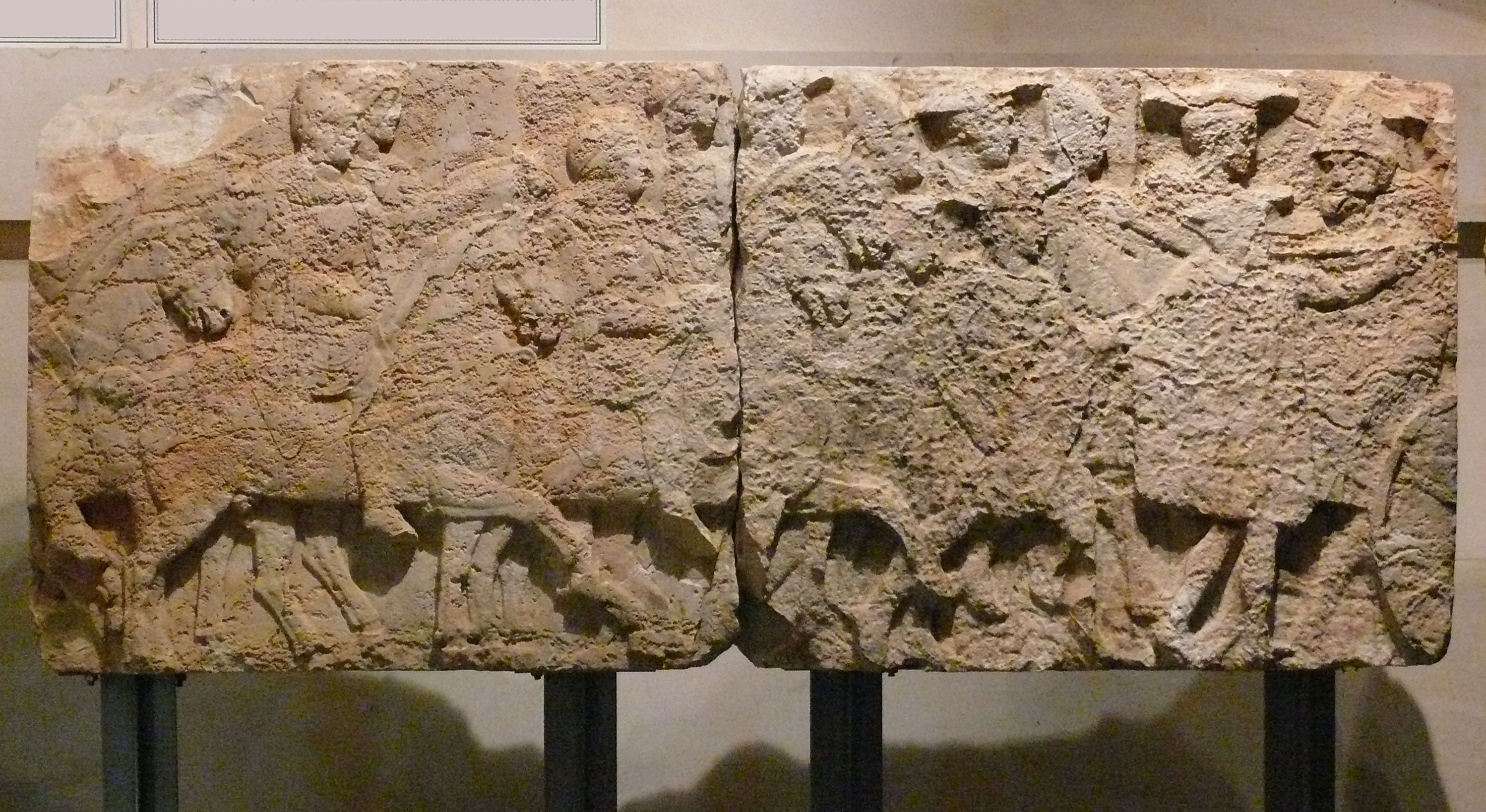
Frieze on the tomb of Pericles.

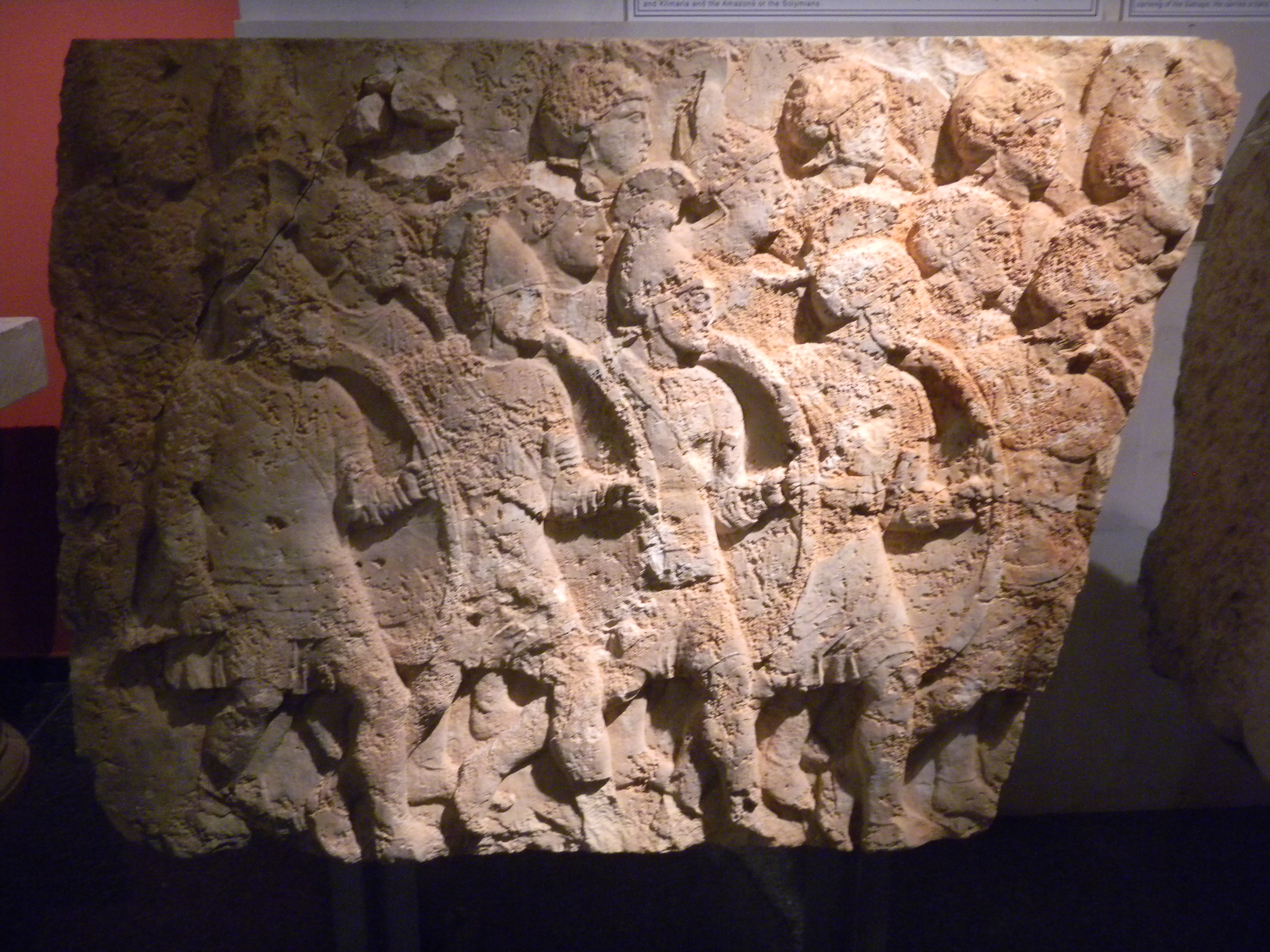
Frieze on the tomb of Pericles, phalanx.

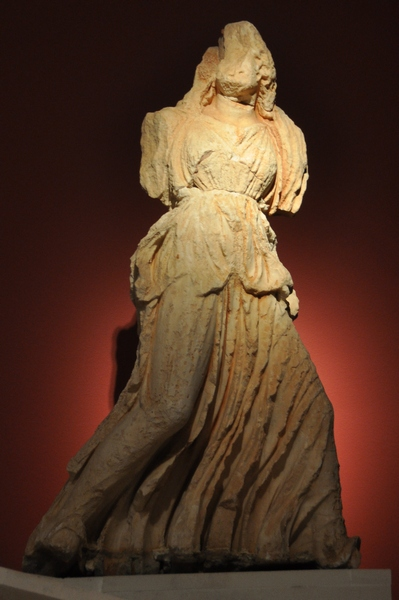
Tomb of Pericles, fleeing Gorgo.

== Coinage ==
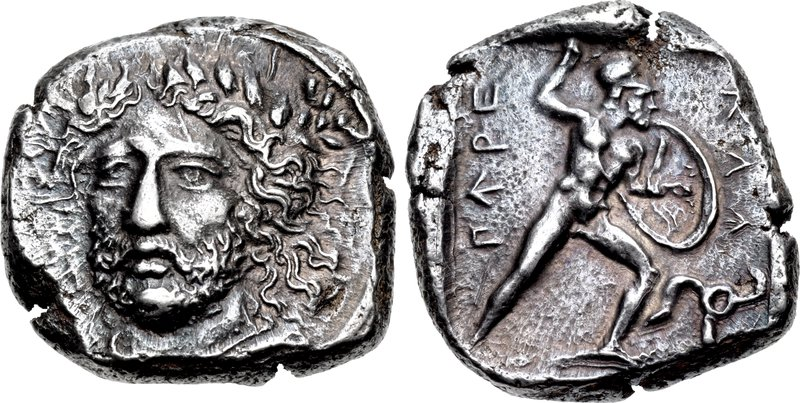
Coin of Perikles.

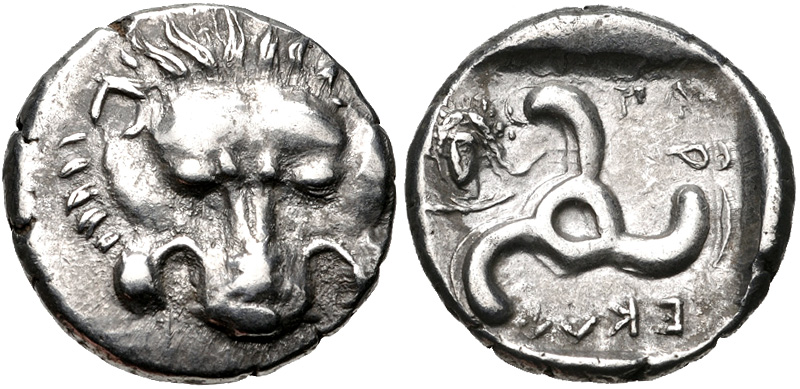
Coin of Perikles (Lion scalp facing and Triskeles)

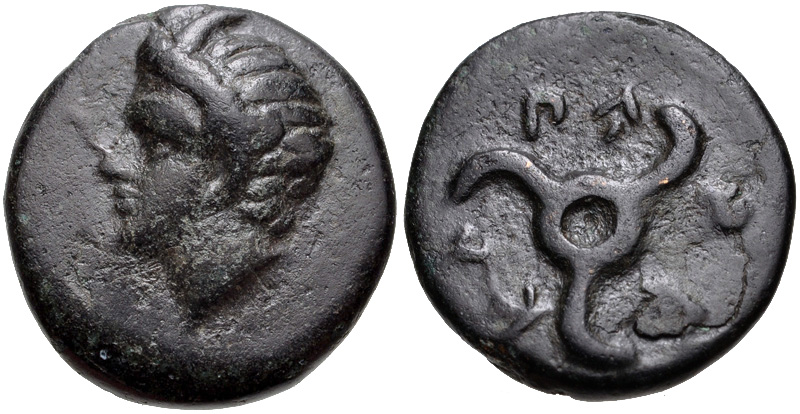
Coin of Perikles (Horned head of Pan, and Triskeles)

== Bibliography ==
- Şare, Tuna (2013). "The sculpture of the Heroon of Perikle at Limyra: the making of a Lycian king". Anatolian Studies. 63: 55–74. doi:10.1017/S0066154613000045. JSTOR 42657426.
