= Limyra =

Ancient Lycian city

- Λίμυρα (Ancient Greek)
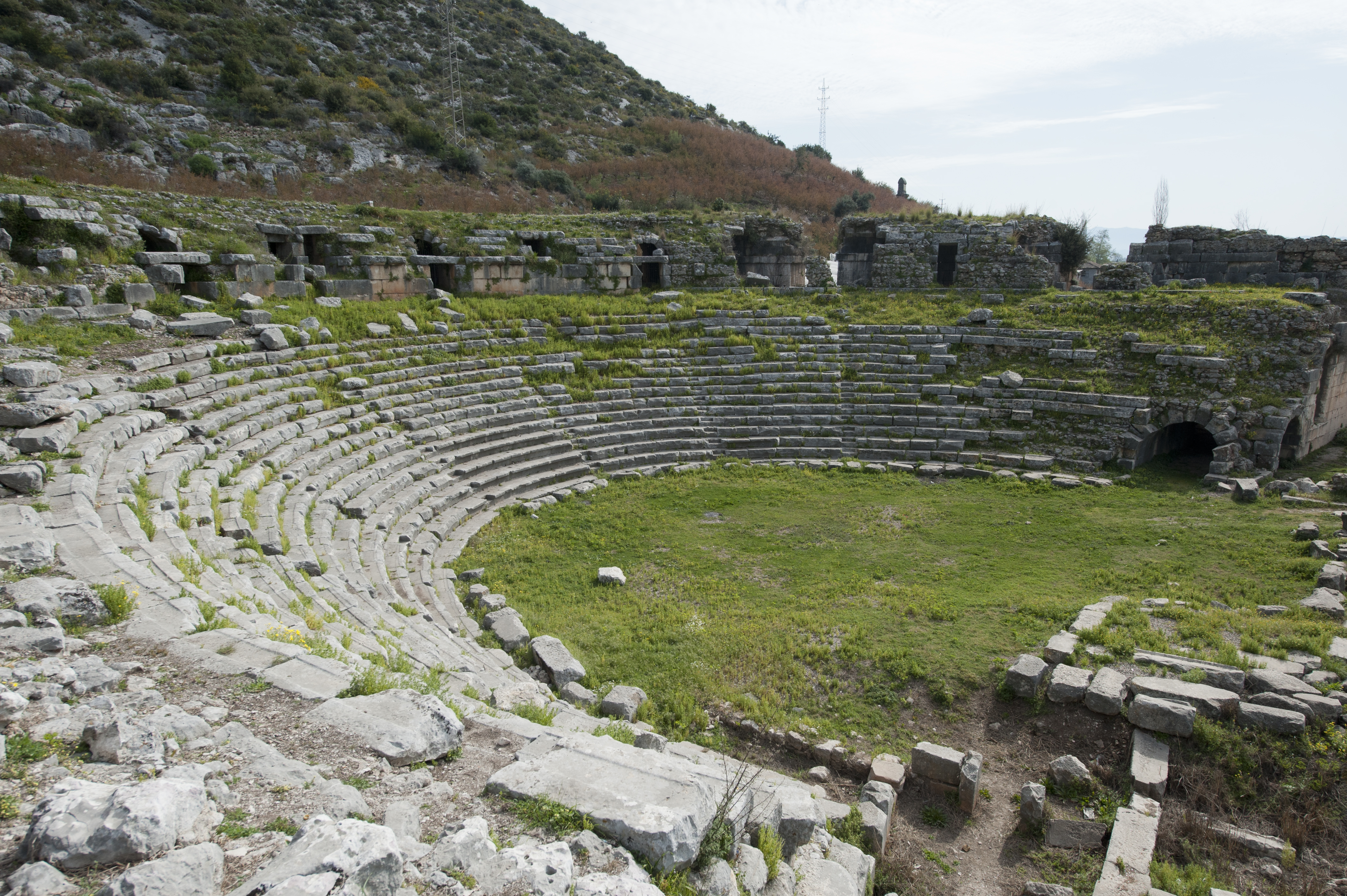
- Limyra Theatre

- Location within Turkey
- 36.343873°N 30.171289°E
- Type: Settlement
- Cultures: Hellenic/Persian
- Location: Antalya Province, Turkey
- Region: Lycia

Site notes
- Condition: In ruins

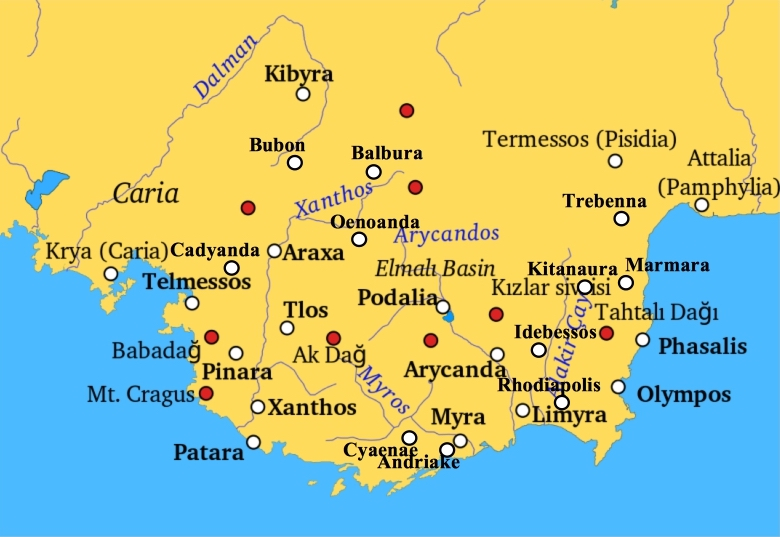
Cities of ancient Lycia

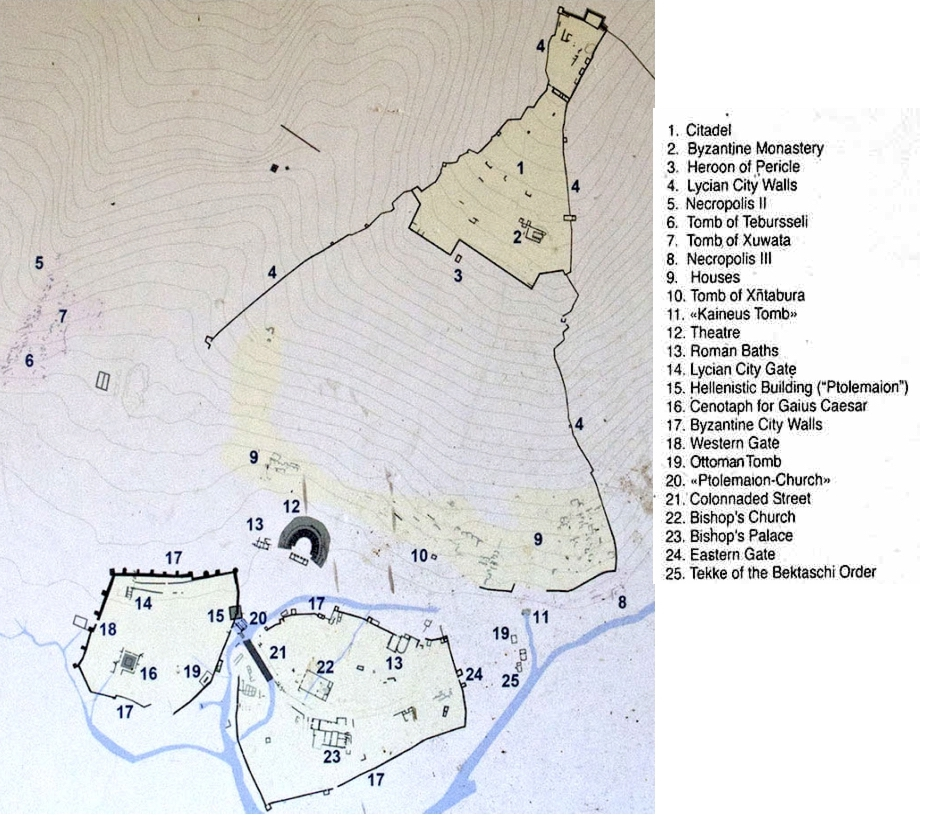
Limyra map

Limyra (Ancient Greek: Λίμυρα Lycian: 𐊈𐊚𐊎𐊒𐊕𐊁) was a small city in ancient Lycia on the southern coast of Asia Minor, on the Limyrus River (Ancient Greek: Λιμύρος).

== History ==
Already flourishing in the second millennium BCE, the city was one of the oldest and most prosperous in Lycia; it gradually became one of the most flourishing trade centres in the Greek world.

In the 4th century BCE Pericles, Dynast of Lycia supported a rebellion of satraps in Asia Minor against the ruling Persians and adopted Limyra as the capital of the Lycian League; subsequently it came under control of the Persian Empire.

The Persians eventually regained rule through Mausolus, the Carian satrap at Halicarnassus.

After Alexander the Great ended Persian rule, most of Lycia was ruled by Ptolemy I Soter; his son Ptolemy II Philadelphos supported the Limyrans against the invading Galatians and the inhabitants dedicated a monument, the Ptolemaion, to him in thanks.

Limyra is mentioned by Strabo (XIV, 666), Ptolemy (V, 3, 6) and several Latin authors.

Augustus had adopted his grandson Gaius Caesar in 17 BCE (aged 3) as his heir. In 1 BC (aged 19) Gaius Caesar was sent to Syria and in 2 AD he went to Armenia, which the Parthians had recently invaded. Gaius successfully placed a pro-Roman king on the Armenian throne but was seriously wounded after being tricked. In 4 AD, during his return to Rome, Gaius died from his wounds at Limyra.

== The Site ==
The lower city is at the base of the acropolis hill and includes two separate walled areas.

The five necropolises dating from the 4th c. BCE and before demonstrate the city's importance. The mausoleum of Pericles is particularly notable for its fine reliefs and exquisite sculptures such as Perseus slaying Medusa and one of her sisters.

A gate in the western city leads down through a marshy area towards the cenotaph of Gaius Caesar, grandson and heir apparent of Augustus, a massive structure standing on a stone podium and dating from around 4 CE.

The Romans cut a theatre into the hill which held 8000 spectators. It was commissioned in the second century CE by an important Lycian benefactor named Opramoas of Rhodiapolis. Also from this period are a bathhouse with a complex heating system and the colonnaded streets.

The Roman Bridge at Limyra, east of the city, is one of the oldest segmental arch bridges in the world.

== Ecclesiastical history ==
Limyra is mentioned as a bishopric in Notitiæ Episcopatuum down to the 12th and 13th centuries as a suffragan of the metropolitan of Myra.

Six bishops are known: Diotimus, mentioned by St. Basil (ep. CCXVIII); Lupicinus, present at the First Council of Constantinople, 381; Stephen, at the Council of Chalcedon (451); Theodore, at the Second Council of Constantinople in 553; Leo, at the Second Council of Nicaea in 787; Nicephorus, at the Council of Constantinople (879-880).

In the Annuario Pontificio it is listed as a titular see of the Roman province of Lycia.

== Gallery ==
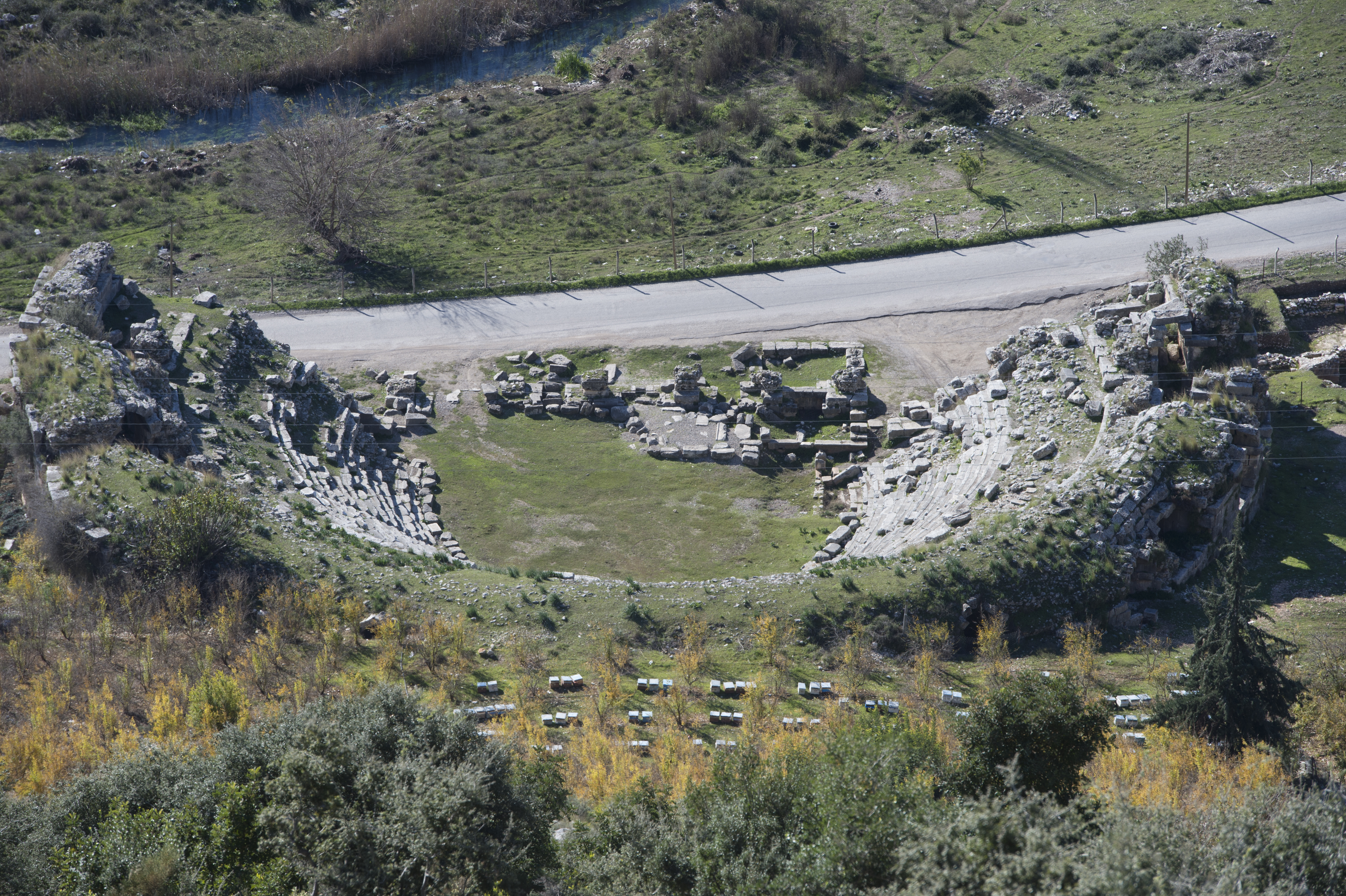
Limyra Theatre from uphill

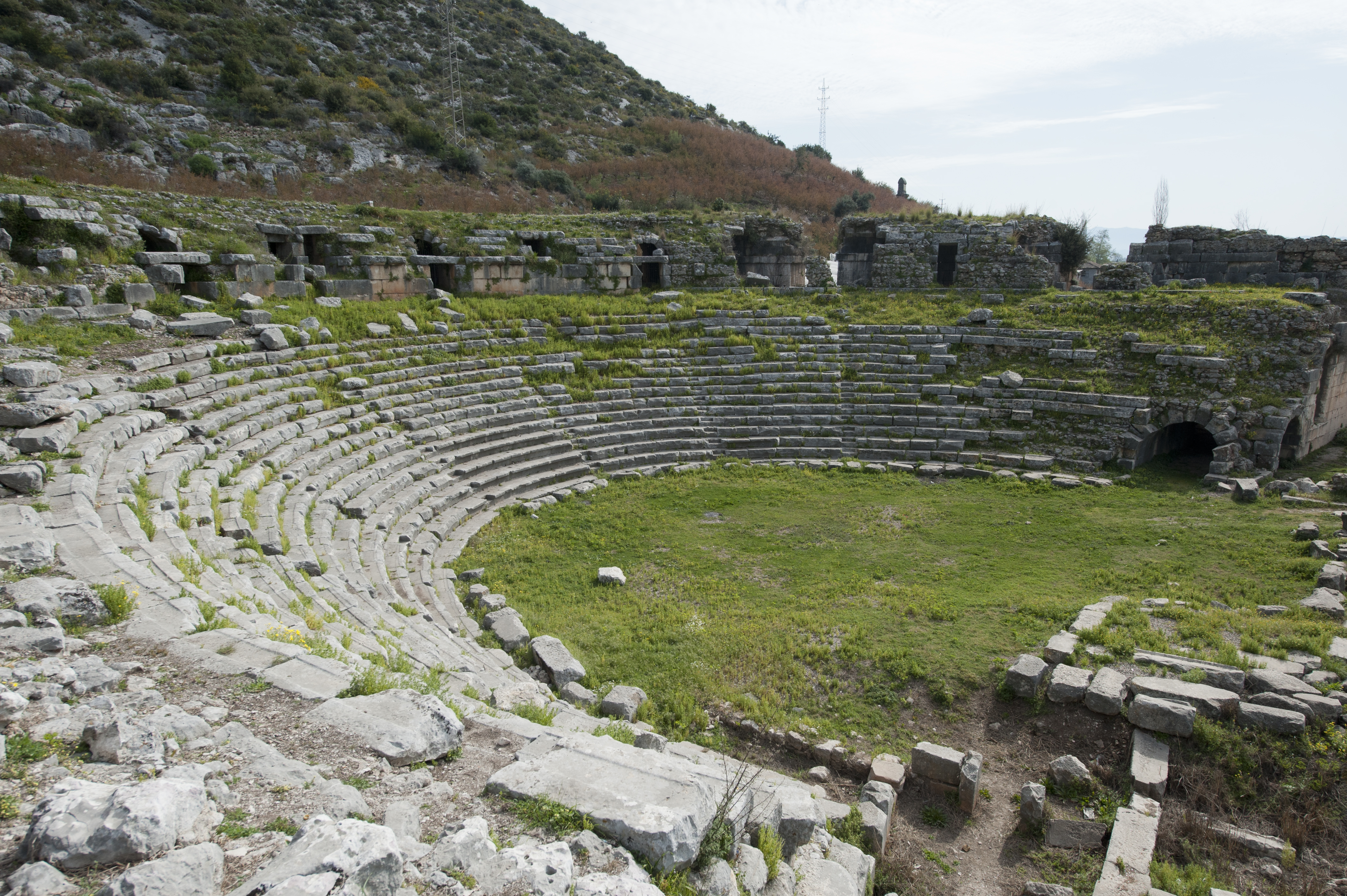
Limyra Theatre

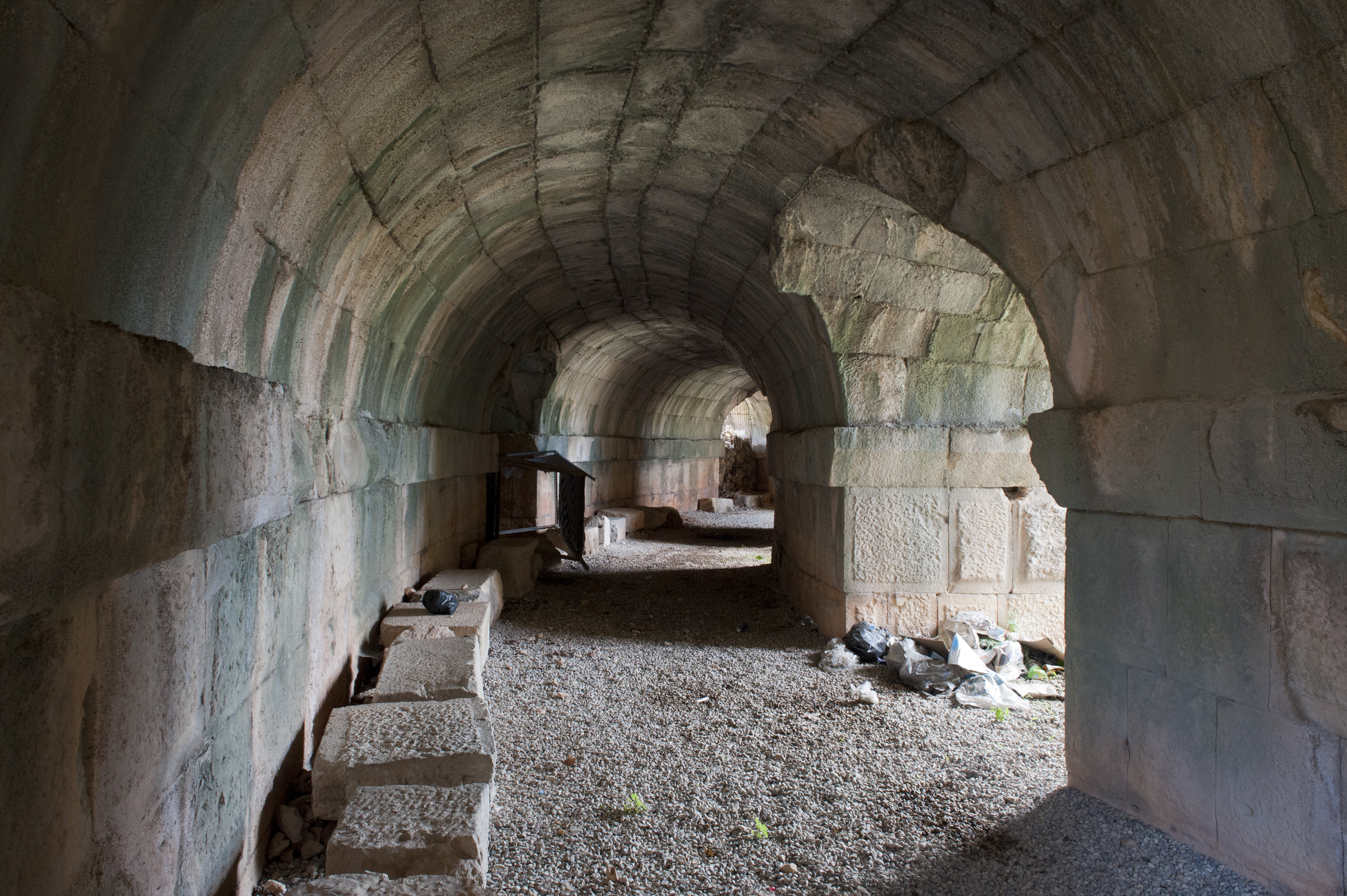
Limyra Theatre corridors

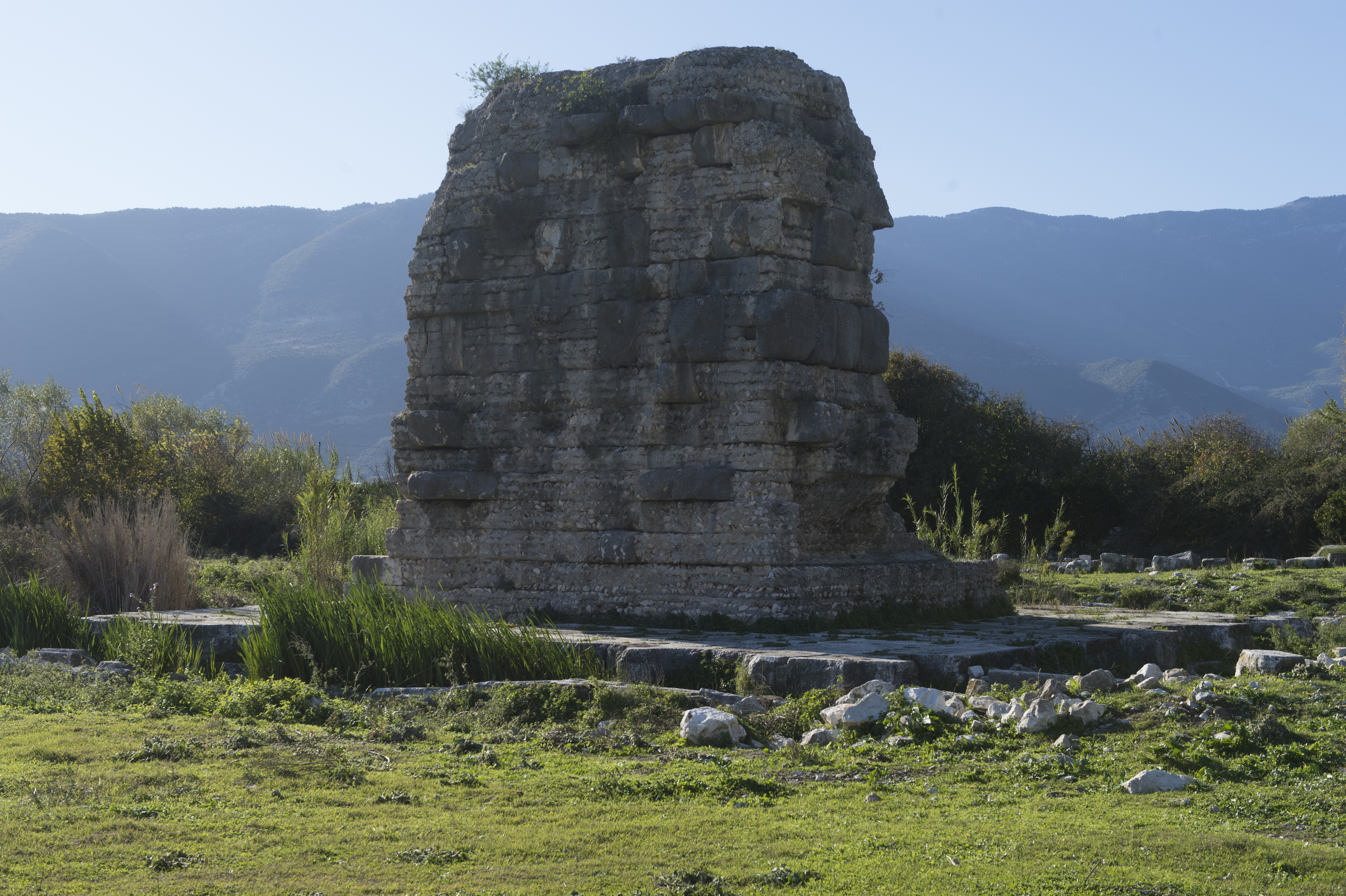
Limyra Cenotaph of Gaius Caesar

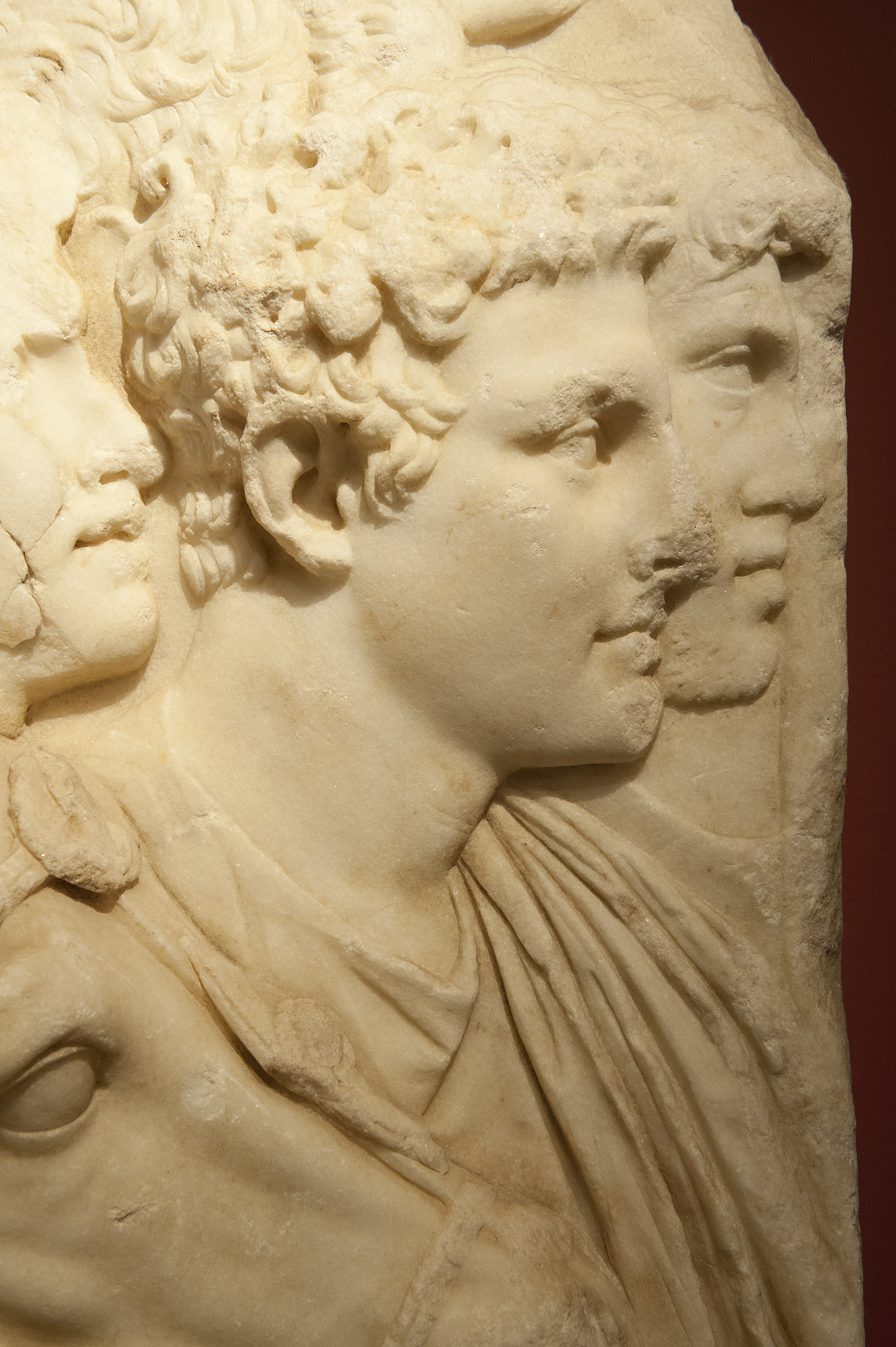
Limyra Cenotaph Gaius Caesar in Antalya Museum

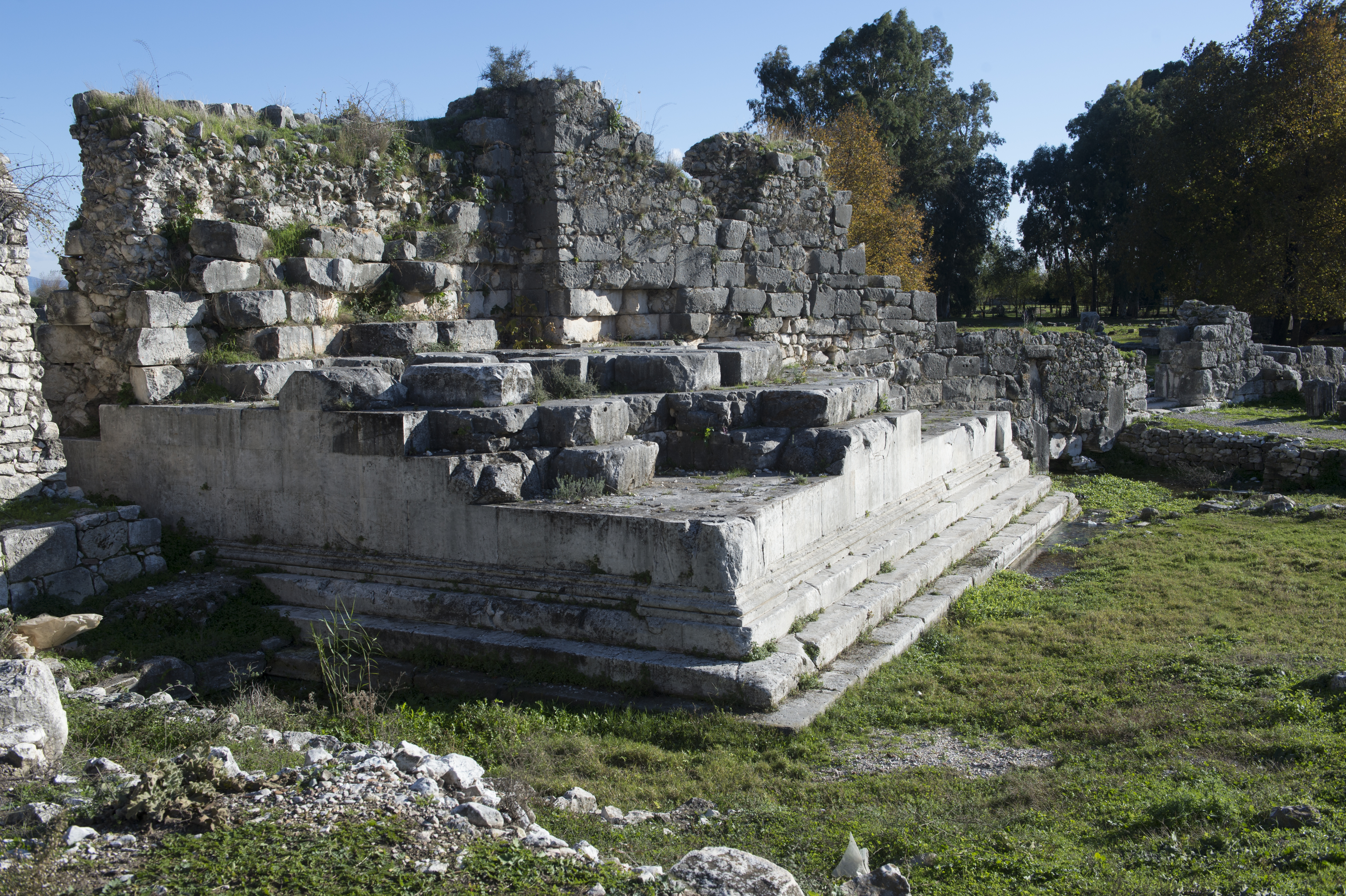
Limyra Ptolemaion

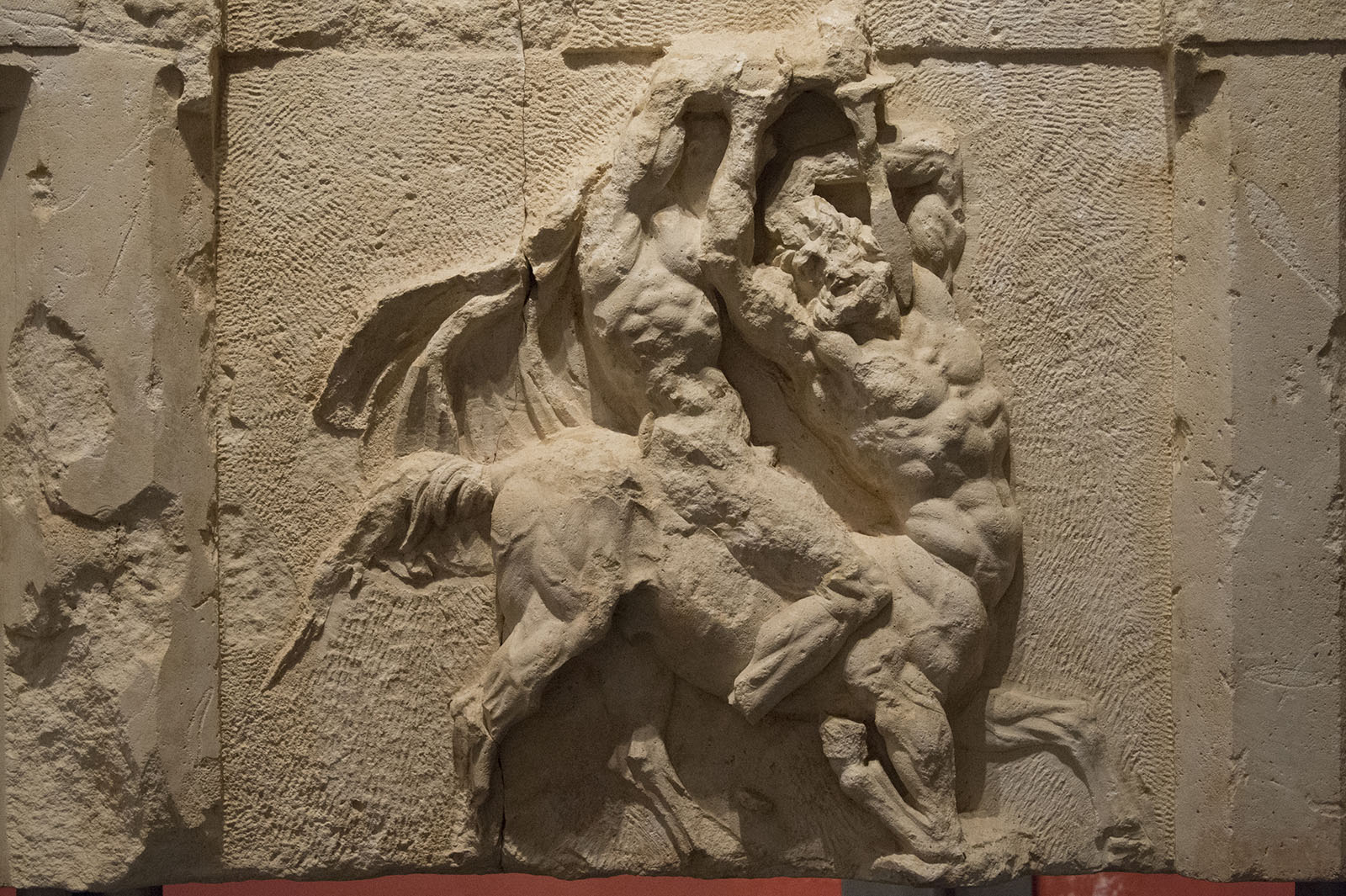
Limyra Ptolemaion relief in Antalya Museum

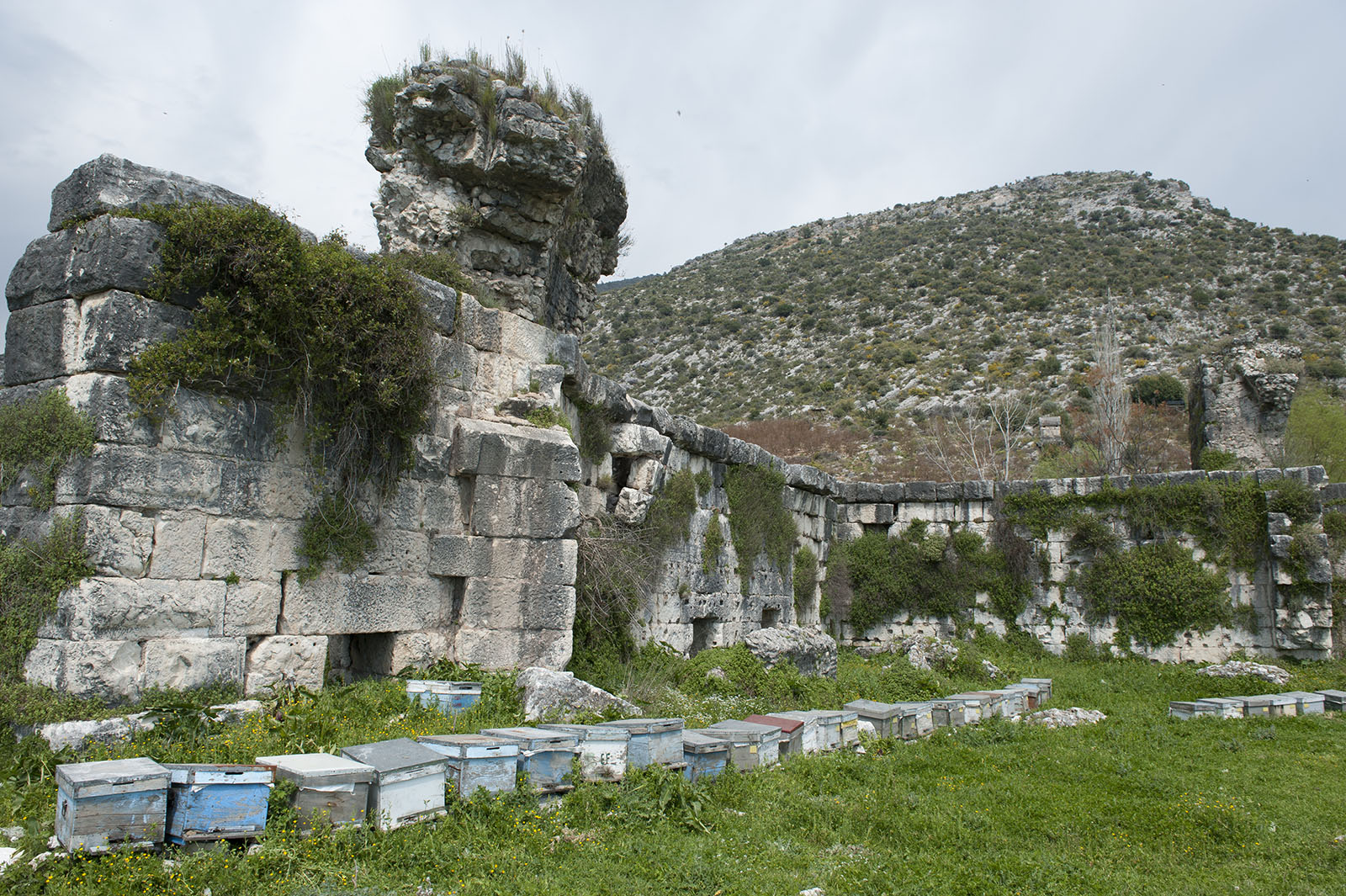
Limyra Bee keeping

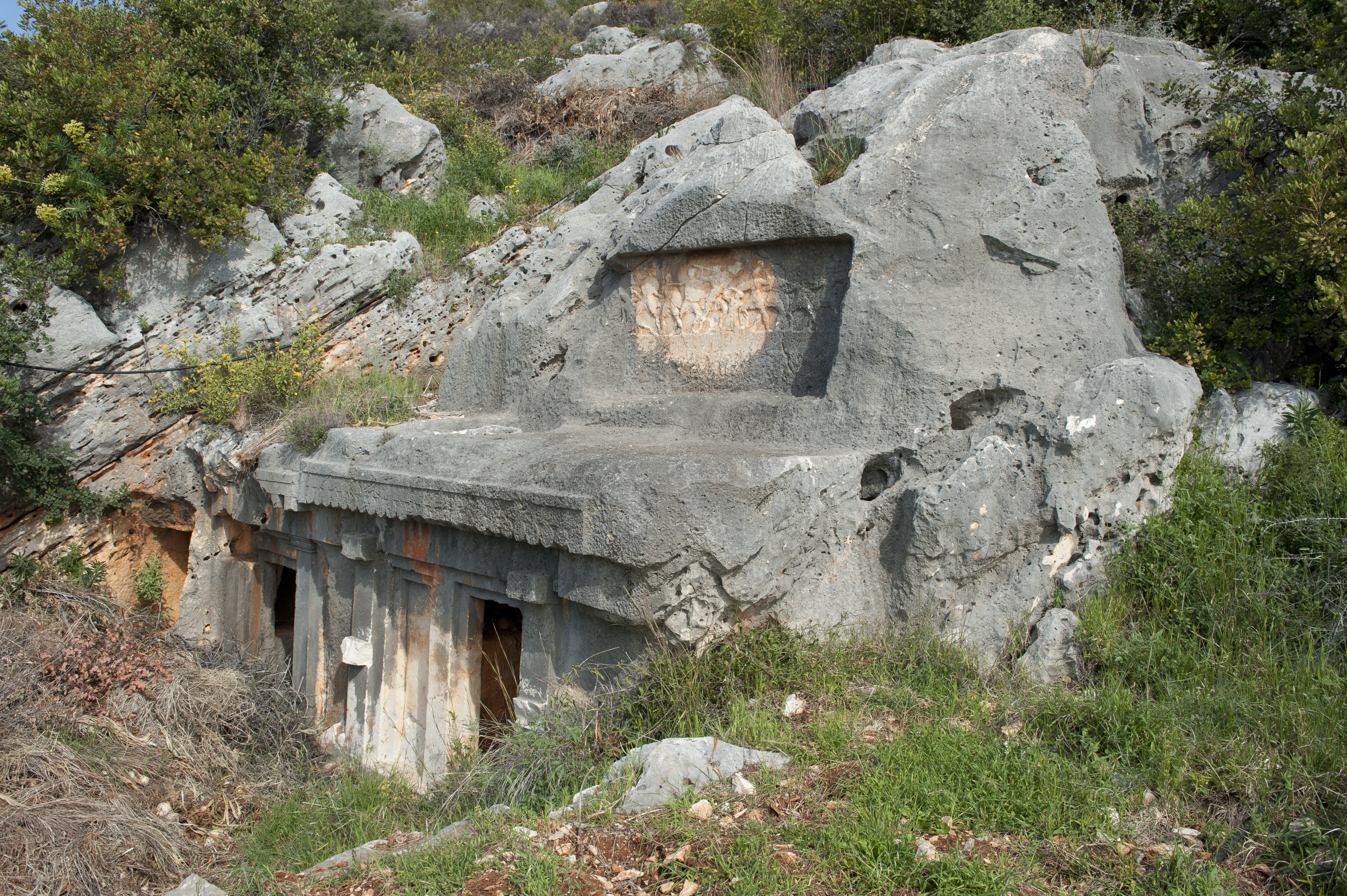
Limyra tomb of Tebursseli

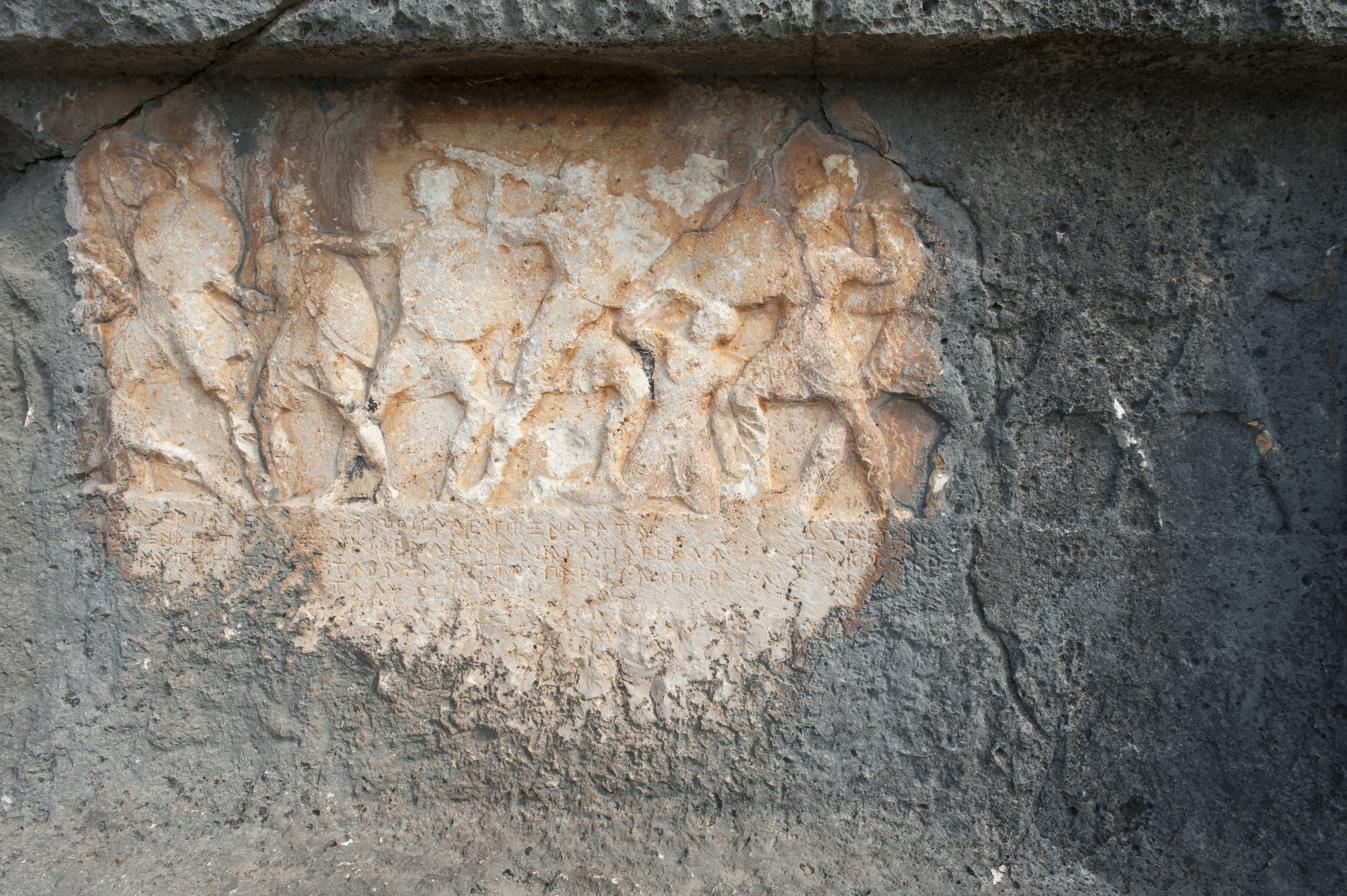
Limyra tomb of Tebursseli decoration

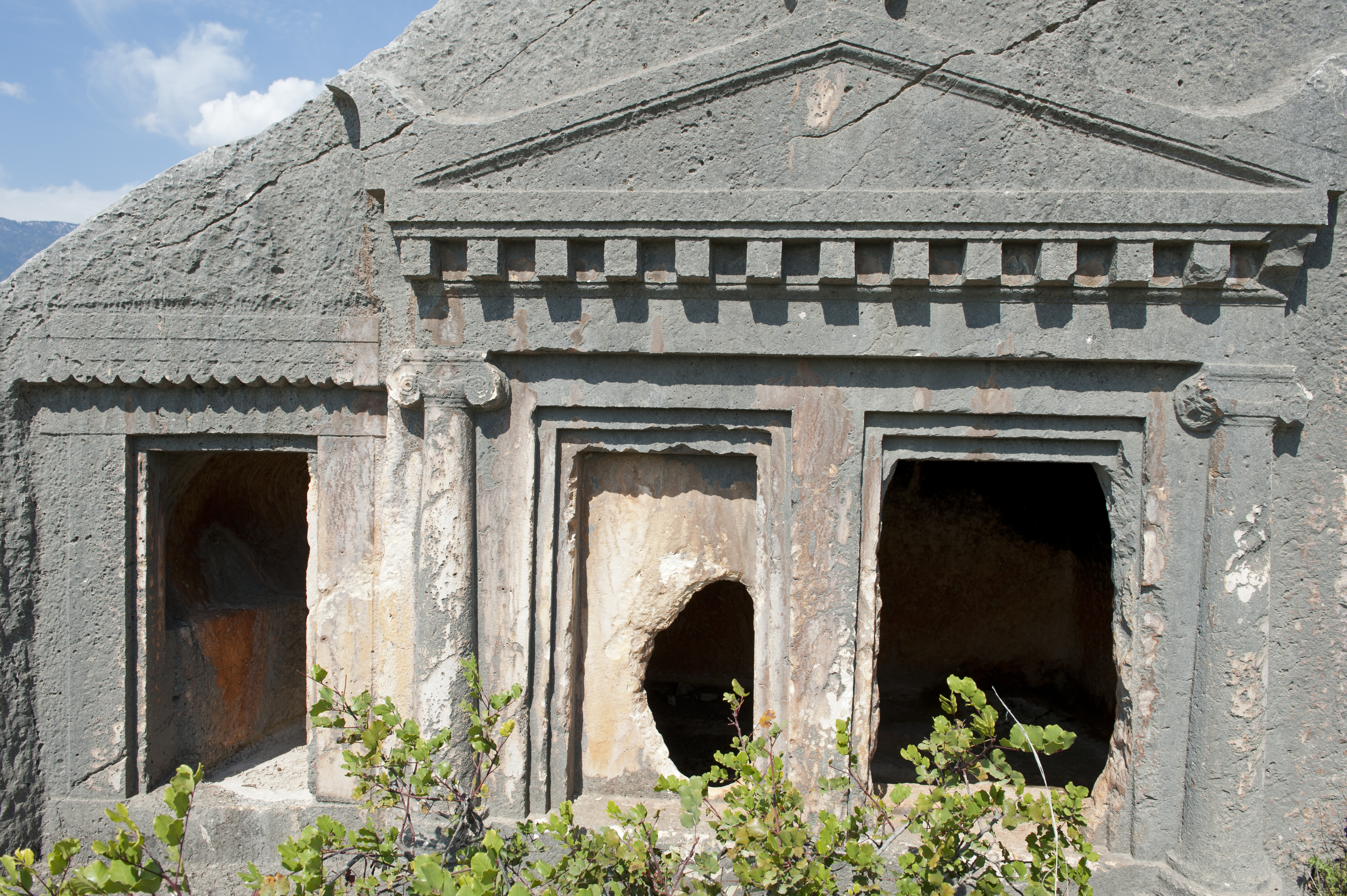
Limyra Temple-type tomb

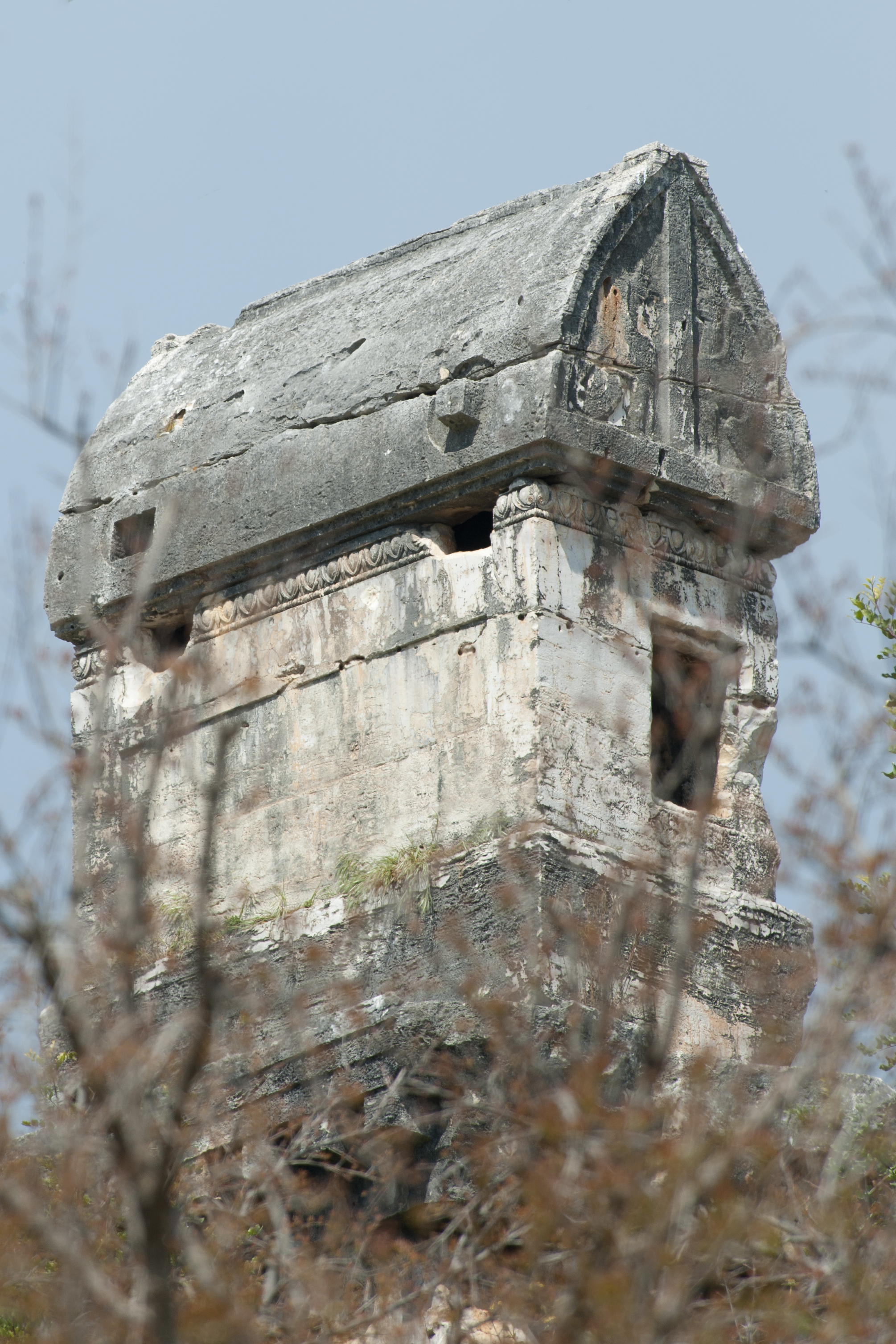
Limyra Sarcophagus of Xñtabura

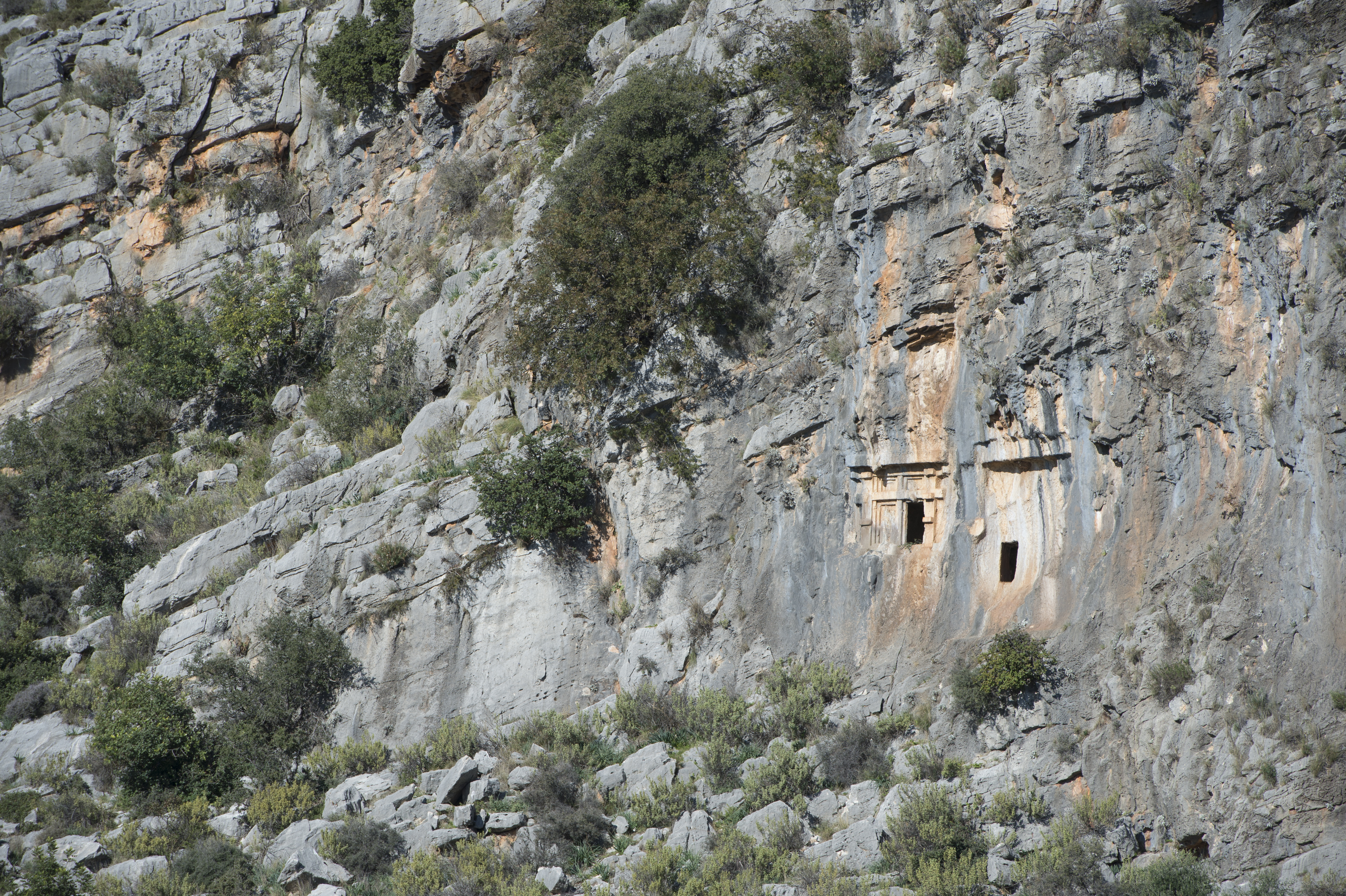
Limyra Rock graves

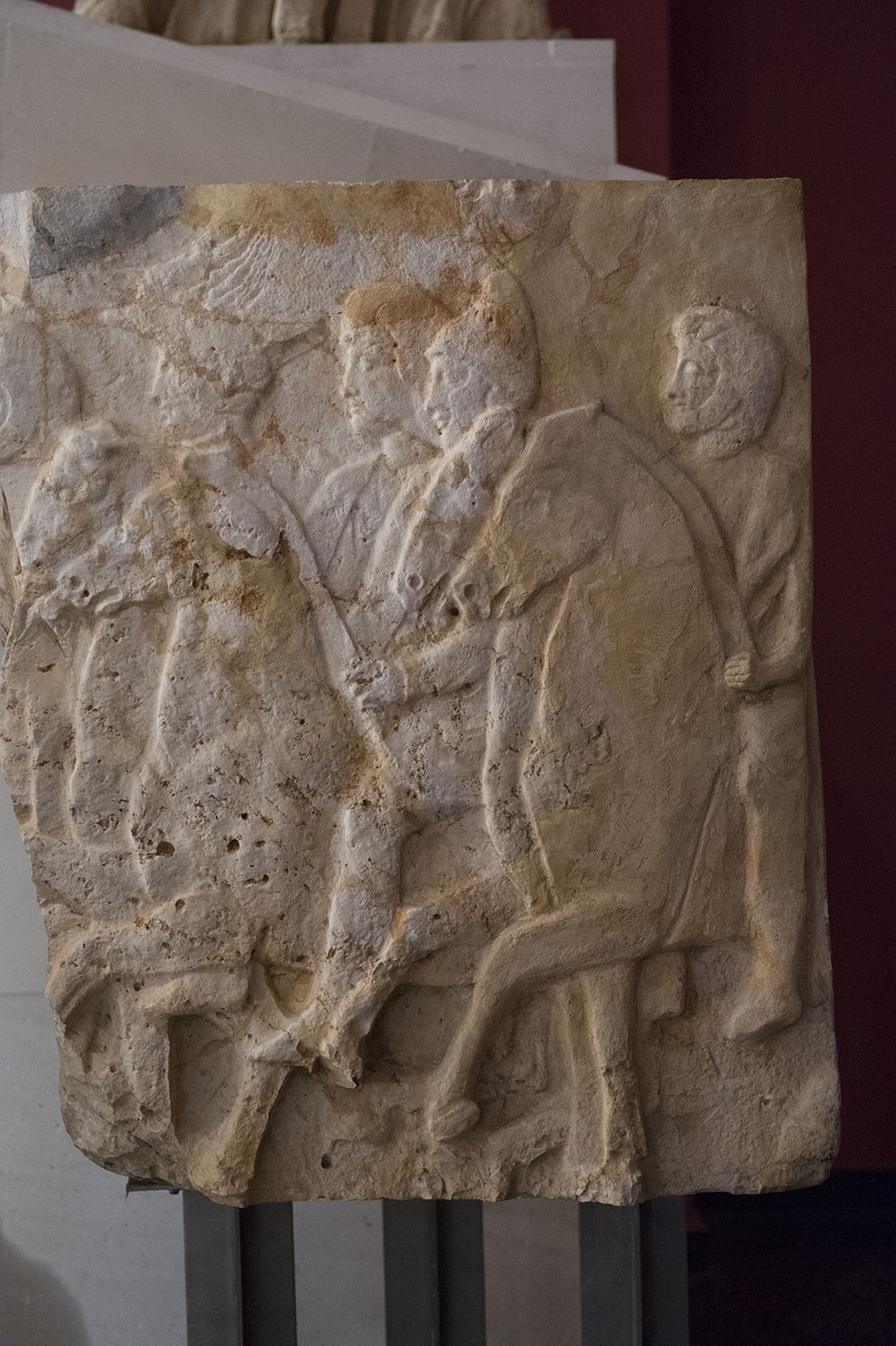
Limyra Heroon Pericles in Antalya Museum

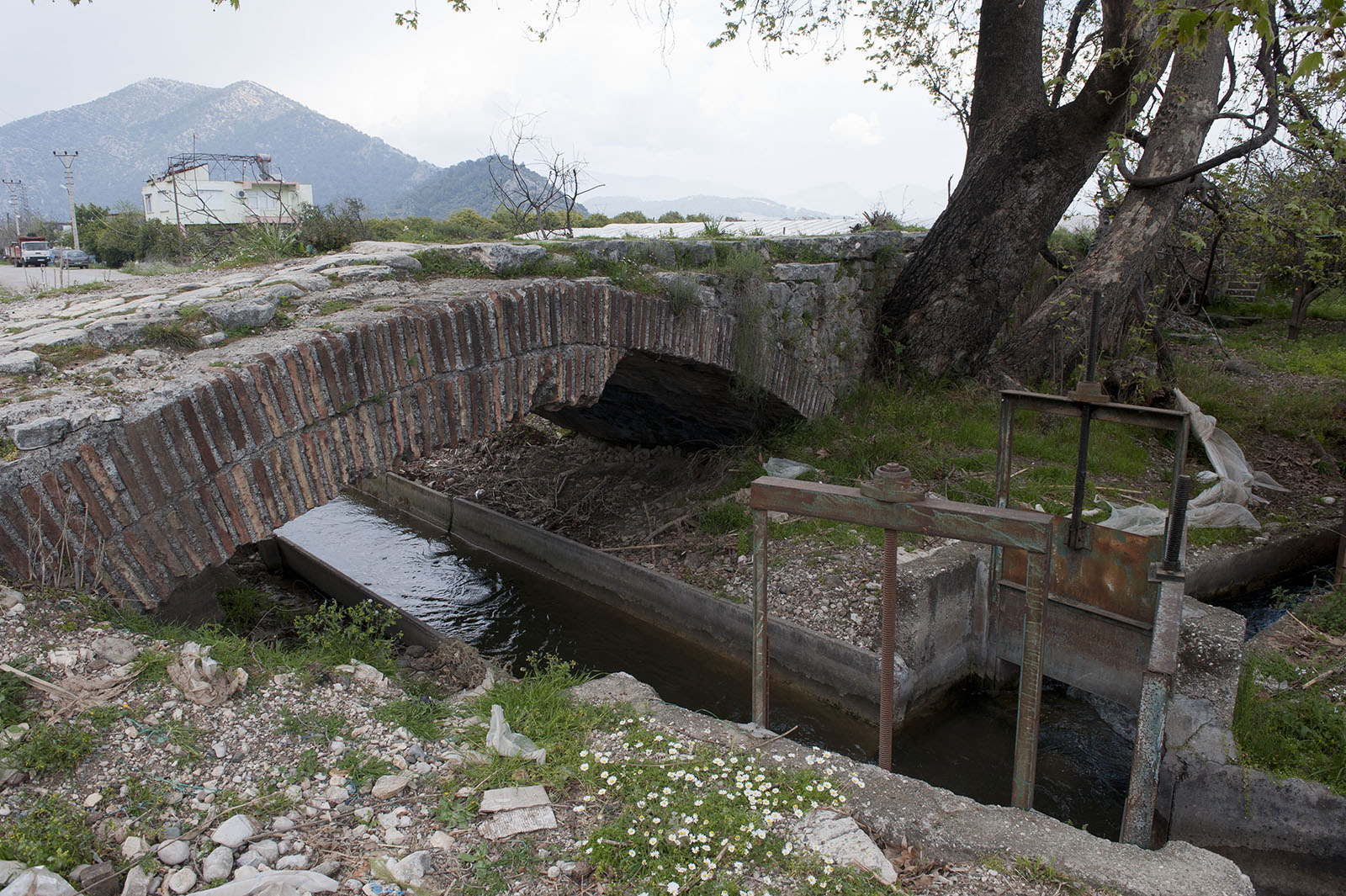
Limyra Roman Bridge
