= Artembares =

Ancient Persian woman in an anecdote about Cyrus the Great

Artembares (Ancient Greek: Ἀρτεμβάρης) was a Median man of noble rank who lived around the 6th century BCE. His son, according to a story about the youth of Cyrus the Great, was one of the playmates of Cyrus, who at the time was presenting himself as if he were the lowly son of a cowherd.

After a disagreement, Cyrus had some other boys seize the son while he whipped him. Artembares, indignant at the treatment of his child by a child of low birth, complained to king Astyages. This is how it was discovered that Cyrus was the son of Mandane and the grandson of Astyages.

This scene is the subject of a notable painting by the 18th century French painter Hyacinthe Collin de Vermont, Cyrus, as an adolescent, having the son of Artembares whipped, which is currently in the collection of the Musée Magnin.
