= Artumpara =

4th-century BC dynast of Lycia

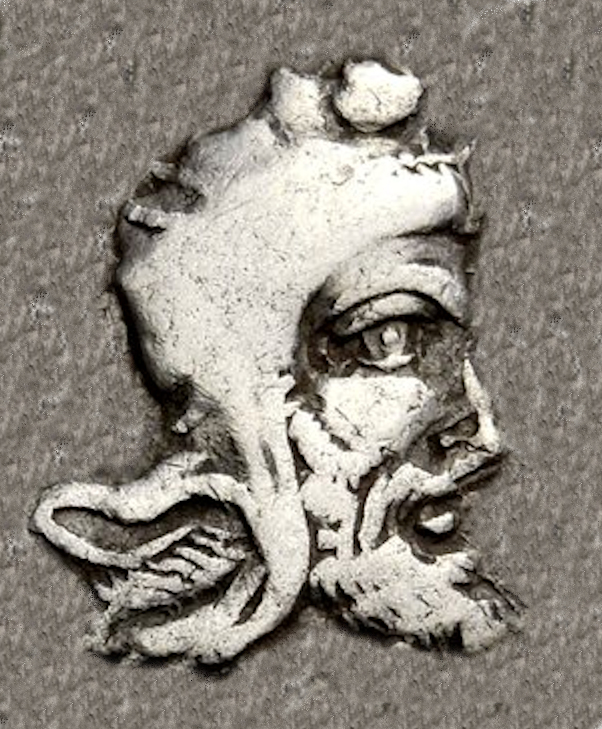
- Portrait of Artumpara wearing the Achaemenid satrapal headdress, from his coinage.
- Military career
- Allegiance: Achaemenid Empire
- Service years: fl. 400 – 370 BC
- Rank: Dynast of Lycia

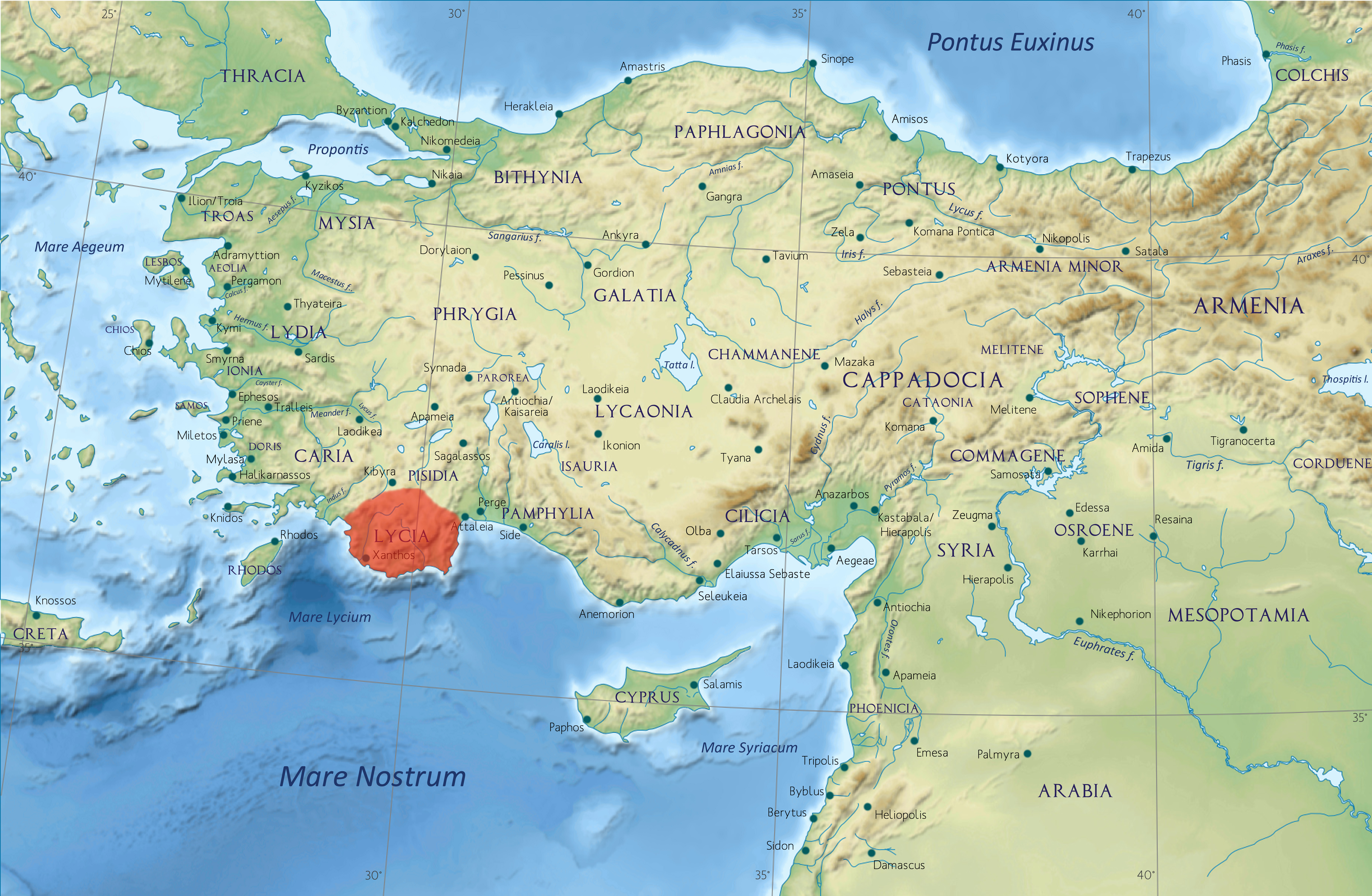
Location of Lycia. Anatolia/Asia Minor in the Greco-Roman period. The classical regions, including Lycia, and their main settlements

Artumpara, also Arttum̃para, Artembares (Persian name, *Rtambura, self-identified as "the Mede) was an Achaemenid Satrap of Lycia circa 400-370 BCE. He was involved in the Great Satraps' Revolt on the side of central Achaemenid authority in 366-360 BCE, helping to put down the rebel Datames. He is well known for his coinage.

Artumpara is known to have competed for power with another man named Mithrapata. It is thought he was defeated by Perikle.

== Coinage ==
The portrait of Artumpara appears on his coinage, wearing the Achaemenid satrapal headdress.

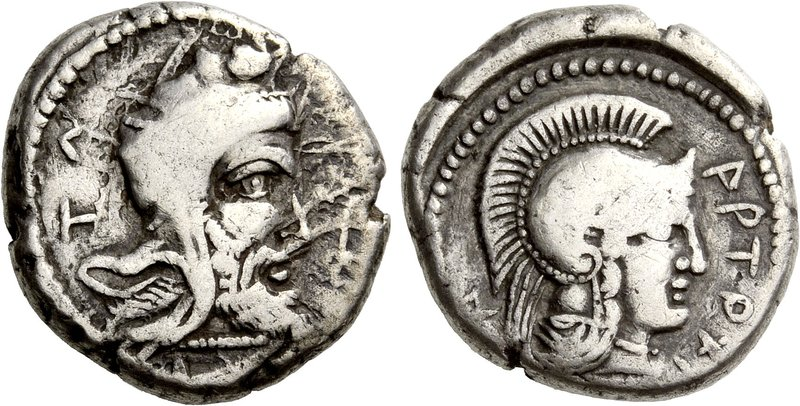
Coin of Artumpara, Satrap of Lycia, circa 400-370 BCE.
