= Hyacinthe Collin de Vermont =

French painter

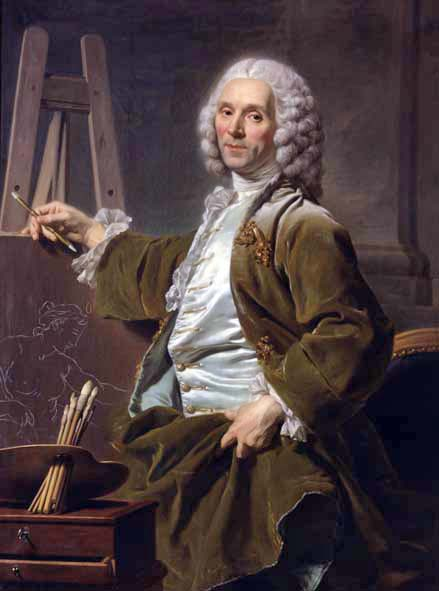
Hyacinthe Collin de Vermont painted by Alexander Roslin

Cyrus, as an adolescent, having the son of Artembares whipped, by Hyacinthe Collin de Vermont, Musée Magnin de Dijon

Hyacinthe Collin de Vermont (19 January 1693, Versailles – 16 February 1761, Paris) was a French painter.

Collin de Vermont was a pupil of Jouvenet and of Rigaud.

== Works ==
- Bacchus changes the Maenads' works into vine foliage, Musée de Versailles
- Cyrus, as an adolescent, having the son of Artembares whipped, Musée Magnin de Dijon
- Jupiter and Mercury at the house of Philemon and Baucis, Musée de Versailles
- Autumn (beehive), Musée des Beaux-Arts de Rouen
- Summer (haystack and plough), Musée de Rouen
- The Shepherd Apulas transformed into an olive tree, Musée de Versailles
- Belshazzar's Feast, Musée Magnin de Dijon
- The Mystical Marriage of Saint Catherine, Musée des beaux-arts de Lyon
- The Rejuvenication of Iolaus by Hebe, Musée de Versailles
- The Marriage Feast of Alexander and Roxana, Paris; Musée du Louvre
- Roger arriving in Alcine Island, 1740, Museum of Grenoble
