= Manav =

Name list

Manav is a given name. Notable people with the name include:

- Manav Gohil (born 1974), Indian actor
- Manav Gupta (born 1967), Indian artist
- Manav Dayal I.C.Sharma, Indian philosopher, saint, and yogi
- Manav Kaul (born 1976), Indian theatre director, playwright, actor and film-maker
- Manav Vij, Indian actor

== See also ==
- Manav Hatya, 1986 Hindi film
- Manavs, a Turkic ethnic group from Turkey
- Manav Kendra (literally "Man-making Center") or Lighthouse Center
- Manava, Indian mathematician (c. 750 – 690 BC)
- Manava (Pamphylia), town of ancient Pamphylia
  - Manavlı, a Yörük tribe living around the Taurus Mountains in Turkey, which takes its name from the extinct settlement
- Manavand (disambiguation)
- Manavi
- Manavur
