= Hocalı =

Hacalı is a Turkish place name and it may refer to:

- Hocalı, Manavgat - a village in Manavgat district of Antalya Province
- Hocalı, Mut - a village in Mut district of Mersin Province

== See also ==
- Khojali
