= Pisidian language =

Extinct Anatolian language

Pisidian
- Region: Pisidia, ancient southwestern Anatolia
- Era: attested 1st-2nd century
- Language family: Indo-European: Anatolian; Luwo-Lydian; Luwo-Palaic; Luwic; (unclassified); Pisidian
- Early forms: Proto-Indo-European: Proto-Anatolian
- Writing system: Pisidian script

Language codes
- ISO 639-3: xps
- Glottolog: pisi1234
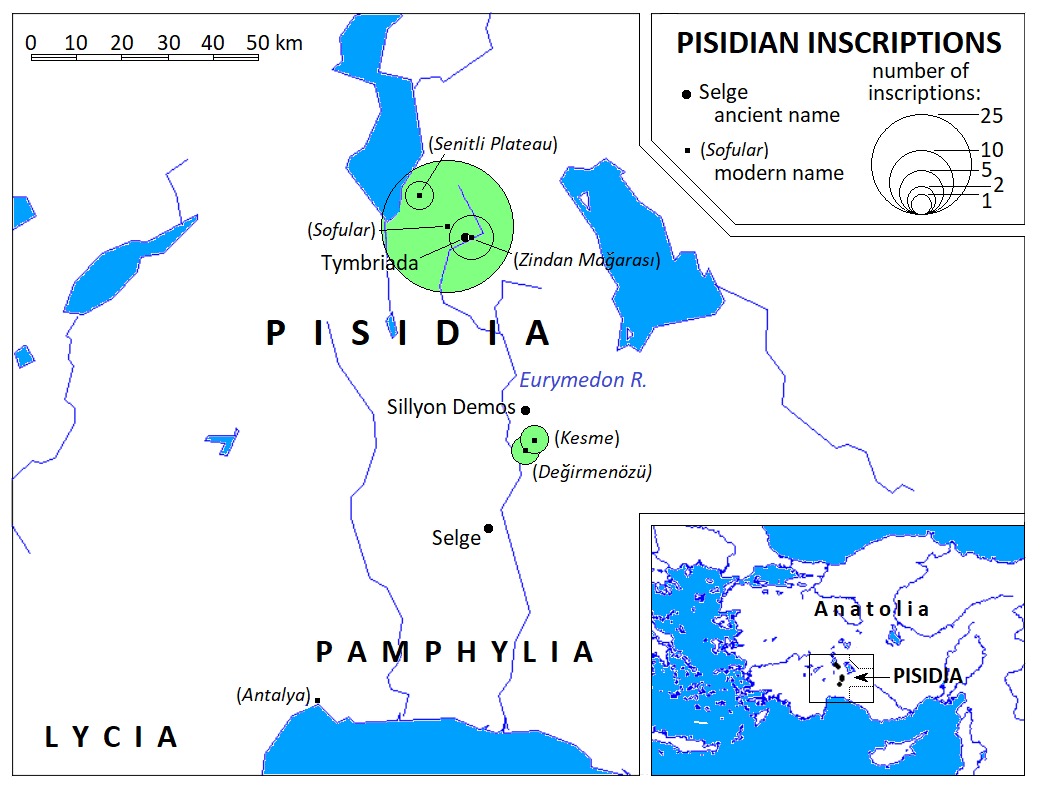
- Map showing where inscriptions in the Pisidian language have been found

Pisidian is a member of the extinct Anatolian branch of the Indo-European language family spoken in Pisidia, a region of ancient Asia Minor. Known from some fifty short inscriptions from the first to second centuries AD, it appears to be closely related to Lycian, Milyan, and Sidetic.

== Sources ==
Pisidian is known from about fifty funeral inscriptions, most of them from Sofular (classical Tymbrias). The first were discovered in 1890; five years later sixteen of them were published and analyzed by Scottish archaeologist William Mitchell Ramsay. The texts are basically of a genealogical character (strings of names) and are usually accompanied by a relief picturing the deceased. Recently inscriptions have also been found at Selge, Kesme (near Yeşilbağ), and Deḡirmenözü. Four inscriptions from the Kesme region seem to offer regular text, not merely names. By far the longest of them consists of thirteen lines.

== Pisidian script ==
Pisidian is written left to right in a script that closely resembles the Greek alphabet. A few letters are missing (phi, chi, psi, and possibly theta), and two others were added (characters F and И, both denoting a /w/- or /v/-sound). In recently discovered inscriptions two new signs 𐋌 and ╪ have turned up; they are rare and it is not clear whether they are variants of other signs or entirely different characters (maybe rare sibilants). Texts are written without word dividers.

A typical example (the accompanying relief shows two men and a veiled woman):

ΔΩΤΑΡΙΜΟΣΗΤΩΣΕΙΗΔΩΤ / ΡΙΣΔΩΤΑΡΙΕΝΕΙΣ

Δωταρι Μοσητωσ Ειη Δωτ<α>ρισ Δωταρι Ενεισ

[Here lie] Dotari, [son] of Moseto; Eie [daughter] of Dotari; [and] Dotari [son] of Enei.

Alternatively, the end of the line may (with a different word division) be read as Δωταριε Νεισ, with dative Dotarie, meaning (...) to Dotari [the son] of Nei. In addition, Ειη may also be a dative (= Ειε-ε). The whole line would then mean:

Dotari, [son] of Moseto, [has made this tomb] for Eie [daughter] of Dotari [and] for Dotari [son] of Enei.

== Grammar ==
Due to the monotonous character of the inscriptions, little is known about the grammar. Two cases are assured: nominative and genitive; the presence of a dative is disputed:

case	ending	example	meaning	
Nominative	-Ø	ΔΩΤΑΡΙ	Dotari	(Dotari is a man's name)
Dative	-e (??)	ΔΩΤΑΡΙΕ (?)	to Dotari	(Dotari is a man's name)
Genitive	-s	ΔΩΤΑΡΙΣ	Dotari's	(Dotari is a man's name)

About the verb nothing can be said; Pisidian verbal forms have not yet been found.

== Vocabulary ==
Pisidian personal name Δωτάρι Dotari may reflect the Indo-European root for "daughter". However, as Dotari is documented as a man's name this etymology is not assured.

== See also ==
- Sidetic language

== Bibliography ==
- Simon, Zsolt (2017). "Selected Pisidian problems and the position of Pisidian within the Anatolian languages" (PDF). Journal of Language Relationship. 15 (1): 31–42. doi:10.31826/jlr-2017-151-207. S2CID 212688432.
