= Manava (disambiguation) =

Manava may refer to:

- Manava, an Indian author of the Hindu geometric text of Sulba Sutras
- Manava (king), the son and successor of Shashanka, the king of Gauda, India
- Manava (Pamphylia), a town of ancient Pamphylia
- Manava Naik, an Indian actress

== See also ==
- Manav, an Indian male given name
