= Yuruk =

Yoruk may refer to:

- Yörüks, or Yuruks, a Turkish ethnic subgroup of Oghuz descent
- Yürük rug, a traditional tribal rug woven in Anatolia by the Yörüks
