= Çaltepe =

Çaltepe can refer to:

- Çaltepe, Manavgat
- Çaltepe, Yeşilova
