= Yeniköy, Manavgat =

Yeniköy
- Neighbourhood
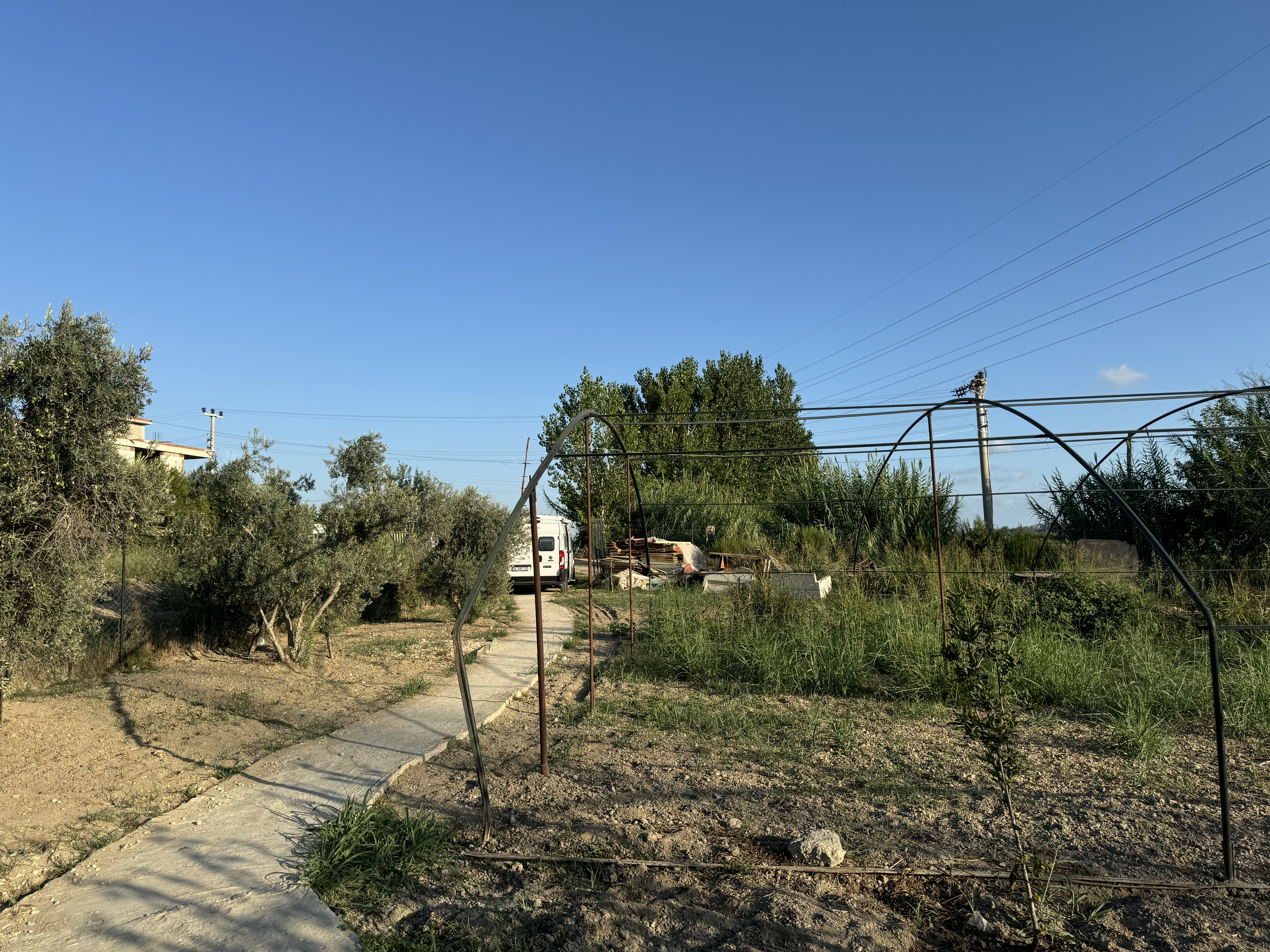

- Location within Turkey
- Coordinates: 36.8450°N 31.3861°E
- Country: Turkey
- Province: Antalya
- District: Manavgat
- Population (2022): 752
- Time zone: UTC+3 (TRT)

Yeniköy is a neighbourhood in the municipality and district of Manavgat, Antalya Province, Turkey. Its population is 752 (2022).
