= Aksaz, Manavgat =

Aksaz
- Neighbourhood
- Location in Turkey
- Coordinates: 36.7806°N 31.5331°E
- Country: Turkey
- Province: Antalya
- District: Manavgat
- Population (2022): 711
- Time zone: UTC+3 (TRT)

Aksaz is a neighbourhood in the municipality and district of Manavgat, Antalya Province, Turkey. Its population is 711 (2022).
