= Seydiler, Manavgat =

Seydiler
- Neighbourhood
- Location in Turkey
- Coordinates: 36.7684°N 31.5371°E
- Country: Turkey
- Province: Antalya
- District: Manavgat
- Population (2022): 500
- Time zone: UTC+3 (TRT)

Seydiler is a neighbourhood in the municipality and district of Manavgat, Antalya Province, Turkey. Its population is 500 (2022).
