= Sağırin, Manavgat =

Sağırin
- Neighbourhood
- Location in Turkey
- Coordinates: 37°01′N 31°14′E
- Country: Turkey
- Province: Antalya
- District: Manavgat
- Population (2022): 1,650
- Time zone: UTC+3 (TRT)

Sağırin is a neighbourhood in the municipality and district of Manavgat, Antalya Province, Turkey. Its population is 1,650 (2022).
