= Çakış, Manavgat =

Çakış
- Neighbourhood
- Location in Turkey
- Coordinates: 36°55′N 31°11′E
- Country: Turkey
- Province: Antalya
- District: Manavgat
- Population (2022): 1,820
- Time zone: UTC+3 (TRT)

Çakış is a neighbourhood in the municipality and district of Manavgat, Antalya Province, Turkey. Its population is 1,820 (2022).
