= Kızılağaç, Manavgat =

Kızılağaç
- Neighbourhood
- Location in Turkey
- Coordinates: 36.7306°N 31.5352°E
- Country: Turkey
- Province: Antalya
- District: Manavgat
- Population (2022): 2,343
- Time zone: UTC+3 (TRT)

Kızılağaç is a neighbourhood in the municipality and district of Manavgat, Antalya Province, Turkey. Its population is 2,343 (2022).
