= Kısalar, Manavgat =

Kısalar
- Neighbourhood
- Location in Turkey
- Coordinates: 36.8419°N 31.2547°E
- Country: Turkey
- Province: Antalya
- District: Manavgat
- Population (2022): 268
- Time zone: UTC+3 (TRT)

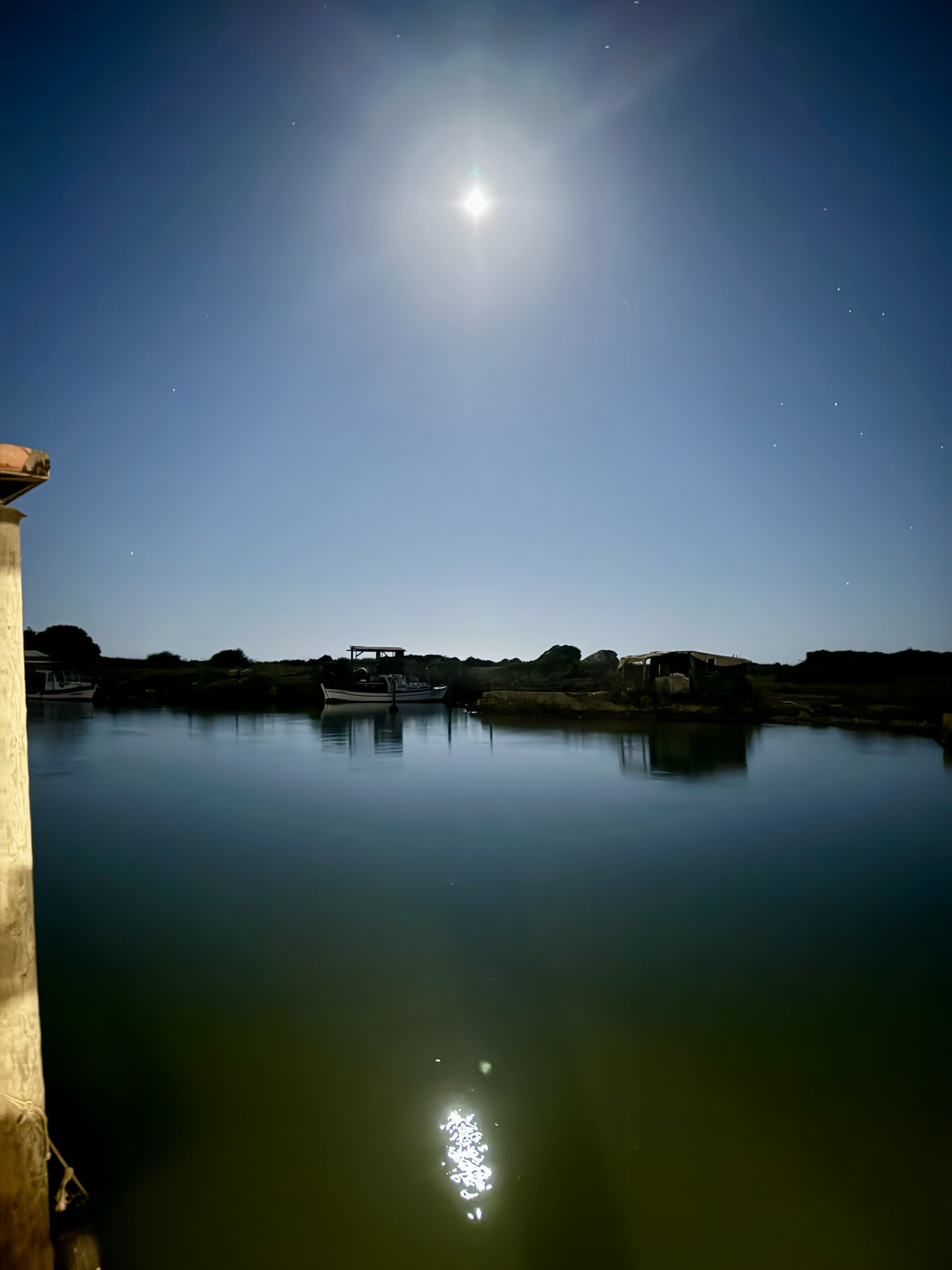
View of Kısalar Gündoğdu Beach

Kısalar is a neighbourhood in the municipality and district of Manavgat, Antalya Province, Turkey. Its population is 268 (2022).
