= Hacıobası, Manavgat =

Hacıobası
- Neighbourhood
- Location in Turkey
- Coordinates: 36.7333°N 31.5833°E
- Country: Turkey
- Province: Antalya
- District: Manavgat
- Population (2022): 571
- Time zone: UTC+3 (TRT)

Hacıobası is a neighbourhood in the municipality and district of Manavgat, Antalya Province, Turkey. Its population is 571 (2022).
