= Boztepe, Manavgat =

Boztepe
- Neighbourhood
- Location in Turkey
- Coordinates: 36.6717°N 31.6742°E
- Country: Turkey
- Province: Antalya
- District: Manavgat
- Population (2022): 543
- Time zone: UTC+3 (TRT)

Boztepe is a neighbourhood in the municipality and district of Manavgat, Antalya Province, Turkey. Its population is 543 (2022).
