= Namaras, Manavgat =

Namaras
- Neighbourhood
- Location in Turkey
- Coordinates: 36.7556°N 31.7344°E
- Country: Turkey
- Province: Antalya
- District: Manavgat
- Population (2022): 156
- Time zone: UTC+3 (TRT)

Namaras (formerly: Çamlıtepe) is a neighbourhood in the municipality and district of Manavgat, Antalya Province, Turkey. Its population is 156 (2022).
