= Kalemler, Manavgat =

Kalemler
- Neighbourhood
- Location in Turkey
- Coordinates: 36.8663°N 31.3593°E
- Country: Turkey
- Province: Antalya
- District: Manavgat
- Population (2022): 309
- Time zone: UTC+3 (TRT)

Kalemler is a neighbourhood in the municipality and district of Manavgat, Antalya Province, Turkey. Its population is 309 (2022).
