= Kızıldağ, Manavgat =

Kızıldağ
- Neighbourhood
- Location in Turkey
- Coordinates: 37.0392°N 31.3556°E
- Country: Turkey
- Province: Antalya
- District: Manavgat
- Population (2022): 786
- Time zone: UTC+3 (TRT)

Kızıldağ is a neighbourhood in the municipality and district of Manavgat, Antalya Province, Turkey. Its population is 786 (2022).
