= Demirciler, Manavgat =

Demirciler
- Neighbourhood
- Location in Turkey
- Coordinates: 36.7918°N 31.5095°E
- Country: Turkey
- Province: Antalya
- District: Manavgat
- Population (2022): 1,337
- Time zone: UTC+3 (TRT)

Demirciler is a neighbourhood in the municipality and district of Manavgat, Antalya Province, Turkey. Its population is 1,337 (2022).
