= Manavgat =

- District and municipality
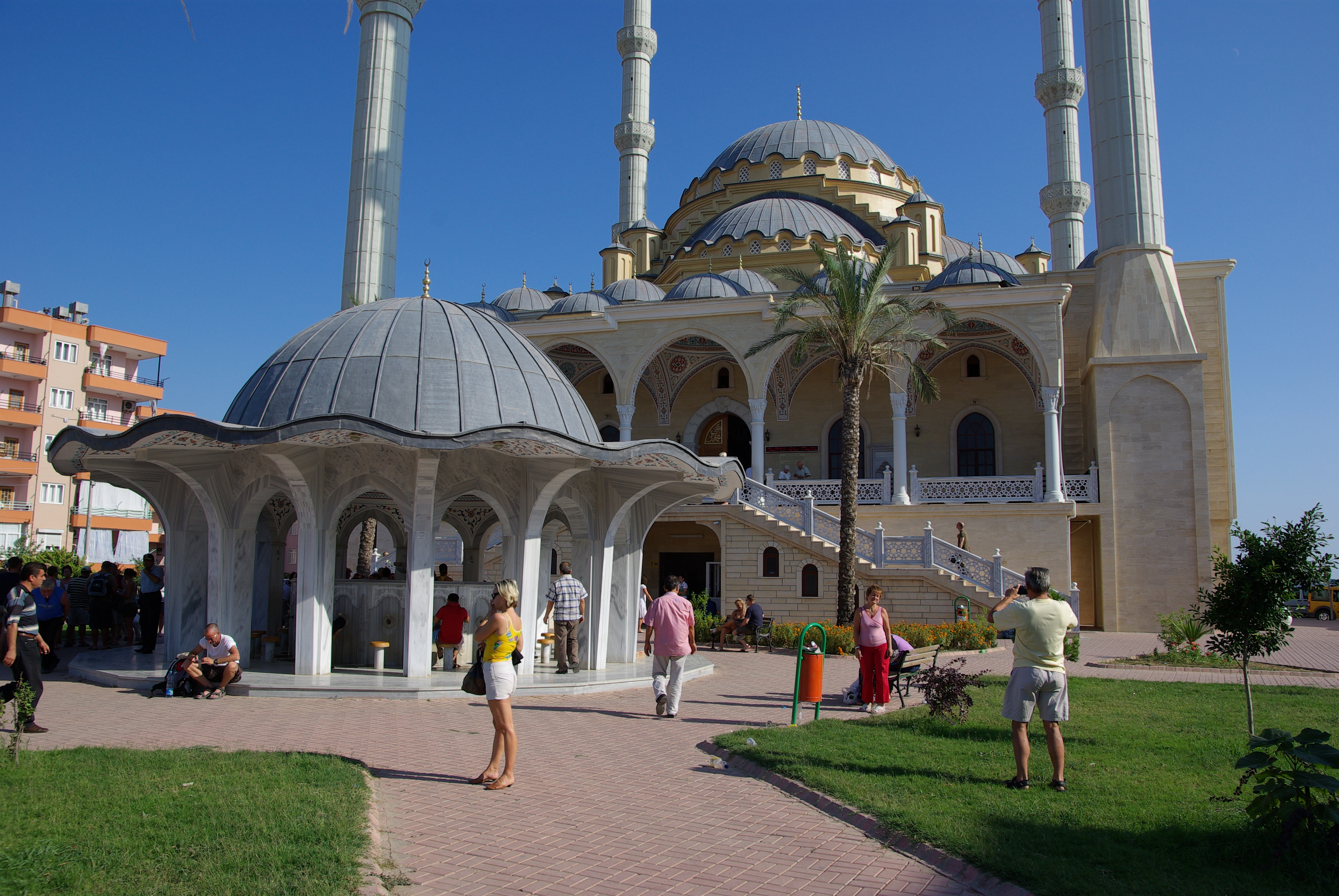
- Mosque in Manavgat

- Logo

- Map showing Manavgat District in Antalya Province

- Location within Turkey
- Coordinates: 36°47′N 31°26′E
- Country: Turkey
- Province: Antalya

Government
  - Mayor: Niyazi Nefi Kara (CHP)
- Area: 2,351 km^{2} (908 sq mi)
- Population (2025): 266,480
  - Density: 113.3/km^{2} (293.6/sq mi)
- Time zone: UTC+3 (TRT)
- Postal code: 07600
- Area code: 0242
- Website: www.manavgat.bel.tr

Manavgat is a municipality and district of Antalya Province, Turkey. Its area is 2,351 km^{2}, and its population is 266,480 (2025). It is 75 km (47 mi) from the city of Antalya. The Manavgat River has a waterfall near the city.

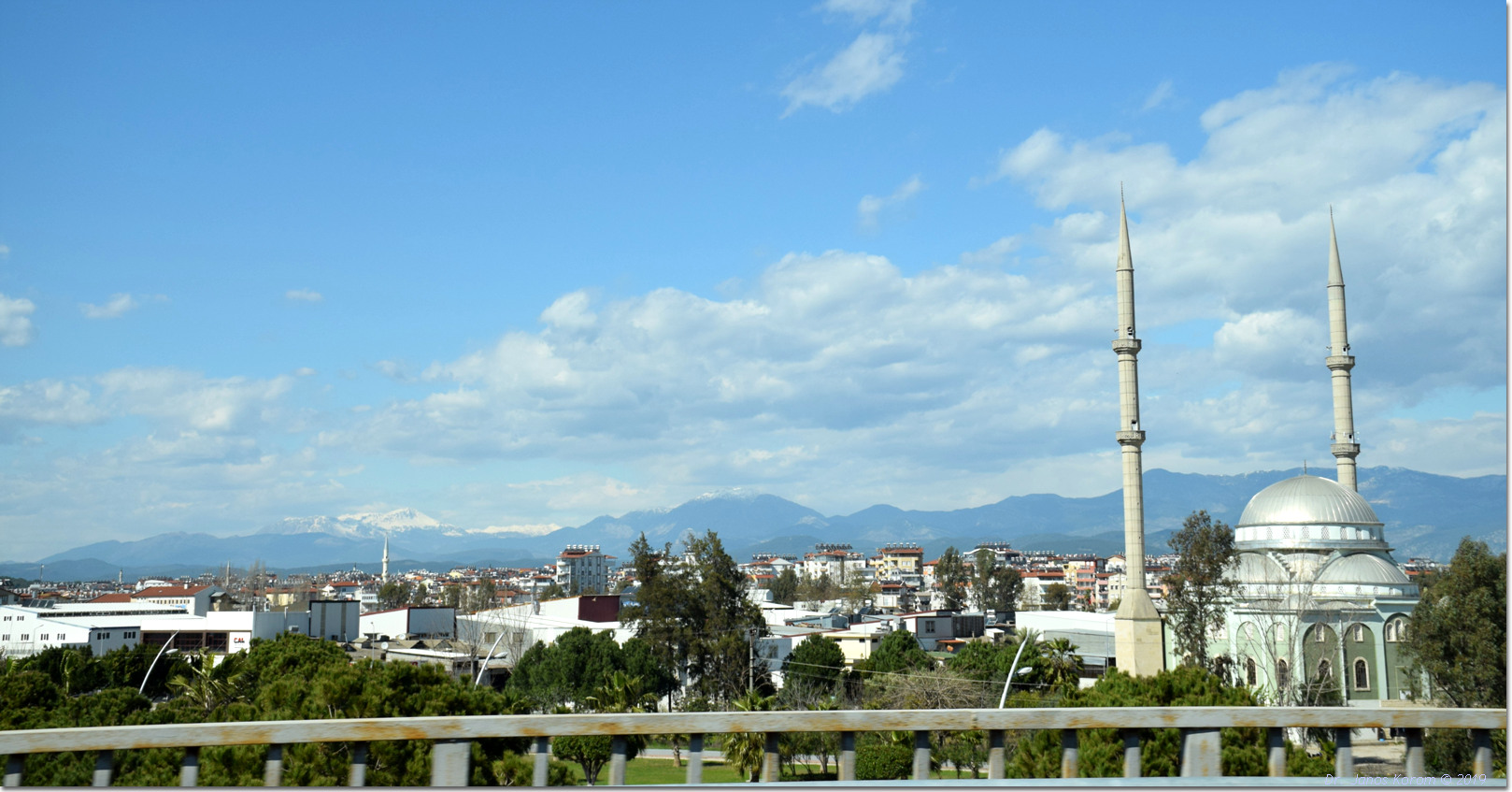
Manavgat skyline

== Geography ==
Between the Taurus Mountains to the north, and the sandy beaches of the Mediterranean coast, much of the district is surrounded by a flat plain. This is mostly fertile farmland and agriculture is well-developed in Manavgat, keeping livestock and growing crops including grains, sesame and many fruits and vegetables; in recent years olives have also been planted. There is no industry except for food-processing, so apart from agriculture the local economy depends on tourism.

The mountains are covered with forests and typical Mediterranean shrubs, there are small plains higher in the mountains too, traditionally used for summer grazing by the yörük nomads. Manavgat has a Mediterranean climate of hot, dry summers and warm, wet winters; the temperature rarely drops to freezing. The district is irrigated by the Manavgat River, and has two dams for hydro-electric power. In 2001 plans began to export water from these reservoirs to Israel and other Mediterranean countries including Malta and Cyprus; as of 2006 these plans are on hold.

=== Climate ===
Manavgat has a hot-summer Mediterranean climate (Köppen: Csa), with very hot, dry summers and mild, rainy winters.

Climate data for Manavgat (1991–2020)
Month	Jan	Feb	Mar	Apr	May	Jun	Jul	Aug	Sep	Oct	Nov	Dec	Year
Mean daily maximum °C (°F)	15.4 (59.7)	16.3 (61.3)	19.0 (66.2)	22.3 (72.1)	26.5 (79.7)	31.2 (88.2)	34.4 (93.9)	34.8 (94.6)	32.1 (89.8)	27.7 (81.9)	21.9 (71.4)	17.1 (62.8)	24.9 (76.8)
Daily mean °C (°F)	10.8 (51.4)	11.4 (52.5)	13.7 (56.7)	16.7 (62.1)	20.9 (69.6)	25.4 (77.7)	28.6 (83.5)	29.0 (84.2)	25.9 (78.6)	21.6 (70.9)	16.2 (61.2)	12.4 (54.3)	19.4 (66.9)
Mean daily minimum °C (°F)	7.3 (45.1)	7.5 (45.5)	9.0 (48.2)	11.6 (52.9)	15.5 (59.9)	19.6 (67.3)	22.8 (73.0)	23.3 (73.9)	20.1 (68.2)	16.3 (61.3)	11.9 (53.4)	8.9 (48.0)	14.5 (58.1)
Average precipitation mm (inches)	252.44 (9.94)	147.81 (5.82)	92.98 (3.66)	47.18 (1.86)	23.16 (0.91)	6.9 (0.27)	1.86 (0.07)	1.75 (0.07)	15.11 (0.59)	117.43 (4.62)	154.31 (6.08)	254.77 (10.03)	1,115.7 (43.93)
Average precipitation days (≥ 1.0 mm)	11.8	8.9	6.3	5.1	3.1	1.7	1.2	1.1	2.1	5.0	6.6	10.3	63.2
Average relative humidity (%)	63.2	61.8	62.5	65.8	65.3	60.4	59.6	60.8	58.8	57.0	60.0	64.1	61.6
Source: NOAA

== History ==
Manavgat takes its name from the city of Manava in Pamphylia in Byzantine times. The ancient cities of Side and Selge date back to the 6th century BC. Manavgat was taken over by the Seljuk Turks in 1220 and the Ottoman Empire in 1472. The town also has a castle named "Zindan Kalesi" literally Dungeon Castle in English.

In July 2021, Manavgat experienced the largest wildfire in Turkey's recent history, which burned approximately 60,000 hectares of forest and agricultural land and resulted in eight fatalities.

== Population ==
Historical population
Year	Pop.	±% p.a.
2007	165,114	—
2008	179,311	+8.60%
2009	179,379	+0.04%
2010	185,134	+3.21%
2011	193,738	+4.65%
2012	201,027	+3.76%
2013	208,526	+3.73%
2014	215,526	+3.36%
2015	222,419	+3.20%
2016	224,664	+1.01%
2017	226,394	+0.77%
2018	230,597	+1.86%
2019	241,011	+4.52%
2020	242,490	+0.61%
2021	245,740	+1.34%
2022	252,941	+2.93%
2023	258,367	+2.15%
2024	262,576	+1.63%
2025	266,480	+1.49%
Source: TÜİK

== Tourism ==
Tourism is an important industry in Manavgat, which has 64 kilometres (40 mi) of coastline, much of it sandy beach, as well as a river, a waterfall, and countryside with mountains and forests. There is accommodation along the coast, and attractions include historical sites, rivers, streams and caves. At the river mouth, swimmers can pass from the river's fresh water into the salt water of the sea. Local cuisine includes fish from the Mediterranean. The coastal villages of Kumköy and Ilıca are tourist resorts.

=== Places of interest ===
- Köprülü Canyon - in the middle of a forested national park; the canyon is popular for river-rafting.
- The antique cities of:
  - Side, with its theatre and port.
  - Seleucia (Pamphylia) - visited by Alexander the Great
  - Selge
- Manavgat Waterfall, and another smaller waterfall on the river.
- Oymapinar Dam
- Tilkiler Cave

== Forest ==
The forested areas of Manavgat are primarily composed of Mediterranean dry conifer forests dominated by Turkish pine (Pinus brutia), alongside maquis shrubland species such as kermes oak (Quercus coccifera) and bay laurel (Laurus nobilis). At higher elevations in the Taurus Mountains, these transition into groves of juniper, oak, and Anatolian black pine (Pinus nigra).

== Composition ==
There are 106 neighbourhoods in Manavgat District:

- Ahmetler
- Aksaz
- Altınkaya
- Aşağıhisar
- Aşağıışıklar
- Aşağıpazarcı
- Aydınevler
- Bahçelievler
- Ballıbucak
- Belenobası
- Bereket
- Beşkonak
- Beydiğin
- Boztepe
- Bucakşeyhler
- Büklüce
- Burmahan
- Çağlayan
- Çakış
- Çaltepe
- Çardakköy
- Çavuşköy
- Çayyazı
- Çeltikçi
- Çenger
- Cevizler
- Çolaklı
- Değirmenözü
- Demirciler
- Denizkent
- Denizyaka
- Dikmen
- Doğançam
- Dolbazlar
- Düzağaç
- Emek
- Eski Hisar
- Evrenleryavşı
- Evrenseki
- Gaziler
- Gebece
- Gençler
- Gültepe
- Gündoğdu
- Güzelyalı
- Hacıali
- Hacıisalı
- Hacıobası
- Halitağalar
- Hatipler
- Hocalar
- Hocalı
- Ilıca
- Kadılar
- Kalemler
- Karabucak
- Karabük
- Karacalar
- Karakaya
- Karaöz
- Karavca
- Kasaplar
- Kavaklı
- Kırkkavak
- Kısalar
- Kızılağaç
- Kızıldağ
- Kızılot
- Milli Egemenlık
- Mimarsinan
- Namaras
- Odaönü
- Örenşehir
- Örnek
- Oymapınar
- Perakende
- Sağırin
- Salkım Evler
- Salur
- Sanayi
- Saraçlı
- Sarılar
- Şelale
- Sevinçköy
- Seydiler
- Side
- Sırtköy
- Şişeler
- Sorgun
- Sülek
- Taşağıl
- Taşkesiği
- Tepeköy
- Tilkiler
- Ulukapı
- Uzunkale
- Uzunlar
- Yalçıdibi
- Yavrudoğan
- Yayla
- Yaylaalan
- Yeniköy
- Yeşilbağ
- Yukarıhisar
- Yukarıışıklar
- Yukarıpazarcı

== Gallery ==
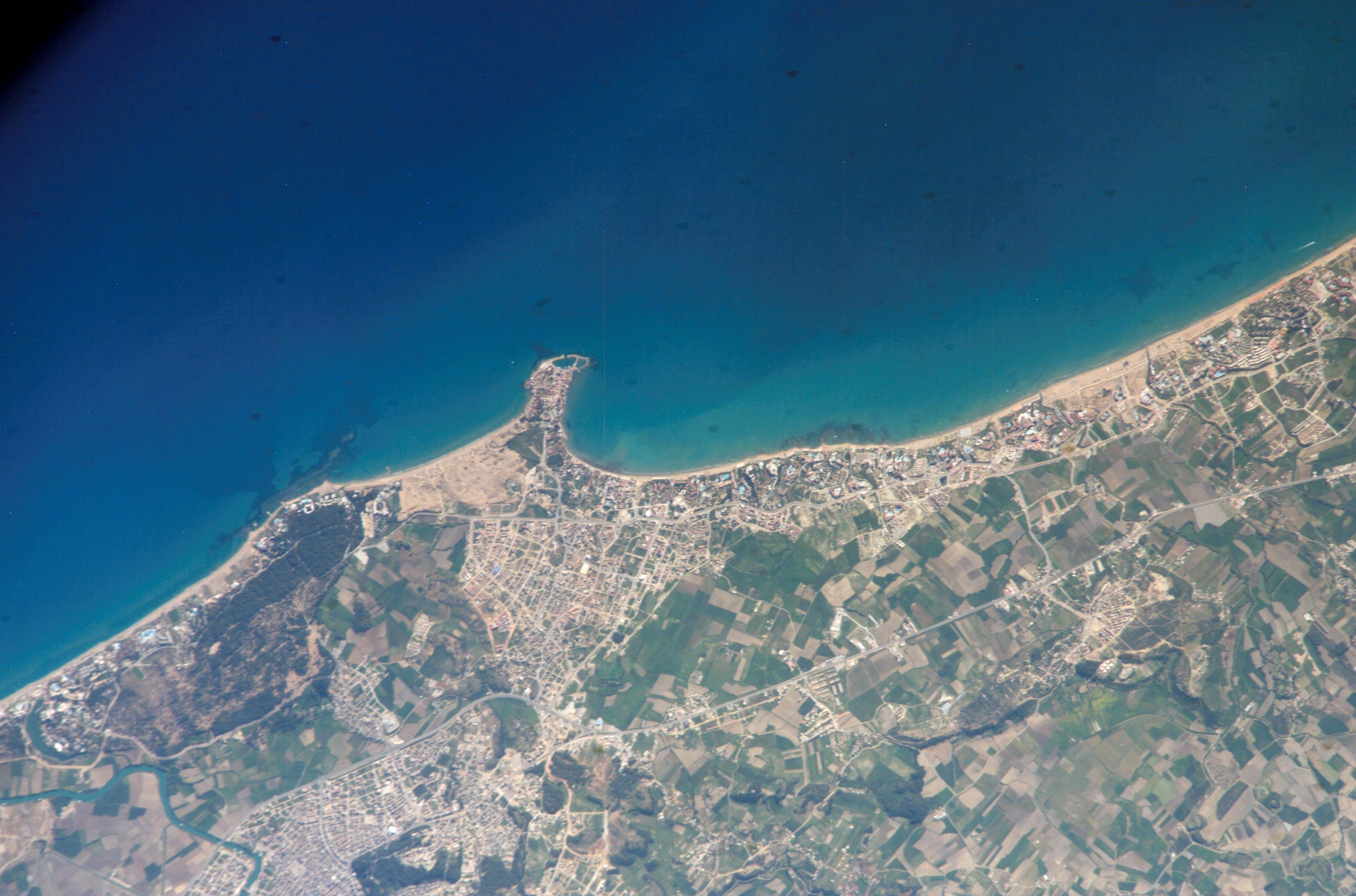
Satellite view of Manavgat and Side

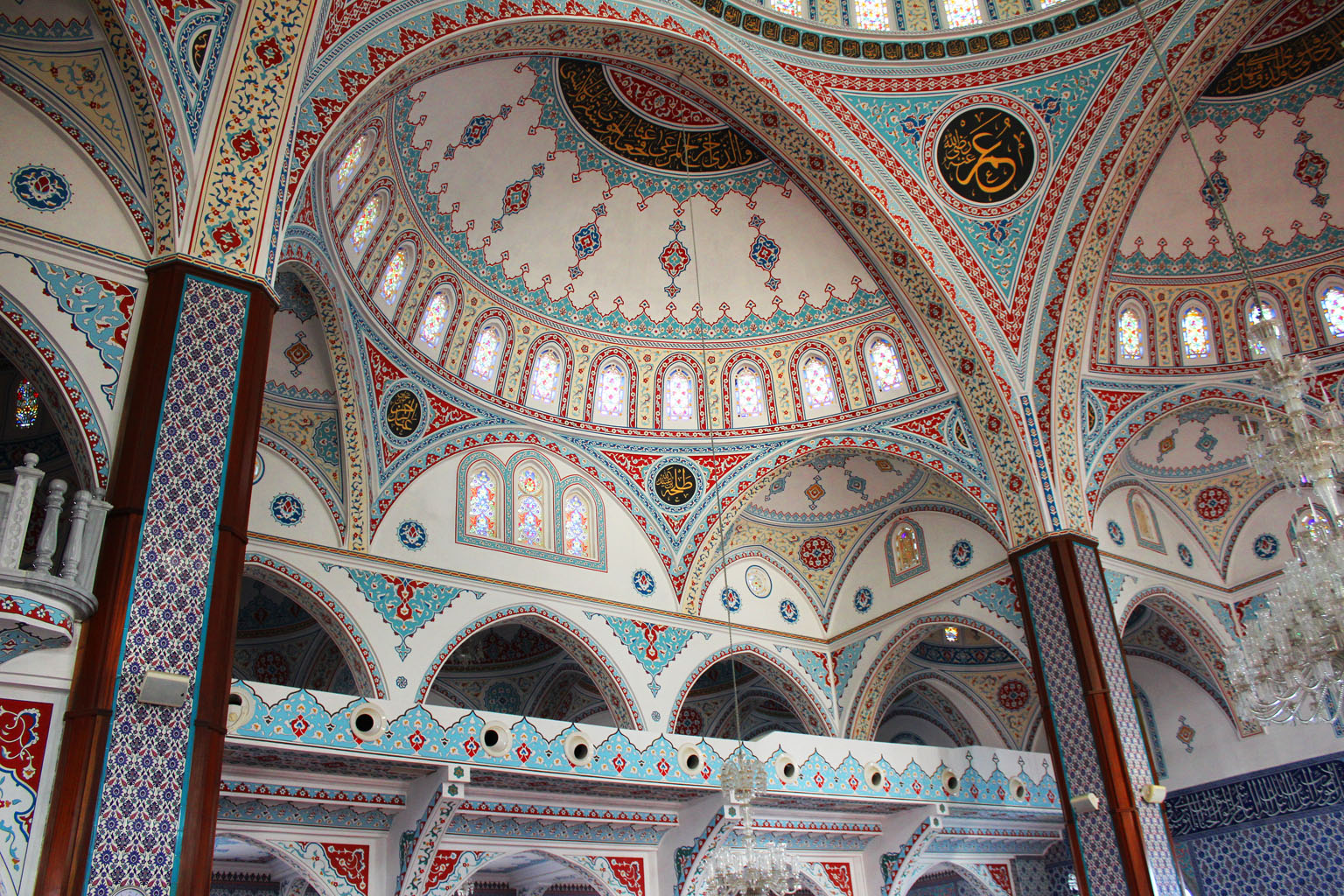
Inside Manavgat Mosque

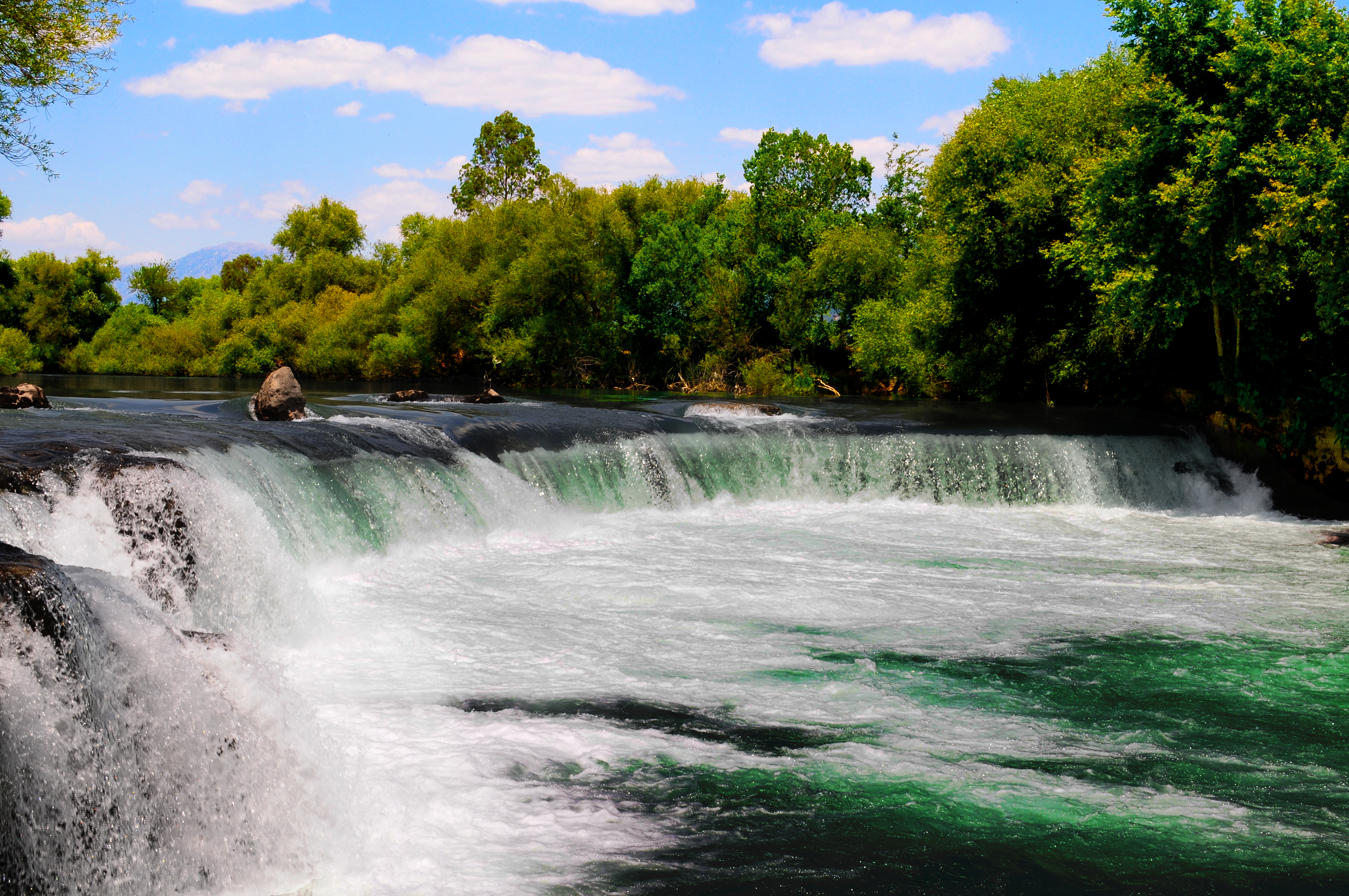
Manavgat Waterfall

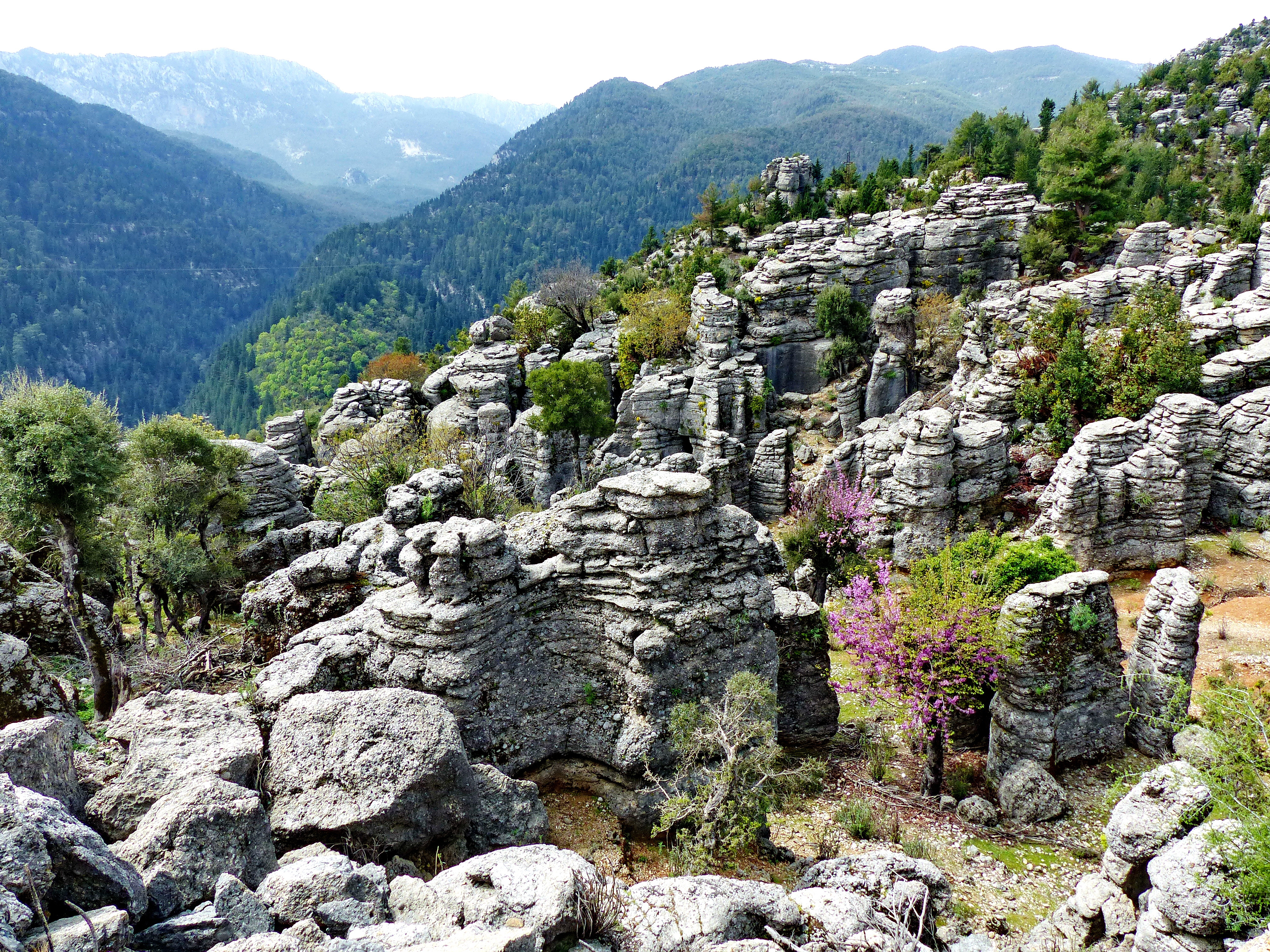
Köprülü Canyon National Park
