= Karaöz, Manavgat =

Karaöz
- Neighbourhood
- Location in Turkey
- Coordinates: 36.7795°N 31.5152°E
- Country: Turkey
- Province: Antalya
- District: Manavgat
- Population (2022): 1,062
- Time zone: UTC+3 (TRT)

Karaöz is a neighbourhood in the municipality and district of Manavgat, Antalya Province, Turkey. Its population is 1,062 (2022).
