= Khojali =

Khojaly, Khojali, Xocalı, Khodzhali, Khojalu, Khadzhaly, Khodzhaly or Khodgalou may refer to:

- Khojaly District, Azerbaijan
- Khojaly (town), Azerbaijan
- Xocalı, Salyan, Azerbaijan
- Khojayli, Uzbekistan, 16 km (10 mi) southwest of Nukus
- Khojali Mountain (3313 m) in Abkhazia
- Khojali Osman, Sudanese artist
- Khojali al-Hassan, Governor in Ethiopia

== See also ==
- Khojaly–Gadabay culture, of the Late Bronze Age to Early Iron Age in the Karabakh region of Transcaucasia
