= Taşkesiği, Manavgat =

Taşkesiği
- Neighbourhood
- Location in Turkey
- Coordinates: 36.7585°N 31.6325°E
- Country: Turkey
- Province: Antalya
- District: Manavgat
- Population (2022): 186
- Time zone: UTC+3 (TRT)

Taşkesiği is a neighbourhood in the municipality and district of Manavgat, Antalya Province, Turkey. Its population is 186 (2022).
