= Beşkonak, Manavgat =

Beşkonak
- Neighbourhood
- Location in Turkey
- Coordinates: 37.1494°N 31.1897°E
- Country: Turkey
- Province: Antalya
- District: Manavgat
- Population (2022): 1,429
- Time zone: UTC+3 (TRT)

Beşkonak (formerly: Bozyaka) is a neighbourhood in the municipality and district of Manavgat, Antalya Province, Turkey. Its population is 1,429 (2022).
