= Aşağıışıklar, Manavgat =

Aşağıışıklar
- Neighbourhood
- Location in Turkey
- Coordinates: 36.7983°N 31.5021°E
- Country: Turkey
- Province: Antalya
- District: Manavgat
- Population (2022): 1,591
- Time zone: UTC+3 (TRT)

Aşağıışıklar is a neighbourhood in the municipality and district of Manavgat, Antalya Province, Turkey. Its population is 1,591 (2022).
