= Perakende, Manavgat =

Perakende
- Neighbourhood
- Location in Turkey
- Coordinates: 36°49′44″N 31°14′01″E
- Country: Turkey
- Province: Antalya
- District: Manavgat
- Population (2022): 160
- Time zone: UTC+3 (TRT)

Perakende is a neighbourhood in the municipality and district of Manavgat, Antalya Province, Turkey. Its population is 160 (2022).
