= Çeltikçi, Manavgat =

Çeltikçi
- Neighbourhood
- Location in Turkey
- Coordinates: 36°47′45″N 31°28′57″E
- Country: Turkey
- Province: Antalya
- District: Manavgat
- Population (2022): 2,753
- Time zone: UTC+3 (TRT)

Çeltikçi is a neighbourhood in the municipality and district of Manavgat, Antalya Province, Turkey. Its population is 2,753 (2022).
