= Kadılar, Manavgat =

Kadılar
- Neighbourhood
- Location in Turkey
- Coordinates: 36.7145°N 31.6366°E
- Country: Turkey
- Province: Antalya
- District: Manavgat
- Population (2022): 176
- Time zone: UTC+3 (TRT)

Kadılar is a neighbourhood in the municipality and district of Manavgat, Antalya Province, Turkey. Its population is 176 (2022).
