= Evrenseki, Manavgat =

Evrenseki
- Neighbourhood
- Location in Turkey
- Coordinates: 36°50′18″N 31°21′20″E
- Country: Turkey
- Province: Antalya
- District: Manavgat
- Population (2022): 3,423
- Time zone: UTC+3 (TRT)

Evrenseki is a neighbourhood in the municipality and district of Manavgat, Antalya Province, Turkey. Its population is 3,423 (2022). Before the 2013 reorganisation, it was a town (belde).
