= Altınkaya, Manavgat =

Altınkaya
- Neighbourhood
- Location in Turkey
- Coordinates: 37.2333°N 31.1289°E
- Country: Turkey
- Province: Antalya
- District: Manavgat
- Population (2022): 345
- Time zone: UTC+3 (TRT)

Altınkaya is a neighbourhood in the municipality and district of Manavgat, Antalya Province, Turkey. total population is 345 (2022).
