= Şişeler, Manavgat =

Şişeler
- Neighbourhood
- Location in Turkey
- Coordinates: 36°52′N 31°24′E
- Country: Turkey
- Province: Antalya
- District: Manavgat
- Population (2022): 222
- Time zone: UTC+3 (TRT)

Şişeler is a neighbourhood in the municipality and district of Manavgat, Antalya Province, Turkey. Its population is 222 (2022).
