= Belenobası, Manavgat =

Belenobası
- Neighbourhood
- Location in Turkey
- Coordinates: 36°49′N 31°35′E
- Country: Turkey
- Province: Antalya
- District: Manavgat
- Population (2022): 803
- Time zone: UTC+3 (TRT)

Belenobası is a neighbourhood in the municipality and district of Manavgat, Antalya Province, Turkey. Its population is 803 (2022).
