= Sarılar, Manavgat =

Sarılar
- Neighbourhood
- Location in Turkey
- Coordinates: 36.8116°N 31.4321°E
- Country: Turkey
- Province: Antalya
- District: Manavgat
- Population (2022): 26,776
- Time zone: UTC+3 (TRT)

Sarılar is a neighbourhood in the municipality and district of Manavgat, Antalya Province, Turkey. Its population is 26,776 (2022). Before the 2013 reorganisation, it was a town (belde).
