= Ulukapı, Manavgat =

Ulukapı
- Neighbourhood
- Location in Turkey
- Coordinates: 36.8167°N 31.5000°E
- Country: Turkey
- Province: Antalya
- District: Manavgat
- Population (2022): 3,545
- Time zone: UTC+3 (TRT)

Ulukapı is a neighbourhood in the municipality and district of Manavgat, Antalya Province, Turkey. Its population is 3,545 (2022).
