= Karabucak, Manavgat =

Karabucak
- Neighbourhood
- Location in Turkey
- Coordinates: 37.0442°N 31.2983°E
- Country: Turkey
- Province: Antalya
- District: Manavgat
- Population (2022): 539
- Time zone: UTC+3 (TRT)

Karabucak is a neighbourhood in the municipality and district of Manavgat, Antalya Province, Turkey. Its population is 539 (2022).
