= Yalçıdibi, Manavgat =

Yalçıdibi
- Neighbourhood
- Location in Turkey
- Coordinates: 36°42′N 31°41′E
- Country: Turkey
- Province: Antalya
- District: Manavgat
- Population (2022): 209
- Time zone: UTC+3 (TRT)

Yalçıdibi is a neighbourhood in the municipality and district of Manavgat, Antalya Province, Turkey. Its population is 209 (2022).
