= Gaziler, Manavgat =

Gaziler
- Neighbourhood
- Location in Turkey
- Coordinates: 37.2561°N 31.1844°E
- Country: Turkey
- Province: Antalya
- District: Manavgat
- Population (2022): 159
- Time zone: UTC+3 (TRT)

Gaziler is a neighbourhood in the municipality and district of Manavgat, Antalya Province, Turkey. Its population is 159 (2022).
