= Örenşehir, Manavgat =

Örenşehir
- Neighbourhood
- Location in Turkey
- Coordinates: 36.6978°N 31.6610°E
- Country: Turkey
- Province: Antalya
- District: Manavgat
- Population (2022): 965
- Time zone: UTC+3 (TRT)

Örenşehir is a neighbourhood in the municipality and district of Manavgat, Antalya Province, Turkey. Its population is 965 (2022).
