= Çolaklı, Manavgat =

Çolaklı
- Neighbourhood
- Location in Turkey
- Coordinates: 36°50′15″N 31°19′06″E
- Country: Turkey
- Province: Antalya
- District: Manavgat
- Population (2022): 7,190
- Time zone: UTC+3 (TRT)

Çolaklı is a neighbourhood in the municipality and district of Manavgat, Antalya Province, Turkey. Its population is 7,190 (2022). Before the 2013 reorganisation, it was a town (belde).
