= Çenger, Manavgat =

Çenger
- Neighbourhood
- Location in Turkey
- Coordinates: 36.6901°N 31.6234°E
- Country: Turkey
- Province: Antalya
- District: Manavgat
- Population (2022): 917
- Time zone: UTC+3 (TRT)

Çenger is a neighbourhood in the municipality and district of Manavgat, Antalya Province, Turkey. Its population is 917 (2022).
