= Gençler, Manavgat =

Gençler
- Neighbourhood
- Location in Turkey
- Coordinates: 36.7829°N 31.7103°E
- Country: Turkey
- Province: Antalya
- District: Manavgat
- Population (2022): 267
- Time zone: UTC+3 (TRT)

Gençler is a neighbourhood in the municipality and district of Manavgat, Antalya Province, Turkey. Its population is 267 (2022).
