= Dikmen, Manavgat =

Dikmen
- Neighbourhood
- Location in Turkey
- Coordinates: 36.8517°N 31.4497°E
- Country: Turkey
- Province: Antalya
- District: Manavgat
- Population (2022): 1,057
- Time zone: UTC+3 (TRT)

Dikmen is a neighbourhood in the municipality and district of Manavgat, Antalya Province, Turkey. Its population is 1,057 (2022).
