= Hacıisalı, Manavgat =

Hacıisalı
- Neighbourhood
- Location in Turkey
- Coordinates: 36°46′N 31°35′E
- Country: Turkey
- Province: Antalya
- District: Manavgat
- Population (2022): 364
- Time zone: UTC+3 (TRT)

Hacıisalı is a neighbourhood in the municipality and district of Manavgat, Antalya Province, Turkey. Its population is 364 (2022).
