= Karavca, Manavgat =

Karavca
- Neighbourhood
- Location in Turkey
- Coordinates: 36.8581°N 31.5533°E
- Country: Turkey
- Province: Antalya
- District: Manavgat
- Population (2022): 368
- Time zone: UTC+3 (TRT)

Karavca (formerly: Değirmenli) is a neighbourhood in the municipality and district of Manavgat, Antalya Province, Turkey. Its population is 368 (2022).
