= Doğançam, Manavgat =

Coordinates: 36.7637°N 31.5267°E

Doğançam
- Neighbourhood
- Location in Turkey
- Coordinates
- Country: Turkey
- Province: Antalya
- District: Manavgat
- Population (2022): 671
- Time zone: UTC+3 (TRT)

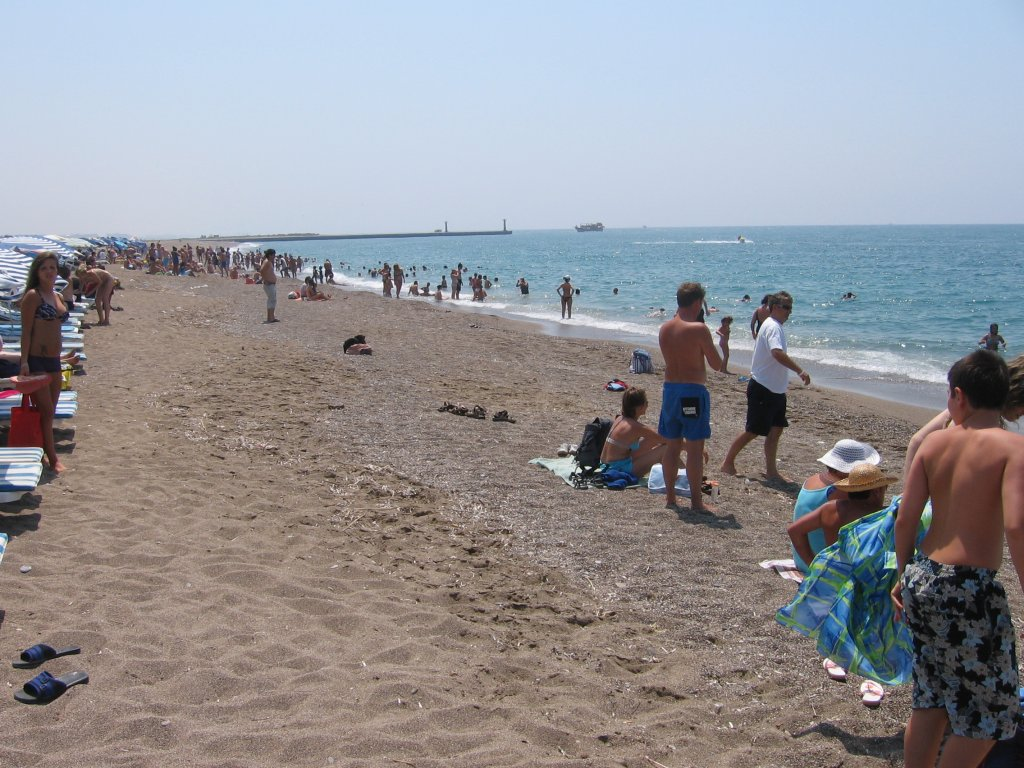
Beach near Manavgat

Doğançam is a neighbourhood in the municipality and district of Manavgat, Antalya Province, Turkey. Its population is 671 (2022).
