= Hocalar, Manavgat =

Hocalar
- Neighbourhood
- Location in Turkey
- Coordinates: 36.8906°N 31.2733°E
- Country: Turkey
- Province: Antalya
- District: Manavgat
- Population (2022): 513
- Time zone: UTC+3 (TRT)

Hocalar is a neighbourhood in the municipality and district of Manavgat, Antalya Province, Turkey. Its population is 513 (2022).
