= Tilkiler, Manavgat =

Tilkiler
- Neighbourhood
- Country: Turkey
- Province: Antalya
- District: Manavgat
- Population (2022): 116
- Time zone: UTC+3 (TRT)

Tilkiler is a neighbourhood in the municipality and district of Manavgat, Antalya Province, Turkey. Its population is 116 (2022).

== See also ==
- Tilkiler Cave
