= Taşağıl, Manavgat =

Taşağıl
- Neighbourhood
- Location in Turkey
- Coordinates: 36.9224°N 31.2361°E
- Country: Turkey
- Province: Antalya
- District: Manavgat
- Population (2022): 4,645
- Time zone: UTC+3 (TRT)

Taşağıl is a neighbourhood in the municipality and district of Manavgat, Antalya Province, Turkey. Its population is 4,645 (2022). Before the 2013 reorganisation, it was a town (belde).
