= Salur, Manavgat =

Salur
- Neighbourhood
- Location in Turkey
- Coordinates: 36.9286°N 31.4125°E
- Country: Turkey
- Province: Antalya
- District: Manavgat
- Population (2022): 115
- Time zone: UTC+3 (TRT)

Salur is a neighbourhood in the municipality and district of Manavgat, Antalya Province, Turkey. Its population is 115 (2022).
