= Çardakköy, Manavgat =

Çardakköy
- Neighbourhood
- Location in Turkey
- Coordinates: 36.9703°N 31.2900°E
- Country: Turkey
- Province: Antalya
- District: Manavgat
- Population (2022): 944
- Time zone: UTC+3 (TRT)

Çardakköy is a neighbourhood in the municipality and district of Manavgat, Antalya Province, Turkey. Its population is 944 (2022).
