= Beydiğin, Manavgat =

Beydiğin
- Neighbourhood
- Location in Turkey
- Coordinates: 37.0288°N 31.3762°E
- Country: Turkey
- Province: Antalya
- District: Manavgat
- Population (2022): 303
- Time zone: UTC+3 (TRT)

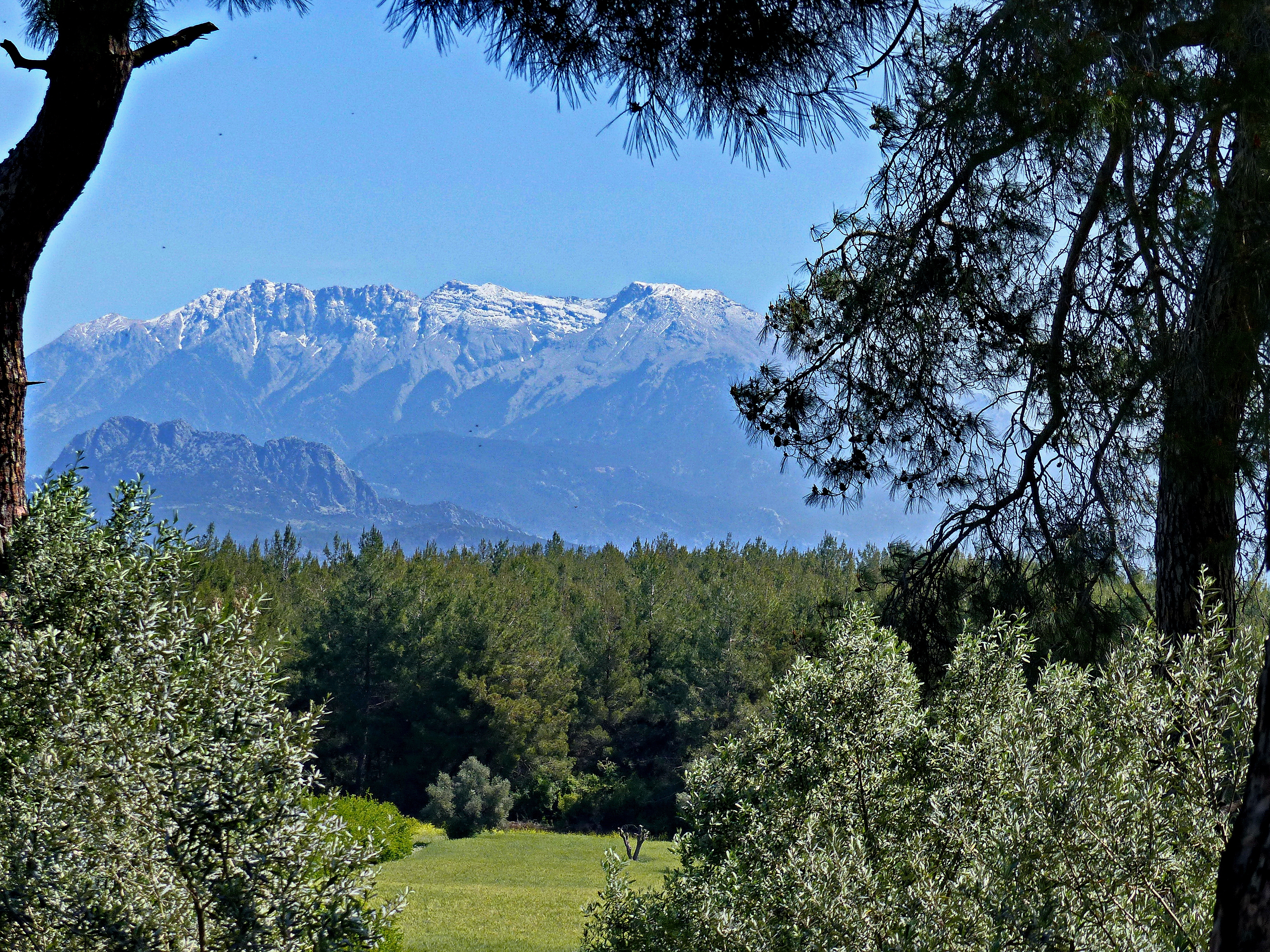
A scenic view from Beydiğin

Beydiğin is a neighbourhood in the municipality and district of Manavgat, Antalya Province, Turkey. Its population is 303 (2022).

== History ==
The first history of the neighbourhood dates back to the 16th century. A primary school was opened in 1940. 93 men of the neighbourhood served in the first world war with many killed.

Today the village economy is based on agriculture and animal husbandry, especially beekeeping.
