= Halitağalar, Manavgat =

Halitağalar
- Neighbourhood
- Location in Turkey
- Coordinates: 36°45′N 31°40′E
- Country: Turkey
- Province: Antalya
- District: Manavgat
- Population (2022): 225
- Time zone: UTC+3 (TRT)

Halitağalar is a neighbourhood in the municipality and district of Manavgat, Antalya Province, Turkey. Its population is 225 (2022).
