= Dolbazlar, Manavgat =

Dolbazlar
- Neighbourhood
- Location in Turkey
- Coordinates: 36°51′N 31°26′E
- Country: Turkey
- Province: Antalya
- District: Manavgat
- Population (2022): 592
- Time zone: UTC+3 (TRT)

Dolbazlar is a neighbourhood in the municipality and district of Manavgat, Antalya Province, Turkey. Its population is 592 (2022).
