= Evrenleryavşı, Manavgat =

Evrenleryavşı
- Neighbourhood
- Location in Turkey
- Coordinates: 36°52′N 31°25′E
- Country: Turkey
- Province: Antalya
- District: Manavgat
- Population (2022): 409
- Time zone: UTC+3 (TRT)

Evrenleryavşı is a neighbourhood in the municipality and district of Manavgat, Antalya Province, Turkey. Its population is 409 (2022).
