= Düzağaç, Manavgat =

Düzağaç
- Neighbourhood
- Location in Turkey
- Coordinates: 37.2356°N 31.2580°E
- Country: Turkey
- Province: Antalya
- District: Manavgat
- Population (2022): 484
- Time zone: UTC+3 (TRT)

Düzağaç is a neighbourhood in the municipality and district of Manavgat, Antalya Province, Turkey. Its population is 484 (2022).
