= Çavuşköy, Manavgat =

Çavuşköy
- Neighbourhood
- Country: Turkey
- Province: Antalya
- District: Manavgat
- Population (2022): 941
- Time zone: UTC+3 (TRT)

Çavuşköy is a neighbourhood in the municipality and district of Manavgat, Antalya Province, Turkey. Its population is 941 (2022).
