= Gültepe, Manavgat =

Gültepe
- Neighbourhood
- Location in Turkey
- Coordinates: 36.8211°N 31.3747°E
- Country: Turkey
- Province: Antalya
- District: Manavgat
- Population (2022): 2,226
- Time zone: UTC+3 (TRT)

Gültepe is a neighbourhood in the municipality and district of Manavgat, Antalya Province of Turkey. Its population is 2,226 (2022).
