= Burmahan, Manavgat =

Burmahan
- Neighbourhood
- Location in Turkey
- Coordinates: 37.1838°N 31.2735°E
- Country: Turkey
- Province: Antalya
- District: Manavgat
- Population (2022): 483
- Time zone: UTC+3 (TRT)

Burmahan is a neighbourhood in the municipality and district of Manavgat, Antalya Province, Turkey. Its population is 483 (2022).
