= Karakaya, Manavgat =

Karakaya
- Neighbourhood
- Location in Turkey
- Coordinates: 36.6961°N 31.7092°E
- Country: Turkey
- Province: Antalya
- District: Manavgat
- Population (2022): 459
- Time zone: UTC+3 (TRT)

Karakaya is a neighbourhood in the municipality and district of Manavgat, Antalya Province, Turkey. Its population is 459 (2022).
