= Yaylaalan, Manavgat =

Yaylaalan
- Neighbourhood
- Location in Turkey
- Coordinates: 36°57′N 31°29′E
- Country: Turkey
- Province: Antalya
- District: Manavgat
- Population (2022): 460
- Time zone: UTC+3 (TRT)

Yaylaalan is a neighbourhood in the municipality and district of Manavgat, Antalya Province, Turkey. Its population is 460 (2022).
