= Saraçlı, Manavgat =

Saraçlı
- Neighbourhood
- Location in Turkey
- Coordinates: 36.8479°N 31.5961°E
- Country: Turkey
- Province: Antalya
- District: Manavgat
- Population (2022): 508
- Time zone: UTC+3 (TRT)

Saraçlı is a neighbourhood in the municipality and district of Manavgat, Antalya Province, Turkey. Its population is 508 (2022).
