= Güzelyalı, Manavgat =

Güzelyalı
- Neighbourhood
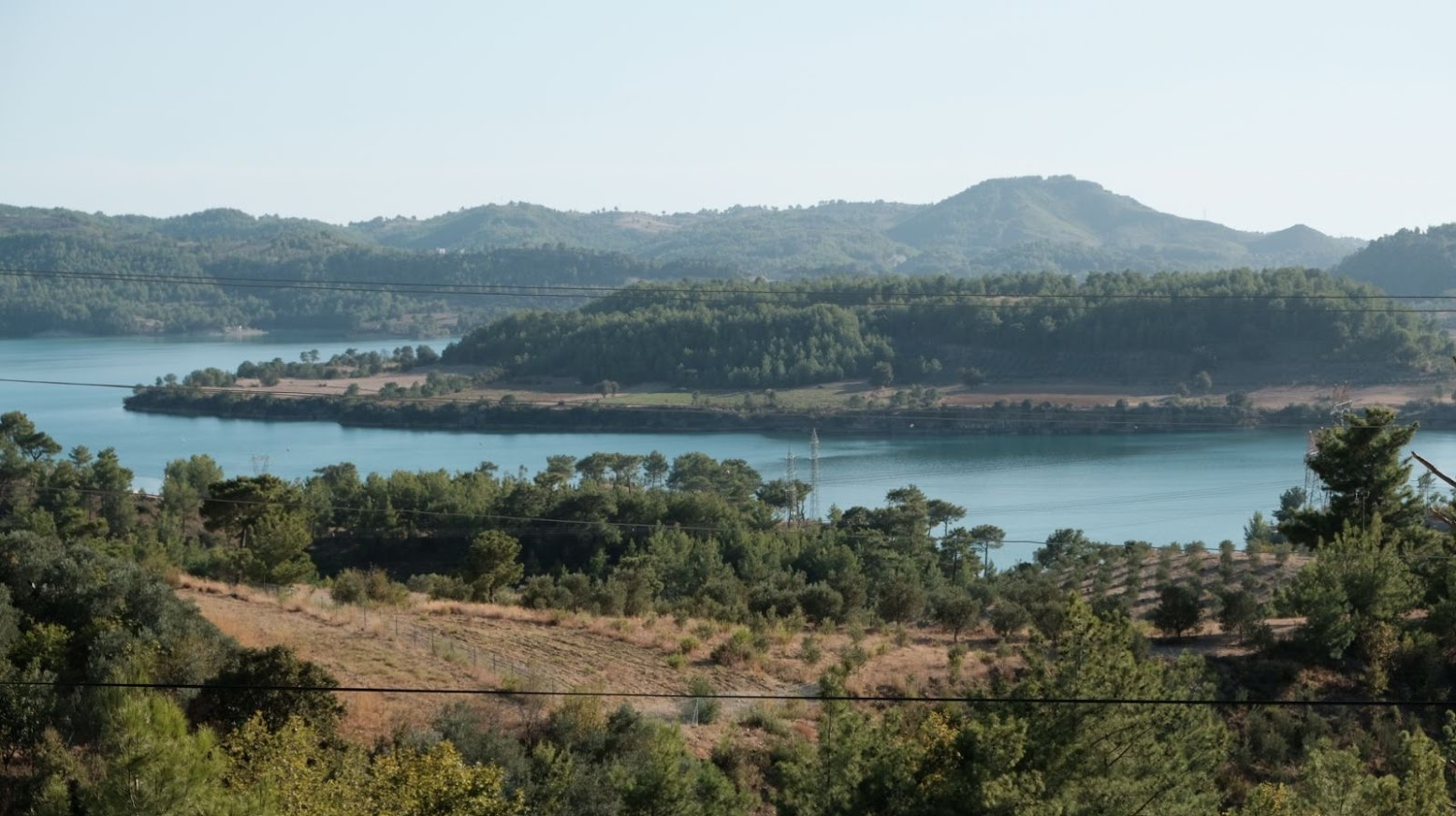
- Guzelyali (c. 2020)

- Location within Turkey
- Country: Turkey
- Province: Antalya
- District: Manavgat
- Population (2022): 173
- Time zone: UTC+3 (TRT)

Güzelyalı is a neighbourhood in the municipality and district of Manavgat, Antalya Province, Turkey. Its population is 173 (2022).
