= Denizkent, Manavgat =

Denizkent
- Neighbourhood
- Location in Turkey
- Coordinates: 36°50′N 31°12′E
- Country: Turkey
- Province: Antalya
- District: Manavgat
- Population (2022): 288
- Time zone: UTC+3 (TRT)

Denizkent is a neighbourhood in the municipality and district of Manavgat, Antalya Province, Turkey. Its population is 288 (2022).
