= Bereket, Manavgat =

Bereket
- Neighbourhood
- Location in Turkey
- Coordinates: 36.8850°N 31.2114°E
- Country: Turkey
- Province: Antalya
- District: Manavgat
- Population (2022): 611
- Time zone: UTC+3 (TRT)

Bereket is a neighbourhood in the municipality and district of Manavgat, Antalya Province, Turkey. Its population is 611 (2022).
