= Yavrudoğan, Manavgat =

Yavrudoğan
- Neighbourhood
- Location in Turkey
- Coordinates: 36°53′N 31°19′E
- Country: Turkey
- Province: Antalya
- District: Manavgat
- Population (2022): 1,749
- Time zone: UTC+3 (TRT)

Yavrudoğan is a neighbourhood in the municipality and district of Manavgat, Antalya Province, Turkey. Its population is 1,749 (2022).
