= Ahmetler, Manavgat =

Ahmetler
- Neighbourhood
- Location in Turkey
- Coordinates: 36.8271°N 31.6987°E
- Country: Turkey
- Province: Antalya
- District: Manavgat
- Population (2022): 239
- Time zone: UTC+3 (TRT)

Ahmetler is a neighbourhood in the municipality and district of Manavgat, Antalya Province, Turkey. Its population is 239 (2022).
