= Tepeköy, Manavgat =

Tepeköy
- Neighbourhood
- Location in Turkey
- Coordinates: 36.8008°N 31.6337°E
- Country: Turkey
- Province: Antalya
- District: Manavgat
- Population (2022): 87
- Time zone: UTC+3 (TRT)

Tepeköy is a neighbourhood in the municipality and district of Manavgat, Antalya Province, Turkey. Its population is 87 (2022).
