= Cevizler, Manavgat =

Cevizler
- Neighbourhood
- Location in Turkey
- Coordinates: 36°46′N 31°33′E
- Country: Turkey
- Province: Antalya
- District: Manavgat
- Population (2022): 257
- Time zone: UTC+3 (TRT)

Cevizler is a neighbourhood in the municipality and district of Manavgat, Antalya Province, Turkey. Its population is 257 (2022).
