= Kırkkavak, Manavgat =

Kırkkavak
- Neighbourhood
- Location in Turkey
- Coordinates: 37.3191°N 31.3021°E
- Country: Turkey
- Province: Antalya
- District: Manavgat
- Population (2022): 355
- Time zone: UTC+3 (TRT)

Kırkkavak is a neighbourhood in the municipality and district of Manavgat, Antalya Province, Turkey. Its population is 355 (2022).
