= Uzunlar, Manavgat =

Uzunlar
- Neighbourhood
- Location in Turkey
- Coordinates: 36.7271°N 31.6436°E
- Country: Turkey
- Province: Antalya
- District: Manavgat
- Population (2022): 348
- Time zone: UTC+3 (TRT)

Uzunlar is a neighbourhood in the municipality and district of Manavgat, Antalya Province, Turkey. Its population is 348 (2022).
