= Odaönü, Manavgat =

Odaönü
- Neighbourhood
- Location in Turkey
- Coordinates: 36°41′N 31°41′E
- Country: Turkey
- Province: Antalya
- District: Manavgat
- Population (2022): 309
- Time zone: UTC+3 (TRT)

Odaönü is a neighbourhood in the municipality and district of Manavgat, Antalya Province, Turkey. Its population is 309 (2022).
