= Karabük, Manavgat =

Karabük
- Neighbourhood
- Location in Turkey
- Coordinates: 37.1530°N 31.1730°E
- Country: Turkey
- Province: Antalya
- District: Manavgat
- Population (2022): 575
- Time zone: UTC+3 (TRT)

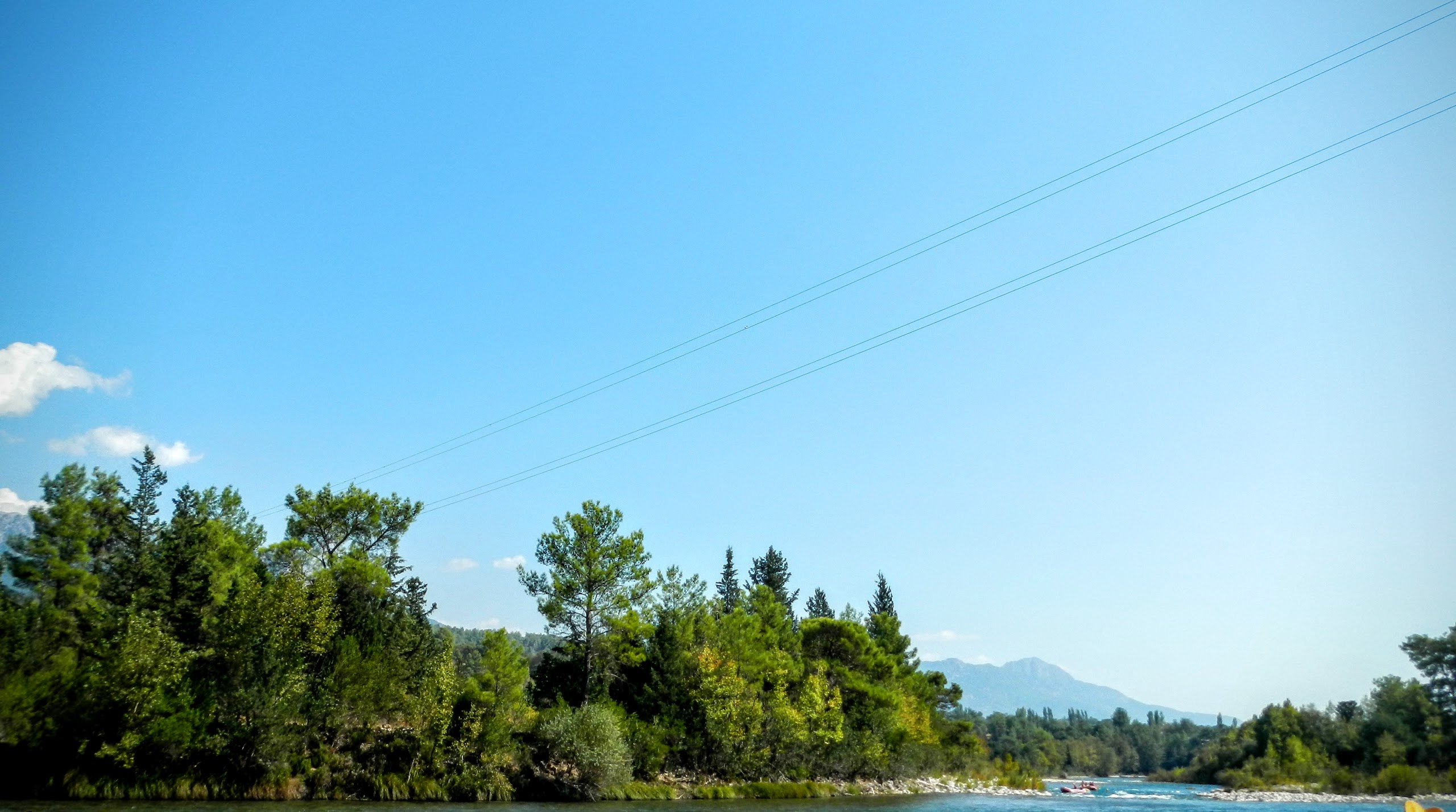
Karabük, Manavgat

Karabük is a neighbourhood in the municipality and district of Manavgat, Antalya Province, Turkey. Its population is 575 (2022).
