= Manavand =

Manavand or Menavand (Persian: مناوند) may refer to:

- Manavand, Darmian
- Manavand, Zirkuh

== See also ==
- Minavand
