= Hatipler, Manavgat =

Hatipler
- Neighbourhood
- Location in Turkey
- Coordinates: 36.8113°N 31.4111°E
- Country: Turkey
- Province: Antalya
- District: Manavgat
- Population (2022): 3,477
- Time zone: UTC+3 (TRT)

Hatipler is a neighbourhood in the municipality and district of Manavgat, Antalya Province, Turkey. Its population is 3,477 (2022).
