= Yukarıışıklar, Manavgat =

Yukarıışıklar
- Neighbourhood
- Location in Turkey
- Coordinates: 36.871°N 31.433°E
- Country: Turkey
- Province: Antalya
- District: Manavgat
- Population (2022): 822
- Time zone: UTC+3 (TRT)

Yukarıışıklar is a neighbourhood in the municipality and district of Manavgat, Antalya Province, Turkey. Its population is 822 (2022).
