= Denizyaka, Manavgat =

Denizyaka
- Neighbourhood
- Location in Turkey
- Coordinates: 36°51′N 31°11′E
- Country: Turkey
- Province: Antalya
- District: Manavgat
- Population (2022): 507
- Time zone: UTC+3 (TRT)

Denizyaka is a neighbourhood in the municipality and district of Manavgat, Antalya Province, Turkey. Its population is 507 (2022).
