= Gebece, Manavgat =

Gebece
- Neighbourhood
- Location in Turkey
- Coordinates: 36°50′N 31°39′E
- Country: Turkey
- Province: Antalya
- District: Manavgat
- Population (2022): 687
- Time zone: UTC+3 (TRT)

Gebece is a neighbourhood in the municipality and district of Manavgat, Antalya Province, Turkey. Its population is 687 (2022).
