= Tilkiler Cave =

Cave in Turkey

- Tilkiler Mağarası
- Location within Turkey
- Location: Tilkiler village, Manavgat, Antalya, Turkey
- Coordinates: 36°55′10″N 31°31′15″E
- Depth: 159 m (522 ft)
- Length: 6,650 m (21,820 ft)
- Elevation: 159 m (522 ft)
- Discovery: 1976; 50 years ago
- Hazards: Cave floods in springtime

Tilkiler Cave, a.k.a. Tilkiler Sinkhole, (Turkish: Tilkiler Mağarası a.k.a. Tilkiler Düdeni) is a cave located in Manavgat district of Antalya in southern Turkey. It is named after the nearby village Tilkiler.

It is situated east of Tilkiler village and about 4 km (2.5 mi) northwest of Oymapınar Dam at 150 m (490 ft) above sea level. The distance from Manavgat is about 20 km (12 mi). Tilkiler Cave was discovered in 1976 during the preparatory construction works at Oymapınar Dam while excavating an injection gallery. The horizontal developed cave has a length of 6,650 m (21,820 ft) and is 159 m (522 ft) deep. It is the country's third longest one.

The cave was constituted in the Miocene conglomerate rock formation. It is also partly formed in limestone. These characteristics make it valuable for scientific research. The ponds inside the cave are at different elevations. Water level varies between summer and winter ranging between 68 and 128 m (223 and 420 ft). The cave floods in springtime. A few kilometers from the entrance, there is a hall, where the ground is completely covered with sand. In 1977, French speleologists built four small sand castles there that gave the hall the name "Hall of Castles". It was observed 27 years later that the sand castles were still intact.
