= Yürük rug =

Tribal rug woven in Anatolia

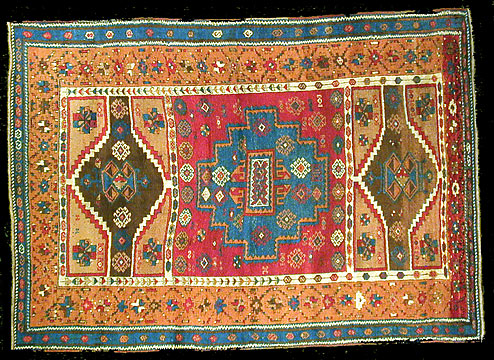
A Yuruk rug, circa 1880

A Yürük rug is a traditional tribal rug woven in Anatolia by the Yörüks, a Turkish ethnic subgroup.

Yürük rugs have a long, shaggy pile, tied with Ghiordes knots. The warp and the filler (the weft between the knots) is generally composed of sheep's wool or goat hair. The rugs have large geometric motifs in bright colours on a dark brown background; the colours are often described as brilliant. The sides of the rugs are either selvaged, frequently with goat hair, or overcast with coloured yarn, and the ends have a braided fringe.

The design of Yürük rugs resembles that of rugs from the Kazak region more than that of Anatolia. The use of a latch hook is also shared with Kazak rugs. Yürük rugs tend to be more loosely woven than other rugs from Anatolia, in that there are more rows of filler between the knots.

According to the Encyclopaedia Britannica, there is a distinction between Yürük rugs from eastern and western Anatolia. The rugs from western Anatolia traditionally have diagonal patterns in brick red and dark blue, and highlights in ivory. These rugs are sometimes confused with Baluchi rugs, a type of Afghan rug. Eastern Anatolian Yürük rugs have hexagonal and lozenge patterns with offset knots that produce diagonal rather than vertical rows.
