= Değirmenözü, Manavgat =

Değirmenözü
- Neighbourhood
- Location in Turkey
- Coordinates: 37.3867°N 31.2206°E
- Country: Turkey
- Province: Antalya
- District: Manavgat
- Population (2022): 255
- Time zone: UTC+3 (TRT)

Değirmenözü is a neighbourhood in the municipality and district of Manavgat, Antalya Province, Turkey. Its population is 255 (2022).
