= Yeşilbağ, Manavgat =

Yeşilbağ
- Neighbourhood
- Location in Turkey
- Coordinates: 37.4067°N 31.2411°E
- Country: Turkey
- Province: Antalya
- District: Manavgat
- Population (2022): 461
- Time zone: UTC+3 (TRT)

Yeşilbağ is a neighbourhood in the municipality and district of Manavgat, Antalya Province, Turkey. Its population is 461 (2022).
