= Xocalı, Salyan =

Xocalı
- Municipality
- Location within Azerbaijan
- Coordinates: 39°32′N 49°01′E
- Country: Azerbaijan
- Rayon: Salyan

Population
  - Total: 365
- Time zone: UTC+4 (AZT)
  - Summer (DST): UTC+5 (AZT)

Xocalı (also, Khodzhaly, Khadzhaly, and Khodzhallar) is a village and municipality in the Salyan Rayon of Azerbaijan. It has a population of 365.
