= Çaltepe, Manavgat =

Çaltepe
- Neighbourhood
- Location in Turkey
- Coordinates: 37°18′25″N 31°11′02″E
- Country: Turkey
- Province: Antalya
- District: Manavgat
- Population (2022): 347
- Time zone: UTC+3 (TRT)

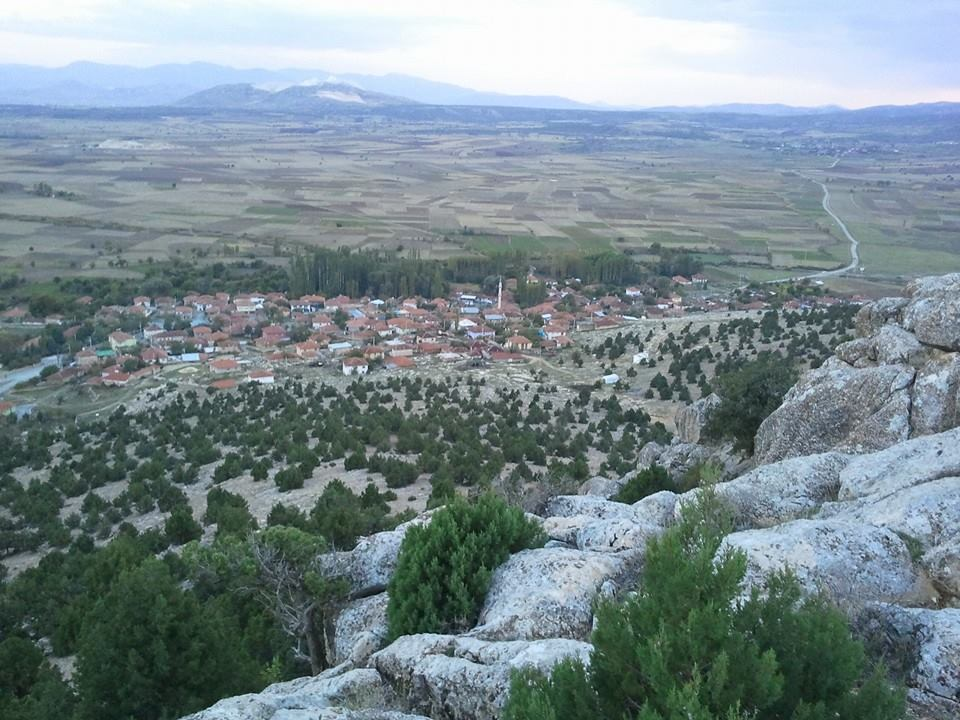
çaltepe köyü

Çaltepe is a neighbourhood in the municipality and district of Manavgat, Antalya Province, Turkey. Its population is 347 (2022).
