= Manavand, Darmian =

Manavand مناوند
- Village
- Location within Iran
- Coordinates: 33°16′08″N 59°41′11″E
- Country: Iran
- Province: South Khorasan
- County: Darmian
- Bakhsh: Qohestan
- Rural District: Qohestan

Population (2006)
  - Total: 123
- Time zone: UTC+3:30 (IRST)
  - Summer (DST): UTC+4:30 (IRDT)

Manavand (Persian: مناوند, also Romanized as Manāvand; also known as Manāvan) is a village in Qohestan Rural District, Qohestan District, Darmian County, South Khorasan Province, Iran. At the 2006 census, its population was 123, in 43 families.
