= Hocalı, Manavgat =

Hocalı
- Neighbourhood
- Location in Turkey
- Coordinates: 36°48′45″N 31°36′34″E
- Country: Turkey
- Province: Antalya
- District: Manavgat
- Population (2022): 324
- Time zone: UTC+3 (TRT)

Hocalı is a neighbourhood in the municipality and district of Manavgat, Antalya Province, Turkey. Its population is 324 (2022).
