= Yörüks =

Turkish semi-nomadic ethnic subgroup

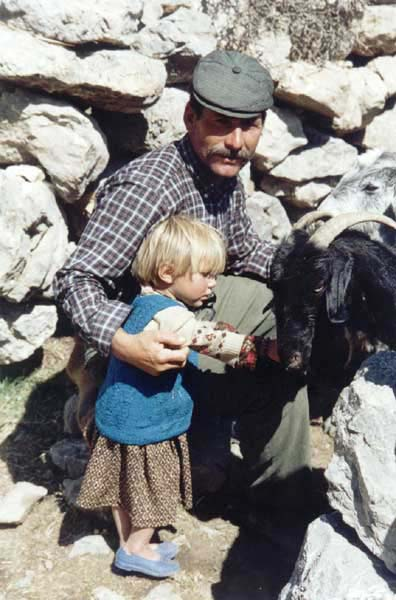
- A Yörük father with his daughter in Antalya (2009)

Regions with significant populations
- Anatolia, Balkans
- Turkey: >1,000,000 (1970)
- North Macedonia: 4,000
- Bulgaria: 1,000

Languages
- Turkish

Religion
- Islam (Sunni, Alevi)

Related ethnic groups
- Turkish people and other Turkic peoples

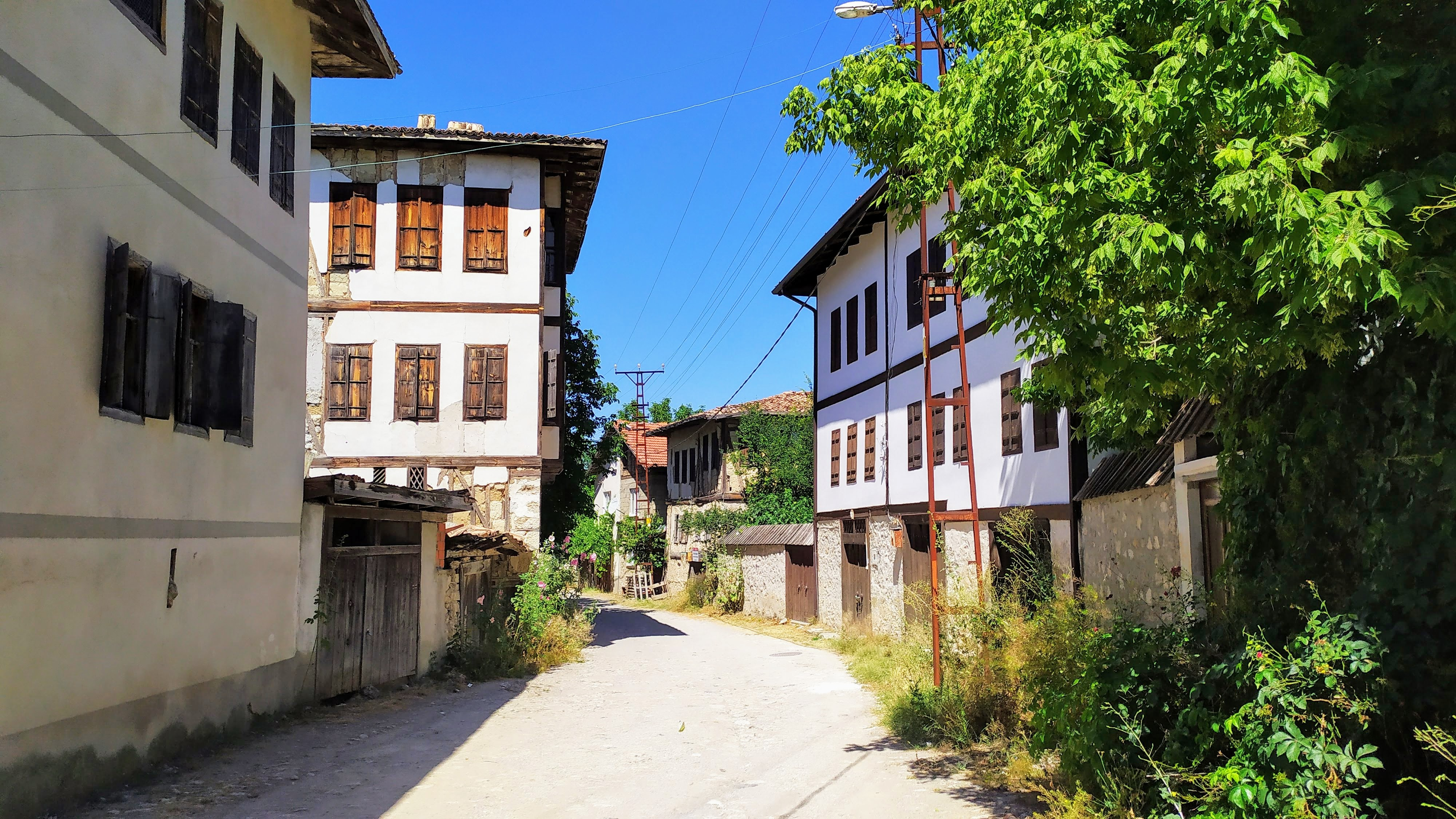
A Yörük village settled in 15th century, traditional Turkish houses

The Yörüks, also Yuruks or Yorouks (Turkish: Yörükler; Greek: Γιουρούκοι, Youroúkoi; Bulgarian: юруци; Macedonian: Јуруци, Juruci), are a Turkish ethnic subgroup of Oghuz descent, some of whom are nomadic, primarily inhabiting the mountains of Anatolia, and partly in the Balkan peninsula. On the Balkans Yörüks are distributed over a wide area from the eastern parts of North Macedonia, parts of Bulgaria, north to Larissa in Thessaly and southern Thrace in Greece. Their name derives from the Old Turkish verb "yörü", meaning "to walk", and they are also called Yörük or Yürük. The contractions o > u and ö > ü in the first syllable in Rumelian dialects are typical, and while they are called Yörük in Anatolia, the Yürük form is used in Rumelia. These contractions are due to the Kipchak Turkic influence on dialects of Turkish. The Yörüks were under the Yörük Sanjak, (Turkish: Yörük Sancağı) which was not a territorial unit like the other sanjaks, but a separate organisational unit of the Ottoman Empire.

According to some, those tribes residing in the east of the Kızılırmak river are called Turkmen and those in the west Yörük. Both terms were used together in Ottoman sources for Dulkadirli Turkmens living in Maraş and its surroundings. The ethnohistorical terms Turcoman and Turkmen are used synonymously in literature to designate Yörük ancestry.

== Origin of Yörüks ==
In the medieval era, to distinguish their own loyal Sunni Turkomans from the Shah-loyal Shiite Kızılbaş Turkomans of eastern Anatolia and Azerbaijan, Ottoman governors coined the blanket term Yörük (or Yürük), meaning "nomad" or "wanderer." This served as a political demarcation between western (Ottoman Turkic) and eastern (Persian-influenced) Turkoman groups.

Despite being politically divided between the Ottoman Turks and the Persian-influenced eastern realms, Eastern and Western Turkomans were ethnically and linguistically the same, differing only in minor dialectal or cultural aspects.

== Anatolia ==
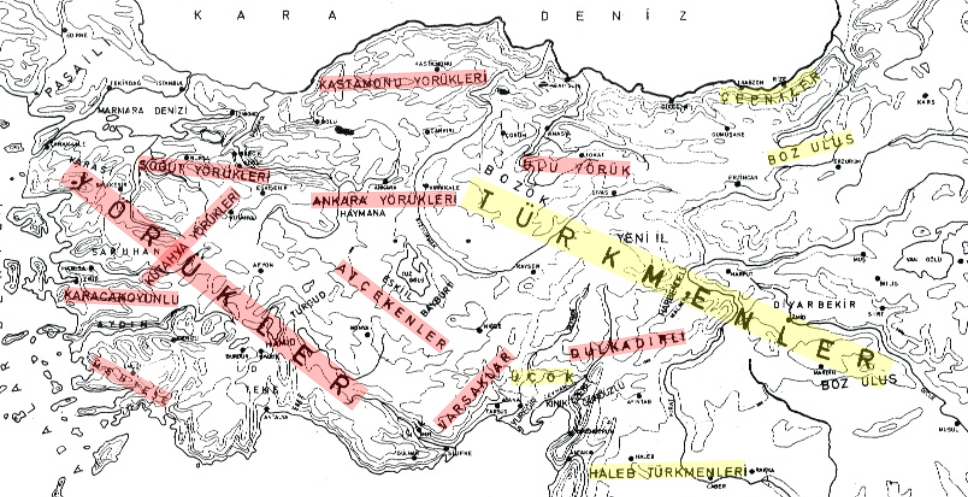
Yörük (red) and Turkmens (yellow) in Anatolia

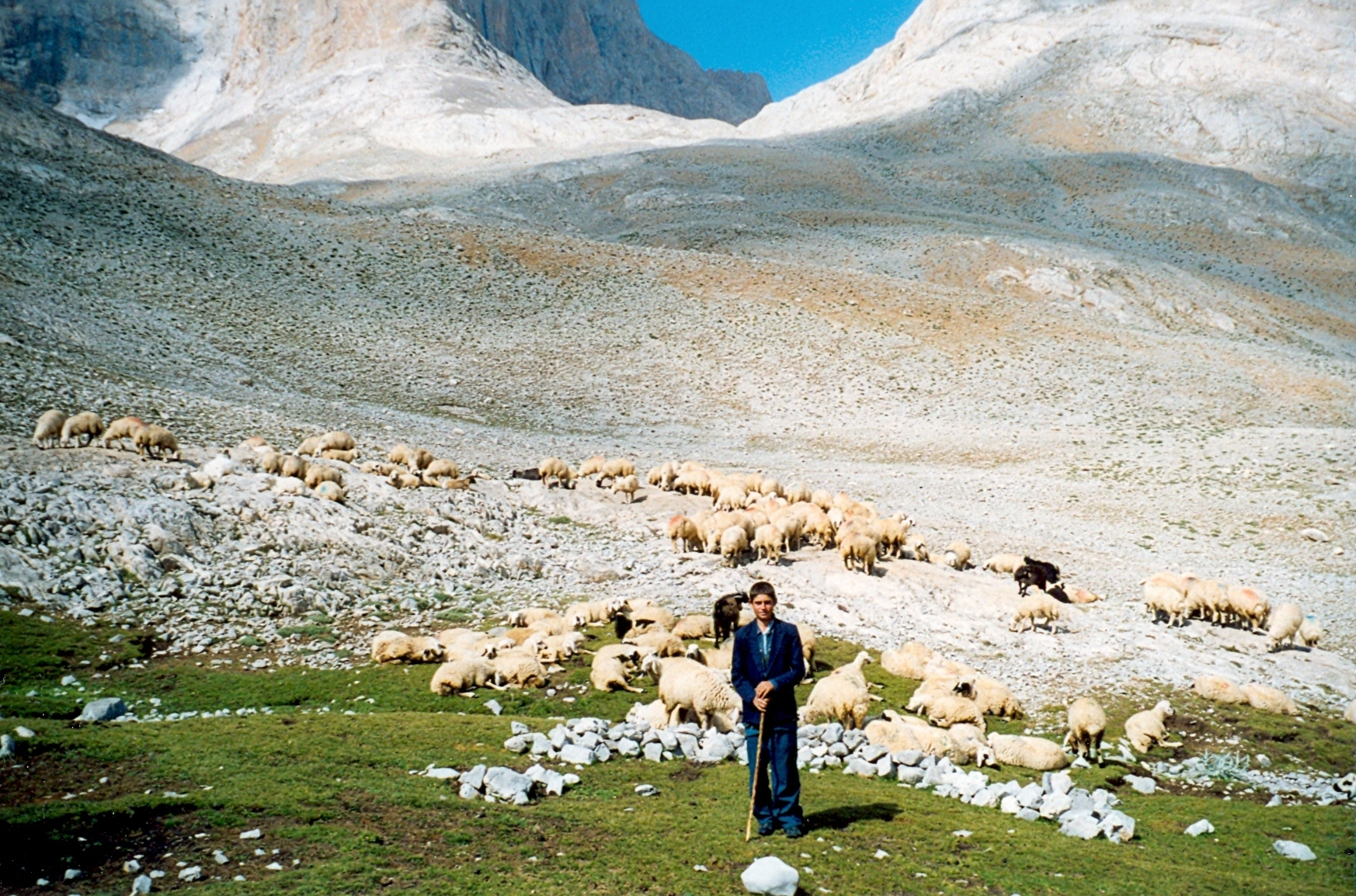
Yörük shepherd in the Taurus Mountains in 2002.

Historians and ethnologists often use the additional appellative 'Yörük Turcoman' or 'Turkmens' to describe the Yörüks of Anatolia. In Turkey's general parlance today, the terms "Türkmen" and "Yörük" indicate the gradual degrees of preserved attachment with the former semi-nomadic lifestyle of the populations concerned, with the "Turkmen" now leading a fully sedentary life, while keeping parts of their heritage through folklore and traditions, in arts like carpet-weaving, with the continued habit of keeping a yayla house for the summers, sometimes in relation to the Alevi community etc. and with Yörüks maintaining a stronger association with nomadism. These names ultimately hint at their Oghuz Turkish roots. The remaining "true" Yörüks of today's Anatolia traditionally use horses as a means of transportation, though these are steadily being replaced by trucks.

The Yörüks are divided in a large number of named endogamous patrilineal tribes (aşiret). Among recent tribes mentioned in the literature are Aksigirli, Ali Efendi, Bahsıs, Cakallar, Coşlu, Qekli, Gacar, Güzelbeyli, Horzum, Karaevli, Karahacılı, Karakoyunlu, Karakayalı, Karalar, Karakeçili, Manavlı, Melemenci, San Agalı, Sanhacılı, Sarıkeçili, Tekeli and Yeni Osmanlı. The tribes are splintered in clans or lineages, i.e. kabile, sülale or oba.

- Anatolian Yörüks: Mersin Yörüks, Alaiye Yörüks, Tekeli Yörüks, Bursa Yörüks, Haruniye Yörüks, Maraş Yörüks, Ankara Yörüks, Eğridir Yörüks, Araç Yörüks, Taraklı Yörüks, Murtana Yörüks, Nacaklı Yörüks, Nasırlı Yörüks, Eski Yörüks, Toraman Yörük, Tacirleri Yörüks, Tor Yörüks.

=== Sarıkeçili Yörüks ===
The Sarıkeçili or "Yellow Goats" are the last Yörüks maintaining the nomadic way of life. They mainly live in Mersin Province in the central-eastern parts of the Turkish Mediterranean coast and consist of about 200 families. Their winter camps are in the coasts of Silifke, Gülnar and Anamur. In summer they live in the districts of Beyşehir and Seydişehir in Konya Province. Their nomad tents can be seen throughout the Mediterranean coastal sides of Turkey. This is a very common practice among old Turkic tribes in central Asia even nowadays. A throat singing tradition, known as “Boğaz Havası” or “Boğaz Çalma”, has an important aspect in the culture of the Sarıkeçili Yörüks, it is performed by pressing the throat with a finger while singing with a sound.

In the past centuries, many Sarıkeçili tribes also resided in these areas: İçil (today Mersin), Aydın, Konya, Afyonkarahisar, Akşehir, Saruhan, Doğanhisarı, Antalya, Lake Eğirdir, Isparta, Burdur, Dazkırı, Uluborlu. Most Sarıkeçili tribes living in these areas have already accepted the sedentary way of life. The Sarıkeçili around Antalya and Mersin are the last representatives of Yörük nomadism.

=== Manavlı Yörüks ===
Manavlı tribe or Manavlı Yörüks is a Yörük tribe living in Antalya, Adana, Aydın, Manisa and the Taurus Mountains. The Manavlı tribe appears in Ottoman records as "Manavlı, Manavlu, Manavlar Perakendesi." Their settlements are listed as İçil, Saruhan, and Alaiye Sanjaks. It is believed that the Manavlı Yörüks took their name from the fact that they lived in old times near the town of Manava, a Byzantine settlement now lost and located near the modern Manavgat. There is also the Manavlı Goat of the Yörüks.

=== Lifestyle ===
French historian and Turkologist Jean-Paul Roux visited the Anatolian Yörüks in the late 1950s and found that the majority of them were practicing Sunni Muslims. The tribes he visited were led by elected officials called muhtars, or village headmen, rather than hereditary chiefs, although he did note that village elders maintained some social authority based on their age. For the majority of the year, they lived in dark wool tents called kara çadır. During the summer, they went up to the mountains, and in the winter they came down to the coastal plains. They kept a variety of animals, including goats, sheep, camels, and sometimes cattle.

The focus of each tribe was the family unit. Young men would move directly from their family's tent to their own upon marriage. The Yörüks married endogamously; that is, they married strictly within their own tribe. Children were raised by the tribe as a whole, who told Roux "we are all parents." Although the Yörüks had acquired a reputation for being deliberately resistant to formal education, Roux found that a full quarter of Yörük children he encountered were attending school, despite the difficulties of living a nomadic lifestyle in remote locations with limited access.

== Balkans ==
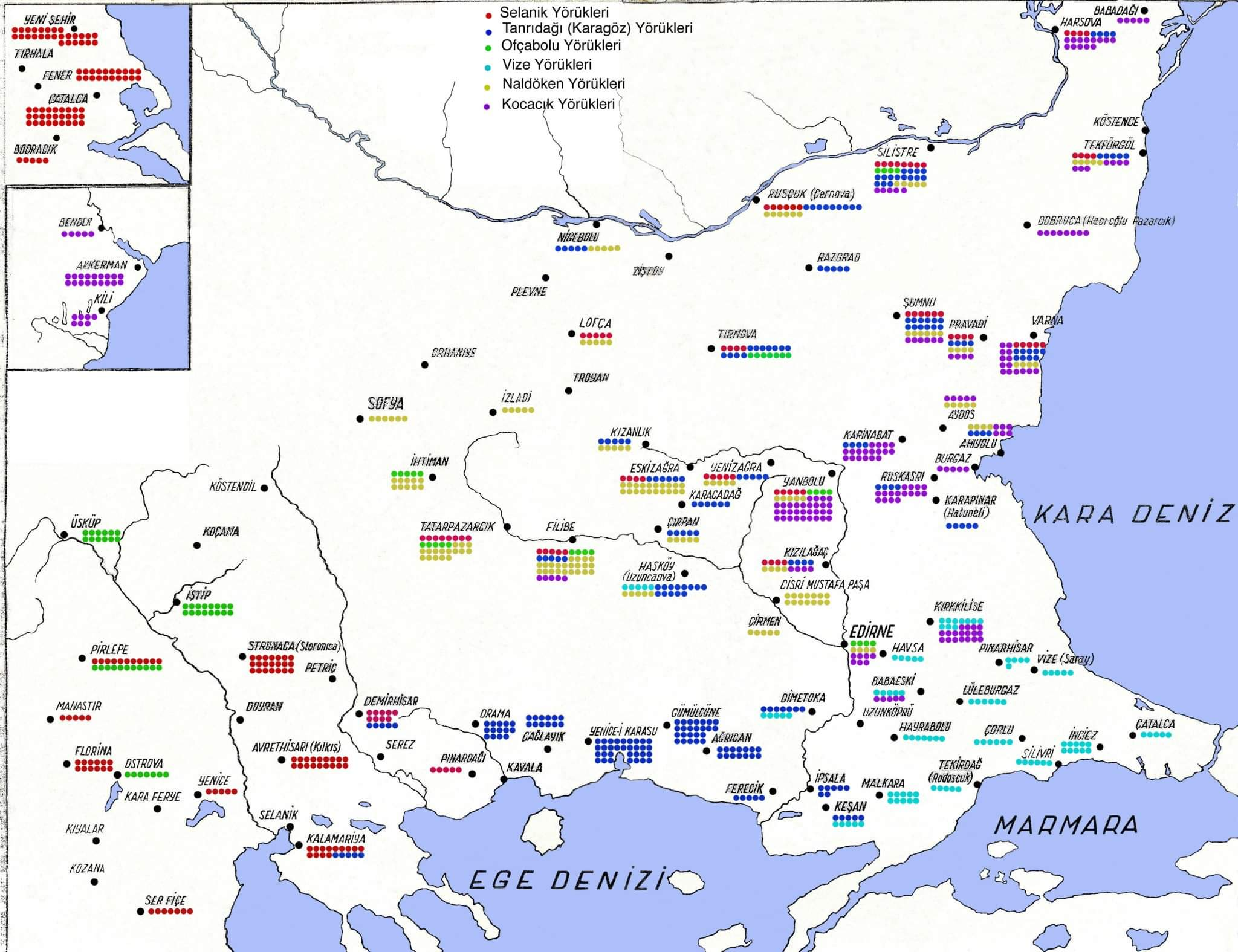
Balkan Yörük settlements

In 1911, the Yörük were a distinct segment of the population of Macedonia and Thrace, where they settled as early as the 14th century. An earlier offshoot of the Yörüks, the Kailar or Kayılar Turks, were among the first settlements in Europe.

- Rumelian Yörüks: Atçekenler/Tanrıdağı Yörüks, Naldöken Yörüks, Kocacık Yörüks, Ofcabolu Yörüks, Vize Yörüks, Yanbolu Yörüks, Selanik Yörüks. Tekirdağ Yürüks.

In 1900 the Rumelian Turkish population in the Balkans was estimated at seven million. Shortly after the independence of the new Bulgarian state, they formed a significant minority in the country. Several waves of migration led to a decline of the Rumelian Turkish population, leaving about 1.5 million people by 1925. Many Rumelian Turks in Greece are not counted in census because they are registered as Christians to escape discrimination. Due to religious, linguistic and social differences, most Rumelian Turks did not intermarry or mix with the native populations of the Balkans.

As late as 1971, Rumelian Turks still formed a distinct ethnos of former nomads (known as Yorukluk). Originally, these Yörük nomads were taken from West Anatolia (Saruhan, Menemen) to colonize parts of Rumelia, such as Thessaly and Rhodope in the Greek-Bulgarian-Macedonian borderland, or Plovdiv and Yambol in Bulgaria.

In 1993, the Yörük population of Bulgaria is estimated at approx. 418 thousand people, mainly divided into Surguch (7000 without children) and Yörük (320,000 without children). They live mainly in the European part of Turkey, in Dulovo and the Deliorman area in Bulgaria and in the Kumanovo and Bitola areas of North Macedonia. Dialects include Gajal, Gerlovo Turk, Karamanli, Kyzylbash, Surguch, Tozluk Turk, Yuruk (Konyar, Yoruk), Prizren and Macedonian Gagauz. Current estimates of 2019 assume that in the entire Balkan region approx. 1.5 to 2.3 million people of Yörük Turkish descent live.

=== Kayılar Yörüks ===
The Kailar Turks formerly inhabited parts of Thessaly and Macedonia (especially near the town of Kozani and modern Ptolemaida). Before 1360, large numbers of nomad shepherds, or Yörüks, from the district of Konya, in Asia Minor, had settled in the country. Further immigration from this region took place from time to time up to the middle of the 18th century. After the establishment of the feudal system in 1397 many of the Seljuk noble families came over from Asia Minor; some of the beys or Muslim landowners in southern Macedonia before the Balkan Wars may have been their descendants.

== Iran ==
Clans closely related to the Yörüks are scattered throughout the Anatolian Peninsula and beyond it, particularly around the chain of Taurus Mountains and further east around the shores of the Caspian Sea. Of the Turkmens of Iran, the Yomuts come the closest to the definition of the Yörüks. An interesting offshoot of the Yörük mass are the Tahtacı of the mountainous regions of Western Anatolia who, as their name implies, have been occupied with forestry work and wood craftsmanship for centuries. Despite this, they share similar traditions (with markedly matriarchal tones in their society structure) with their other Yörük cousins. The Qashqai people of southern Iran are also worthy of mention due to their shared characteristics.

== Notable people ==
- Ferdi Tayfur (born 1945), Turkish music singer
- Alper Gezeravcı (born 1979), First Turkish astronaut
- Şerif Turgut first Turkish female war correspondent
- Bedia Akartürk (born 1941), Turkish folk music singer

== Gallery ==
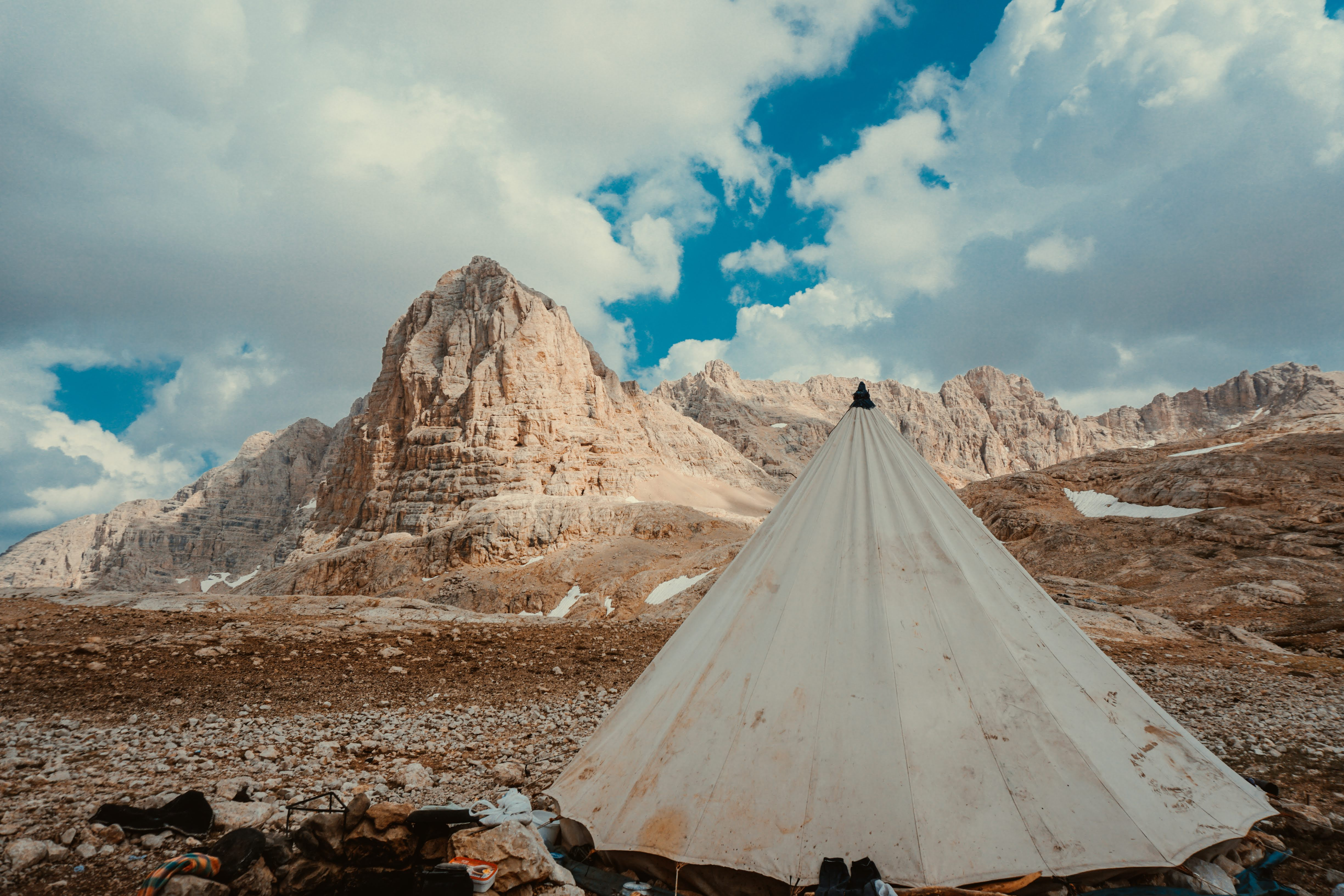
Yörük tent

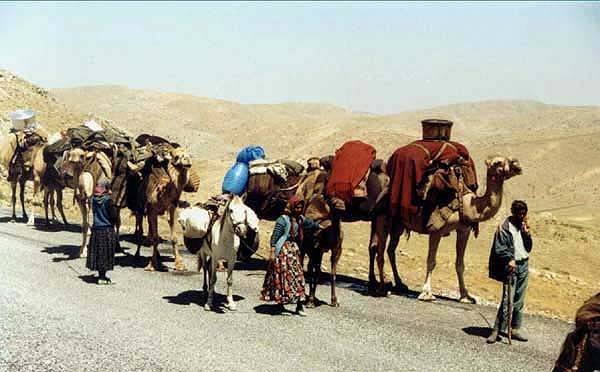
Yörük nomads

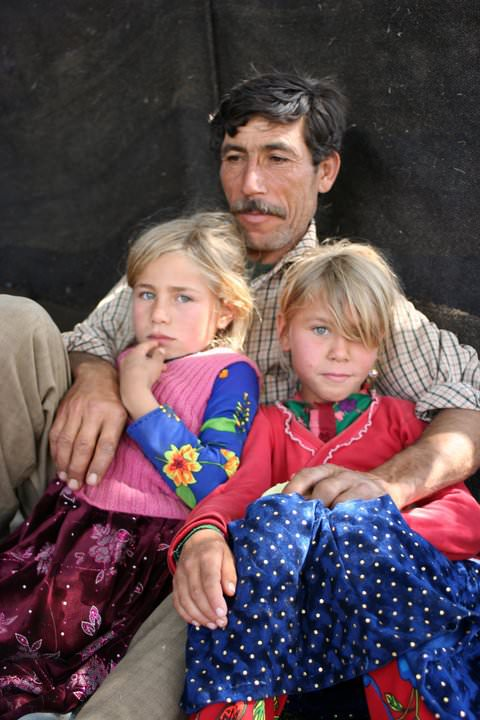
Yörük father with his daughters, central Anatolia

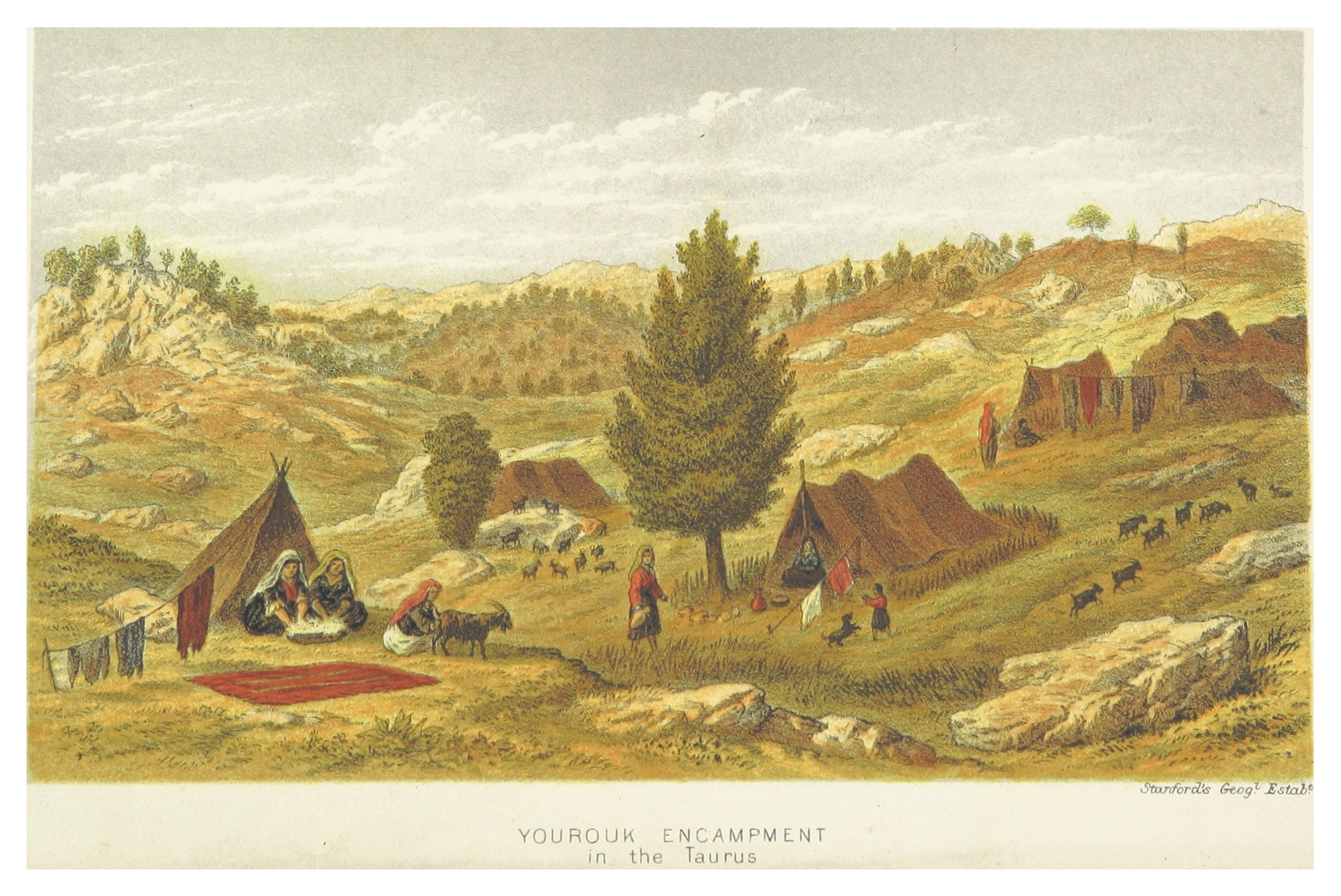
Yörük camp in the Taurus Mountains, c. 1879

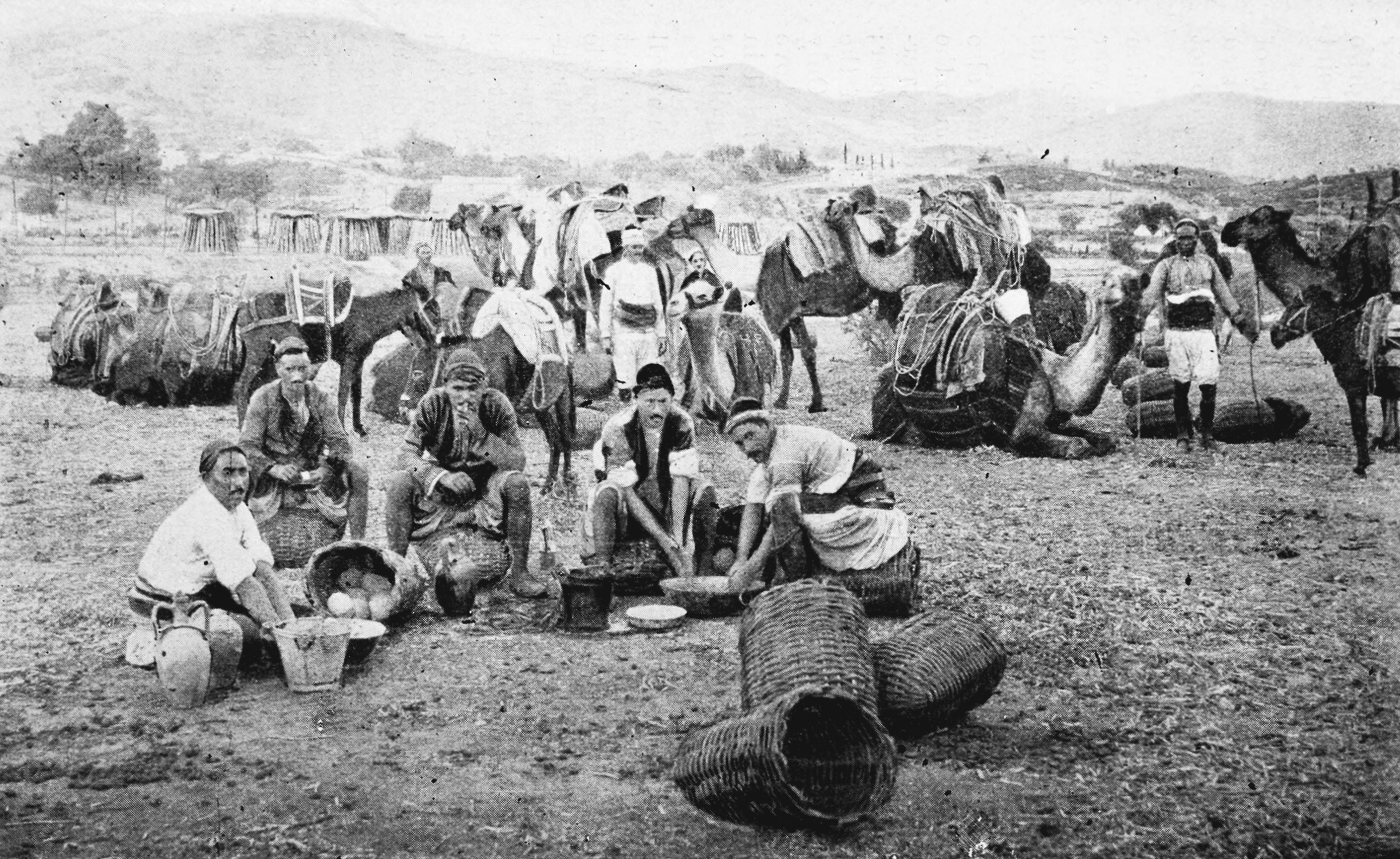
Yörük encampment, c. 1893

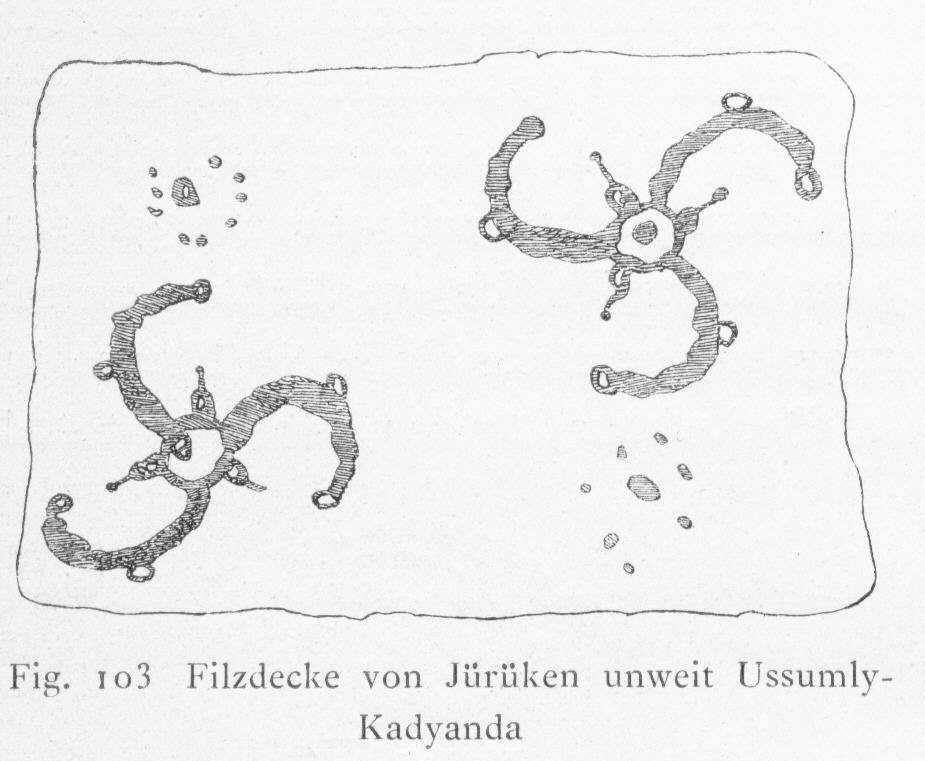
Yörük felt rug near Ussumly-Kadyanda, late 19th c.

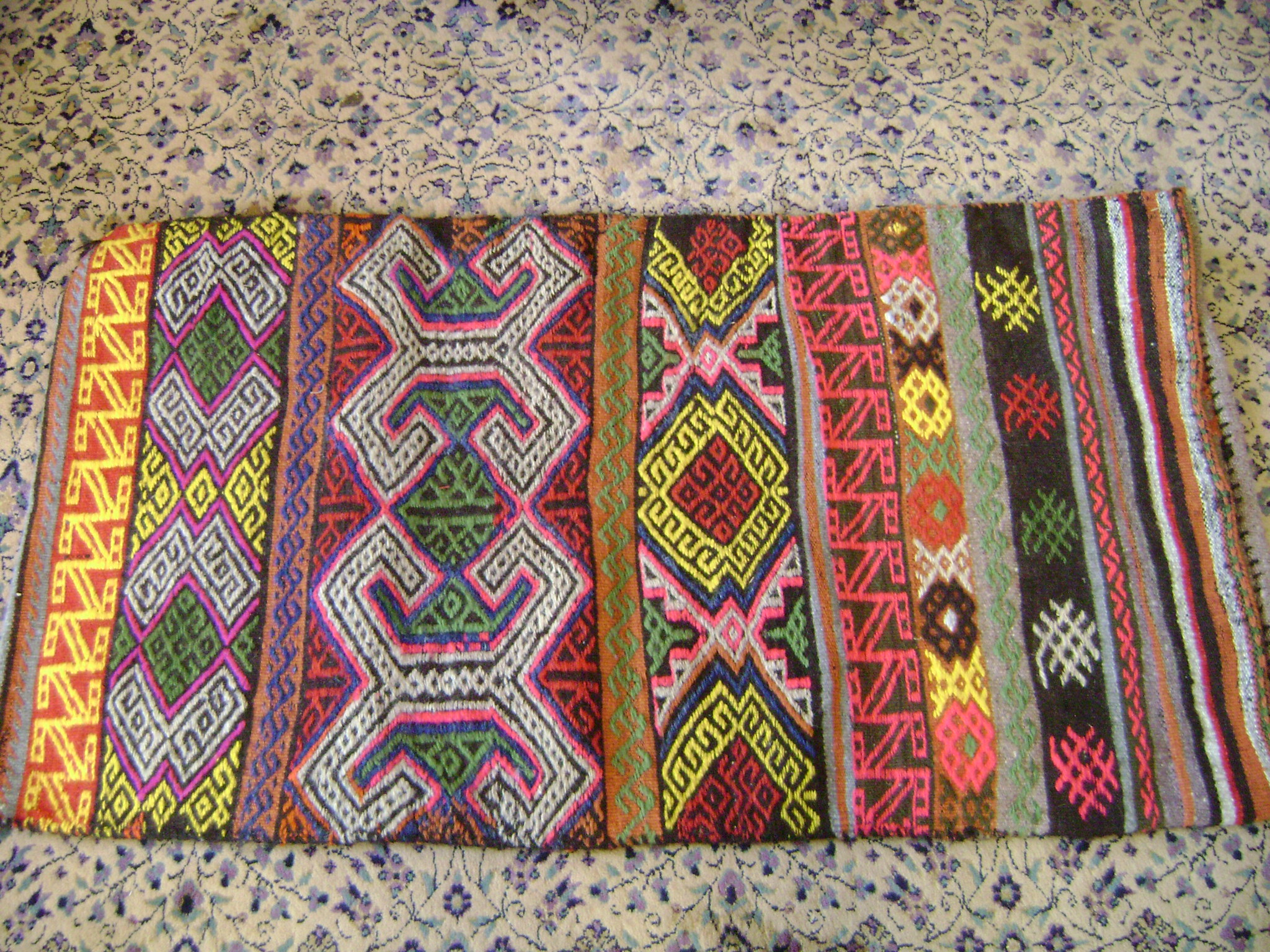
Yörük embroidery on a wheat sack

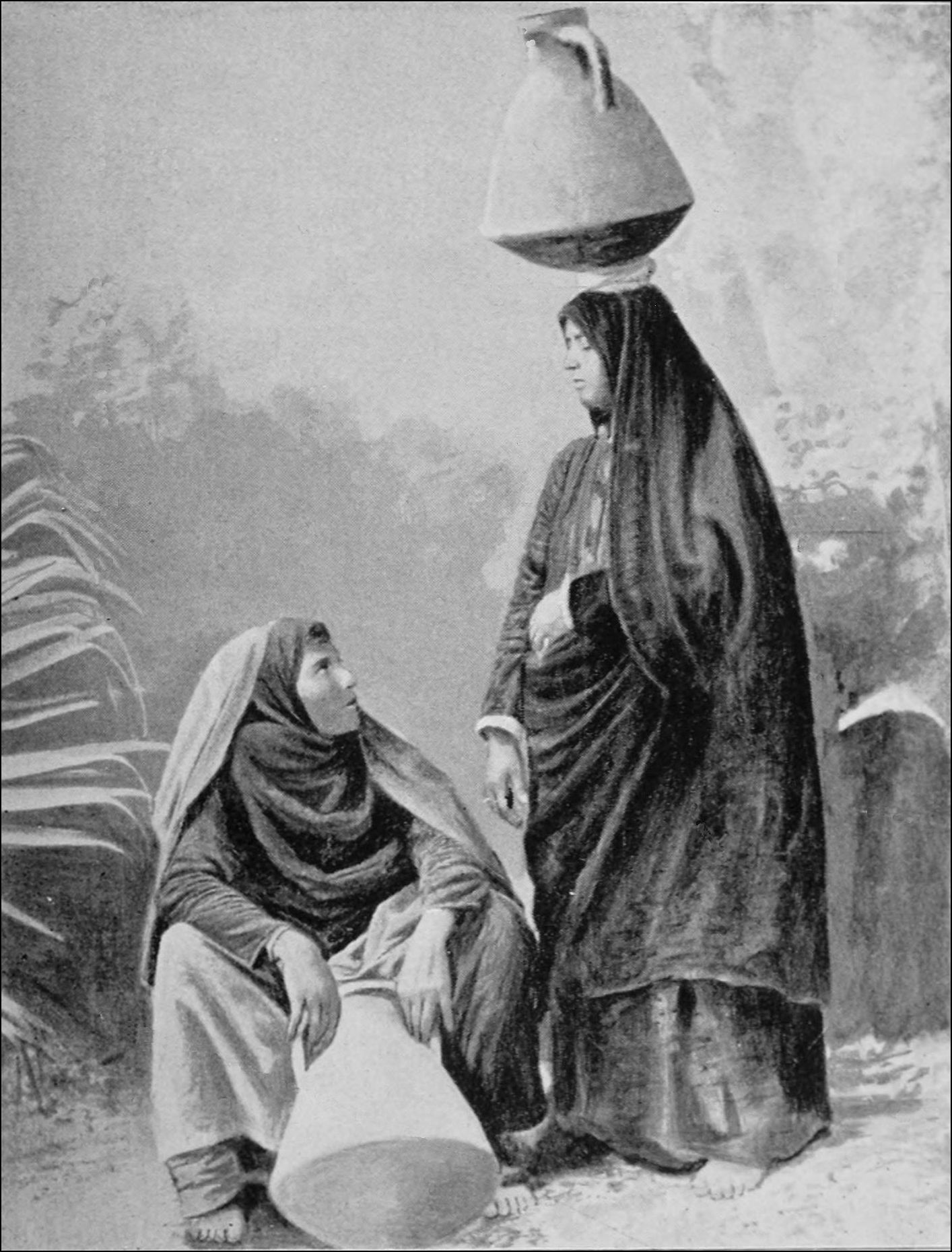
Yörük women at the spring

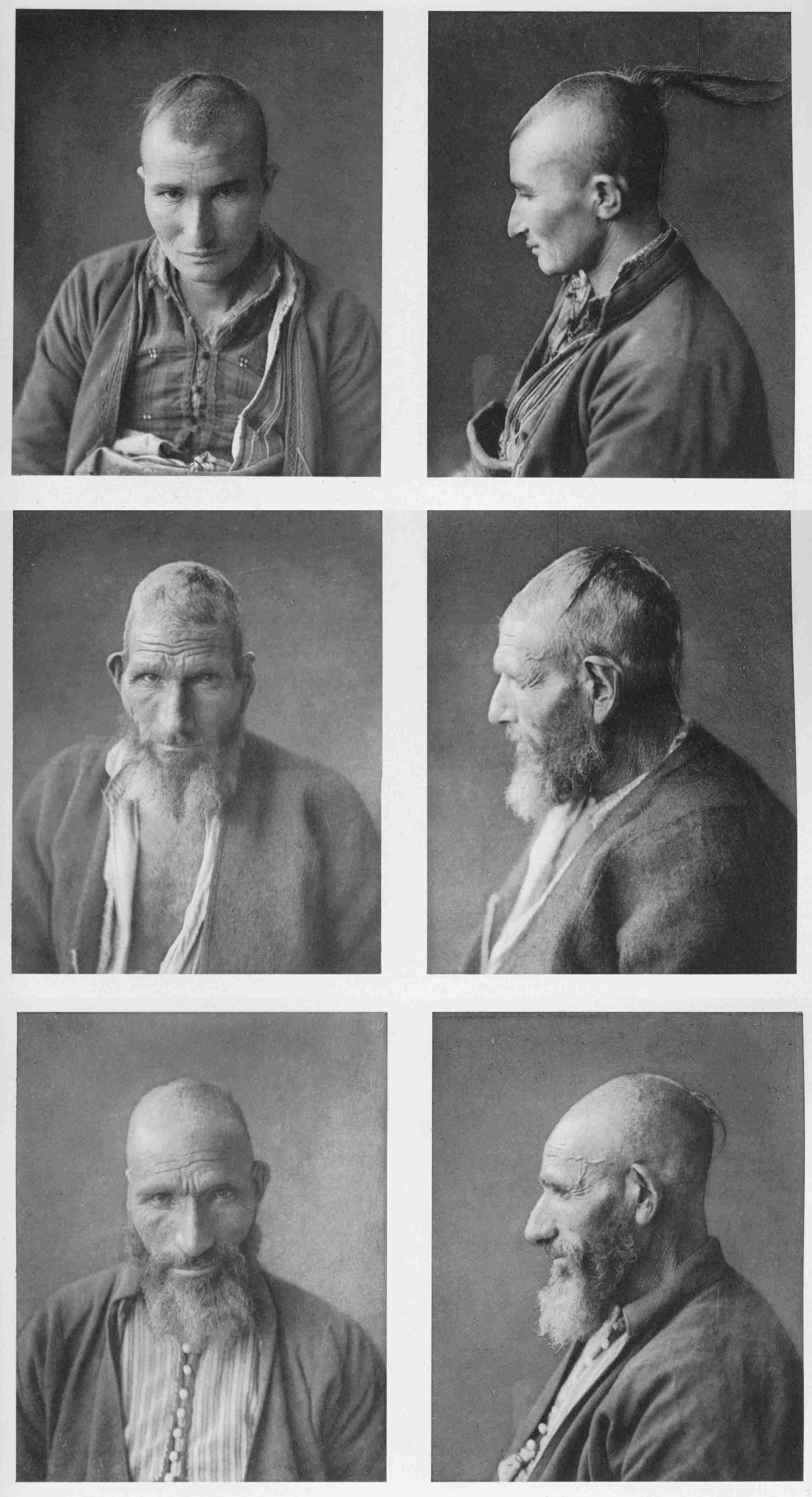
Anthropological essay on male Yörük adults (Felix von Luschan, 1889)

== See also ==
- Qashqai people
- Turkmens
- Yürük rug
- Tahtacı
