= Manava (Pamphylia) =

Town of ancient Pamphylia

Coordinates: 36°47′13″N 31°26′49″E

Manava (also rendered as Manauna, Manavva or Manaua tamnoa) was a town of ancient Pamphylia, inhabited during Byzantine times. Its site is located near Manavgat, in Asiatic Turkey.
