= List of populated places in Antalya Province =

A list of populated places in Antalya Province, Turkey by district:

== Akseki ==
- Akseki, Antalya
- Akşahap, Akseki
- Alaçeşme, Akseki
- Aşağıaşıklar, Akseki
- Bademli, Akseki
- Belenalan, Akseki
- Bucakalan, Akseki
- Bucakkışla, Akseki
- Büyükalan, Akseki
- Ceceler, Akseki
- Cemerler, Akseki
- Cendeve, Akseki
- Cevizli, Akseki
- Değirmenlik, Akseki
- Dikmen, Akseki
- Dutluca, Akseki
- Emiraşıklar, Akseki
- Erenyaka, Akseki
- Geriş, Akseki
- Geriş-bucak merkezi, Akseki
- Gümüşdamla, Akseki
- Güneykaya, Akseki
- Günyaka, Akseki
- Güzelsu, Akseki
- Güçlüköy, Akseki
- Hocaköy, Akseki
- Hüsamettinköy, Akseki
- Karakışla, Akseki
- Kepez, Akseki
- Kepezbeleni, Akseki
- Kuyucak, Akseki
- Mahmutlu, Akseki
- Menteşbey, Akseki
- Minareli, Akseki
- Pınarbaşı, Akseki
- Sadıklar, Akseki
- Salihler, Akseki
- Sarıhacılar, Akseki
- Sarıhaliller, Akseki
- Sinanhoca, Akseki
- Susuzşahap, Akseki
- Süleymaniye, Akseki
- Taşlıca, Akseki
- Yarpuz, Akseki
- Çaltılıçukur, Akseki
- Çanakpınar, Akseki
- Çimiköy, Akseki
- Çukurköy, Akseki
- Çınardibi, Akseki

== Alanya ==
- Akdam, Alanya
- Akçatı, Alanya
- Alacami, Alanya
- Alanya
- Aliefendi, Alanya
- Asmaca, Alanya
- Avsallar, Alanya
- Bademağacı, Alanya
- Basırlı, Alanya
- Bayır, Alanya
- BayırKöy, Alanya
- Bayırkozağacı, Alanya
- Başköy, Alanya
- Beldibi, Alanya
- Beyreli, Alanya
- Bucakköy, Alanya
- Burçaklar, Alanya
- Büyükpınar, Alanya
- Bıçakçı, Alanya
- Cikcilli, Alanya
- Demirtaş, Alanya
- Dereköy, Alanya
- Deretürbelinas, Alanya
- Değirmendere, Alanya
- Elikesik, Alanya
- Emişbeleni, Alanya
- Esentepe, Alanya
- Fakırcalı, Alanya
- Gözübüyük, Alanya
- Gözüküçüklü, Alanya
- Gümüşgöze, Alanya
- Gümüşkavak, Alanya
- Güneyköy, Alanya
- Güzelbağ, Alanya
- Hacıkerimler, Alanya
- Hacımehmetli, Alanya
- Hocalar, Alanya
- Karakocalı, Alanya
- Karamanlar, Alanya
- Karapınar, Alanya
- Kargıcak, Alanya
- Kayabaşı, Alanya
- Kestel, Alanya
- Keşefli, Alanya
- Kocaoğlanlı, Alanya
- Konaklı, Alanya
- Kuzyaka, Alanya
- Kızılcaşehir, Alanya
- Mahmutlar, Alanya
- Mahmutseydi, Alanya
- Oba, Alanya
- Obaalacami, Alanya
- Payallar, Alanya
- Paşaköy, Alanya
- Saburlar, Alanya
- Sapadere, Alanya
- Seki, Alanya
- Soğukpınar, Alanya
- Süleymanlar, Alanya
- Taşbaşı, Alanya
- Toslak, Alanya
- Tosmur, Alanya
- Türkler, Alanya
- Türktaş, Alanya
- Tırılar, Alanya
- Ulugüney, Alanya
- Uzunöz, Alanya
- Uğrak, Alanya
- Uğurlu, Alanya
- Yalçı, Alanya
- Yaylakonak, Alanya
- Yaylalı, Alanya
- Yenice, Alanya
- YeniceKöyü, Alanya
- Yeniköy, Alanya
- Yeşilöz, Alanya
- Çakallar, Alanya
- Çamlıca, Alanya
- Çıplaklı, Alanya
- Öteköy, Alanya
- Özvadi, Alanya
- Üzümü, Alanya
- İmamlı, Alanya
- İncekum, Alanya
- İshaklı, Alanya
- İspatlı, Alanya
- Şıhlar, Alanya

== Antalya ==
- Akdamlar, Konyaaltı
- Akkoç, Döşemealtı
- Aksu, Antalya
- Alaylı, Antalya
- Antalya
- Aşağıkaraman, Konyaaltı
- Aşağıoba, Döşemealtı
- Bademağacı, Antalya
- Bahtılı, Konyaaltı
- Başköy, Antalya
- Bıyıklı, Döşemealtı
- Camili, Döşemealtı
- Dereli, Döşemealtı
- Duacı, Antalya
- Dumanlar, Antalya
- Fettahlı, Antalya
- Gaziler, Antalya
- Geyikbayırı, Konyaaltı
- Gökdere, Antalya
- Göloluk, Antalya
- Hacısekiler, Antalya
- Hisarçandır, Konyaaltı
- Ilıcaköy, Antalya
- Karataş, Döşemealtı
- Karatepe, Antalya
- Karaçallı, Antalya
- Kayadibi, Antalya
- Kemerağzı, Antalya
- Kevşirler, Döşemealtı
- Killik, Döşemealtı
- Kirişçiler, Antalya
- Kovanlık, Döşemealtı
- Kurşunlu, Antalya
- Kömürcüler, Döşemealtı
- Kızıllı, Antalya
- Odabaşı, Antalya
- Selimiye, Döşemealtı
- Solakköy, Antalya
- Topallı, Antalya
- Varsak, Antalya
- Yarbaşıçandırı, Konyaaltı
- Yağca, Döşemealtı
- Yenidumanlar, Antalya
- Yeşilkaraman, Antalya
- Çamlıca, Antalya
- Çağlarca, Konyaaltı
- Çitdibi, Antalya
- Çıplaklı, Antalya
- Özlü, Antalya
- Üçoluk, Konyaaltı
- İhsaniye, Antalya

== Demre ==
- Belören, Demre
- Beymelek, Demre
- Davazlar, Demre
- Demre
- Gürses, Demre
- Kaleüçağız, Demre
- Kapaklı, Demre
- Köşkerler, Demre
- Yavu, Demre
- Çağman, Demre
- Çevreli, Demre

== Döşemealtı ==
- Ahırtaş, Döşemealtı
- Döşemealtı

== Elmalı ==
- Afşar, Elmalı
- Ahatlı, Elmalı
- Akçainiş, Elmalı
- Akçay, Elmalı
- Armutlu, Elmalı
- Bayralar, Elmalı
- Bayındır, Elmalı
- Beyler, Elmalı
- Bozhüyük, Elmalı
- Büyüksöyle, Elmalı
- Dereköy, Elmalı
- Düdenköy, Elmalı
- Elmalı, Antalya
- Eskihisar, Elmalı
- Eymir, Elmalı
- Geçitköy, Elmalı
- Geçmen, Elmalı
- Gökpınar, Elmalı
- Gölova, Elmalı
- Göltarla, Elmalı
- Gümüşyaka, Elmalı
- Hacımusalar, Elmalı
- Hacıyusuflar, Elmalı
- Imırcık, Elmalı
- Karaköy, Elmalı
- Karamık, Elmalı
- Kocapınar, Elmalı
- Kuzköy, Elmalı
- Kuzuköy, Elmalı
- Küçüksöyle, Elmalı
- Küçüksöğle, Elmalı
- Kızılca, Elmalı
- Kışlaköy, Elmalı
- Macun, Elmalı
- Mursal, Elmalı
- Müren, Elmalı
- Ovacık, Elmalı
- Pirhasanlar, Elmalı
- Salur, Elmalı
- Sarılar, Elmalı
- Tavullar, Elmalı
- Tekkeköy, Elmalı
- Yakaçiftlikköyü, Elmalı
- Yanlızdam, Elmalı
- Yapraklı, Elmalı
- Yörenler, Elmalı
- Yılmazlı, Elmalı
- Zümrütova, Elmalı
- Çaybaşı, Elmalı
- Çobanisa, Elmalı
- Çukurelma, Elmalı
- Özdemir, Elmalı
- İmircik, Elmalı
- İslamlar, Elmalı

== Finike ==
- Akçaalan, Finike
- Alacadağ, Finike
- Arifköy, Finike
- Asarönü, Finike
- Boldağ, Finike
- Dağbağ, Finike
- Finike
- Gökbük, Finike
- Gökçeyaka, Finike
- Günçalı, Finike
- Hasyurt, Finike
- Yanlız, Finike
- Yazır, Finike
- Yeşilköy, Finike
- Yuvalılar, Finike
- Çamlıbel, Finike

== Gazipaşa ==
- Akoluk, Gazipaşa
- Aydıncık, Gazipaşa
- Beyobası, Gazipaşa
- Beyrebucak, Gazipaşa
- Doğanca, Gazipaşa
- Esenpınar, Gazipaşa
- Gazipaşa
- Gökçebelen, Gazipaşa
- Gökçesaray, Gazipaşa
- Göçük, Gazipaşa
- Güneyköy, Gazipaşa
- Gürçam, Gazipaşa
- Hasdere, Gazipaşa
- Ilıcaköy, Gazipaşa
- Kahyalar, Gazipaşa
- Karalar, Gazipaşa
- Karatepe, Gazipaşa
- Karaçukur, Gazipaşa
- Korubaşı, Gazipaşa
- Küçüklü, Gazipaşa
- Kırahmetler, Gazipaşa
- Kızılgüney, Gazipaşa
- Macarköy, Gazipaşa
- Muzkent, Gazipaşa
- Sugözü, Gazipaşa
- Yakacık, Gazipaşa
- Yenigüney, Gazipaşa
- Yeniköy, Gazipaşa
- Yeşilyurt, Gazipaşa
- Zeytinada, Gazipaşa
- Çakmak, Gazipaşa
- Çalıpınar, Gazipaşa
- Çamlıca, Gazipaşa
- Çile, Gazipaşa
- Çimenbağı, Gazipaşa
- Çobanlar, Gazipaşa
- Çörüş, Gazipaşa
- Çığlık, Gazipaşa
- Öznurtepe, Gazipaşa
- Üçkonak, Gazipaşa
- İnalköy, Gazipaşa
- İnceğiz, Gazipaşa
- Şahinler, Gazipaşa

== Gündoğmuş ==
- Akyarı, Gündoğmuş
- Balkaya, Gündoğmuş
- Bayırkozağacı, Gündoğmuş
- Bayırköy, Gündoğmuş
- Beden, Gündoğmuş
- Burçaklar, Gündoğmuş
- Eskibağ, Gündoğmuş
- Gözübüyük, Gündoğmuş
- Gümüşgöze, Gündoğmuş
- Gündoğmuş, Antalya
- Güneycik, Gündoğmuş
- Güneyköy, Gündoğmuş
- Güneyyaka, Gündoğmuş
- Kalecik, Gündoğmuş
- Karabul, Gündoğmuş
- Karadere, Gündoğmuş
- Karaisa, Gündoğmuş
- Karaköy, Gündoğmuş
- Karamanlar, Gündoğmuş
- Kayabükü, Gündoğmuş
- Kozağacı, Gündoğmuş
- Köprülü, Gündoğmuş
- Narağacı, Gündoğmuş
- Orhanköy, Gündoğmuş
- Ortakonuş, Gündoğmuş
- Ortaköy, Gündoğmuş
- Pembelik, Gündoğmuş
- Senir, Gündoğmuş
- Serinyaka, Gündoğmuş
- Umutlu, Gündoğmuş
- Yenice, Gündoğmuş
- Yeniköy, Gündoğmuş
- Çaltı, Gündoğmuş
- Çamlıalan, Gündoğmuş
- Çayırözü, Gündoğmuş
- Çiçekoluk, Gündoğmuş

== Kaş ==
- Agullu, Kaş
- Ahatlı, Kaş
- Aklar, Kaş
- Akörü, Kaş
- Bayındır, Kaş
- Beldibi, Kaş
- Belenli, Kaş
- Belkonak, Kaş
- Bezirgan, Kaş
- Boğazcık, Kaş
- Cemre, Kaş
- Dereköy, Kaş
- Dirgenler, Kaş
- Doğantaş, Kaş
- Gelemiş, Kaş
- Gökçeyazı, Kaş
- Gökçeören, Kaş
- Gömbe, Kaş
- Gürsu, Kaş
- Hacıoğlan, Kaş
- Kalkan, Kaş
- Karadağ, Kaş
- Kasaba, Kaş
- Kaş
- Kemerköy, Kaş
- Kınık, Kaş
- Kızılağaç, Kaş
- Ortabağ, Kaş
- Ova, Kaş
- Palamutköy, Kaş
- Pınarbaşı, Kaş
- Sahilkılıçlı, Kaş
- Sarıbelen, Kaş
- Sarılar, Kaş
- Sinneli, Kaş
- Sütleğen, Kaş
- Uğrar, Kaş
- Yaylakılıçlı, Kaş
- Yaylapalamut, Kaş
- Yeniköy, Kaş
- Yeşilbarak, Kaş
- Yeşilköy, Kaş
- Yuvacık, Kaş
- Çamlıköy, Kaş
- Çamlıova, Kaş
- Çataloluk, Kaş
- Çavdır, Kaş
- Çayköy, Kaş
- Çerler, Kaş
- Çeşmeköy, Kaş
- Çukurbağ, Kaş
- Üzümlü, Kaş
- İkizce, Kaş
- İslamlar, Kaş

== Kemer ==
- Beldibi, Konyaaltı
- Beycik, Kemer
- Göynük, Kemer
- Kemer, Antalya
- Kiriş, Kemer
- Ovacık, Kemer
- Tekirova, Kemer
- Ulupınar, Kemer
- Çamyuva, Kemer
- Çıralı, Kemer

== Konyaaltı ==
- Konyaaltı

== Korkuteli ==
- Akyar, Korkuteli
- Avdan, Korkuteli
- Bahçeyaka, Korkuteli
- Bayat, Korkuteli
- Bayatbademleri, Korkuteli
- Başpınar, Korkuteli
- Beğiş, Korkuteli
- Bozova, Korkuteli
- Büyükköy, Korkuteli
- Dereköy, Korkuteli
- Esenyurt, Korkuteli
- Garipçe, Korkuteli
- Göçerler, Korkuteli
- Gümüşlü, Korkuteli
- Güzle, Korkuteli
- Karabayır, Korkuteli
- Karakuyu, Korkuteli
- Karataş, Korkuteli
- Kargalık, Korkuteli
- Kargın, Korkuteli
- Kayabaşı, Korkuteli
- Kemerağzı, Korkuteli
- Korkuteli
- Kozağacı, Korkuteli
- Köseler, Korkuteli
- Küçükköy, Korkuteli
- Küçüklü, Korkuteli
- Kırkpınar, Korkuteli
- Kızılaliler, Korkuteli
- Kızılcadağ, Korkuteli
- Leylekköyü, Korkuteli
- Mamatlar, Korkuteli
- Nebiler, Korkuteli
- Osmankalfalar, Korkuteli
- Söbüce, Korkuteli
- Söğütcük, Korkuteli
- Sülekler, Korkuteli
- Tatköy, Korkuteli
- Taşkesiği, Korkuteli
- Ulucak, Korkuteli
- Yakaköy, Korkuteli
- Yalınlıgediği, Korkuteli
- Yazır, Korkuteli
- Yelten, Korkuteli
- Yeşiloba, Korkuteli
- Yeşilyayla, Korkuteli
- Yukarıkaraman, Korkuteli
- Çaykenarı, Korkuteli
- Çomaklı, Korkuteli
- Çukurca, Korkuteli
- Çıvgalar, Korkuteli
- İmecik, Korkuteli
- İmrahor, Korkuteli

== Kumluca ==
- Adrasan, Kumluca
- Altınyaka, Kumluca
- Belen, Kumluca
- Beykonak, Kumluca
- Beşikçi, Kumluca
- Büyükalan, Kumluca
- Dereköy, Kumluca
- Erentepe, Kumluca
- Gölcük, Kumluca
- Güzören, Kumluca
- Hacıveliler, Kumluca
- Hızırkahya, Kumluca
- Karaağaç, Kumluca
- Karacaören, Kumluca
- Kavakköy, Kumluca
- Kumluca, Antalya
- Kuzca, Kumluca
- Mavikent, Kumluca
- Olimpos, Kumluca
- Ortaköy, Kumluca
- Salur, Kumluca
- Sarıcasu, Kumluca
- Toptaş, Kumluca
- Yazır, Kumluca
- Yenikışla, Kumluca
- Yeşilköy, Kumluca
- Çaltı, Kumluca
- Çayiçi, Kumluca
- İncircik, Kumluca

== Manavgat ==
- Ahmetler, Manavgat
- Aksaz, Manavgat
- Altınkaya, Manavgat
- Aşağıışıklar, Manavgat
- Ballıbucak, Manavgat
- Belenobası, Manavgat
- Bereket, Manavgat
- Beydiğin, Manavgat
- Boztepe, Manavgat
- Bozyaka, Manavgat
- Bucakşeyhler, Manavgat
- Burmahan, Manavgat
- Büklüce, Manavgat
- Cevizler, Manavgat
- Demirciler, Manavgat
- Denizkent, Manavgat
- Denizyaka, Manavgat
- Değirmenli, Manavgat
- Değirmenözü, Manavgat
- Dikmen, Manavgat
- Dolbazlar, Manavgat
- Doğançam, Manavgat
- Düzağaç, Manavgat
- Evrenleryavşı, Manavgat
- Evrenseki, Manavgat
- Gaziler, Manavgat
- Gebece, Manavgat
- Gençler, Manavgat
- Gültepe, Manavgat
- Gündoğdu, Manavgat
- Güzelyalı, Manavgat
- Hacıali, Manavgat
- Hacıisalı, Manavgat
- Hacıobası, Manavgat
- Halitağalar, Manavgat
- Hatipler, Manavgat
- Hocalar, Manavgat
- Hocalı, Manavgat
- Ilıca, Manavgat
- Kadılar, Manavgat
- Kalemler, Manavgat
- Karabucak, Manavgat
- Karabük, Manavgat
- Karacalar, Manavgat
- Karakaya, Manavgat
- Karaöz, Manavgat
- Kırkkavak, Manavgat
- Kısalar, Manavgat
- Kızılağaç, Manavgat
- Kızıldağ, Manavgat
- Kızılot, Manavgat
- Manavgat, Antalya
- Odaönü, Manavgat
- Oymapınar, Manavgat
- Parakende, Manavgat
- Salur, Manavgat
- Saraçlı, Manavgat
- Sarılar, Manavgat
- Sağırin, Manavgat
- Sevinç, Manavgat
- Seydiler, Manavgat
- Side, Manavgat
- Sülek, Manavgat
- Sırtköy, Manavgat
- Taşağıl, Manavgat
- Taşkesiği, Manavgat
- Tepeköy, Manavgat
- Tilkiler, Manavgat
- Ulukapı, Manavgat
- Uzunkale, Manavgat
- Uzunlar, Manavgat
- Yalçıdibi, Manavgat
- Yavrudoğan, Manavgat
- Yaylaalan, Manavgat
- Yeniköy, Manavgat
- Yeşilbağ, Manavgat
- Yukarıışıklar, Manavgat
- Çakış, Manavgat
- Çaltepe, Manavgat
- Çamlıtepe, Manavgat
- Çardak, Manavgat
- Çavuş, Manavgat
- Çayyazı, Manavgat
- Çeltikçi, Manavgat
- Çenger, Manavgat
- Çolaklı, Manavgat
- Örenşehir, Manavgat
- Şişeler, Manavgat

== Serik ==
- Akbaş, Serik
- Akçapınar, Serik
- Alacami, Serik
- Aşağıkocayatak, Serik
- Aşağıoba, Serik
- Aşağıçatma, Serik
- Belek, Serik
- Belkıs, Serik
- Berendi, Serik
- Bilginler, Serik
- Bozdoğan, Serik
- Boğazkent, Serik
- Bucakköy, Serik
- Burmahancı, Serik
- Büğüş, Serik
- Cumalı, Serik
- Demirciler, Serik
- Deniztepesi, Serik
- Dikmen, Serik
- Dorumlar, Serik
- Eminceler, Serik
- Eskiyürük, Serik
- Etler, Serik
- Gedik, Serik
- Gökçepınar, Serik
- Hacıosmanlar, Serik
- Hasdümen, Serik
- Hasgebe, Serik
- Haskızılören, Serik
- Kadriye, Serik
- Karataş, Serik
- Karıncalı, Serik
- Kayaburnu, Serik
- Kozan, Serik
- Kozağaç, Serik
- Kumköy, Serik
- Kuşlar, Serik
- Kırbaş, Serik
- Nebiler, Serik
- Pınarcık, Serik
- Sarıabalı, Serik
- Serik
- Tekkeköy, Serik
- Töngüşlü, Serik
- Yanköy, Serik
- Yeşilvadi, Serik
- Yeşilyurt, Serik
- Yukarıkocayatak, Serik
- Yukarıçatma, Serik
- Yumaklar, Serik
- Zırlankaya, Serik
- Çakallık, Serik
- Çanakçı, Serik
- Çandır, Serik
- Çatallar, Serik
- Üründü, Serik
- Şatırlı, Serik

== İbradı ==
- Ormana, İbradı
- İbradı

== Recent development ==
According to Law act no 6360, all Turkish provinces with a population more than 750 000, were renamed as metropolitan municipality. All districts in those provinces became second level municipalities and all villages in those districts were renamed as a neighborhoods. Thus the villages listed above are officially neighborhoods of Antalya.
