= Seroiata =

Town of ancient Lycia

Coordinates: 36°14′35″N 29°32′38″E

Seroiata was a town of ancient Lycia, between Patara and Phellus. The name is attested in the Life of Saint Nicholas of Sion.

According to the "Life of Saint Nicholas of Sion", two men from Seroiata came to Nicholas for healing. Paul and another man, Kyriakos, were both healed of evil spirits after Nicholas prayed over them.

Its site is located near the modern town of Seyret, Asiatic Turkey.
