= Güneyköy =

Güneyköy may refer to the following places in Turkey:

- Güneyköy, Acıpayam or Güney, a neighbourhood in Denizli Province
- Güneyköy, Alanya or Güney, a neighbourhood in Alanya, Antalya Province
- Güneyköy, Bozdoğan or Güney, a neighbourhood in Aydın Province
- Güneyköy, Çorum or Güney, a village in Çorum Province
- Güneyköy, Emirdağ or Güney, a village Afyonkarahisar Province
- Güneyköy, Gazipaşa, a neighbourhood in Antalya Province
- Güneyköy, Ilgaz, a village in Çankırı Province
- Güneyköy, Kargı, a village in Çorum Province
- Güneyköy, Karpuzlu or Güney, a neighbourhood in Aydın Province
- Güneyköy, Pazar or Güney, a village in Rize Province
- Güneyköy, Yalova, a village in Yalova Province
