= Nisa (Lycia) =

Ancient city of Lycia

Coordinates: 36°26′29″N 29°37′35″E

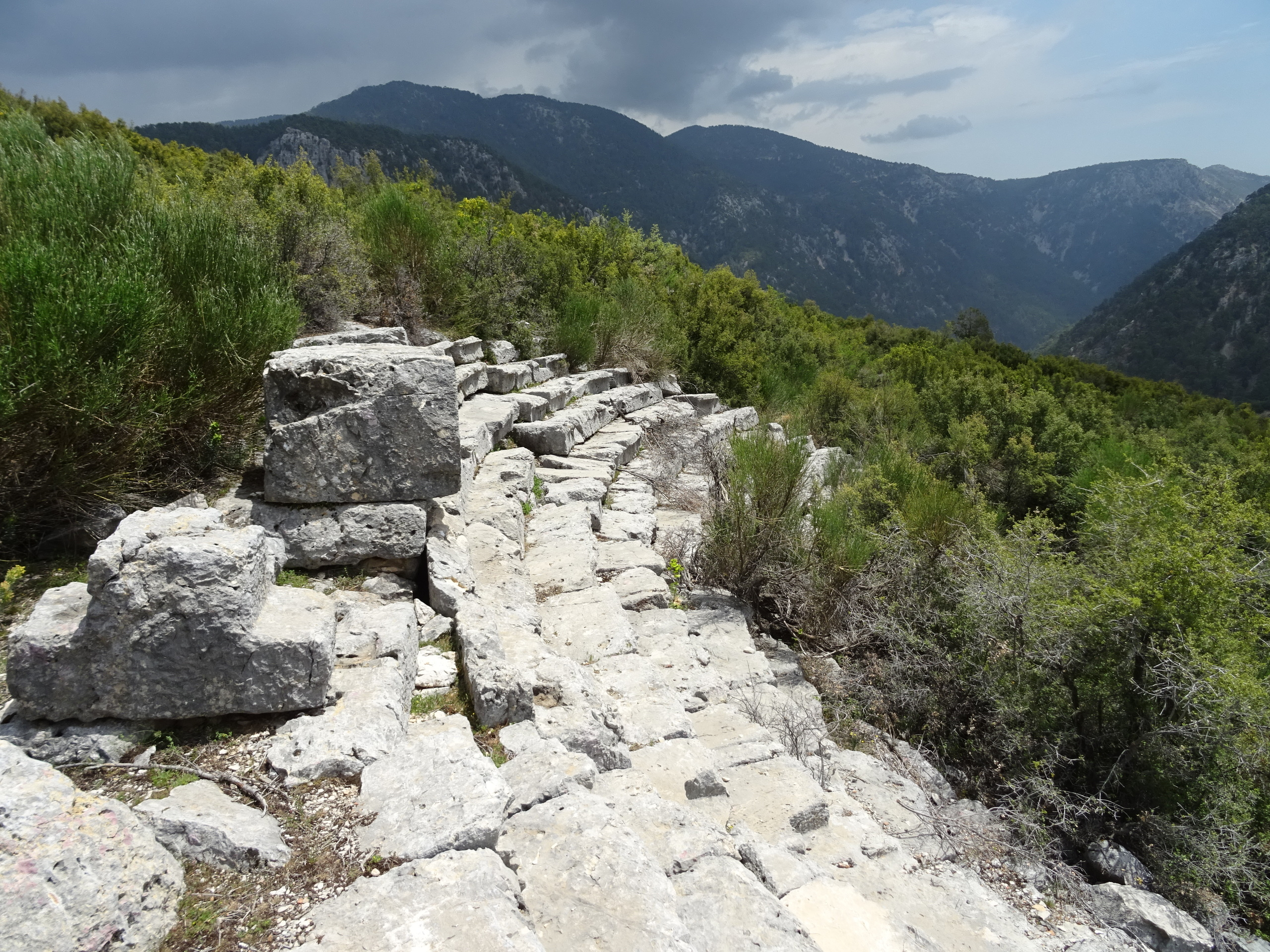
Nisa Theatre

Nisa (Ancient Greek: Νίσα or Νίσσα), also Nyssa (Νύσσα) or Nysa (Νύσα) or Neisa (Νείσα), was a town in ancient Lycia near the source of the River Xanthus.

== Location ==
Its site is identified in the Digital Atlas of the Roman Empire as Akörü Yayla, near Sütleğen, about 25 kilometres north of Kaş in Antalya Province, Turkey. The Annuario Pontifico gives its location as Küçükahuriyala, also near Sütleğen.

== Site ==
The ruins are plentiful but in a poor state. They include part of the well-built city wall, a theatre, a stadium, a paved agora with stoa and some bases bearing inscriptions. The necropolis to the west includes sarcophagi and constructed tombs.

== History ==
Apart from its mention by Ptolemy and by Hierocles in the Synecdemus (ca. 535 AD), where it is misspelled "Misae" (Μίσαι), and in the Notitiae Episcopatuum, nothing is known of the town's history. The only known coin that it issued is of a type that does not show membership of the Lycian League.

== Bishopric ==
A Christian bishopric was established in Nisa, a suffragan of the metropolitan see of Myra. The only bishop of the see whose name is preserved in extant documents is Georgius, who took part in the Second Council of Nicaea in 787.

No longer a residential bishopric, Nisa in Lycia is today listed by the Catholic Church as a titular see.
