= Karamanlar =

Karamanlar can refer to the following villages:

- Karamanlar, Alanya
- Karamanlar, Bolu
- Karamanlar, Dursunbey
- Karamanlar, Gündoğmuş
