= ISBA =

ISBA or isba may refer to:

== Organisations ==
- Illinois State Bar Association, US
- Indiana State Bar Association, US
- International Society for Bayesian Analysis
- Incorporated Society of British Advertisers, a UK industry association that under a previous name created the Audit Bureau of Circulations

== Other uses ==
- Isba, an ancient city of Asia Minor

== See also ==
- Izba, a traditional Russian log house
- International Seabed Authority (ISA)
