= Geris =

Geris may refer to

- Geriş (disambiguation), name of several Turkish villages
- Saint-Gilles-les-Forêts (Occitan: Sent Geris), a commune in France
- Harry Geris (1947–2008), Canadian Olympic wrestler
