= Bayır =

Bayır (literally "hill") is a Turkish place name and may refer to the following places:

== Turkey ==
- Bayır, Alanya, a village in Alanya district, Antalya Province
- Bayır, Muğla, a town in Muğla Province
  - Bayır Dam, a dam near the town

== Syria ==
- Bayir, a hilly region in northwestern Syria on the border with Turkey.

== See also ==
- Bayırköy (disambiguation), literally "hill village"
- Bayırlı (disambiguation), literally "place with hill(s)"
