= Çamlıköy =

Çamlıköy may refer to:

- Kalo Chorio (Çamlıköy)
- Çamlıköy, Kaş
