= Kandyba =

Human settlement

Coordinates: 36.321453°N 29.679548°E

Kandyba or Candyba (Hittite: 𒄭𒅔𒁺𒉿 Hinduwa, Lycian: 𐊜𐊙𐊋𐊂𐊆 Xãkbi, Ancient Greek: Κάνδυβα, Latin: Candyba) was a settlement in ancient Lycia, in modern-day Antalya province on the southwestern Mediterranean coast of Turkey.

The modern Turkish village next to the ruins of ancient Kandyba is named Çataloluk.

== Name ==
The name Kandyba is the Greek version of the Lycian name Khãkbi. During the Bronze Age, the city may have been known to the Hittites as Hinduwa.

Stephanus of Byzantium reports a mythological tradition that the city took its name from Candybus, son of Deucalion.

== Geography ==
The ancient settlement is set on a hilltop high above the plain of Kasaba, 13 kilometres north of Kaş. The modern village is located to the south of the ruins.

== History ==
In antiquity, Candyba was one of the smaller cities of Lycia, but was an independent polis with voting rights in the Lycian League and minted its own coins.

Since it was in the Roman province of Lycia, the bishopric of Candyba was a suffragan of the metropolitan see of Myra, the province's capital. The names of two of its bishops are preserved in extant records. Constantinus took part in the Second Council of Nicaea in 787; and Basilius was at the Photian Council of Constantinople (879).

No longer a residential bishopric, Candyba is today listed by the Catholic Church as a titular see.

== Archaeology ==
Some of the rock tombs are beautifully executed. One perfect inscription in Lycian characters was found. A coin procured on the spot from the peasantry had the letters KAND on it.
