= İmircik =

İmircik may refer to:

- İmircik, Vezirköprü, Turkey
- İmircik, Elmalı, Turkey
