= Gözübüyük =

Gözübüyük may refer to:

- Gözübüyük, Alanya, village in Antalya Province, Turkey
- Gözübüyük, Gündoğmuş, village in Antalya Province, Turkey
- Gözübüyük, Laçin
- Serdar Gözübüyük, Dutch football referee of Turkish descent
- Tarkan Gözübüyük, Turkish musician
