= Bayırköy =

Bayırköy (literally "hill village") is a Turkish place name and may refer to the following places in Turkey:

- Bayırköy, Alanya, a village in Alanya district, Antalya Province
- Bayırköy, Bilecik, a village in the central district of Bilecik Province
- Bayırköy, Daday
- Bayırköy, Gelibolu
- Bayırköy, Gündoğmuş, a village in Gündoğmuş district, Antalya Province
- Bayırköy, Hınıs
- Bayırköy, Kızılcahamam, a village in Kızılcahamam district, Ankara Province
- Bayırköy, Kulp
- Bayırköy, Orhangazi
- Bayırköy, Milas

== See also ==
- Bayırköy (disambiguation), literally "hill"
- Bayırlı (disambiguation), literally "place with hill(s)"
