= Kuzuköy =

Kuzuköy can refer to:

- Kuzuköy, Çankırı
- Kuzuköy, Elmalı
