= Phellus =

Town of ancient Lycia

Phellos
- Phellos (Turkish); Φέλλος (Ancient Greek) (Ancient Greek)
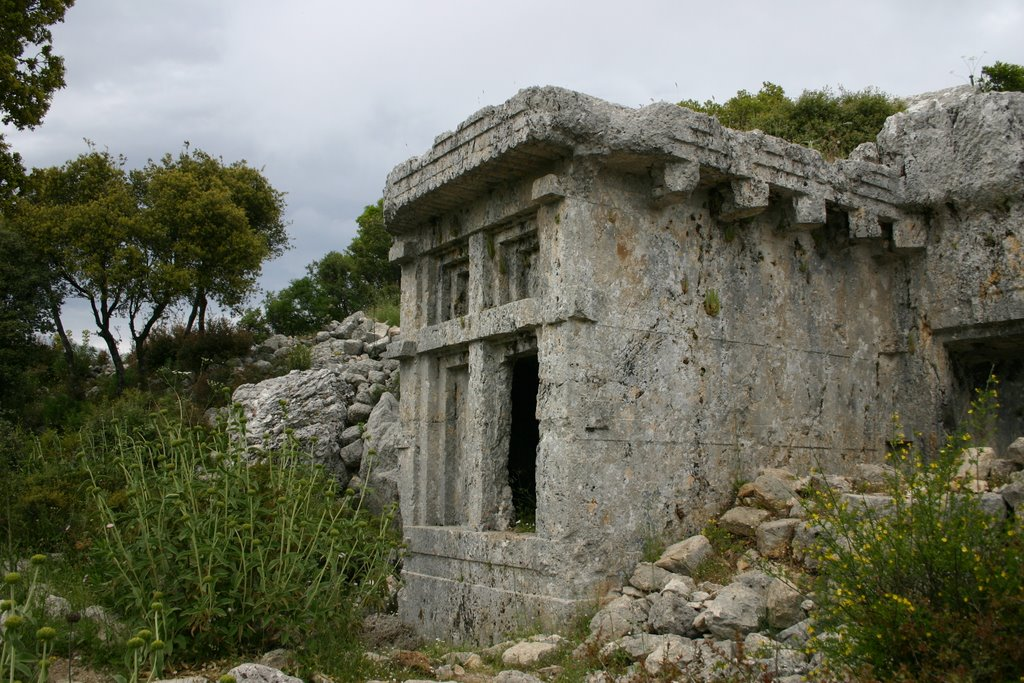
- A Lycian tomb at Phellus
- Interactive map of Phellos
- 36°14′05″N 29°37′56″E
- Type: Settlement
- Location: near modern Çukurbağ, Antalya Province, Turkey
- Region: Lycia

Site notes
- Excavation dates: 1840
- Archaeologists: Charles Fellows
- Condition: Ruined
- Public access: Yes

Phellus (Turkish: Phellos, Lycian: Wehnti; Ancient Greek: Φέλλος) is the site of an ancient Lycian city, situated in a mountainous area near Çukurbağ in Antalya Province, Turkey. The city was mentioned by the Greek geographer and philosopher Strabo in his Geographica. Antiphellus served as the city's port.

There was in the past some confusion amongst scholars about the exact location of Phellus. In 1840, using Greek inscriptions that were difficult to read, the English explorer and archaeologist Charles Fellows considered the city to be located near the village of Saaret.

== History ==
Phellus (Ancient Greek: Phellos: "stony ground") was an ancient Lycian city, that first appeared in the records when it was mentioned by the Greek historian and geographer Hecataeus in c. 500 BC, who incorrectly located it in Pamphylia. Scylax of Caryanda, writing in the late 6th or early 5th century BC, mentioned Phellus. Tombs at Phellus provide some of the earliest evidence for the settlement of the region by the Lycians.

The city was a member of the Lycian League, during a period when it controlled lands in the region, and the castles at Bayındır and Limanı. According to Hecataeus, the Lycian name for the city was Vehinda. The settlement is unusual in being known nowadays by its Greek name. The Lycians used their own name for the city. Jan Zahle's analysis of the distribution and nature of Lycian tombs concludes that during the classical period, Phellos, Limyra and Patara were cities that ranked just below Xanthos in importance. During the 5th century, members of the Xanthian royal family resided there, and so the city at one time played a central political role. However, urban expansion did not occur, although a small theatre was constructed, and the classical monuments were carefully preserved by successive generation.

Phellus was inland, and Antiphellus, a coastal settlement to the south, served as its port. Phellus, unlike Antiphellus, is not mentioned in the Roman guidebook for sailors, the Stadiasmus Maris Magni. It was an important town by the 5th century BC, remaining an important centre until the following century, with a notable heroön (dedicated shrine for a hero). The city's role as a dynastic centre ended with its conquest by Perikle of Limyra in the 390s. During the Hellenistic period, Antiphellos superseded Phellus, and expanded into a thriving commercial centre, whilst Phellus diminished in importance.

Phellus became a metropolitan see during the Byzantine period. (Note: Phellus remains a titular see of the Roman Catholic Church.)

== Description ==
Phellus and Antiphellus

Phellus is located near the small settlement of Çukurbağ. The site is reached by means of a footpath that leads through the undergrowth. The hilltop site is 550 metres (1,800 ft) long and 150 metres (490 ft) wide. Parts of the city's northern wall are visible; the corresponding wall on the south side is barely recognizable.

The ruins mainly consist of the remains of the city walls surrounding an acropolis, with what were probably watchtowers adjoining them. There are fully and partly exposed and rock tombs, including an example of one with a Greek inscription, and an epitaph written in Lycian. Towards the west end of the site is a free-standing tomb of house-type cut from the rock; the chamber has benches on three sides. Other ruins include house-tombs and other small tombs of various states of preservation, a semi-circular wall, and a rock-wall with a relief of a bull. There is a natural spring nearby.

A well-preserved sarcophagus with reliefs on three sides is located close by the walls. One relief shows two birds and three figures, one of which is a reclining man holding a cup;. another depicts a warrior, but partly destroyed by a large hole broken into the tomb, and on the lid are a pair of griffins and two figures. The Greek inscription on one sarcophagus can be read. Beyond the main site are five other sarcophagi.

== Archaeology ==
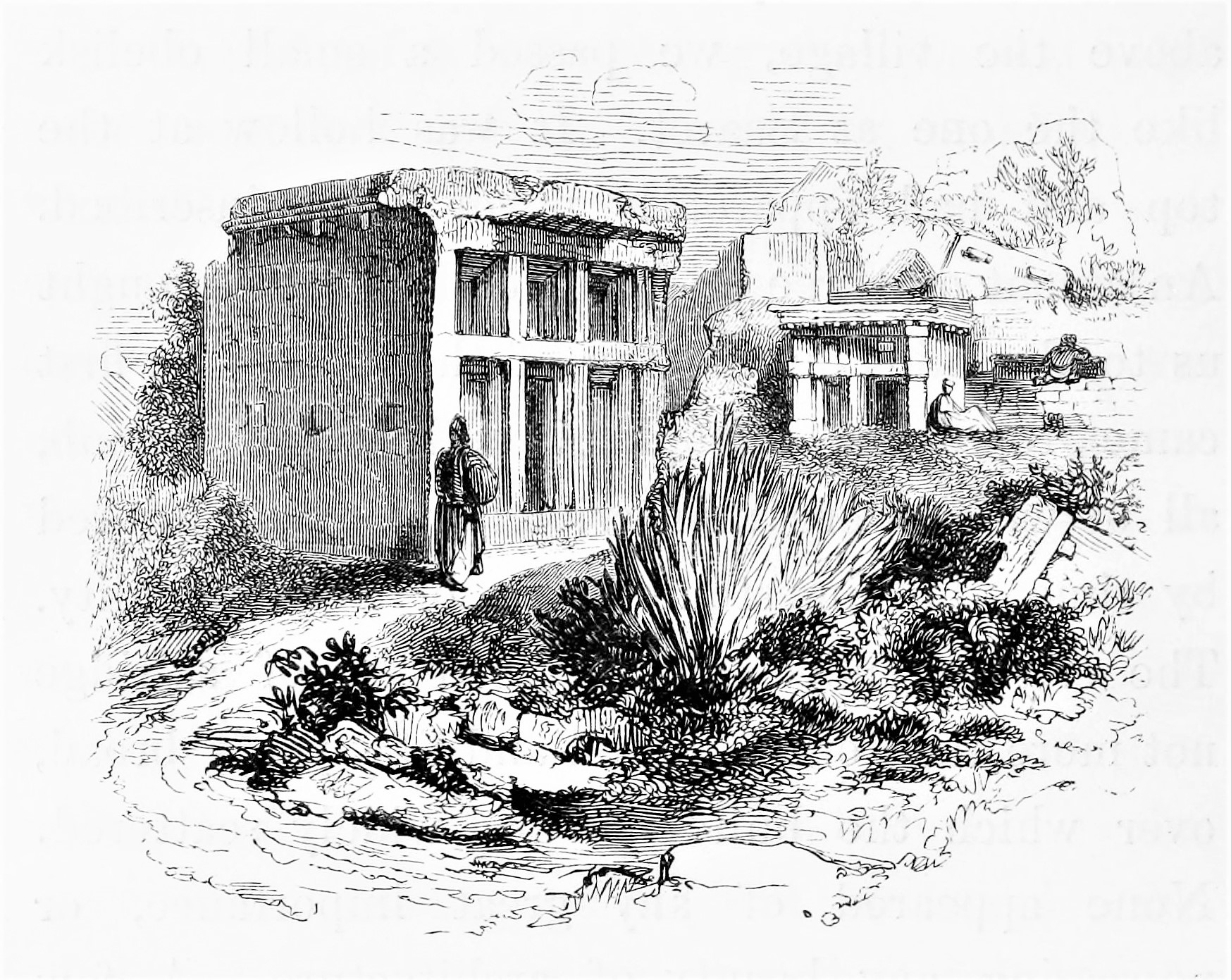
Thomas Abel Brimage Spratt's depiction of Phellus (1847)

In 1842, an expedition to Lycia, led by the English naval officer Thomas Abel Brimage Spratt, continued the work of the British naval officer Richard Hoskyn and his assistant, W.S. Harvey, in the restoration of archaeological sites discovered by the English explorer Charles Fellows.

Spratt journeyed to the small farming village of Saaret north of Antiphellus, accompanied by Panayotis, the same guide Fellows had used to discover the settlement. He visited a site on the mountain of Felendağı, near Çukurbağ, and concluded that it was Phellus. Wanting to charter and survey Phellus for himself, he consulted the works of Roman scholars to verify the location of the ruins; citing Livy's claim of a town near Phoenicus that acted as "the port of Phellus", and Pliny the Elder's writings, which suggested that Phellus was directly north of Habessus, a pre-Hellenic name for Antiphellus.

In an hour we reached a small plateau on the top of the ridge; crossing it, we came to the village at the foot of a hill, a spur of the mountain intervening between this little plain and the valley of Saaret The name of this place our guide said was Fellerdagh—the resemblance of which to Phellus, and the situation so near behind Antiphellus, gave us hopes that we had now discovered the true situation of that city.

— Thomas Abel Brimage Spratt, Travels in Lycia, Milyas, and the Cibyratis, in company with the late Rev. E. T. Daniell (1847)

Spratt's findings were first challenged in 1892, when the German-Austrian archaeologist Otto Benndorf determined that Phellus was located on the coast across the bay from Antiphellus.

Phellus has been intensively surveyed, but is one of a number of Lycian sites where a lack of archaeological evidence prevents it from being classified as a town comparable in size to Xanthus. Subsequent building activity has meant that few architectural details can now be identified, and the social and economic structure of the city has not been determined.

== Sources ==
=== Primary sources ===
- Livius Patavinus, Titus (1836). Livy: Book XXXI–XXXVIII. New York: Harper & Brothers. OCLC 613192896.
- Plinius Secundus, Gaius (1848). Pliny's Natural History. Massachusetts: Harvard University Press. OCLC 578716495.

=== Secondary sources ===
- Akşit, İlhan (2006). Kline, Stuart (ed.). Lycia: The Land of Light. Istanbul: Aksit Kultur Turizm Sanat Ajans Lt. ISBN 975-7039-11-X.
- Bayburtluoğlu, Cevdet (2004). Lycia. Antalya: Suna & İnan Kıraç Research Institute on Mediterranean Civilizations. ISBN 978-97570-7-820-3.
- Bean, George Ewart (1978). Lycian Turkey: An Archaeological Guide. London: Benn. ISBN 978-05100-3-205-0.
- Keen, Antony G. (2018). Dynastic Lycia: A Political History of the Lycians and Their Relations with Foreign Powers, C. 545–362 B.C. Leiden: Brill Publishers. ISBN 978-90043-5-152-3.
- Kolb, Frank (2019). "From Mountain to Coastal Plain: Settings of Settlements and Stages of Urbanisation in Ancient Lycia". In de Ligt, Luuk; Bintliff, John (eds.). Regional Urban Systems in the Roman World, 150 BCE – 250 CE. Leiden: Brill Publishers. ISBN 978-90-04-41433-4.
- Spratt, Thomas (1847a). Travels in Lycia, Milyas, and the Cibyratis, in company with the late Rev. E. T. Daniell. Vol. 1. London: J. Van Voorst. OCLC 582161294.
- Spratt, Thomas (1847b). Travels in Lycia, Milyas, and the Cibyratis, in company with the late Rev. E. T. Daniell. Vol. 2. London: J. Van Voorst. OCLC 582161294.
- Zimmermann, Martin (1992). Untersuchungen zur historischen Landeskunde Zentrallykiens [Investigations into the Historical Geography of Central Lycia] (in German). Bonn, Germany: Habelt. pp. 61–67. ISBN 978-37749-2-553-3.
- Zimmermann, Martin (2002). "Phellus". In Cancik, Hubert; Schneider, Helmuth (eds.). Brill's New Pauly: Encyclopaedia of the Ancient World. Vol. 10. Leiden: Brill Publishers.
