= Geriş =

Geriş may refer to the following villages in Turkey:

- Geriş, Akseki
- Geriş-bucak merkezi, Akseki
- Geriş, Bartın
- Geriş, Bodrum
- Geriş, Çaycuma
- Geriş, Kıbrıscık
- Geriş, Yığılca
