= Oba, Alanya =

Oba
- Neighbourhood
- Location in Turkey
- Coordinates: 36°33′N 32°04′E
- Country: Turkey
- Province: Antalya
- District: Alanya
- Elevation: 30 m (98 ft)
- Population (2022): 28,864
- Time zone: UTC+3 (TRT)
- Postal code: 07460
- Area code: 0242

Oba (or Obaköy) is a neighbourhood in the municipality and district of Alanya, Antalya Province, Turkey. Its population is 28,864 (2022). Before the 2013 reorganisation, it was a town (belde). It is almost merged to Alanya. It is about 140 kilometres (87 mi) from Antalya.

In the Middle Ages, Oba was the capital of Alaiye Beylik. In 1934, a part of Oba was issued from the main settlement to form the Çıplaklı village. In 1999, Oba was declared a seat of township. The main crops of the town are citrus and dwarf apple. Being very close to Alanya, services to the city are also a part of the town's economy.

== Notable residents ==
- Kaygusuz Abdal (14th and early 15th-century Turkish folk poet)

== Sister cities ==
- Pniewy (Poland)
- Oer-Erkenschwick (Germany)
