= Kaş =

- District and municipality
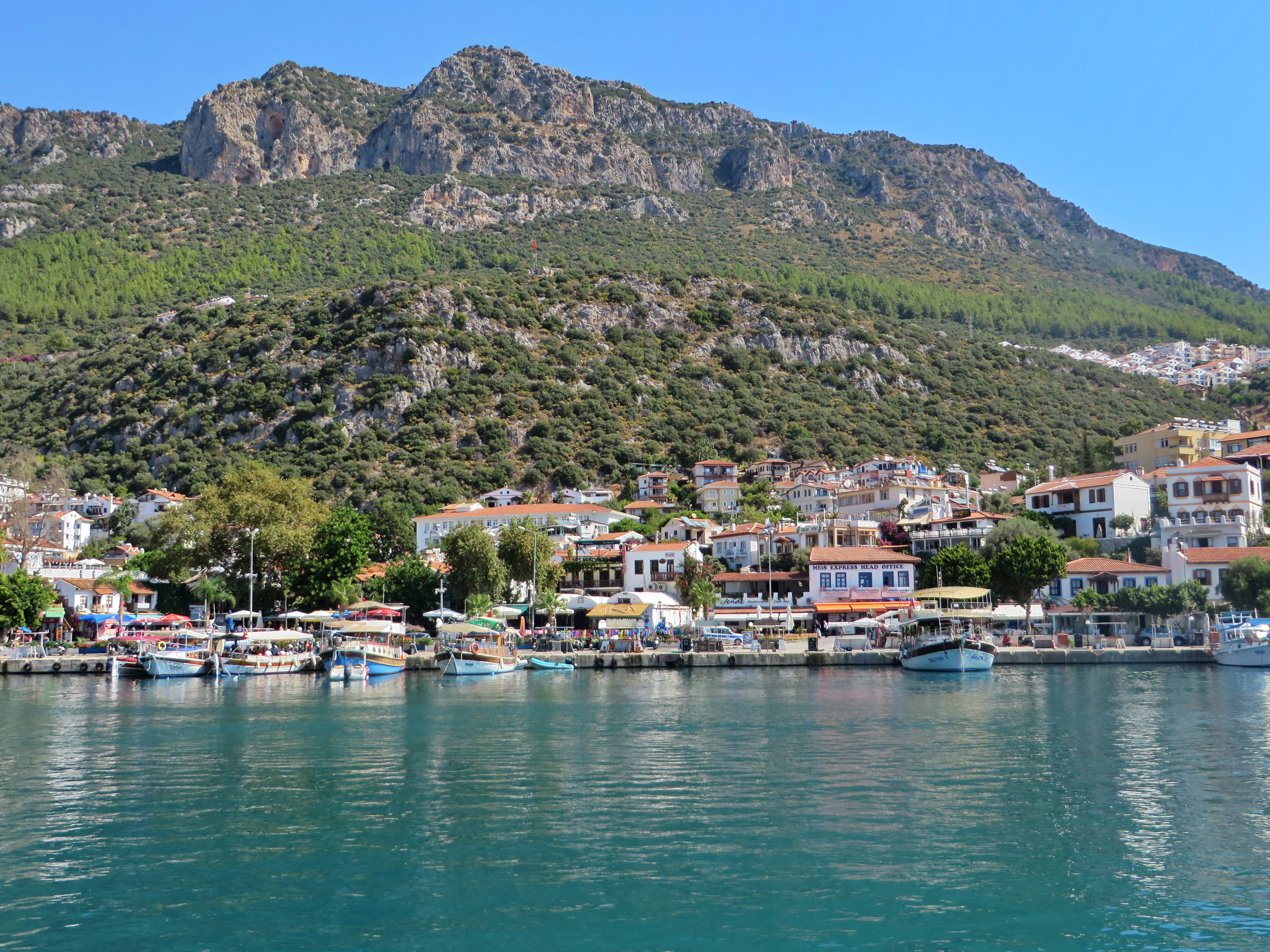
- Kaş town seen from the sea

- Logo

- Map showing Kaş District in Antalya Province

- Location within Turkey
- Coordinates: 36°12′00″N 29°38′30″E
- Country: Turkey
- Province: Antalya

Government
  - Mayor: Erol Demirhan (Ind.)
- Area: 1,750 km^{2} (680 sq mi)
- Elevation: 10–15 m (33–49 ft)
- Population (2025): 63,957
  - Density: 36.5/km^{2} (94.7/sq mi)
- Time zone: UTC+3 (TRT)
- Postal code: 07580
- Area code: 0242
- Website: www.kas.bel.tr

Kaş (Turkish pronunciation: [kaʃ]) is a small fishing, diving, yachting and tourist town, and a municipality and district of Antalya Province, Turkey. Its area is 1,750 km^{2}, and its population is 63,957 (2025). It is 168 km west of the city of Antalya. As a tourist resort, it is relatively unspoiled.

== History ==
Although the Teke peninsula has been occupied since the Stone Age, it seems Kaş was founded by the Lycians, and its name in Lycian language was Habesos or Habesa. It was a member of the Lycian League, and its importance during this time is confirmed by the presence of one of the richest Lycian necropoleis.

In the Hellenistic period and under the Roman Empire it served as the port of Phellus called Antiphellus (Greek: Αντίφελλος, romanized: Antífellos), the name by which it was known at that time.

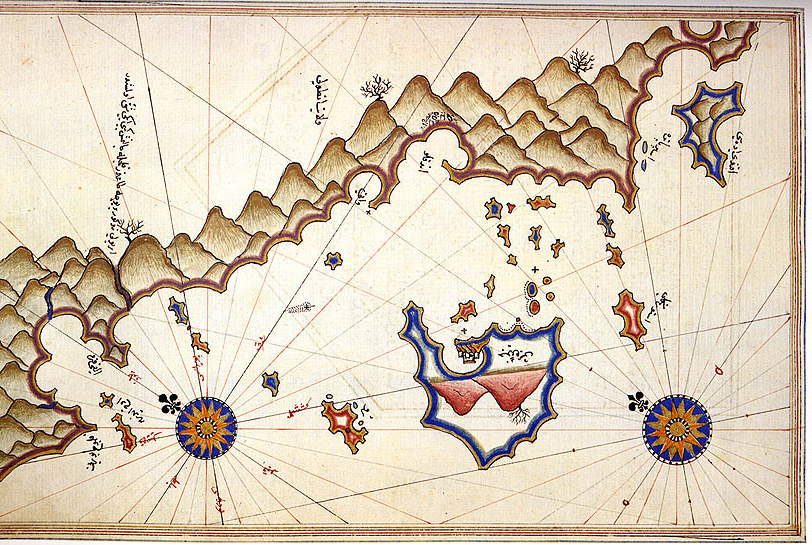
Historic map of Kaş by Piri Reis

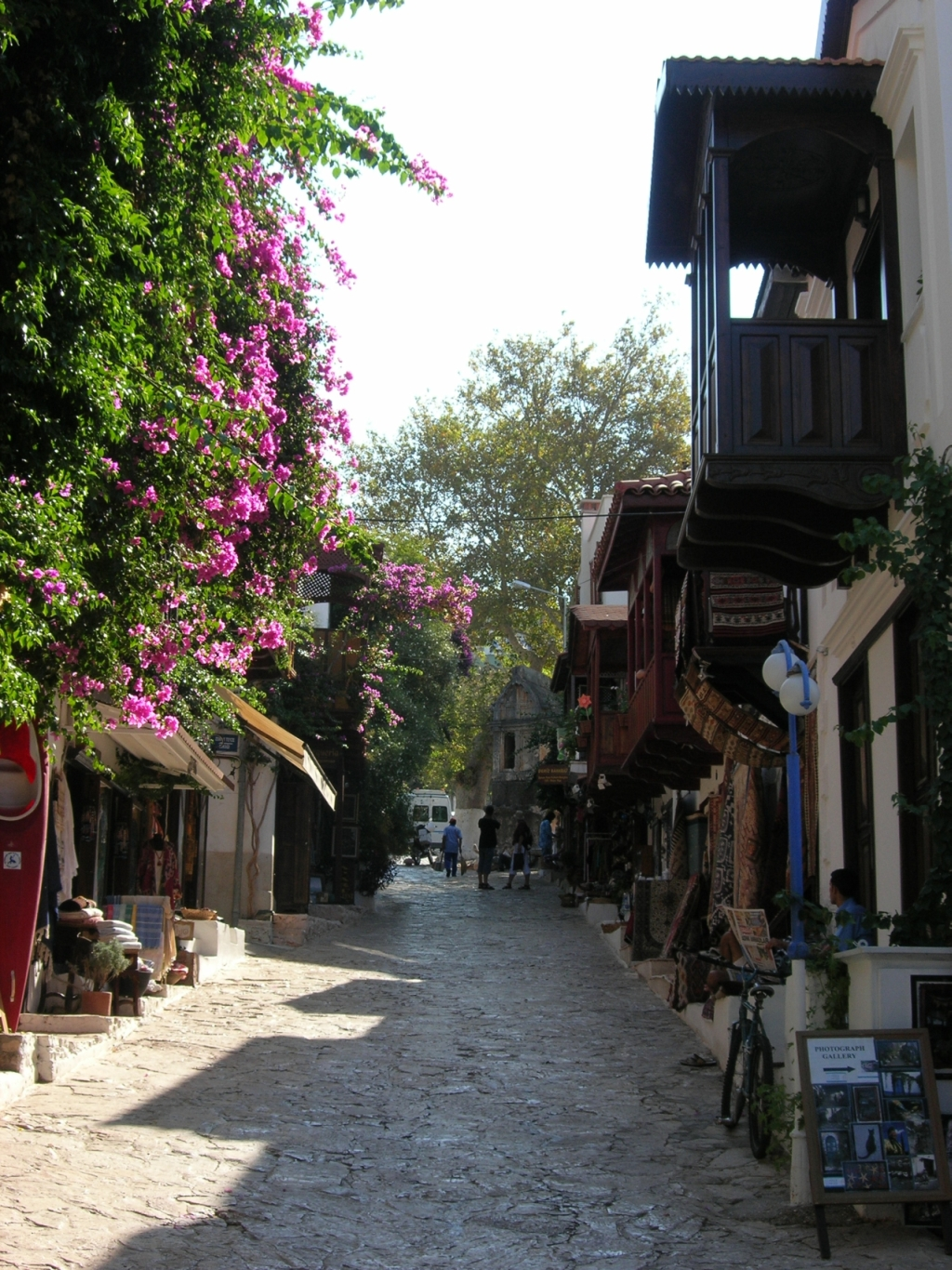
A street in Kaş with traditional houses and a Lycian tomb in the background

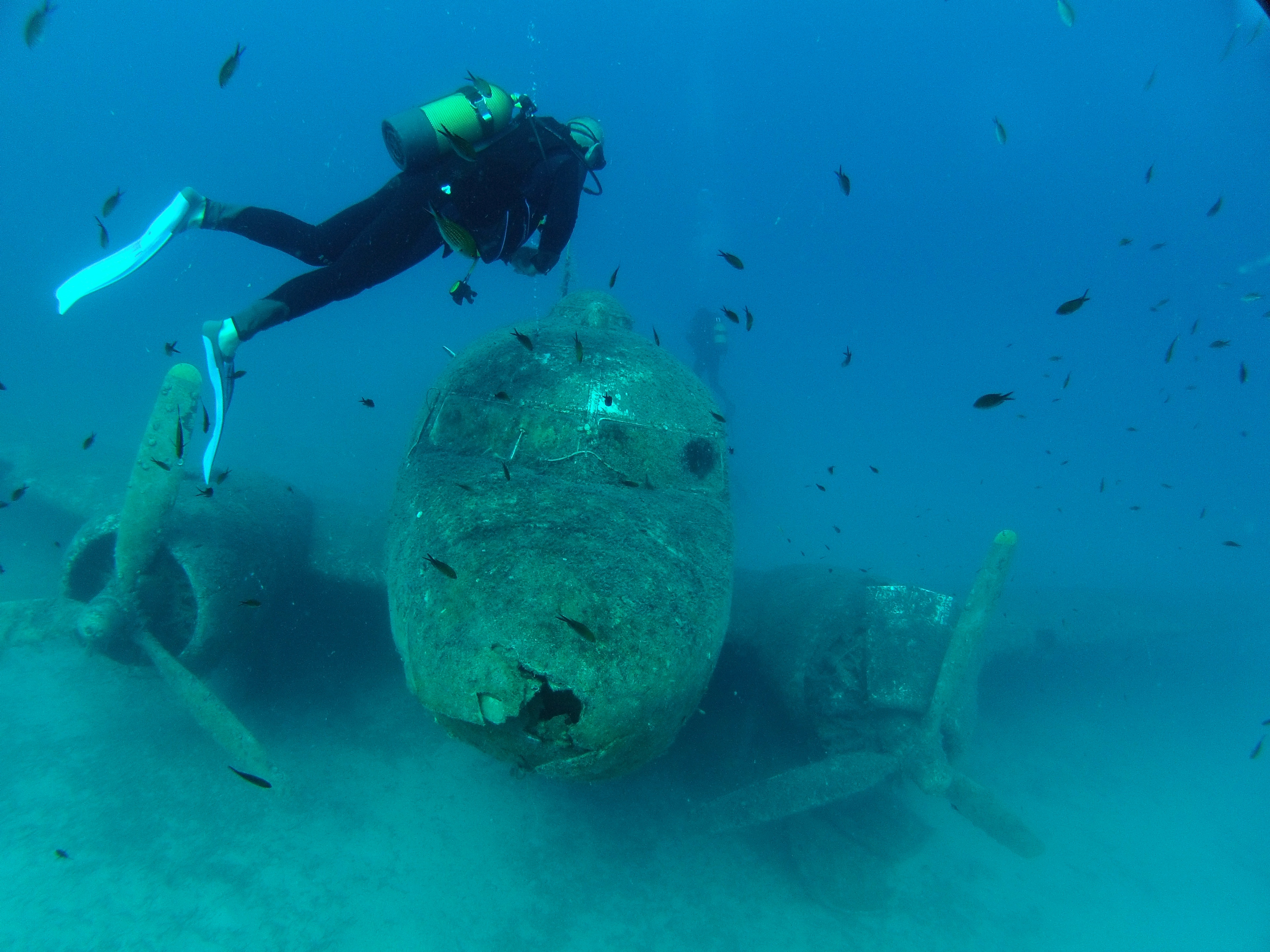
Artificial wreck of a Douglas DC-3, one of about 50 dive spots in the vicinity of Kaş

The town suffered because of Arab incursions, then was annexed (under the name of Andifli) to the Anatolian Sultanate of Rum, led by the Seljuks. After the demise of the Seljuks, it came under the Ottomans.

In 1923, because of the forcible exchange of populations between Greece and Turkey after the Greco-Turkish War, population of Greek origin in the area left for Greece.

In the early 1990s tourism started booming in Kaş, with visitors mainly from the UK and Germany. This growth of tourism brought an explosion in apartment building (often without license), which is seriously threatening the landscape and the environment. Particularly affected is the Çukurbağ Peninsula, west of the town, which now has luxury hotels built on it.

== Geography ==
As the tenth most populous district of Antalya as of 2022, Kaş is on a hill running down to the Turquoise Coast of southwestern Turkey. The district has a typical Mediterranean climate of hot, dry summers and mild, wet winters, which allows the growth of oranges, lemons and bananas. The lowland areas are also planted with cut flowers and a variety of fruits and vegetables. Many are grown all year round under glass. The hillsides produce honey and almonds, while at high altitudes there are extensive pine forests. The weather is drier at high altitudes. Although agriculture is still important, tourism is the main source of income in the district, which has many hotels and guest houses.

About 6 km (4 mi) offshore from Kaş is the Greek islet of Kastelórizo (in Turkish Meis Adası) served by a Turkish ferry daily with the option of same day returns.

Climate data for Kaş (1991–2020)
Month	Jan	Feb	Mar	Apr	May	Jun	Jul	Aug	Sep	Oct	Nov	Dec	Year
Mean daily maximum °C (°F)	15.9 (60.6)	16.1 (61.0)	18.1 (64.6)	21.1 (70.0)	25.2 (77.4)	29.5 (85.1)	32.5 (90.5)	32.9 (91.2)	30.2 (86.4)	26.3 (79.3)	21.8 (71.2)	17.5 (63.5)	24.0 (75.2)
Daily mean °C (°F)	12.2 (54.0)	12.4 (54.3)	14.2 (57.6)	16.9 (62.4)	21.0 (69.8)	25.2 (77.4)	28.3 (82.9)	28.7 (83.7)	25.9 (78.6)	22.1 (71.8)	17.7 (63.9)	13.9 (57.0)	19.9 (67.8)
Mean daily minimum °C (°F)	9.2 (48.6)	9.9 (49.8)	11.4 (52.5)	14.0 (57.2)	17.9 (64.2)	22.1 (71.8)	25.1 (77.2)	25.7 (78.3)	23.0 (73.4)	19.6 (67.3)	15.1 (59.2)	11.0 (51.8)	17.0 (62.6)
Average precipitation mm (inches)	179.07 (7.05)	122.84 (4.84)	74.81 (2.95)	40.61 (1.60)	15.83 (0.62)	2.54 (0.10)	0.89 (0.04)	0.15 (0.01)	14.7 (0.58)	74.12 (2.92)	111.31 (4.38)	197.27 (7.77)	834.14 (32.84)
Average precipitation days (≥ 1.0 mm)	11.3	9.0	6.3	4.8	2.4	1.2	1.0	2.0	1.8	3.8	5.8	10.5	59.9
Source: NOAA

== Composition ==
There are 54 neighbourhoods in Kaş District:

- Ağullu
- Ahatlı
- Aklar
- Akörü
- Bayındır
- Beldibi
- Belenli
- Belkonak
- Bezirgan
- Boğazcık
- Çamlıköy
- Çamlıova
- Çataloluk
- Çavdır
- Çayköy
- Cemre
- Çerler
- Çeşmeköy
- Çukurbağ
- Dereköy
- Dirgenler
- Doğantaş
- Gelemiş
- Gökçeören
- Gökçeyazı
- Gömbe
- Gürsu
- Hacıoğlan
- İkizce
- İslamlar
- Kalkan
- Karadağ
- Kasaba
- Kemerköy
- Kılıçlı
- Kılıçlıyayla
- Kınık
- Kızılağaç
- Merkez
- Ortabağ
- Ova
- Palamutköy
- Pınarbaşı
- Sarıbelen
- Sarılar
- Sinneli
- Sütleğen
- Uğrar
- Üzümlü
- Yaylapalamut
- Yeniköy
- Yeşilbarak
- Yeşilköy
- Yuvacık

== Tourism ==
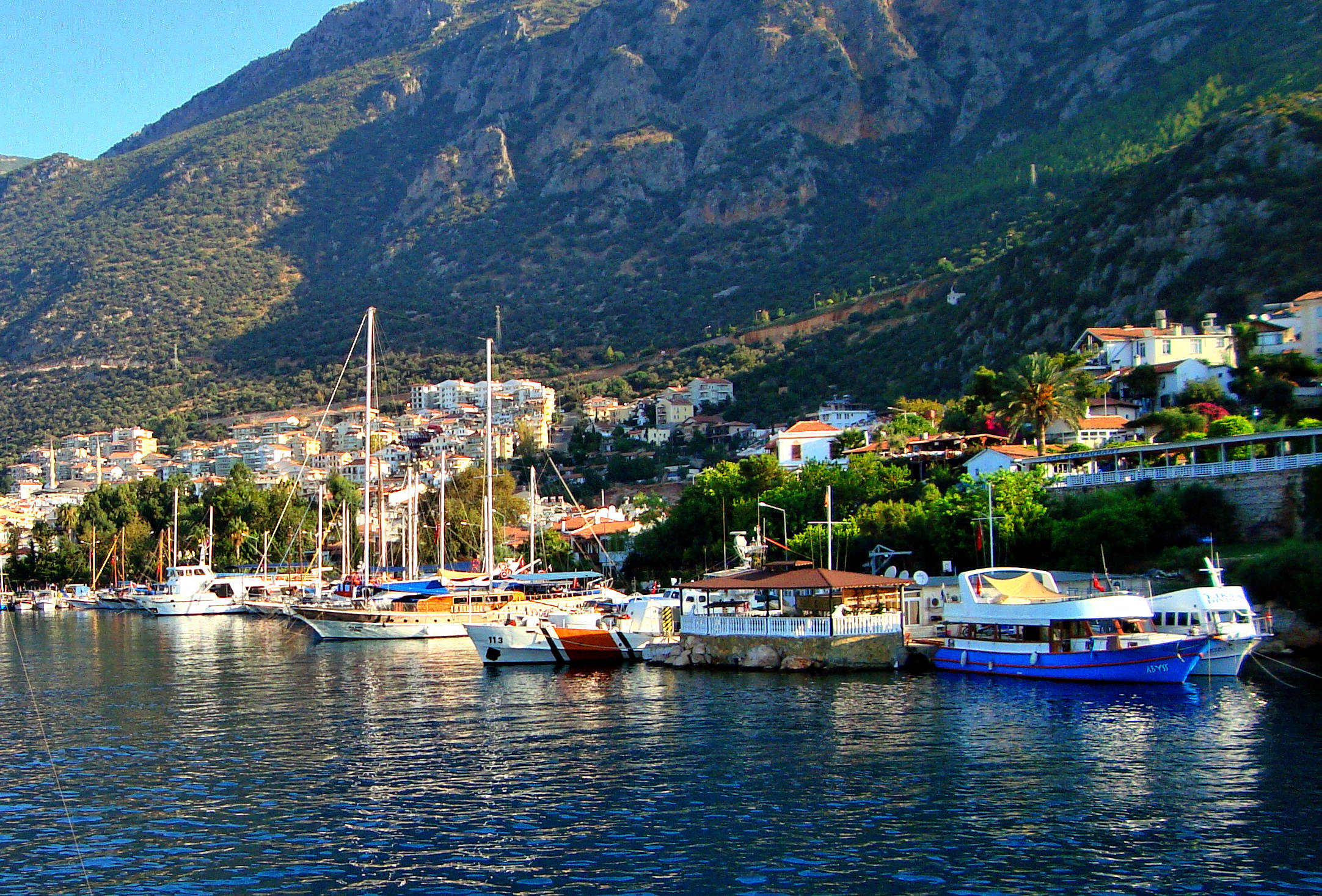
Old Town of Kaş

The tourist industry is centered on the town of Kaş, but many other coastal towns and villages in the district have plenty of accommodation for visitors including Kalkan and Gelemiş. The district can be reached from both Antalya and Dalaman airports, as there is no airport in Kaş.

Kaş itself is a town with its turquoise blue sea and narrow streets scented with jasmine flowers. Kaş has an annual arts festival, jazz concerts in the Hellenistic theatre and the Kiln Under the Sea arts collective have held underwater ceramics exhibitions here.

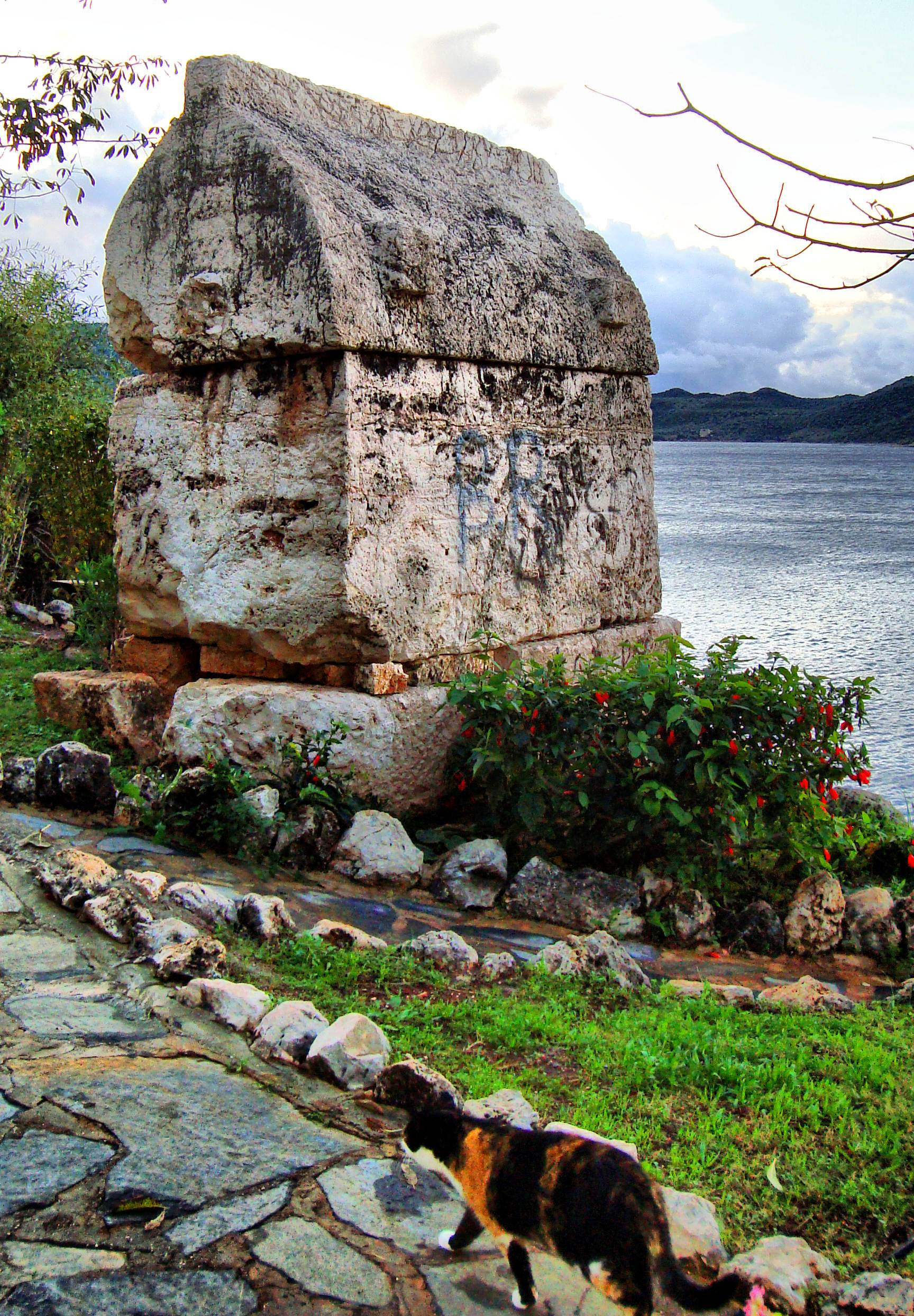
Ancient Lycian tomb in Kaş

Kaş is one of the leading spots for scuba diving in Turkey. Its visited by beginners as well as advanced divers. There are more than 15 dive centers and diving schools, mostly located at the local port. They offer guided diving trips to the 50 dive spots in the vicinity. Diving in Kaş offers an array of fish and other sea creatures like octopus and sea turtles.

Besides the biological diversity, Kaş offers a vast variety of underwater cultural heritage. Among various wreck sites, six artificial wrecks are worth visiting. These wrecks are submerged to create artificial reefs and touristic diving spots. There are two historically important wreck sites, an airplane from World War II and a cargo ship from the 1950s sunk near the small islands in the extremities of Kaş. One last important diving spot is the "Kaş Archaeopark Site", an experimental archaeology project conducted by the Underwater Research Society (Sualtı Araştırmaları Derneği-SAD) in 2006. In this scientific project, an interpretative reconstruction of the Uluburun wreck and its cargo is placed underwater.

Outdoor sport activities attract the more adventurous visitors of Kaş, especially small group holidays from Europe and independent travellers. Popular adventures include:

- Sea Kayaking at Kekova
- Mountainbiking the backcountry
- Trekking the Lycian Way
- Canyoning in the Kibris Canyon

On Fridays, Greek visitors from Kastelorizo visit the markets of Kaş, including the central city market full local products and produce grown in the surrounding villages.

== Demographics ==
The district has a population of 62,866 (2022). The town itself has 9,084 inhabitants. Other larger settlements are Kınık and Ova.

== Places of interest ==
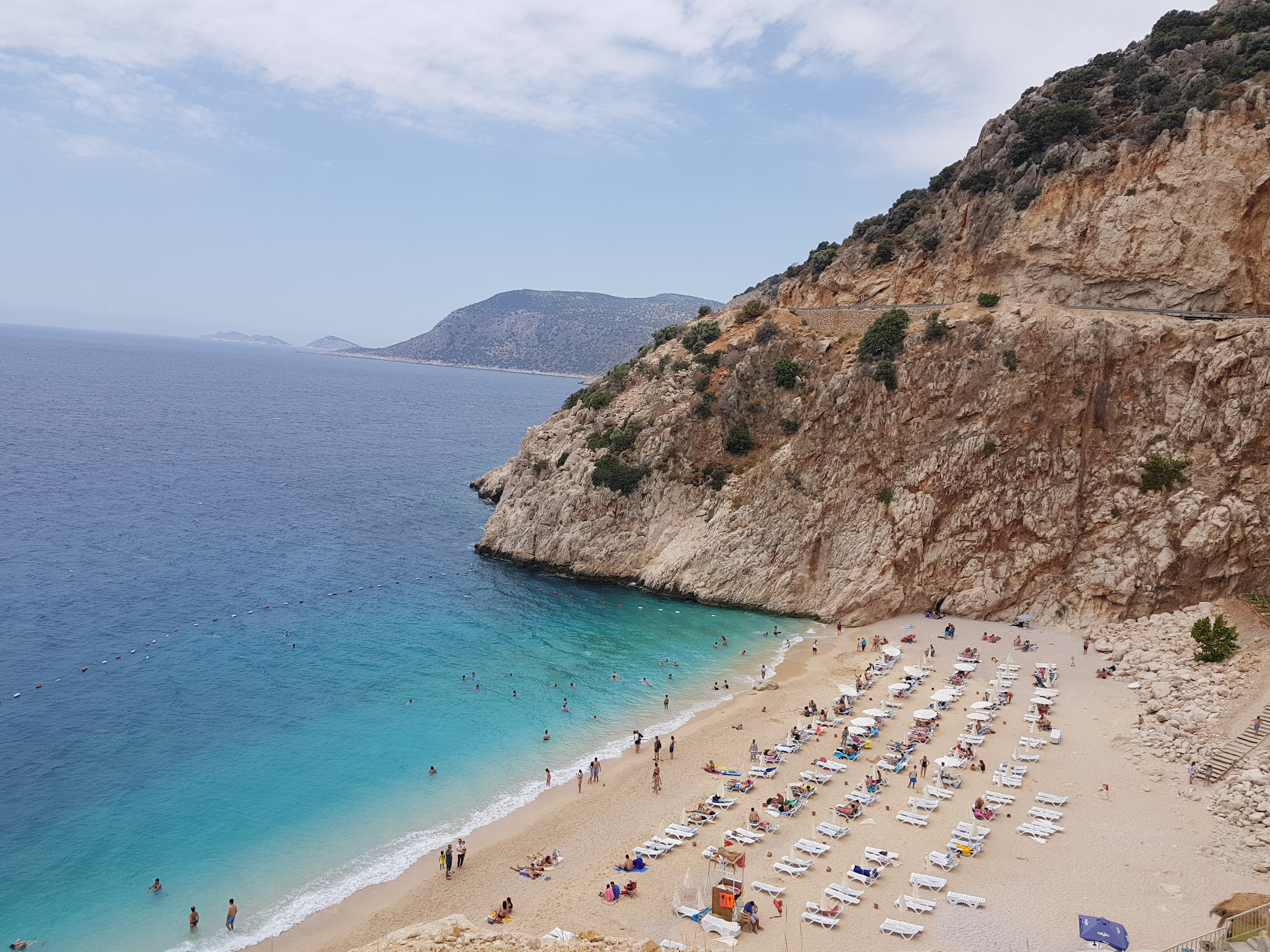
Kaputaş Beach in Kaş

- The town of Kaş has a Hellenistic theatre and many other places of historical interest, as well as beaches, and a number of caves, some of them underwater.
- For scuba divers there are several spots underwater, one of them being an underwater sculpture of a shark sculpted by Kemal Tufan and another being a submerged Douglas DC-3 plane.
- Beaches worth visiting: Kaputaş Plajı, small Seyrekcakil Plaji or Belediyesi Halk Plajı
- The ruins of the antique cities of Komba (in the village of Gömbe), Nisa, Kandyba, Phellos, Istlada, Apollonia, Isinda and Kyaenai.
- A common excursion from Kaş is Kekova island in the neighbouring district of Demre. Here in the bays there are a number of wrecks of ancient ships and ancient cities sunk under the sea by earthquakes over the centuries. The sea is so clear that the details of city buildings such as staircases or columns can be seen from the boat. The area is also used for sea kayaking. In December 2006, Kaş was added to the specially protected Kekova marine area in order to preserve its rich biodiversity.

== Gallery ==
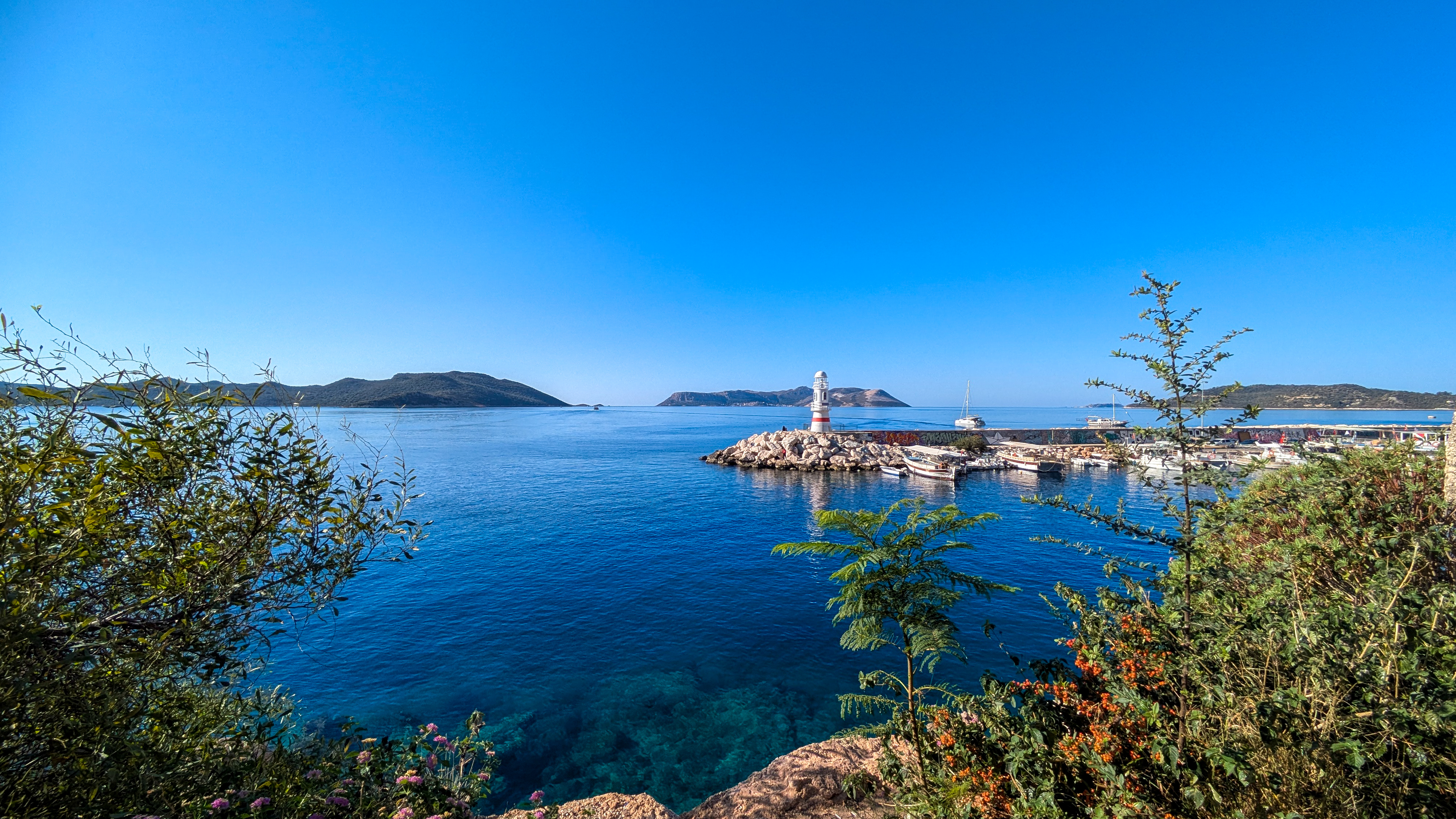

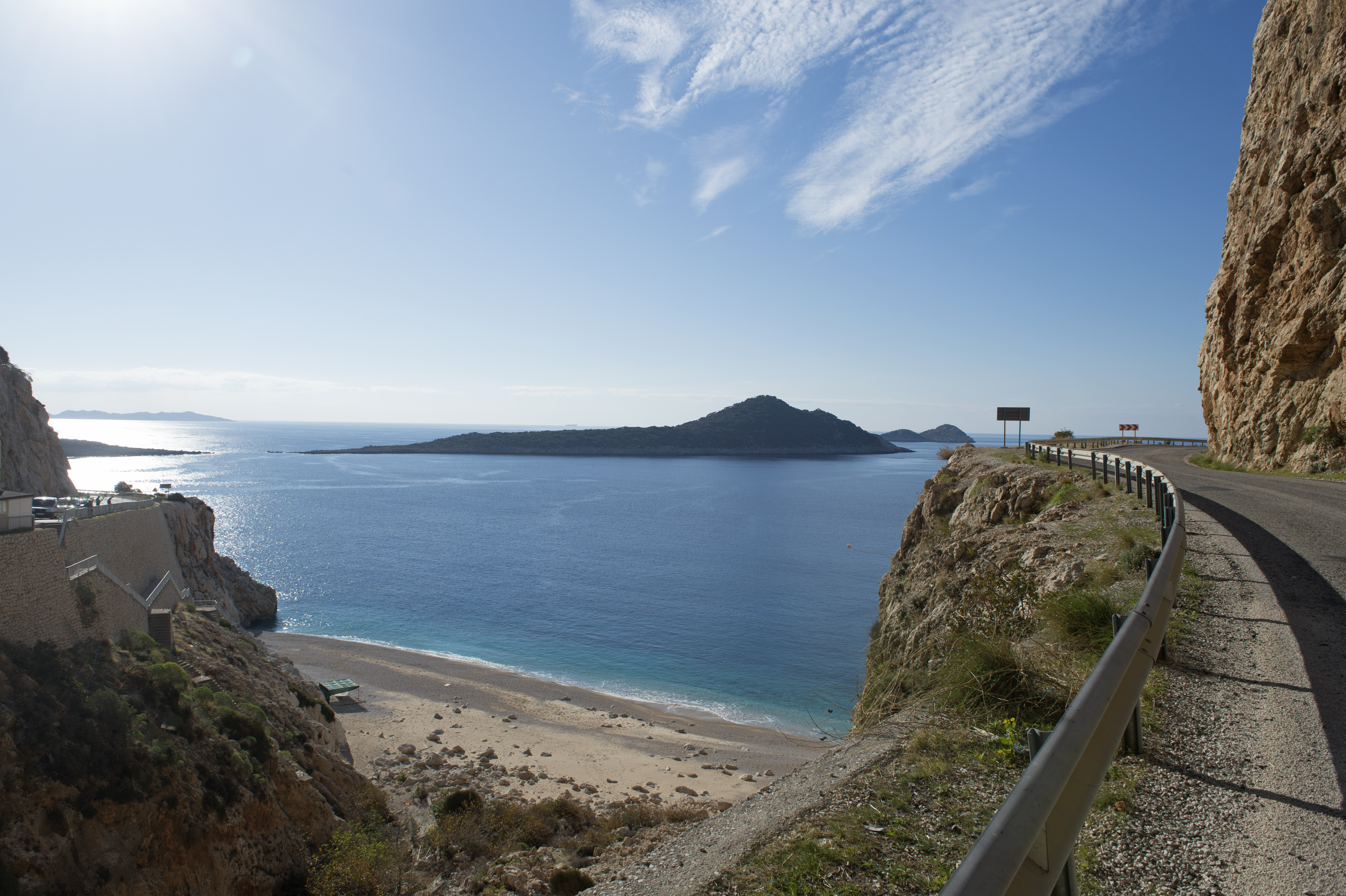

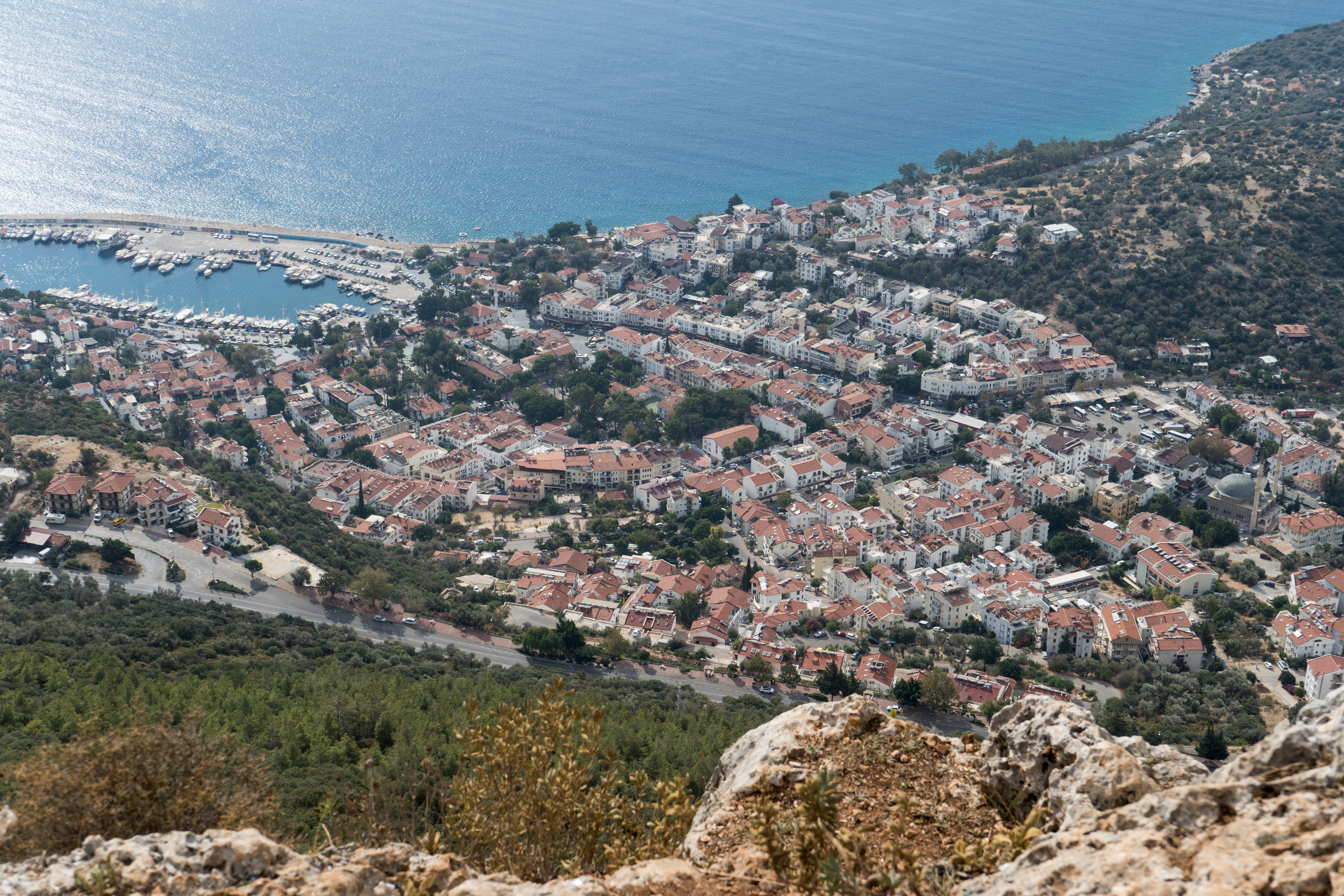

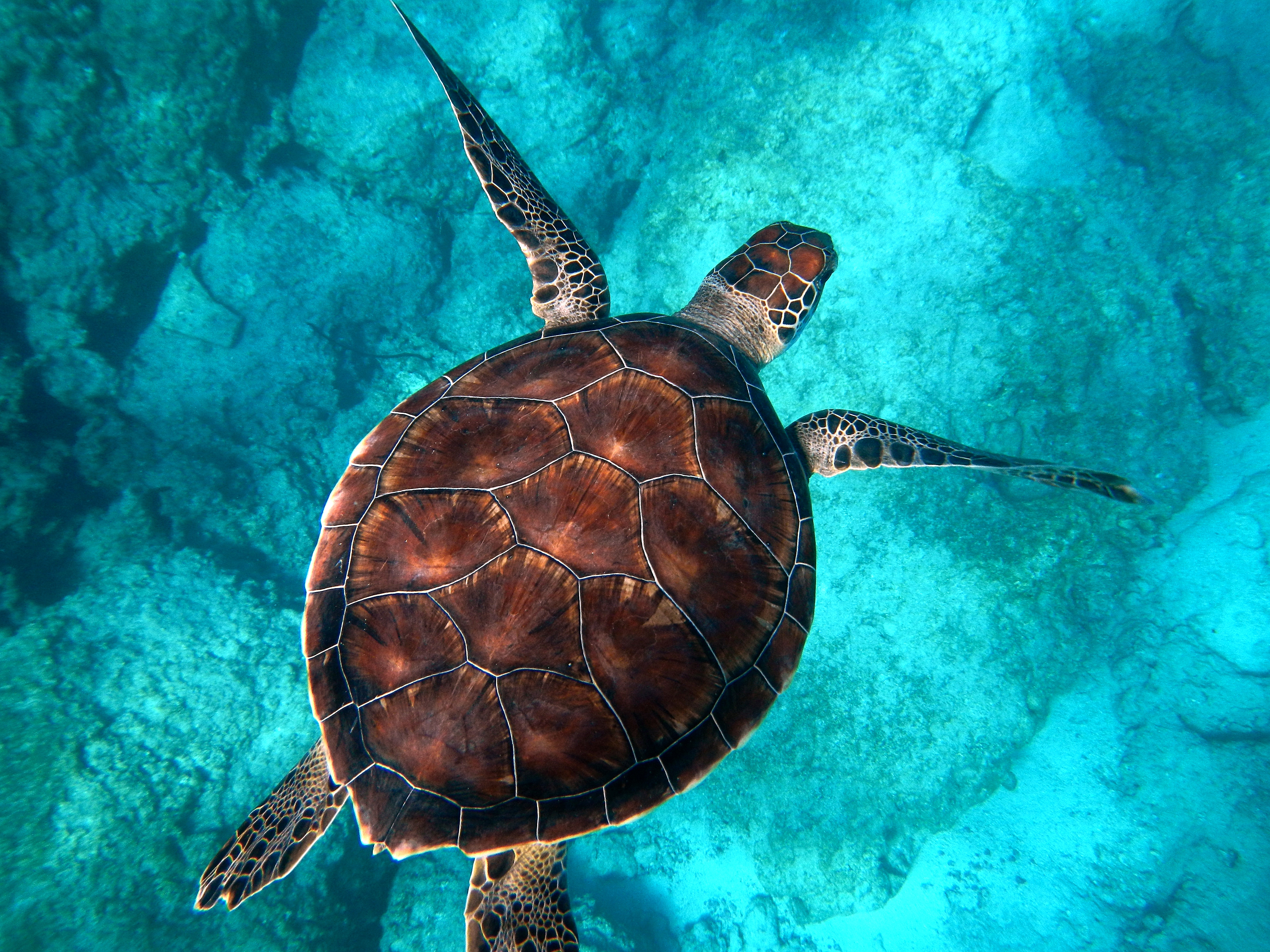

== See also ==
- Kaputaş Beach
- Kalkan
- Turkish Riviera
- Foreign purchases of real estate in Turkey
- Meis–Kaş Swim

== Sources ==
- Hazlitt, William (1851). The Classical Gazetteer: A Dictionary of Ancient geography Sacred & Profane. Whittaker, London.
- Bertarelli, L.V. (1929). Guida d'Italia, Vol. XVII (in Italian). Milano: Consociazione Turistica Italiana.
