= Bayırlı =

Bayırlı (literally "place with hill(s)") is a Turkish place name and may refer to the following places in Turkey:

- Bayırlı, Hasankeyf, a village in Hasankeyf district, Batman Province
- Bayırlı, Lice
- Bayırlı, Samsat, a village in Samsat district, Adıyaman Province
- Bayırlı, Sındırgı, a village
- Bayırlı, Suluova, a village in Suluova district, Amasya Province

== See also ==
- Bayır (disambiguation), literally "hill"
- Bayırköy (disambiguation), literally "hill village"
