= Küçüksöğle, Elmalı =

Küçüksöğle
- Neighbourhood
- Location in Turkey
- Coordinates: 36°41′N 30°00′E
- Country: Turkey
- Province: Antalya
- District: Elmalı
- Population (2022): 225
- Time zone: UTC+3 (TRT)

Küçüksöğle is a neighbourhood in the municipality and district of Elmalı, Antalya Province, Turkey. Its population is 225 (2022). May have been the place of the antique Lycian (actually Milyas) town of Soklai
