= Isba =

City on the border of ancient Pamphylia

Coordinates: 36°23′20″N 29°44′14″E

Isba was a city on the border of ancient Pamphylia. It has been identified with the modern village of Çeşme.

Isba became a Christian bishopric, a suffragan of the metropolitan see of Side, the capital of the Roman province of Pamphylia Prima, to which Isba belonged. No longer a residential bishopric, Isba is today listed by the Catholic Church as a titular see.

Among the titular bishops of the see was Lionel Scheffer (14 March 1946 – 3 October 1966), later Vicar Apostolic of Labrador, after whom Schefferville, Quebec is named.
