= Yeşilköy, Kaş =

Yeşilköy
- Neighbourhood
- Location in Turkey
- Coordinates: 36°16′59″N 29°22′33″E
- Country: Turkey
- Province: Antalya
- District: Kaş
- Population (2022): 3,925
- Time zone: UTC+3 (TRT)

Yeşilköy is a neighbourhood of the municipality and district of Kaş, Antalya Province, Turkey. Its population is 3,925 (2022). Before the 2013 reorganisation, it was a town (belde).
