= Gökçeyazı, Kaş =

Gökçeyazı
- Neighbourhood
- Location in Turkey
- Coordinates: 36.2919°N 29.8006°E
- Country: Turkey
- Province: Antalya
- District: Kaş
- Population (2022): 110
- Time zone: UTC+3 (TRT)

Gökçeyazı is a neighbourhood in the municipality and district of Kaş, Antalya Province, Turkey. Its population is 110 (2022).
