= Boğazcık, Kaş =

Boğazcık
- Neighbourhood
- Location in Turkey
- Coordinates: 36.1963°N 29.7536°E
- Country: Turkey
- Province: Antalya
- District: Kaş
- Population (2022): 224
- Time zone: UTC+3 (TRT)

Boğazcık is a neighbourhood in the municipality and district of Kaş, Antalya Province, Turkey. Its population is 224 (2022).
