= Sarıbelen, Kaş =

Sarıbelen
- Neighbourhood
- Location in Turkey
- Coordinates: 36°16′N 29°29′E
- Country: Turkey
- Province: Antalya
- District: Kaş
- Population (2022): 1,085
- Time zone: UTC+3 (TRT)

Sarıbelen is a neighbourhood in the municipality and district of Kaş, Antalya Province, Turkey. Its population is 1,085 (2022).
