= Kızılağaç, Kaş =

Kızılağaç
- Neighbourhood
- Country: Turkey
- Province: Antalya
- District: Kaş
- Population (2022): 221
- Time zone: UTC+3 (TRT)

Kızılağaç is a neighbourhood in the municipality and district of Kaş, Antalya Province, Turkey. Its population is 221 (2022).
