= Çayköy, Kaş =

Çayköy
- Neighbourhood
- Location in Turkey
- Coordinates: 36.3417°N 29.3874°E
- Country: Turkey
- Province: Antalya
- District: Kaş
- Population (2022): 1,519
- Time zone: UTC+3 (TRT)

Çayköy is a neighbourhood in the municipality and district of Kaş, Antalya Province, Turkey. Its population is 1,519 (2022).
