= Pınarbaşı, Kaş =

Pınarbaşı
- Neighbourhood
- Location in Turkey
- Coordinates: 36.2394°N 29.6698°E
- Country: Turkey
- Province: Antalya
- District: Kaş
- Population (2022): 212
- Time zone: UTC+3 (TRT)

Pınarbaşı is a neighbourhood in the municipality and district of Kaş, Antalya Province, Turkey. Its population is 212 (2022).
