= Akörü, Kaş =

Akörü
- Neighbourhood
- Location in Turkey
- Coordinates: 36°22′N 29°39′E
- Country: Turkey
- Province: Antalya
- District: Kaş
- Population (2022): 405
- Time zone: UTC+3 (TRT)

Akörü is a neighbourhood in the municipality and district of Kaş, Antalya Province, Turkey. Its population is 405 (2022).
