= Kınık, Kaş =

Kınık
- Neighbourhood
- Location in Turkey
- Coordinates: 36°21′09″N 29°19′14″E
- Country: Turkey
- Province: Antalya
- District: Kaş
- Population (2022): 6,120
- Time zone: UTC+3 (TRT)

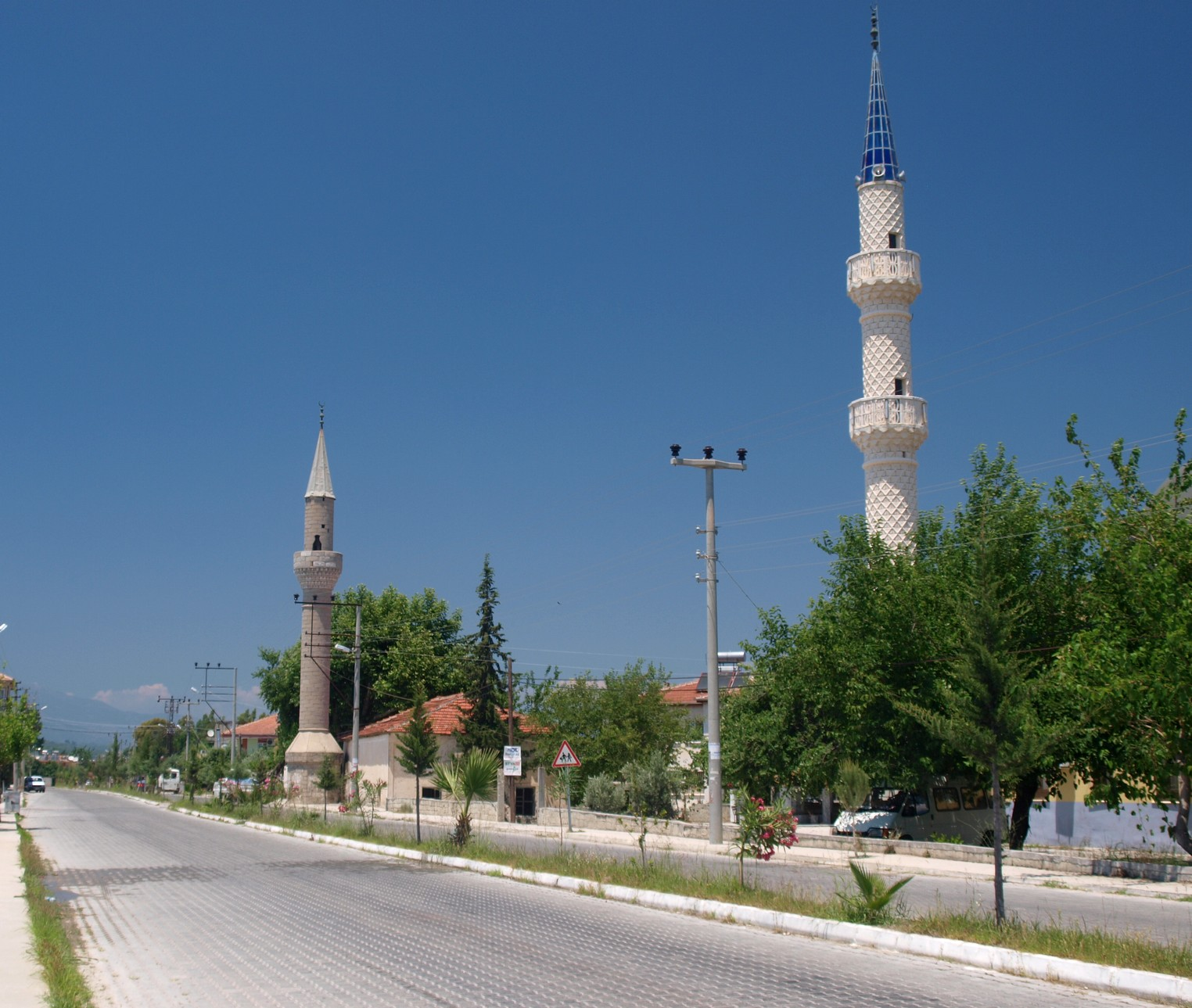
Kınık Kaş, Antalya, Turkey

Kınık is a neighbourhood of the municipality and district of Kaş, Antalya Province, Turkey. Its population is 6,120 (2022). Before the 2013 reorganisation, it was a town (belde).
