= Hacıoğlan, Kaş =

Hacıoğlan
- Neighbourhood
- Location in Turkey
- Coordinates: 36.2654°N 29.4915°E
- Country: Turkey
- Province: Antalya
- District: Kaş
- Population (2022): 299
- Time zone: UTC+3 (TRT)

Hacıoğlan is a neighbourhood in the municipality and district of Kaş, Antalya Province, Turkey. Its population is 299 (2022).
