= Kasaba, Kaş =

Kasaba
- Neighbourhood
- Location in Turkey
- Coordinates: 36.3113°N 29.7338°E
- Country: Turkey
- Province: Antalya
- District: Kaş
- Population (2022): 1,581
- Time zone: UTC+3 (TRT)

Kasaba is a neighbourhood in the municipality and district of Kaş, Antalya Province, Turkey. Its population is 1,581 (2022).
