= Gölova, Elmalı =

Gölova
- Neighbourhood
- Location in Turkey
- Coordinates: 36.7992°N 30.0389°E
- Country: Turkey
- Province: Antalya
- District: Elmalı
- Population (2022): 649
- Time zone: UTC+3 (TRT)

Gölova (formerly: Müren) is a neighbourhood in the municipality and district of Elmalı, Antalya Province, Turkey. Its population is 649 (2022).
