= Ortabağ, Kaş =

Ortabağ
- Neighbourhood
- Location in Turkey
- Coordinates: 36.4363°N 29.7799°E
- Country: Turkey
- Province: Antalya
- District: Kaş
- Population (2022): 212
- Time zone: UTC+3 (TRT)

Ortabağ is a neighbourhood in the municipality and district of Kaş, Antalya Province, Turkey. Its population is 212 (2022).
