= Palamutköy, Kaş =

Palamutköy
- Neighbourhood
- Country: Turkey
- Province: Antalya
- District: Kaş
- Population (2022): 1,177
- Time zone: UTC+3 (TRT)

Palamutköy is a neighbourhood in the municipality and district of Kaş, Antalya Province, Turkey. Its population is 1,177 (2022).
