= Yeniköy, Kaş =

Yeniköy
- Neighbourhood
- Location in Turkey
- Coordinates: 36.2251°N 29.5975°E
- Country: Turkey
- Province: Antalya
- District: Kaş
- Population (2022): 131
- Time zone: UTC+3 (TRT)

Yeniköy is a neighbourhood in the municipality and district of Kaş, Antalya Province, Turkey. Its population is 131 (2022).
