= Yaylapalamut, Kaş =

Yaylapalamut
- Neighbourhood
- Location in Turkey
- Coordinates: 36°27′N 29°31′E
- Country: Turkey
- Province: Antalya
- District: Kaş
- Population (2022): 234
- Time zone: UTC+3 (TRT)

Yaylapalamut is a neighbourhood in the municipality and district of Kaş, Antalya Province, Turkey. Its population is 234 (2022).
