= Sarılar, Kaş =

Sarılar
- Neighbourhood
- Location in Turkey
- Coordinates: 36.2667°N 29.7651°E
- Country: Turkey
- Province: Antalya
- District: Kaş
- Population (2022): 200
- Time zone: UTC+3 (TRT)

Sarılar is a neighbourhood in the municipality and district of Kaş, Antalya Province, Turkey. Its population is 200 (2022).
