= Belkonak, Kaş =

Belkonak
- Neighbourhood
- Location in Turkey
- Coordinates: 36°18′N 29°47′E
- Country: Turkey
- Province: Antalya
- District: Kaş
- Population (2022): 42
- Time zone: UTC+3 (TRT)

Belkonak is a neighbourhood in the municipality and district of Kaş, Antalya Province, Turkey. Its population is 42 (2022).
