= Soklai =

Soklai (Ancient Greek: Σόκλαι), or Sokla (Σόκλα), was a town of ancient Lycia, which per the Stadiasmus Patarensis was on a road from Acarassus, and another from Podalia.

Its site is unlocated.
