= Bezirgan, Kaş =

Bezirgan
- Neighbourhood
- Location in Turkey
- Coordinates: 36.2750°N 29.4597°E
- Country: Turkey
- Province: Antalya
- District: Kaş
- Population (2022): 2,180
- Time zone: UTC+3 (TRT)

Bezirgan is a neighbourhood in the municipality and district of Kaş, Antalya Province, Turkey. Its population is 2,180 (2022).
