= Gömbe, Kaş =

Gömbe
- Neighbourhood
- Location in Turkey
- Coordinates: 36°33′N 29°40′E
- Country: Turkey
- Province: Antalya
- District: Kaş
- Population (2022): 1,260
- Time zone: UTC+3 (TRT)

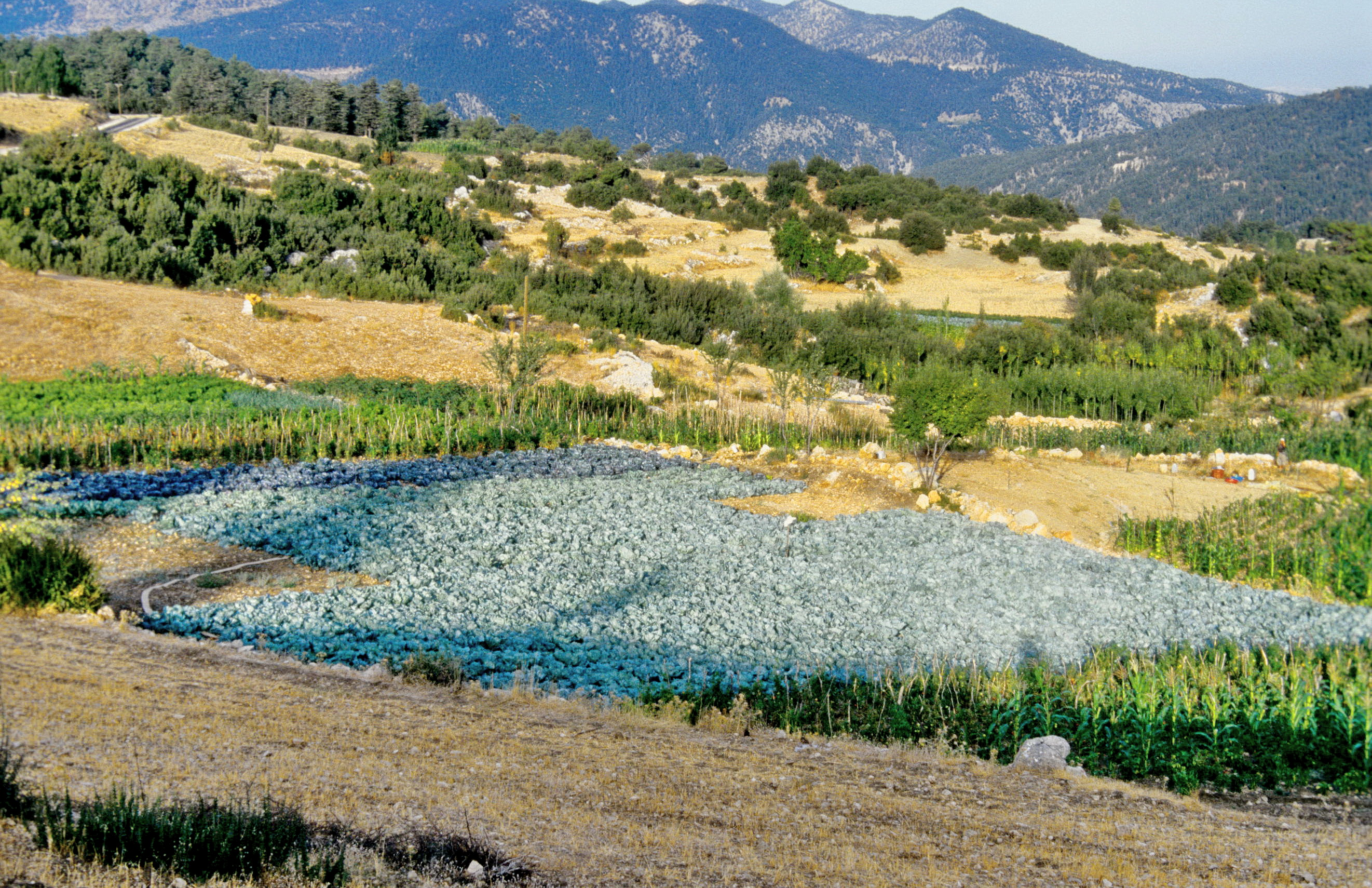

Gömbe is a neighbourhood of the municipality and district of Kaş, Antalya Province, Turkey. Its population is 1,260 (2022). Before the 2013 reorganisation, it was a town (belde).
