= Istlada =

Ancient Lycian town

Coordinates: 36°13′06″N 29°53′16″E

Istlada was a town of ancient Lycia; the name is known only from inscriptions and is uncertain because the end of the inscription has been lost.

Its site is located near Hayıtlı, Asiatic Turkey, where remains, including Lycian tombs of the 4th century BCE, can be found. The site is part of the tentative UNESCO World Heritage Site called 'Ancient Cities of Lycian Civilisation'.
