= Yuvacık, Kaş =

Yuvacık
- Neighbourhood
- Location in Turkey
- Coordinates: 36.4322°N 29.5605°E
- Country: Turkey
- Province: Antalya
- District: Kaş
- Population (2022): 276
- Time zone: UTC+3 (TRT)

Yuvacık is a neighbourhood in the municipality and district of Kaş, Antalya Province, Turkey. Its population is 276 (2022).
