= Ova, Kaş =

Ova
- Neighbourhood
- Location in Turkey
- Coordinates: 36.3160°N 29.3266°E
- Country: Turkey
- Province: Antalya
- District: Kaş
- Population (2022): 5,780
- Time zone: UTC+3 (TRT)

Ova is a neighbourhood of the municipality and district of Kaş, Antalya Province, Turkey. Its population is 5,780 (2022). Before the 2013 reorganisation, it was a town (belde).
