= Beldibi, Kaş =

Beldibi
- Neighbourhood
- Location in Turkey
- Coordinates: 36.4348°N 29.6200°E
- Country: Turkey
- Province: Antalya
- District: Kaş
- Population (2022): 254
- Time zone: UTC+3 (TRT)

Beldibi is a neighbourhood in the municipality and district of Kaş, Antalya Province, Turkey. Its population is 254 (2022).
