= Aklar, Kaş =

Aklar
- Neighbourhood
- Location in Turkey
- Coordinates: 36.3975°N 29.3821°E
- Country: Turkey
- Province: Antalya
- District: Kaş
- Population (2022): 368
- Time zone: UTC+3 (TRT)

Aklar is a neighbourhood in the municipality and district of Kaş, Antalya Province, Turkey. Its population is 368 (2022).
