= İkizce, Kaş =

İkizce
- Neighbourhood
- Location in Turkey
- Coordinates: 36.3186°N 29.4703°E
- Country: Turkey
- Province: Antalya
- District: Kaş
- Population (2022): 190
- Time zone: UTC+3 (TRT)

İkizce is a neighbourhood in the municipality and district of Kaş, Antalya Province, Turkey. Its population is 190 (2022).
