= Çavdır, Kaş =

Çavdır
- Neighbourhood
- Location in Turkey
- Coordinates: 36.3661°N 29.3519°E
- Country: Turkey
- Province: Antalya
- District: Kaş
- Population (2022): 3,830
- Time zone: UTC+3 (TRT)

Çavdır is a neighbourhood in the municipality and district of Kaş, Antalya Province, Turkey. Its population is 3,830 (2022).
