= Çamlıova, Kaş =

Çamlıova
- Neighbourhood
- Location in Turkey
- Coordinates: 36°24′N 29°29′E
- Country: Turkey
- Province: Antalya
- District: Kaş
- Population (2022): 189
- Time zone: UTC+3 (TRT)

Çamlıova is a neighbourhood in the municipality and district of Kaş, Antalya Province, Turkey. Its population is 189 (2022).
