= Dereköy, Kaş =

Dereköy
- Neighbourhood
- Location in Turkey
- Coordinates: 36.2674°N 29.6478°E
- Country: Turkey
- Province: Antalya
- District: Kaş
- Population (2022): 184
- Time zone: UTC+3 (TRT)

Dereköy is a neighbourhood in the municipality and district of Kaş, Antalya Province, Turkey. Its population is 184 (2022).
