= Kılıçlı, Kaş =

Kılıçlı
- Neighbourhood
- Location in Turkey
- Coordinates: 36°11′36″N 29°46′14″E
- Country: Turkey
- Province: Antalya
- District: Kaş
- Population (2022): 243
- Time zone: UTC+3 (TRT)

Kılıçlı (also: Sahilkılıçlı or Sahilkılınçlı) is a neighbourhood in the municipality and district of Kaş, Antalya Province, Turkey. Its population is 243 (2022).
