= Söbüce, Korkuteli =

Söbüce
- Village
- Location in Turkey
- Coordinates: 37°17′1″N 30°5′1″E
- Country: Turkey
- Province: Antalya
- District: Korkuteli

Population (2007)
  - Total: 214
- Time zone: UTC+3 (TRT)

Söbüce is a mountain settlement (yayla) in the District of Korkuteli, Antalya Province, Turkey. Its population was 214 in 2007.

The village is 110 km away from Antalya city center, and 90 km away from Döşemealtı.

== Economy ==
The economy of Söbüce is largely agrarian. Animal breeding is also popular within the village.

== Infrastructure ==
There is no primary school in the village. There is a drinking water network, however there is no sewerage. Hospitals and doctors offices are completely absent. The road that provides access to the neighborhood is asphalt. There are no telephone lines.
