= Kılıçlıyayla, Kaş =

Kılıçlıyayla
- Neighbourhood
- Location in Turkey
- Coordinates: 36°34′19″N 29°42′03″E
- Country: Turkey
- Province: Antalya
- District: Kaş
- Population (2022): 322
- Time zone: UTC+3 (TRT)

Kılıçlıyayla (also: Yaylakılıçlı or Yaylakılınçlı) is a neighbourhood in the municipality and district of Kaş, Antalya Province, Turkey. Its population is 322 (2022).
