= İslamlar, Kaş =

İslamlar
- Neighbourhood
- Location in Turkey
- Coordinates: 36.3132°N 29.4220°E
- Country: Turkey
- Province: Antalya
- District: Kaş
- Population (2022): 2,789
- Time zone: UTC+3 (TRT)

İslamlar is a neighbourhood in the municipality and district of Kaş, Antalya Province, Turkey. Its population is 2,789 (2022).
