= Dirgenler, Kaş =

Dirgenler
- Neighbourhood
- Location in Turkey
- Coordinates: 36°21′N 29°48′E
- Country: Turkey
- Province: Antalya
- District: Kaş
- Population (2022): 990
- Time zone: UTC+3 (TRT)

Dirgenler is a neighbourhood in the municipality and district of Kaş, Antalya Province, Turkey. Its population is 990 (2022).
