= Cemre, Kaş =

Cemre
- Neighbourhood
- Location in Turkey
- Coordinates: 36°31′N 29°40′E
- Country: Turkey
- Province: Antalya
- District: Kaş
- Population (2022): 275
- Time zone: UTC+3 (TRT)

Cemre is a neighbourhood in the municipality and district of Kaş, Antalya Province, Turkey. Its population is 275 (2022).
