= Uğrar, Kaş =

Uğrar
- Neighbourhood
- Location in Turkey
- Coordinates: 36°17′N 29°42′E
- Country: Turkey
- Province: Antalya
- District: Kaş
- Population (2022): 888
- Time zone: UTC+3 (TRT)

Uğrar is a neighbourhood in the municipality and district of Kaş, Antalya Province, Turkey. Its population is 888 (2022).
