= Burçaklar, Alanya =

Burçaklar
- Neighbourhood
- Location in Turkey
- Coordinates: 36.6780°N 31.8951°E
- Country: Turkey
- Province: Antalya
- District: Alanya
- Population (2022): 301
- Time zone: UTC+3 (TRT)

Burçaklar is a neighbourhood in the municipality and district of Alanya, Antalya Province, Turkey. Its population is 301 (2022). It is located between Alanya and Gündoğmuş. In 2001 it passed from the Gündoğmuş District to the Alanya District.
