= Ağullu, Kaş =

Ağullu
- Neighbourhood
- Location in Turkey
- Coordinates: 36.2143°N 29.6820°E
- Country: Turkey
- Province: Antalya
- District: Kaş
- Population (2022): 1,123
- Time zone: UTC+3 (TRT)

Ağullu (also: Ağıllı) is a neighbourhood in the municipality and district of Kaş, Antalya Province, Turkey. Its population is 1,123 (2022).
