= Doğantaş, Kaş =

Doğantaş
- Neighbourhood
- Location in Turkey
- Coordinates: 36°26′24″N 29°50′24″E
- Country: Turkey
- Province: Antalya
- District: Kaş
- Population (2022): 627
- Time zone: UTC+3 (TRT)

Doğantaş is a neighbourhood in the municipality and district of Kaş, Antalya Province, Turkey. Its population is 627 (2022).
