= Bademağacı, Alanya =

Bademağacı
- Neighbourhood
- Location in Turkey
- Coordinates: 36.6159°N 32.0923°E
- Country: Turkey
- Province: Antalya
- District: Alanya
- Population (2022): 435
- Time zone: UTC+3 (TRT)

Bademağacı is a neighbourhood in the municipality and district of Alanya, Antalya Province, Turkey. Its population is 435 (2022).

== Coğrafya ==
Antalya iline 159 km, Alanya ilçesine 19 km uzaklıktadır.
