= Kemerköy, Kaş =

Kemerköy
- Neighbourhood
- Location in Turkey
- Coordinates: 36.3565°N 29.7131°E
- Country: Turkey
- Province: Antalya
- District: Kaş
- Population (2022): 550
- Time zone: UTC+3 (TRT)

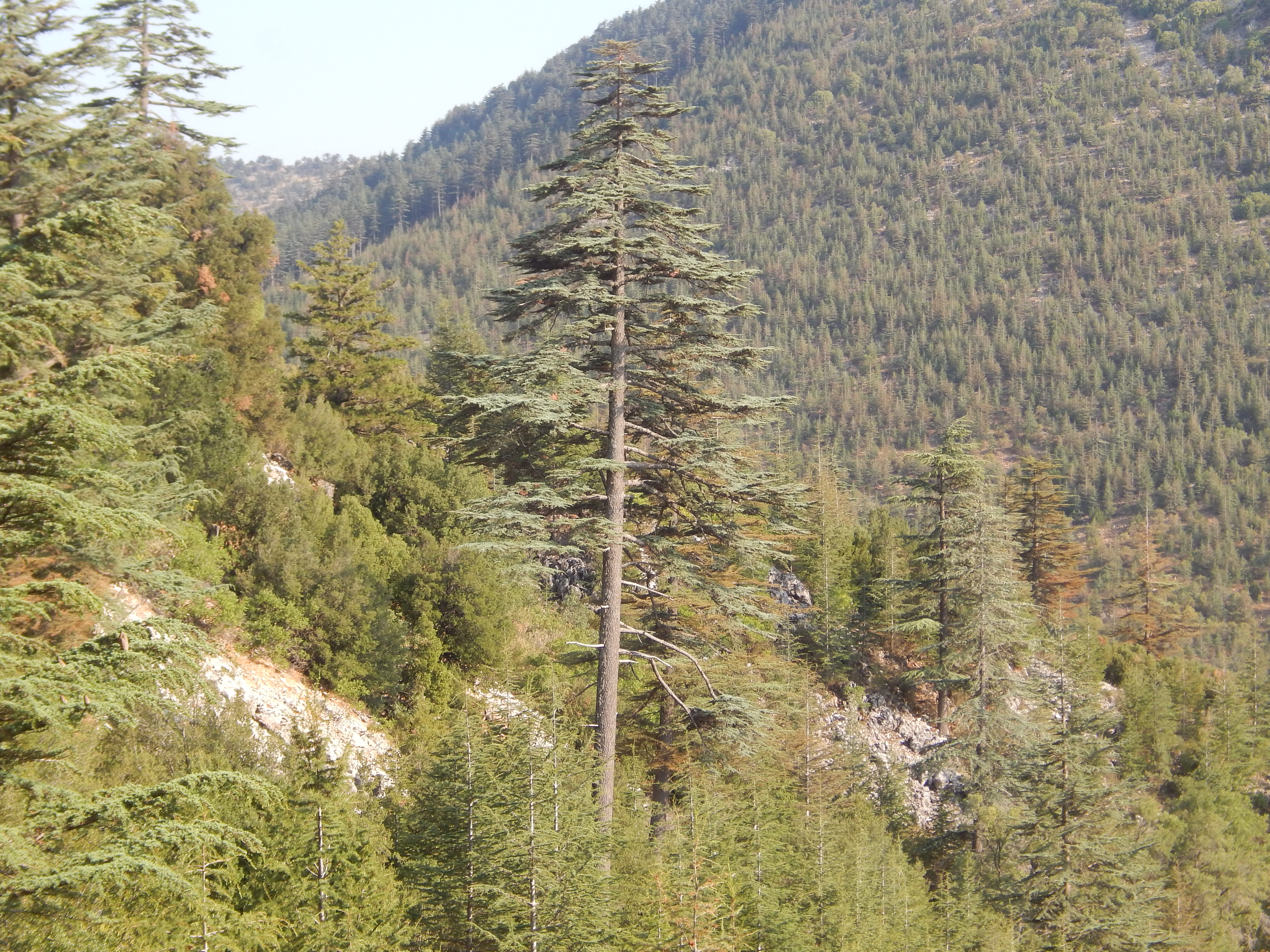

Kemerköy is a neighbourhood in the municipality and district of Kaş, Antalya Province, Turkey. Its population is 550 (2022).
