= Çerler, Kaş =

Çerler
- Neighbourhood
- Location in Turkey
- Coordinates: 36°17′N 29°47′E
- Country: Turkey
- Province: Antalya
- District: Kaş
- Population (2022): 88
- Time zone: UTC+3 (TRT)

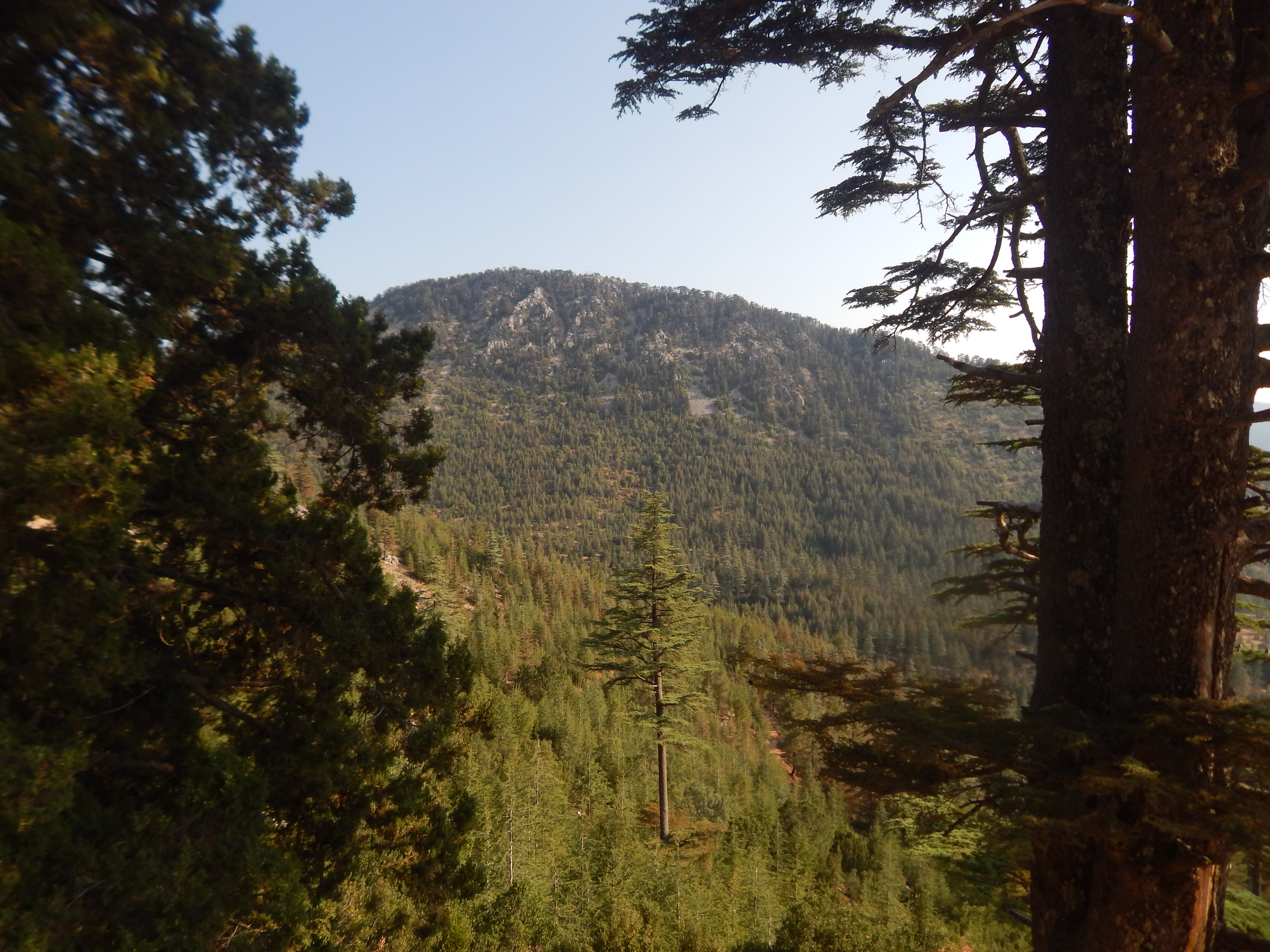
Mountain near Çerler

Çerler is a neighbourhood in the municipality and district of Kaş, Antalya Province, Turkey. Its population is 88 (2022).
