= Bayırkozağacı, Alanya =

Bayırkozağacı
- Neighbourhood
- Location in Turkey
- Coordinates: 36°42′26″N 31°58′54″E
- Country: Turkey
- Province: Antalya
- District: Alanya
- Population (2022): 133
- Time zone: UTC+3 (TRT)

Bayırkozağacı is a neighbourhood in the municipality and district of Alanya, Antalya Province, Turkey. Its population is 133 (2022). In 2001 it passed from the Gündoğmuş District to the Alanya District.
