= Ahatlı, Kaş =

Ahatlı
- Neighbourhood
- Location in Turkey
- Coordinates: 36.2658°N 29.7381°E
- Country: Turkey
- Province: Antalya
- District: Kaş
- Population (2022): 255
- Time zone: UTC+3 (TRT)

Ahatlı is a neighbourhood in the municipality and district of Kaş, Antalya Province, Turkey. Its population is 255 (2022). It is 175 km distant from Antalya city center and 15 km to Kaş, both important centers of tourism in Turkey.
