= Yeşilbarak, Kaş =

Yeşilbarak
- Neighbourhood
- Location in Turkey
- Coordinates: 36°35′N 29°41′E
- Country: Turkey
- Province: Antalya
- District: Kaş
- Population (2022): 511
- Time zone: UTC+3 (TRT)

Yeşilbarak is a neighbourhood in the municipality and district of Kaş, Antalya Province, Turkey. Its population is 511 (2022).
