= Üzümlü, Kaş =

Üzümlü
- Neighbourhood
- Location in Turkey
- Coordinates: 36.3167°N 29.3989°E
- Country: Turkey
- Province: Antalya
- District: Kaş
- Population (2022): 1,410
- Time zone: UTC+3 (TRT)

Üzümlü is a neighbourhood in the municipality and district of Kaş, Antalya Province, Turkey. Its population is 1,410 (2022).
