= Karadağ, Kaş =

Karadağ
- Neighbourhood
- Location in Turkey
- Coordinates: 36.3792°N 29.8656°E
- Country: Turkey
- Province: Antalya
- District: Kaş
- Population (2022): 1,246
- Time zone: UTC+3 (TRT)

Karadağ is a neighbourhood in the municipality and district of Kaş, Antalya Province, Turkey. Its population is 1,246 (2022).
