= Gürsu, Kaş =

Gürsu
- Neighbourhood
- Country: Turkey
- Province: Antalya
- District: Kaş
- Population (2022): 219
- Time zone: UTC+3 (TRT)

Gürsu is a neighbourhood in the municipality and district of Kaş, Antalya Province, Turkey. Its population is 219 (2022).
