= Sinneli, Kaş =

Sinneli
- Neighbourhood
- Location in Turkey
- Coordinates: 36°19′N 29°38′E
- Country: Turkey
- Province: Antalya
- District: Kaş
- Population (2022): 129
- Time zone: UTC+3 (TRT)

Sinneli is a neighbourhood in the municipality and district of Kaş, Antalya Province, Turkey. Its population is 129 (2022).
