= İmircik, Elmalı =

İmircik
- Neighbourhood
- Country: Turkey
- Province: Antalya
- District: Elmalı
- Population (2022): 121
- Time zone: UTC+3 (TRT)

İmircik is a neighbourhood in the municipality and district of Elmalı, Antalya Province, Turkey. Its population is 121 (2022).
