= Çeşmeköy, Kaş =

Çeşmeköy
- Neighbourhood
- Location in Turkey
- Coordinates: 36.3888°N 29.7372°E
- Country: Turkey
- Province: Antalya
- District: Kaş
- Population (2022): 154
- Time zone: UTC+3 (TRT)

Çeşmeköy is a neighbourhood in the municipality and district of Kaş, Antalya Province, Turkey. Its population is 154 (2022).
