= Bayındır, Kaş =

Bayındır
- Neighbourhood
- Location in Turkey
- Coordinates: 36.1893°N 29.6815°E
- Country: Turkey
- Province: Antalya
- District: Kaş
- Population (2022): 891
- Time zone: UTC+3 (TRT)

Bayındır is a neighbourhood in the municipality and district of Kaş, Antalya Province, Turkey. Its population is 891 (2022).
