= Geriş, Akseki =

Geriş
- Neighbourhood
- Location in Turkey
- Coordinates: 36.9625°N 31.7331°E
- Country: Turkey
- Province: Antalya
- District: Akseki
- Population (2022): 91
- Time zone: UTC+3 (TRT)

Geriş is a neighbourhood in the municipality and district of Akseki, Antalya Province, Turkey. Its population is 91 (2022).
