= Sütleğen, Kaş =

Sütleğen
- Neighbourhood
- Location in Turkey
- Coordinates: 36°27′N 29°36′E
- Country: Turkey
- Province: Antalya
- District: Kaş
- Population (2022): 892
- Time zone: UTC+3 (TRT)

Sütleğen is a neighbourhood in the municipality and district of Kaş, Antalya Province, Turkey. Its population is 892 (2022).
