= Çamlıköy, Kaş =

Çamlıköy
- Neighbourhood
- Location in Turkey
- Coordinates: 36.4418°N 29.4900°E
- Country: Turkey
- Province: Antalya
- District: Kaş
- Population (2022): 197
- Time zone: UTC+3 (TRT)

Çamlıköy is a neighbourhood in the municipality and district of Kaş, Antalya Province, Turkey. Its population is 197 (2022).
