= Çataloluk, Kaş =

Çataloluk
- Neighbourhood
- Location in Turkey
- Coordinates: 36.3178°N 29.6692°E
- Country: Turkey
- Province: Antalya
- District: Kaş
- Population (2022): 138
- Time zone: UTC+3 (TRT)

Çataloluk is a neighbourhood in the municipality and district of Kaş, Antalya Province, Turkey. Its population is 138 (2022).
