= Gökçeören, Kaş =

Gökçeören
- Neighbourhood
- Location in Turkey
- Coordinates: 36°14′18″N 29°32′36″E
- Country: Turkey
- Province: Antalya
- District: Kaş
- Population (2022): 1,455
- Time zone: UTC+3 (TRT)

Gökçeören (also Seyret) is a neighbourhood in the municipality and district of Kaş, Antalya Province, Turkey. Its population is 1,455 (2022).
