= Çıplaklı, Alanya =

Çıplaklı
- Neighbourhood
- Location in Turkey
- Coordinates: 36.5646°N 32.0495°E
- Country: Turkey
- Province: Antalya
- District: Alanya
- Population (2022): 9,139
- Time zone: UTC+3 (TRT)

Çıplaklı is a neighbourhood in the municipality and district of Alanya, Antalya Province, Turkey. Its population is 9,139 (2022). Before the 2013 reorganisation, it was a town (belde).
