= Güneyköy, Gazipaşa =

Güneyköy
- Neighbourhood
- Country: Turkey
- Province: Antalya
- District: Gazipaşa
- Population (2022): 470
- Time zone: UTC+3 (TRT)

Güneyköy is a neighbourhood in the municipality and district of Gazipaşa, Antalya Province, Turkey. Its population is 470 (2022).
