= Kuzköy, Elmalı =

Kuzköy
- Neighbourhood
- Location in Turkey
- Coordinates: 36.7000°N 29.7833°E
- Country: Turkey
- Province: Antalya
- District: Elmalı
- Population (2022): 117
- Time zone: UTC+3 (TRT)

Kuzköy is a neighbourhood in the municipality and district of Elmalı, Antalya Province, Turkey. Its population is 117 (2022).
