= Çukurbağ, Kaş =

Coordinates: 36.235°N 29.667°E

Çukurbağ
- Neighbourhood
- Location in Turkey
- Coordinates
- Country: Turkey
- Province: Antalya
- District: Kaş
- Population (2022): 646
- Time zone: UTC+3 (TRT)

Çukurbağ is a neighborhood in the municipality and district of Kaş, Antalya Province, Turkey. Its population is 646 (2022).
