= Bayırköy, Alanya =

Bayırköy
- Neighbourhood
- Location in Turkey
- Coordinates: 36°45′24″N 31°55′52″E
- Country: Turkey
- Province: Antalya
- District: Alanya
- Population (2022): 211
- Time zone: UTC+3 (TRT)

Bayırköy (also: Bayır) is a neighbourhood in the municipality and district of Alanya, Antalya Province, Turkey. Its population is 211 (2022). In 2001 it passed from the Gündoğmuş District to the Alanya District.
