= Isinda =

Isinda (Ancient Greek: Ἴσινδα) may refer to:

- Isinda (Ionia), a town of ancient Ionia
- Isinda (Lycia), a town of ancient Lycia
- Isinda (Pisidia), a city and bishopric of ancient Pisidia
