= Kakasbos =

Kakasbos (in Ancient Greek Κακασβος, but discovered only under the dative declination Κακασβω) is an ancient Anatolian deity. Linked to Herakles at latest at the beginning of the Roman Imperial Era, he has been venerated exclusively in Southern Asia Minor, more precisely in Lycia and Pisidia. As a club-bearing horse rider god, Kakasbos seems to be related to protection against wild dangers, but this hypothesis is still discussed among historians.

== Etymology ==
Scholarship suggests that the second part of the name, asbos, is related to words for horse in the Anatolian languages and, ultimately, derives from Proto-Indo-European language *h₁éḱwos. A Lycian name, Xaxakba (or χaχakba), is also assumed to be "identical" to Kakasbos, from a reconstructed *Xaxasba, the second stem, *-asba, meaning 'horse'.

== Mythology ==
The mythology around Kakasbos is unfortunately unknown since no text revealing this aspect of his cult has been unearthed until now. The probability of such a discovery stays thin when we consider that Lycians only produced a very small amount of texts, let alone texts that are not administrative or funerary in subject. Moreover, Greeks and Romans did not seem to be interested to Lycian and Pisidian cults. Only a tiny amount of texts mention Lycian or Pisidian deities such as Maseis or Tarchunt.

== Cult ==
=== Extent ===
Kakasbos’ cult was limited to Southern Asia Minor, in Lycia and Pisidia. Almost all traces left by cultists were found in the region delimited by modern towns of Fethiye (formerly Telmessos) and Nebiler (about a dozen kilometers south-west of Korkuteli). Some steles dedicated to him were discovered in other Anatolian cities (Miletus or Halicarnassus, for example) or in Rhodes, but no doubt exists about their Lycian or Pisidian origin.

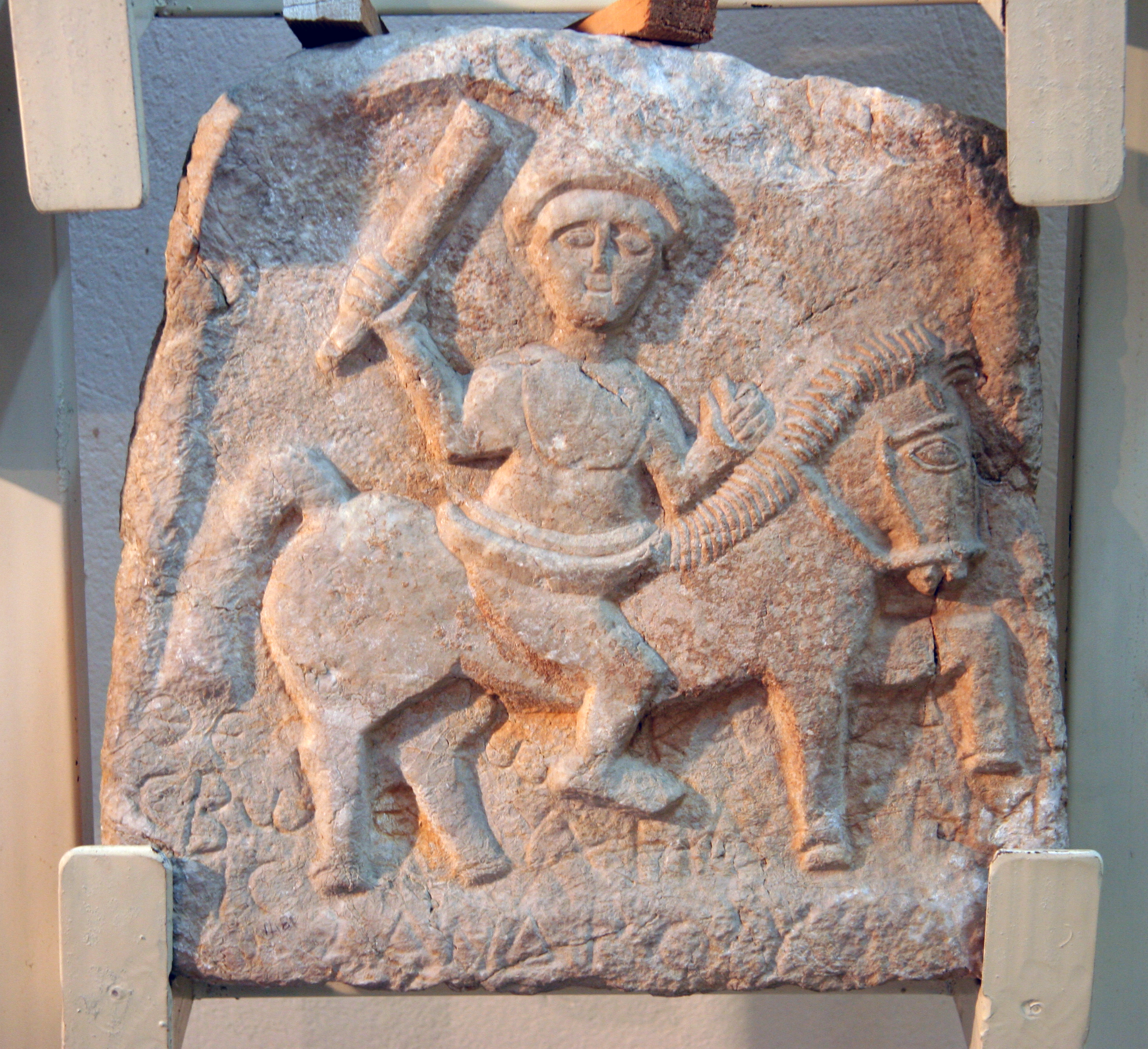
Stele dedicated to Kakasbos, Fethiye Museum, inv. 2.11.79.1481, 3rd-4th century AD, Limestone

=== Traces ===
Kakasbos received a cult intimately linked to Herakles’. Traces left are in fact absolutely equivalent. The only way to actually distinguish the dedicatee is an explicit deity name in the dedication. Near Yuvalak, close to Tefenni, a sanctuary regrouping several dozen wall bas reliefs showing Kakasbos and Heracles was found. However, most sculptures are highly eroded, giving historians very limited understanding of the deities or the archaeological site. Furthermore, the dozen inscriptions accompanying some of the reliefs were very damaged. Only four or five readable inscriptions remain, that are not enough for a solid analysis.

Other sources are, however, more revealing. 121 steles decorated with a relief and inscribed in Ancient Greek have been found in Northern Lycia and Southern Pisidia. The very short inscriptions – five to seven words – bear a dedicatory nature and adopt the same format, with few variations: ‘Someone, son of Someone, [accomplished] to Kakasbos/Heracles his vow.’ They reveal that the dedications are made mainly by people bearing Greek names, but also by several dedicators bearing Anatolian names. A couple of Latin names occurred, not enough though to suggest any Latin influence. All combinations between the origin of dedicator’s name and dedicatee occur; no ethnic cleavage seems to appear. On the other side, the reliefs are well preserved generally speaking: some details in the face of the deity, in his equipment or in his mount are still evident. Moreover, uninscribed steles – more than a hundred – have been found in Lycia and Pisidia. They offer a useful complement to inscribed ones, but do not bring new comprehension material.

Finally, other sources were linked to Kakasbos. Coins bearing a horse riding deity wielding a weapon close to a club were unearthed, but none explicitly identified Herakles or Kakasbos. The name of Kakasbos seems to be written – in a distorted manner – on a gnostic gem, but the inscription is unique and cannot be linked to the deity. Figurines looking like an unidentified club bearing rider god were found in a temple in Sagalassos. However, several historians asserted that it was probably not Kakasbos, and that the temple was not dedicated to the Anatolian rider god.

== Bibliography ==
- Locatelli, Lauriane. 2015. "Le Cheval Dans l’onomastique Du Sud-Ouest De l’Anatolie". In: Bulletin De l’Académie Belge Pour l’Étude Des Langues Anciennes Et Orientales 4 (mai), 101-10. https://doi.org/10.14428/babelao.vol4.2015.20053.
