= Toriaeum =

Town of ancient Lycia

Coordinates: 36°57′04″N 29°55′10″E

Toriaeum or Toriaion was a town of ancient Lycia, inhabited during Roman and Byzantine times. During Roman times it was a Roman colony; during Byzantine times it seems to have appeared in the Synecdemus as Komistaraos (Ancient Greek: κώμης Τοριαίου, romanized: komis Toriaiou).

Its site is located near Kozağacı, 5 kilometres (3.1 mi) south of Kızılcadağ and 32 kilometres (20 mi) north of Elmalı, in Asiatic Turkey.
