= Hayal Edince =

2014 Turkish Airlines commercial

- Agency: Mullenlowe Istanbul
- Client: Turkish Airlines
- Language: Turkish
- Running time: 2 minutes and 11 seconds
- Release date: 23 April 2014
- Directed by: Bahadır Karataş
- Production company: Filmpark
- Produced by: Tuğrul Karadeniz; Ahmet Uygun; Emirhan Akıncı

Hayal Edince (transl. When You Dream) is a 2014 Turkish-language television commercial of Turkish Airlines produced by Mullenlowe Istanbul and directed by Bahadır Karataş. The commercial follows four young children that are dreaming of having an aircraft visit their local area. Filming took place in a rural village in the Antalya Province and production was completed in three months. Released on the National Sovereignty and Children's Day, the commercial was praised nationally as one of the most well received advertisements of the year.

== Plot ==
Four children in a small village in Iğdır watch a flight cruise over them and wonder if they can bring an aircraft to their city too. They create a small airport in a field nearby using basic materials and wave at another cruising aircraft to get it to land there, without success. At night, a wedding is happening at the village, and the temporary lights used to light up the area inspires one of the children. They take the lights use them to mark the outline of their runway at dark. They plug it in just in time for another aircraft, but that one also keeps flying its own course. Just as the children give up in disappointment, the sun rises and another airplane turns towards their airport. The aircraft flies over in low altitude and the children follow it over in the hill, watching it land at Iğdır Airport. Later at the airport, a celebration is happening for the first flight of Turkish Airlines to city, which the children join as the flight crew is exiting the aircraft.

== Production and release ==
Hayal Edince was produced by Mullenlowe Istanbul and Filmpark. The commercial was directed by Bahadır Karataş, and produced by Tuğrul Karadeniz, Ahmet Uygun and Emirhan Akıncı. While the commercial is depicting the city of Iğdır, it was shot in the İmecik village of Korkuteli, Antalya in one and a half weeks. The children starring in the commercial did not come from a casting agency, but were selected locally instead. Complete production of the 2 minute and 11 seconds long advertisement took 3 months to complete.

The premiere of Hayal Edince was held during a Turkish Airlines event attended by key figures of the airline at the Haliç Congress Center on 22 April 2014. The commercial was released on television the next day on 23 April, during the National Sovereignty and Children's Day. A 2023 study concluded that the storyline of Hayal Edince had similarities with a commercial of Pristina International Airport released in 2013.

== Reception ==
The commercial was well received in Turkey. According to polling by Ipsos, Hayal Edince was both the most memorable and the most loved commercial of 2014 in the country. It was considered to be "successful as a sincere and impressive work that emphasizes the emotional structure" by the general public. Samantha Shankman of Skift commented that the commercial "whisks viewers back to their childhood when imagination was the only thing that stood between them and traveling the world". The Turkish-language edition of Campaign praised the "strong storyline" of the commercial. German marketing magazine Werben & Verkaufen ranked it as the second most emotional commercial of the year. In 2022, Turkish newspaper Yeniçağ called Hayal Edince "the best Turkish Airlines commercial to date".

=== Themes and analysis ===
Hayal Edince was aimed at a Turkish audience and included local and rural traditions, in contrast to most other commercials of the airline at that time, which generally had a globalist view and included widely known celebrities. The commercial includes many postmodernist themes and emphasizes the "national mission" of the airline to serve the entirety of Turkey and "to win over the local people".
