= Apollonia (Lycia) =

City in ancient Lycia

Coordinates: 36°11′12″N 29°45′50″E

- Ἀπολλωνία (Ancient Greek)
- Apolloniada
- Interactive map of Apollonia
- Type: Settlement
- Location: Kiliçli, Antalya Province, Turkey
- Region: Lycia

Apollonia (Ancient Greek: Ἀπολλωνία) was a city in ancient Lycia. Its ruins are located near Kiliçli (Sıçak), a small village in the Kaş district of Antalya Province, Turkey.

== History ==
Apollonia is not mentioned by ancient historians. The pillar tombs in the necropolis to the north of the city attest to a Lycian origin of the settlement, and date to c. 500 BC.

During the period when the region was under Roman control, the city was part of a local federation, or sympoliteia, that comprised Simena, Isinda and Aperlae. Led by Aperlae, it had one vote in the Lycian League.

The ruins of a Byzantine church possibly date to the 6th or 7th century AD, so the city was still occupied at that time.

== Description ==
Apollonia is located on a hill and has a walled acropolis at its highest elevation. In the east the acropolis seems to be double because a much older stockade is located inside the Byzantine walls. Two churches, a theater, baths with cisterns and a heroon are found on the western and northwestern side of the acropolis. Houses were built on the southwestern side. Six pillar tombs and one larger monument are found around the acropolis.

== Sources ==
- Dubin, Marc S.; Gawthrop, John; Richardson, Terry, eds. (2003). The Rough Guide to Turkey. New York City, New York: Rough Guides. ISBN 9781843530718.
- Keen, Anthony G. (1998). Dynastic Lycia: A Political History of the Lycians & Their Relations with Foreign Powers, c. 545-362 BC. Leiden: Brill. ISBN 9789004109568.
- Marksteiner, Thomas (2010). Lykien: Ein archäologischer Führer (in German). Phoibos Verlag. pp. 123–126. ISBN 978-3-85161-029-1.
