= Pidasa =

Town of ancient Caria

Coordinates: 37°24′04″N 27°34′20″E

Pidasa (Ancient Greek: Πίδασα) or Pedasa (Πήδασα) was a town of ancient Caria. During the Ionian Revolt, the Persians suffered a defeat at Pidasa. It was once the chief seat of the Leleges. It was a polis (city-state) and a member of the Delian League. In the early Second Century B.C., Miletus absorbed the citizens and territory of Pidasa through a sympoliteia agreement.

In the time of Strabo the town had ceased to exist, and the name of the district, Pedasis (Πηδασίς), was the only remaining memorial of the place. As Herodotus assigns to Pedasa a portion of the territory of Miletus, the town must have been situated between Miletus, Halicarnassus, and Stratoniceia.

Its site is located near Cert Osman Kale, Asiatic Turkey, which is consistent with Herodotus' account.
