= Sibidounda =

Town of ancient Pisidia

Coordinates: 37°13′29″N 30°17′57″E

Sibidounda was a town of ancient Pisidia and later of Pamphylia inhabited during Roman and Byzantine times.

Its site is located at Bozova (Zivint), in Asiatic Turkey.
