= Battle of Keresztes =

16th-century battle during the Long Turkish War

Coordinates: 47°49′31″N 20°41′17″E

- Part of the Long Turkish War
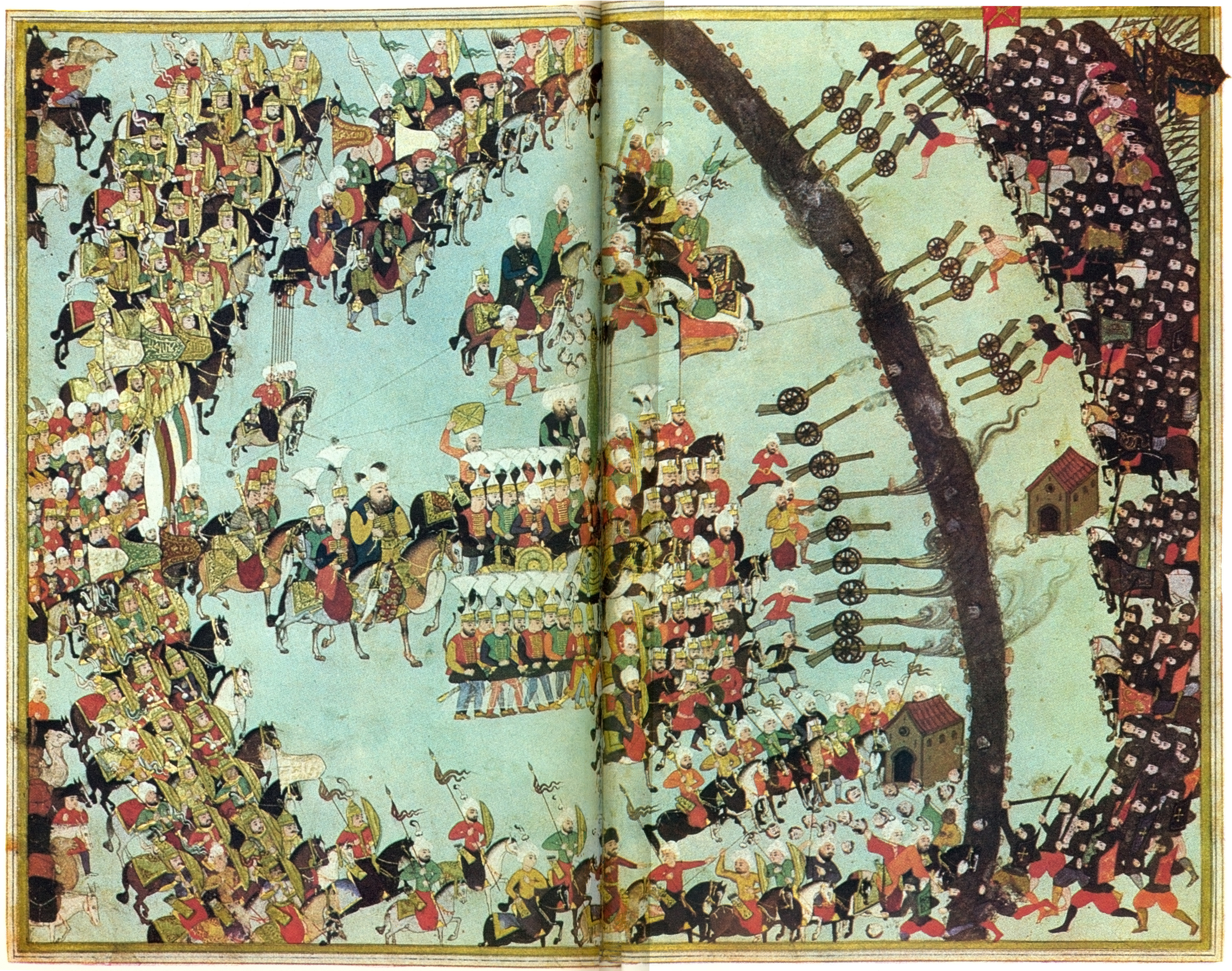
- Mehmed III leading his troops at the battle of Keresztes, Ottoman miniature.
Date	24–26 October 1596
Location	Mezőkeresztes, Hungary
Result	Ottoman victory

Belligerents
Ottoman Empire: Crimean Khanate	Habsburg monarchy Holy Roman Empire; Transylvania; Kingdom of Hungary; Kingdom of Bohemia; Papal States; Spain; Walloon and French mercenaries Serbs; Cossacks; Polish cavalry

Commanders and leaders
Mehmed III; Damat Ibrahim Pasha	Maximilian III; Sigismund Báthory

Strength
80,000–100,000 men 100 cannons	40,000;–50,000; 30–300 cannons: 14,000 Austrians, Germans and Walloons; 13,000 Hungarians; 10,000 Transylvanians; 3,000 Reiters; 5,000 Bohemians; Few hundred Cossacks and Poles; Few hundred Italians, French and Serbs

Casualties and losses
20,000–30,000 (Note: 4 Beylerbey 16 Sancak Bey 400 Çavuş)	23,000–30,000+(Western sources)

The Battle of Keresztes (also known as the Battle of Mezőkeresztes) (Turkish: Haçova Muharebesi) took place on 24–26 October 1596. It was fought between a combined Habsburg-Transylvanian force and the Ottoman Empire near the village of Mezőkeresztes (Turkish: Haçova) in modern-day northern Hungary. The Ottomans routed the Habsburg-led army, but due to their own losses, they were unable to exploit their victory.

== Background ==
On 23 June 1596, the Ottoman army marched from Constantinopole. Commanded by Sultan Mehmed III, the army marched through Edirne, Filibe (now known as Plovdiv), Sofia, and Niš to arrive at Belgrade on 9 August. On 20 August, the army crossed the River Sava by bridge and entered the Austrian territory of Srem. A war council was called at Slankamen Castle, and it was decided that they would begin a siege on the Hungarian fort of Eger (Erlau). The fort controlled the communication routes between Habsburg Austria and Transylvania, all of whom were in revolt against Ottoman suzerainty.

However, news soon arrived that the Austrians had besieged and succeeded in taking over the Castle of Hatvan and had brutally killed all the Ottomans housed there, including the women and children. The Ottoman army started a siege of the fort of Eger on 21 September 1596, and by 12 October the castle had capitulated. As retaliation for the Hatvan castle massacre, the defenders of the castle were all executed.

Not long after, Ottoman command received the report that a mixed army of Austrians and Transylvanians were advancing towards the Ottoman expeditionary force. A war council in the castle of Hatvan was conducted under Grand Vizier Damat Ibrahim Pasha. It was decided that the Ottoman army should march out of Erlau castle so as to meet the Austrians at a suitable battle terrain. The Sultan thought that the Ottoman army should disengage and return to Constantinople; it was with great difficulty that he was persuaded to engage the enemy forces. The Christian army had 10,000 Austrians, 4,000 Germans, 3,000 reiters, 13,000 Hungarian light cavalry and 10,000 Transylvanians, and additional troops from fifteen other European countries for a total of 55,000 men.

== Battle ==
The Ottoman army marched through several passageways of marshy terrain and reached Haçova (Turkish meaning: Plain of the Cross), exhausted after a long siege and a hard, long march. The two armies faced each other on the plains of Haçova (Hungarian: Mezőkeresztes). According to the report of the English diplomat Edward Barton, in very high numbers fought Crimean Tatar auxiliary forces in the Ottoman army into the battle of Keresztes.

The Austrian-Transylvanian army, under the joint command of Archduke Maximillian III of Austria and Prince Sigismund Bathory of Transylvania, was in position in fortified trenches. When the Ottoman army attacked the Austrian trenches, the Battle of Haçova commenced and continued for two days, from 25 to 26 October 1596. Early firearms (cannons, muskets) were used extensively in the battle. The Austrians, being entrenched around the old ruined church, succeeded in driving back the Ottoman assaults with a barrage of fire from muskets and 100 cannon.

By the second day of battle the Ottoman army appeared to have been defeated. According to the 17th Century Ottoman historian İbrahim Peçevi:

The Christians broke through the Ottoman army, but the soldiers of Islam had not yet felt the defeat. Then, they started to plunder and taking of booty at the command headquarters of the Ottomans. Under a few flags, a large group of Christian soldiers attacked the tent where the chests of gold money of the Ottoman Exchequer were kept. They killed and otherwise eliminated the Janissary and household cavalry soldiers guarding the State Treasury. The Christian soldiers got on the Treasury chests of gold coin and put up their flags of cross over them and started to dance around them."

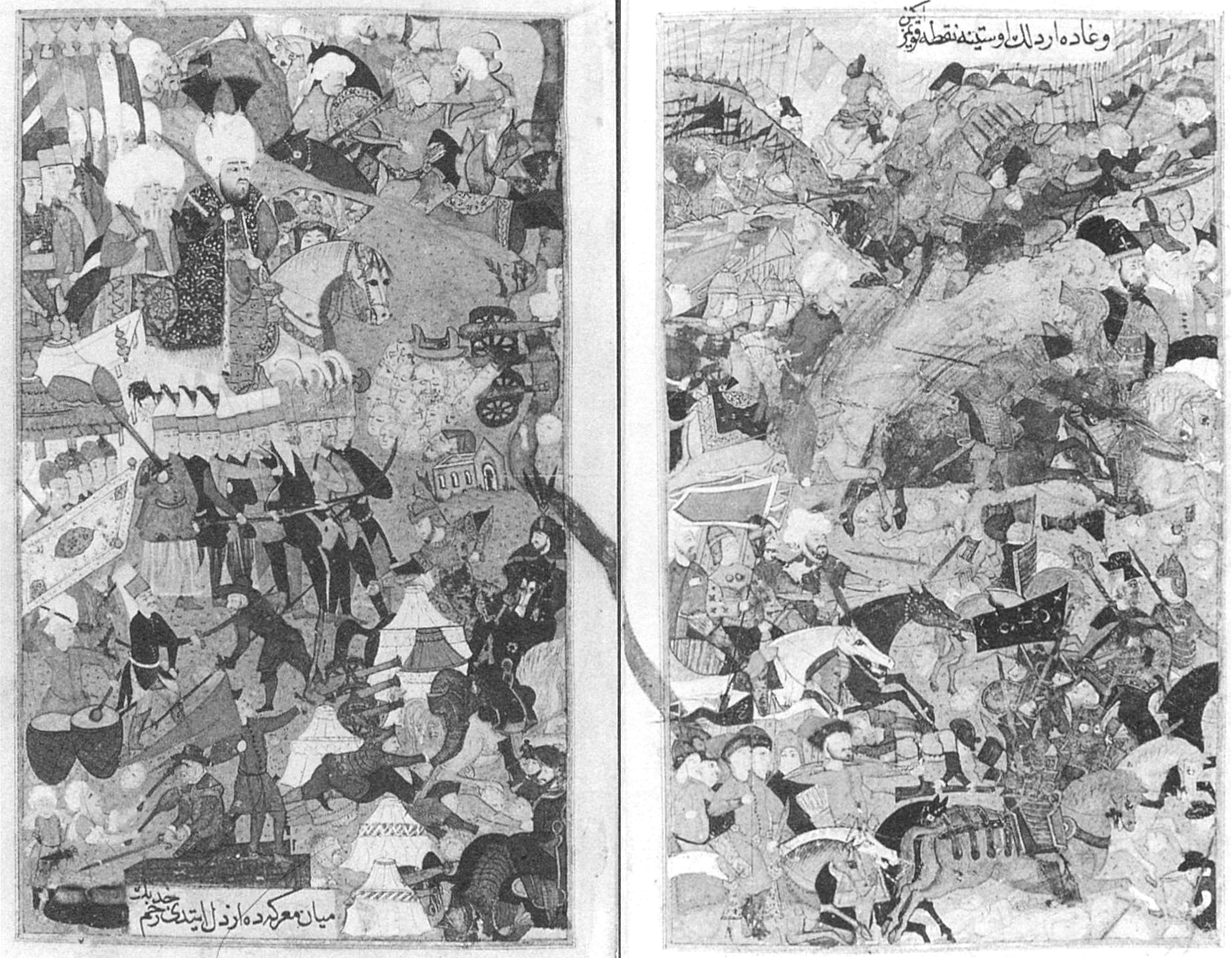
Sultan Mehmet III (left) at the Battle of Haçova. Nadiri's Diwan, ca. 1605

Commander Sultan Mehmed III wanted to flee from the battlefield. However, first he asked for the opinion of his tutor, the high cleric Hoca Sadeddin Efendi, who told the Sultan that he should continue the battle till the end. Heeding this advice, Sultan Mehmed III ordered that the battle should continue.

On the second day of the battle, the fighting intensified. Troops from the Austrian army had reached the Sultan's tent, which was surrounded by the viziers and the teachers at the Palace Pages School for protection. While some troops were trying to enter the Sultan's tent, the other Austrian army's soldiers disengaged, in search of booty and plunder instead of continuing the engagement. The Ottoman horse groomers, cooks, tent makers, and camel minders retaliated against the plunderers with whatever arms they could find, including cooks' spoons, blocks of wood, hammers for tent making, adzes, and axes for cutting wood. The Austrians were surprised and retreated in confusion. The cries of "the Christian enemy is fleeing" were heard by the Ottoman troops still fighting what seemed like a losing battle on the frontline. The boost of morale allowed them to recover the battle. With a major action from the Ottoman artillery cannons, the Ottoman forces started another attack on the Austrians across the front and the remaining Ottoman cavalry outflanked the Austrian-Transylvanian army, routing them.

A letter written by an Ottoman Kapi Agha who was present during the battle to his friend in Istanbul describes the battle as following:

"The brave men of that period, Çagalazade and Hasan Pasha, having sought refuge in God against the infidels, and the other emirs, commanders, and valiant soldiers of Islam, drew their swords and plunged into the sea of the enemy, their cries for Allah ascending to the heavens. Deli Hızır Pasha and the other Ottoman emirs arrived, and Fetih Giray Khan surrounded the unjust infidels from four sides. There was such an intense battle and struggle, a great battle, that it cannot be described or visualized. From the Army of fifty banners, of fifty-sixty thousand infidels, no one survived. His Excellency Cerrah Muhammed Pasha rendered great service in guarding the imperial tent, the treasuries, and the ammunition. In short, on Thursday at Kabakuşluk, the infidel enemy was put to rout, and God’s aid and victory fell to the armies of Islam. Thereafter, the Sultan—caliph upon the earth, may his sovereignty endure until the end of time—advanced with the soldiers of Islam, striking down the enemy infidels as far as the Fortress of Mudon. There, too, a fierce battle took place. The infidel enemy was put to rout, and one hundred and sixty cannons, thirty thousand muskets, fifty thousand arrows, and various other implements of war were seized. In addition, fifteen thousand tents and sixteen thousand cartloads of grain were destroyed; the remaining grain, which had previously cost three hundred and forty akçe per measure, fell to fifty."

The author talks about the encirclement and destruction of the disorganized units of the Habsburg Army after its failed attack on the Ottoman main camp. In the same letter, the author also describes some of the Ottoman losses and aftermath as following:

"To sum up, the following shall be stated: 2 Kapi Agha and 4 Imrahor were wounded. 4 Beylerbeyi, 16 Sanjak Beys, and 400 Çavuş of the Imperial Court were martyred. Since His Excellency İbrahim Pasha did not witness combat and, having departed from the site of the munitions raid to the Fortress of Eğri, returned only after the battle had concluded, he was dismissed from office at the instigation of Hoca Sadeddin Efendi. Moreover, the stipends of those who fled on the day of battle from the vile infidels, failed to present themselves at the muster, or, despite being ordered to attend to military duties, did not appear, were reassigned—both at the highest and the lowest rates—to those among the arıq oğlanları who served as comrades. In short, an allocation was made according to duties in such a manner that even those who ordinarily would have had no prospect of receiving a stipend were granted one."

== Aftermath ==
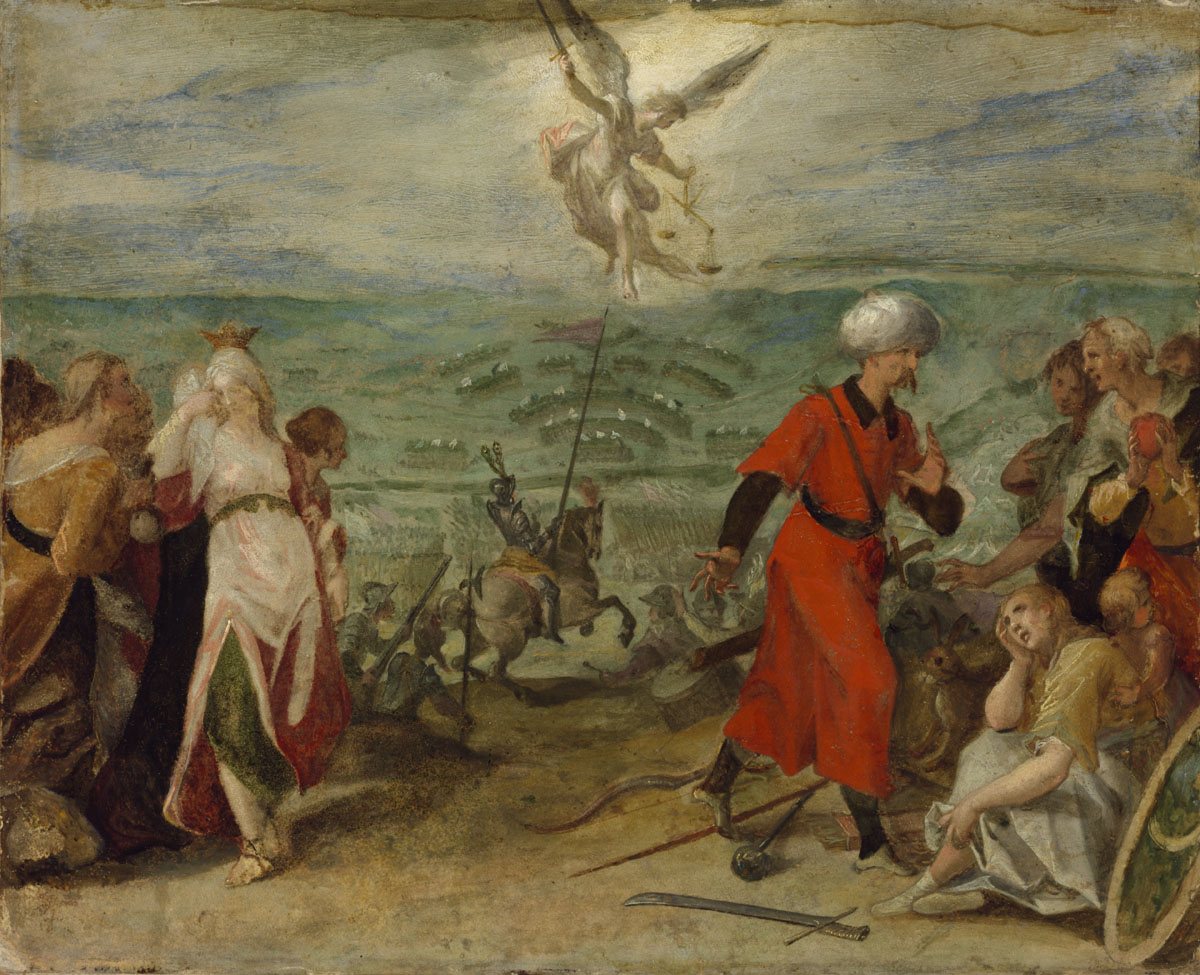
The allegory of the battle of Mezőkeresztes, 1603–1604, by Hans von Aachen.

Soon after victory, Mehmed III appointed Cigalazade Yusuf Sinan Pasha as the new Grand Vizier. He sent an imperial victory proclamation to Constantinople giving the news of the conquering of Eger (Erlau) Castle and the victory at the Battle of Haçova (Keresztes). This reached Constantinople in October and there were public celebrations and public meetings organized in the city. During these celebrations, four galleys full of state-procured sugar from Egypt arrived at the Golden Horn, which added "sweetness" to the news of a military victory. Mehmed III was awarded the epithet of 'Conqueror of Egri'.

The Sultan's army marched for a month, returning to Constantinople victorious. Mehmed III returned to Constantinople in November to a triumphal reception. His victory at Keresztes had turned him into a hero. The imperial Ottoman army returned to Constantinople victorious and were greeted happily by the residents of Constantinople. With the army in place, a great victory procession and many accompanying spectacles were carried out. The poets of Constantinople wrote special works about the victory. In the streets and markets of the city, town-criers were sent to announce that the streets of the city would be decorated to celebrate the great victory. Mehmed III wanted to celebrate this victory with great splendour. The warehouses and stores were all decorated with 'valuable cloths'. This display of colour all across the city is described in a poem by the poet [Kemal]:

All the shops of the city became colored due to conqueror sultan's wishes
Each of which were decorated as if it were the kerchief of the sweetheart

After the Battle was over, a roll call of the Ottoman military was conducted and discovered that 30,000 Sipahis were absent. They were later stripped of their Timar ownership as punishment. These act of properties seizure caused those Sipahis to rebelled against the Ottoman government and contributed to the outbreak of Celali rebellions. Karayazıcı, an Ottoman official, rose to become a leader among these rebels.

=== Casualties ===
The Christians lost 23,000 or over 30,000, while the Ottomans suffered 20,000–30,000 casualties.

== Sources ==
- Akdağ, Mustafa (1958). "1596 Sirasinda Osmanli Devletinin Umumî Durumu" (PDF). Ankara University Journal of the Faculty of Language, History and Geography. 16 (1). Ankara University: 53–107. Archived from the original on 28 February 2013.}
- Akdağ, Mustafa (1963). Celâlî İsyanlari (1550-1603) (PDF). Ankara University.
- Clodfelter, M. (2017). Warfare and Armed Conflicts: A Statistical Encyclopedia of Casualty and Other Figures, 1492-2015 (4th ed.). Jefferson, North Carolina: McFarland. ISBN 978-0786474707.
- Tucker, Spencer C., ed. (2010). "October 24-26, 1596: Central Europe: Hungary: Battle of Kerestes". A Global Chronology of Conflict: From the Ancient World to the Modern Middle East. Vol. TWO: 1500-1774. ABC-CLIO.
- George C. Kohn, Dictionary of wars, Infobase Publishing, 2007
- Archived 13 August 2009 at the Wayback Machine Article in History Today, "Last-minute Turkish victory at Keresztes".
- Battle of Mezőkeresztes (Hungarian) Archived 26 May 2007 at the Wayback Machine
- Sakaoglu, Necdet [1999], Bu Mulkun Sultanlari (Sultans of this realm), Constantinople:Oglak. ISBN 975-329-299-6. (Turkish)
- Shaw, Stanford J. [1976] History of the Ottoman Empire and Modern Turkey: Vol.1 Empire of the Gazis, Cambridge University Press. ISBN 0-521-29163-1.
- Várkonyi R., Ágnes (2001). Ambrus, Éva; Révai, Gábor (eds.). Megújulások kora. Budapest: Magyar Könyvklub. ISBN 963-547-070-3.
- "HAÇOVA MEYDAN SAVAŞI". TDV İslâm Ansiklopedisi (in Turkish).
