= Güzle =

Güzle can refer to:

- Güzle, Korkuteli
- Güzle, Refahiye
