= Ouerbe =

Ancient town

Coordinates: 37°14′22″N 30°15′59″E

Ouerbe was a town of ancient Pisidia and later of Pamphylia inhabited during Roman and Byzantine times. Its name does not occur among ancient authors, but is inferred from epigraphic and other evidence.

Its site is located at Yelten, in Asiatic Turkey.
