= Bozova (disambiguation) =

Bozova is a Turkish word. It may refer to:

== People ==
- Seval Bozova (born 2006), Turkish female handballer

== Places ==
- Bozova, a district in Şanlıurfa Province, Turkey
- Bozova, Korkuteli, a neighborhood of Korkuteli District in Antalya Province, Turkey
