= Osmankalfalar, Korkuteli =

Osmankalfalar
- Neighbourhood
- Location in Turkey
- Coordinates: 37°07′N 29°52′E
- Country: Turkey
- Province: Antalya
- District: Korkuteli
- Population (2022): 255
- Time zone: UTC+3 (TRT)

Osmankalfalar is a neighbourhood in the municipality and district of Korkuteli, Antalya Province, Turkey. Its population is 255 (2022).
