= Büyükköy, Korkuteli =

Büyükköy
- Neighbourhood
- Location in Turkey
- Coordinates: 37.1572°N 30.3061°E
- Country: Turkey
- Province: Antalya
- District: Korkuteli
- Population (2022): 1,235
- Time zone: UTC+3 (TRT)

Büyükköy is a neighbourhood in the municipality and district of Korkuteli, Antalya Province, Turkey. Its population is 1,235 (2022). Before the 2013 reorganisation, it was a town (belde).
