= Taşkesiği, Korkuteli =

Taşkesiği
- Neighbourhood
- Location in Turkey
- Coordinates: 37.2225°N 30.0750°E
- Country: Turkey
- Province: Antalya
- District: Korkuteli
- Population (2022): 523
- Time zone: UTC+3 (TRT)

Taşkesiği is a neighbourhood in the municipality and district of Korkuteli, Antalya Province, Turkey. Its population is 523 (2022).
