= Avdan, Korkuteli =

Avdan
- Neighbourhood
- Location in Turkey
- Coordinates: 36.8751°N 30.1476°E
- Country: Turkey
- Province: Antalya
- District: Korkuteli
- Population (2022): 571
- Time zone: UTC+3 (TRT)

Avdan is a neighbourhood in the municipality and district of Korkuteli, Antalya Province, Turkey. Its population is 571 (2022).
