= Yakaköy, Korkuteli =

Yakaköy
- Neighbourhood
- Location in Turkey
- Coordinates: 37.2403°N 30.3581°E
- Country: Turkey
- Province: Antalya
- District: Korkuteli
- Population (2022): 182
- Time zone: UTC+3 (TRT)

Yakaköy is a neighbourhood in the municipality and district of Korkuteli, Antalya Province, Turkey. Its population is 182 (2022).
