= Karataş, Korkuteli =

Karataş
- Neighbourhood
- Location in Turkey
- Coordinates: 37.1177°N 30.3949°E
- Country: Turkey
- Province: Antalya
- District: Korkuteli
- Population (2022): 178
- Time zone: UTC+3 (TRT)

Karataş is a neighbourhood in the municipality and district of Korkuteli, Antalya Province, Turkey. Its population is 178 (2022).
