= Yeşilyayla, Korkuteli =

Yeşilyayla
- Neighbourhood
- Location in Turkey
- Coordinates: 37.2527°N 30.2315°E
- Country: Turkey
- Province: Antalya
- District: Korkuteli
- Population (2022): 1,517
- Time zone: UTC+3 (TRT)

Yeşilyayla is a neighbourhood in the municipality and district of Korkuteli, Antalya Province, Turkey. Its population is 1,517 (2022). Before the 2013 reorganisation, it was a town (belde).
