= Kevzer, Korkuteli =

Kevzer
- Neighbourhood
- Location in Turkey
- Coordinates: 37.1819°N 30.1769°E
- Country: Turkey
- Province: Antalya
- District: Korkuteli
- Population (2022): 705
- Time zone: UTC+3 (TRT)

Kevzer (formerly: Gümüşlü) is a neighbourhood in the municipality and district of Korkuteli, Antalya Province, Turkey. Its population is 705 (2022).
