= Çukurca, Korkuteli =

Coordinates: 37.25814°N 30.40306°E

Çukurca
- Neighbourhood
- Location in Turkey
- Coordinates
- Country: Turkey
- Province: Antalya
- District: Korkuteli
- Population (2022): 40
- Time zone: UTC+3 (TRT)

Çukurca is a neighbourhood in the municipality and district of Korkuteli, Antalya Province, Turkey. Its population is 40 (2022).
