= Göçerler, Korkuteli =

Göçerler
- Neighbourhood
- Country: Turkey
- Province: Antalya
- District: Korkuteli
- Population (2022): 141
- Time zone: UTC+3 (TRT)

Göçerler is a neighbourhood in the municipality and district of Korkuteli, Antalya Province, Turkey. Its population is 141 (2022).
