= İmrahor =

İmrahor ("stablemaster") is a Turkish word referring to the Ottoman court title of Master of the Horse. It can also refer to:

== Structure ==
- Monastery of Stoudios, a Byzantine-era monastery in Istanbul, Ottoman Empire later converted into a mosque named İmrahor Mosque
- Imrahor Mosque (Üsküdar), a historical mosque in the district of Üsküdar, Istanbul province, Turkey
- Mirahori Mosque (Turkish: İmrahor İlyas Bey Camii), a historical mosque in the city of Korçë (Turkish: Görice), Albania

== Settlement ==
- İmrahor, Ulukışla, a village in the district of Ulukışla, Niğde Province, Turkey
- İmrahor, Korkuteli, a village in the district of Korkuteli, Antalya Province, Turkey
- İmrahor, Arnavutköy, a neighborhood in Arnavutköy district of Istanbul province, Turkey
- İmrahor, Çankaya, a neighborhood in Çankaya district of Ankara province. Turkey
