= Bahçeyaka, Korkuteli =

Bahçeyaka
- Neighbourhood
- Location in Turkey
- Coordinates: 36.9635°N 29.9768°E
- Country: Turkey
- Province: Antalya
- District: Korkuteli
- Population (2022): 124
- Time zone: UTC+3 (TRT)

Bahçeyaka is a neighbourhood in the municipality and district of Korkuteli, Antalya Province, Turkey. Its population is 124 (2022).
