= Çıvgalar, Korkuteli =

Çıvgalar
- Neighbourhood
- Location in Turkey
- Coordinates: 36°57′N 29°48′E
- Country: Turkey
- Province: Antalya
- District: Korkuteli
- Population (2022): 124
- Time zone: UTC+3 (TRT)

Çıvgalar is a neighbourhood in the municipality and district of Korkuteli, Antalya Province, Turkey. Its population is 124 (2022). The village is located 520 kilometers south-west of the capital city Ankara.
