= Akyar, Korkuteli =

Akyar
- Neighbourhood
- Location in Turkey
- Coordinates: 37.1608°N 30.1806°E
- Country: Turkey
- Province: Antalya
- District: Korkuteli
- Population (2022): 726
- Time zone: UTC+3 (TRT)

Akyar is a neighbourhood in the municipality and district of Korkuteli, Antalya Province, Turkey. Its population is 726 (2022).
