= Yeleme, Korkuteli =

Yeleme
- Neighbourhood
- Location in Turkey
- Coordinates: 37.1761°N 30.0939°E
- Country: Turkey
- Province: Antalya
- District: Korkuteli
- Population (2022): 204
- Time zone: UTC+3 (TRT)

Yeleme (formerly: Başpınar) is a neighbourhood in the municipality and district of Korkuteli, Antalya Province, Turkey. Its population is 204 (2022).
