= Beğiş, Korkuteli =

Beğiş
- Neighbourhood
- Location in Turkey
- Coordinates: 36.9058°N 30.1003°E
- Country: Turkey
- Province: Antalya
- District: Korkuteli
- Population (2022): 76
- Time zone: UTC+3 (TRT)

Beğiş is a neighbourhood in the municipality and district of Korkuteli, Antalya Province, Turkey. Its population is 76 (2022).
