= Bayat, Korkuteli =

Bayat
- Neighbourhood
- Location in Turkey
- Coordinates: 37.0558°N 30.3177°E
- Country: Turkey
- Province: Antalya
- District: Korkuteli
- Population (2022): 245
- Time zone: UTC+3 (TRT)

Bayat is a neighbourhood in the municipality and district of Korkuteli, Antalya Province, Turkey. Its population is 245 (2022).
