= Esenyurt, Korkuteli =

Esenyurt
- Neighbourhood
- Location in Turkey
- Coordinates: 37.0567°N 30.3434°E
- Country: Turkey
- Province: Antalya
- District: Korkuteli
- Population (2022): 512
- Time zone: UTC+3 (TRT)

Esenyurt is a neighbourhood in the municipality and district of Korkuteli, Antalya Province, Turkey. Its population is 512 (2022).
