= Kızılaliler, Korkuteli =

Kızılaliler
- Neighbourhood
- Location in Turkey
- Coordinates: 36°59′27″N 29°58′00″E
- Country: Turkey
- Province: Antalya
- District: Korkuteli
- Population (2022): 176
- Time zone: UTC+3 (TRT)

Kızılaliler is a neighbourhood in the municipality and district of Korkuteli, Antalya Province, Turkey. Its population is 176 (2022).
