= Yazır, Korkuteli =

Yazır
- Neighbourhood
- Location in Turkey
- Coordinates: 37.0103°N 30.2898°E
- Country: Turkey
- Province: Antalya
- District: Korkuteli
- Population (2022): 1,636
- Time zone: UTC+3 (TRT)

Yazır is a neighbourhood in the municipality and district of Korkuteli, Antalya Province, Turkey. Its population is 1,636 (2022).

Yazır was formerly thought to be the site of the ancient city of Isinda, which is now placed at the village of Kişla.
