= Isindus =

Town of ancient Ionia

Isindus or Isindos (Ancient Greek: Ἴσινδος), also known as Isinda (Ἴσινδα) was a town of ancient Ionia, mentioned by Stephanus of Byzantium. It may be that Isinda in Pisidia, which claimed an Ionian origin, was colonised from here. It was a member of the Delian League since it appears in tribute records of Athens between the years 445/4 and 416/5 BCE. It is possible that it is the same city as the Ionda mentioned Diodorus Siculus that was occupied by Thimbron in the year 391/90 BCE before his occupation of a mountain near Ephesus.

Its site is unlocated.
