= Kargın, Korkuteli =

Kargın
- Neighbourhood
- Location in Turkey
- Coordinates: 37.0881°N 30.3556°E
- Country: Turkey
- Province: Antalya
- District: Korkuteli
- Population (2022): 173
- Time zone: UTC+3 (TRT)

Kargın is a neighbourhood in the municipality and district of Korkuteli, Antalya Province, Turkey. Its population is 173 (2022).
