= Garipçe, Korkuteli =

Garipçe
- Neighbourhood
- Location in Turkey
- Coordinates: 37.2953°N 30.3483°E
- Country: Turkey
- Province: Antalya
- District: Korkuteli
- Population (2022): 261
- Time zone: UTC+3 (TRT)

Garipçe is a neighbourhood in the municipality and district of Korkuteli, Antalya Province, Turkey. Its population is 261 (2022). It is located 2.8 km from the nearest village, Adalikuzu.
