= Yukarıkaraman, Korkuteli =

Yukarıkaraman
- Neighbourhood
- Location in Turkey
- Coordinates: 37.0666°N 30.0397°E
- Country: Turkey
- Province: Antalya
- District: Korkuteli
- Population (2022): 134
- Time zone: UTC+3 (TRT)

Yukarıkaraman is a neighbourhood in the municipality and district of Korkuteli, Antalya Province, Turkey. Its population is 134 (2022).
