= Isinda (Pisidia) =

Ancient Pisidian town

Coordinates: 37°04′03″N 30°09′43″E

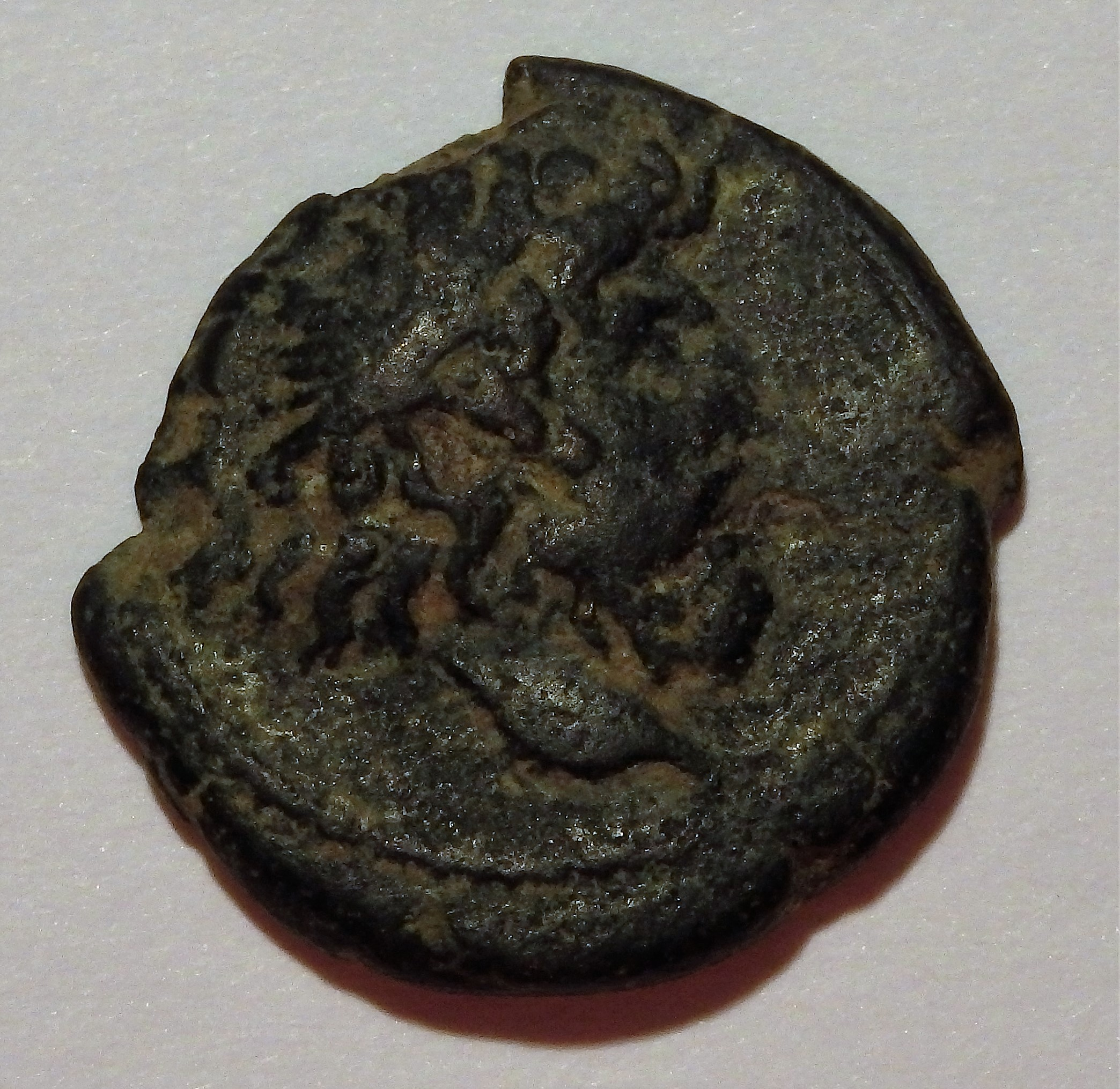
Bronze coin of Isinda; obverse with the head of Zeus, 1st century BCE

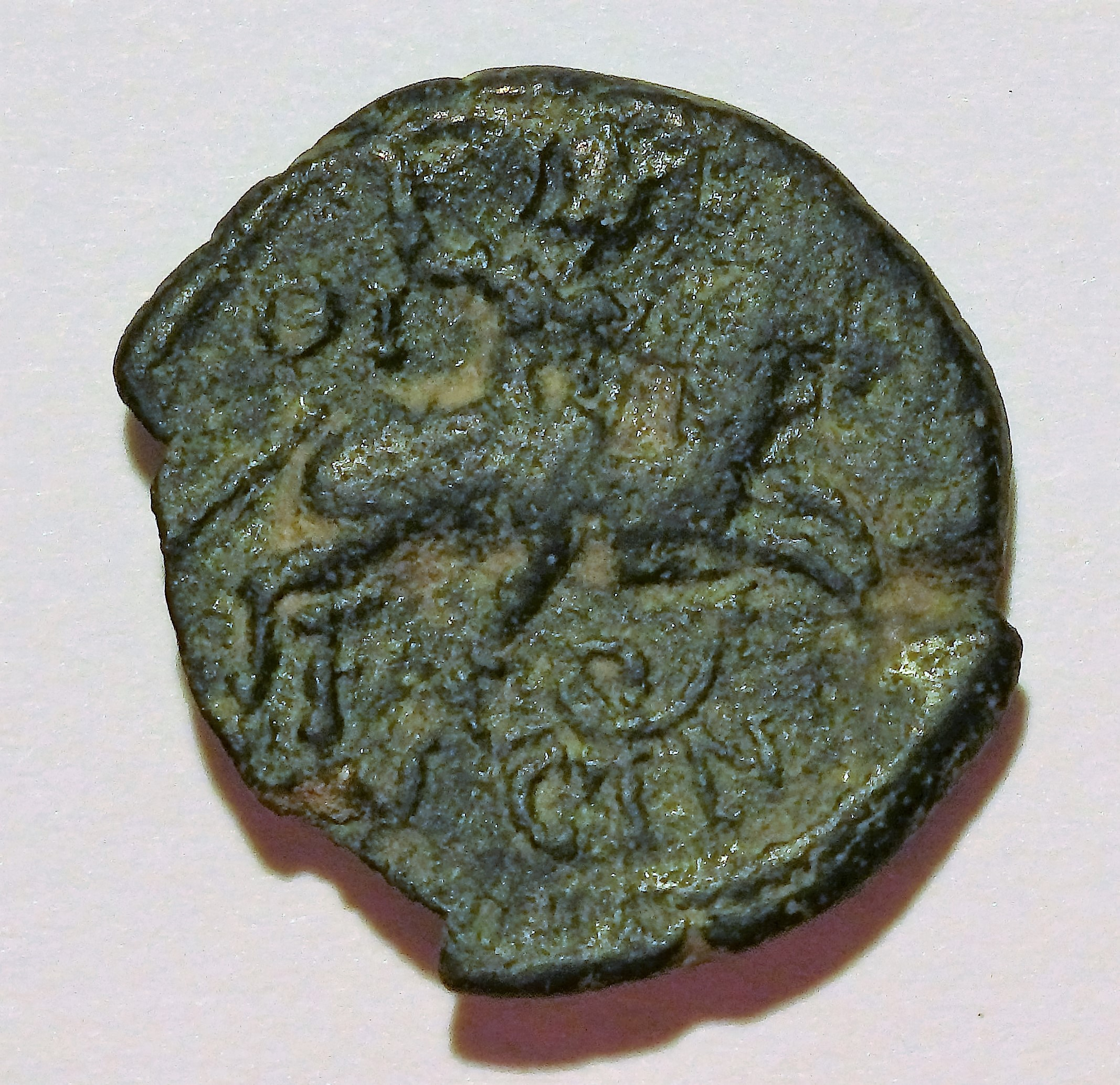
Bronze coin of Isinda; reverse with mounted warrior with spear

Isinda (Ancient Greek: Ἴσινδα) or Isionda (Ancient Greek: Ἰσιόνδα) was a town of ancient Pisidia.

Its site is located near Korkuteli, Asiatic Turkey. More precisely, the site is now thought to be at the village of Kişla, though formerly identified with Yazır. In the 1840s, Thomas Abel Brimage Spratt and Edward Forbes visited Kişla, an hour's ride from Korkuteli (referred to as Stenez), with extensive walls of soft stone and burnt brick, and identified it as the city of Isinda, which the Roman consul Gnaeus Manlius Vulso, on his victorious march through Asia Minor in 189 BCE, found besieged by Termessus. At the city's request he raised the siege and fined the Termessians 50 talents.

Isinda stood in a strategic position at the western end of the pass leading from Pamphylia by Termessus to Pisidia. Samples of the extensive coinage of Isinda are extant, which give evidence that it considered itself an Ionian colony.

Isinda was later included in the Roman province of Pamphylia Secunda. At an early stage, it became a Christian bishopric, a suffragan of the metropolitan see of Perge, the capital of the province. Of its bishops, Cyrillus took part in the First Council of Nicaea in 325, Edesius in the Council of Ephesus in 431, Marcellinus in the Council of Chalcedon in 451, Talleleus in the Second Council of Constantinople in 553, Ignatius in the Photian Council of Constantinople (879).

No longer a residential bishopric, Isinda is now listed by the Catholic Church as a titular see.

== Bishops holding the title ==
- Peter Augustine O'Neill, O.S.B. (26 November 1909 - 6 November 1911)
- Marcelin-Charles Marty (14 April 1919 - 3 February 1921)
- Emanuel-Anatole-Raphaël Chaptal de Chanteloup (20 February 1922 - 27 May 1943)
- Leonardo José Rodriguez Ballón, O.F.M. (30 December 1943 - 6 July 1945)
- Leo Joseph Suenens (12 November 1945 - 24 November 1961))
- Joseph William Regan, M.M. (1 February 1962 - 24 October 1994)
