= Kayabaşı, Korkuteli =

Kayabaşı
- Neighbourhood
- Location in Turkey
- Coordinates: 36.9748°N 29.8051°E
- Country: Turkey
- Province: Antalya
- District: Korkuteli
- Population (2022): 406
- Time zone: UTC+3 (TRT)

Kayabaşı is a neighbourhood in the municipality and district of Korkuteli, Antalya Province, Turkey. Its population is 406 (2022).
