= Karabayır, Korkuteli =

Karabayır
- Neighbourhood
- Location in Turkey
- Coordinates: 36.9500°N 30.0500°E
- Country: Turkey
- Province: Antalya
- District: Korkuteli
- Population (2022): 150
- Time zone: UTC+3 (TRT)

Karabayır is a neighbourhood in the municipality and district of Korkuteli, Antalya Province, Turkey. Its population is 150 (2022).
