= Tatköy, Korkuteli =

Tatköy
- Neighbourhood
- Location in Turkey
- Coordinates: 37.0447°N 30.2406°E
- Country: Turkey
- Province: Antalya
- District: Korkuteli
- Population (2022): 810
- Time zone: UTC+3 (TRT)

Tatköy is a neighbourhood in the municipality and district of Korkuteli, Antalya Province, Turkey. Its population is 810 (2022).
