= Sımandır, Korkuteli =

Sımandır
- Neighbourhood
- Location in Turkey
- Coordinates: 36.9803°N 30.1289°E
- Country: Turkey
- Province: Antalya
- District: Korkuteli
- Population (2022): 603
- Time zone: UTC+3 (TRT)

Sımandır (formerly: Ulucak) is a neighbourhood in the municipality and district of Korkuteli, Antalya Province, Turkey. Its population is 603 (2022).
