= Yalınlıgediği, Korkuteli =

Yalınlıgediği
- Neighbourhood
- Location in Turkey
- Coordinates: 37°12′N 30°20′E
- Country: Turkey
- Province: Antalya
- District: Korkuteli
- Population (2012): 106
- Time zone: UTC+3 (TRT)

Yalınlıgediği is a neighbourhood in the municipality and district of Korkuteli, Antalya Province, Turkey. Its population was 106 in 2012.
