= Mamatlar, Korkuteli =

Mamatlar
- Neighbourhood
- Location in Turkey
- Coordinates: 37.0052°N 29.9166°E
- Country: Turkey
- Province: Antalya
- District: Korkuteli
- Population (2022): 214
- Time zone: UTC+3 (TRT)

Mamatlar is a neighbourhood in the municipality and district of Korkuteli, Antalya Province, Turkey. Its population is 214 (2022).
