= Aperlae =

Ancient Lycian town

- Ἄπερλαι (Ancient Greek)
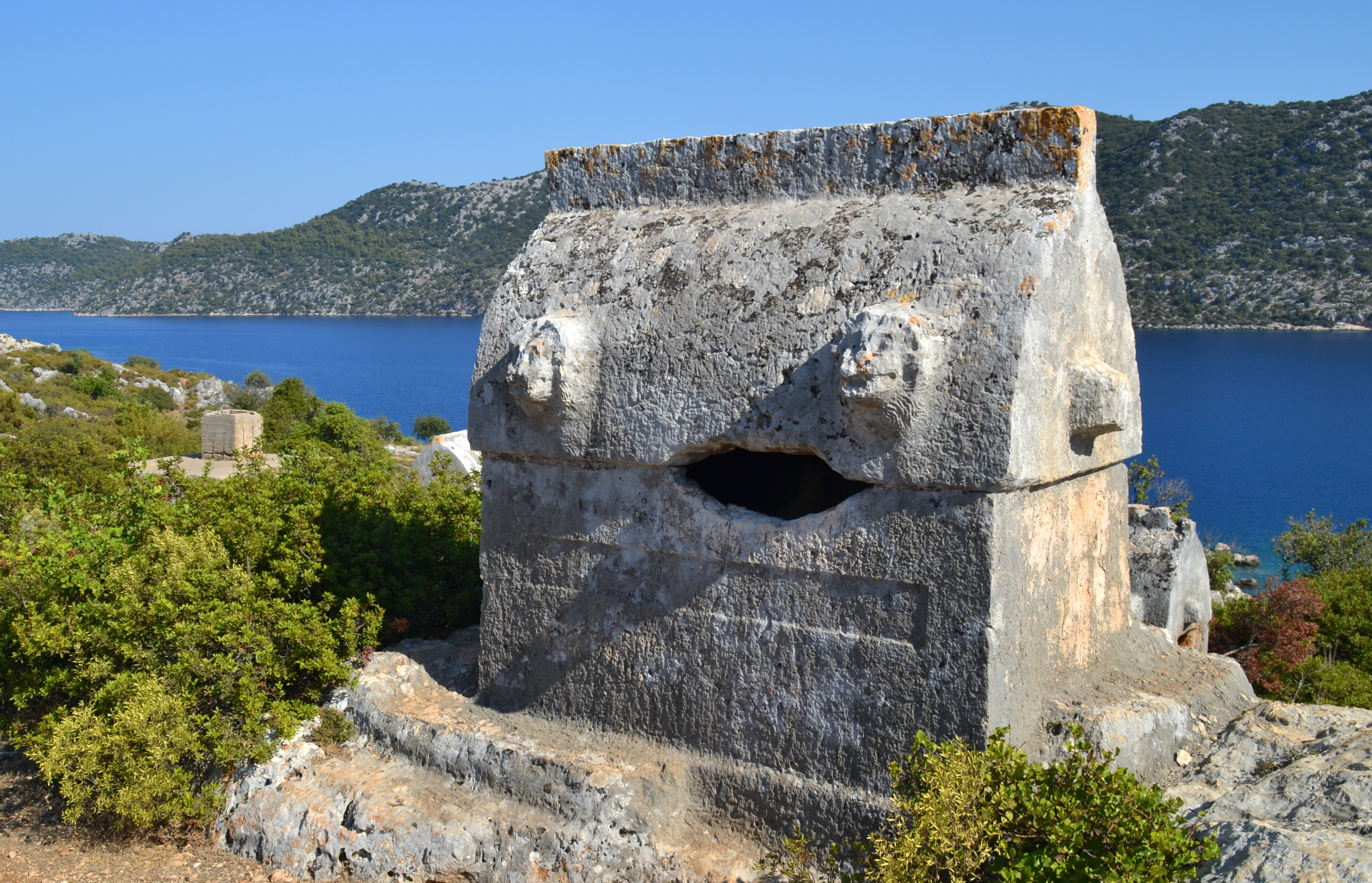
- Sarcophagus in Aperlai

- Location within Turkey
- 36°09′34″N 29°46′56″E
- Type: Settlement
- Location: Antalya Province, Turkey
- Part of: Lycia

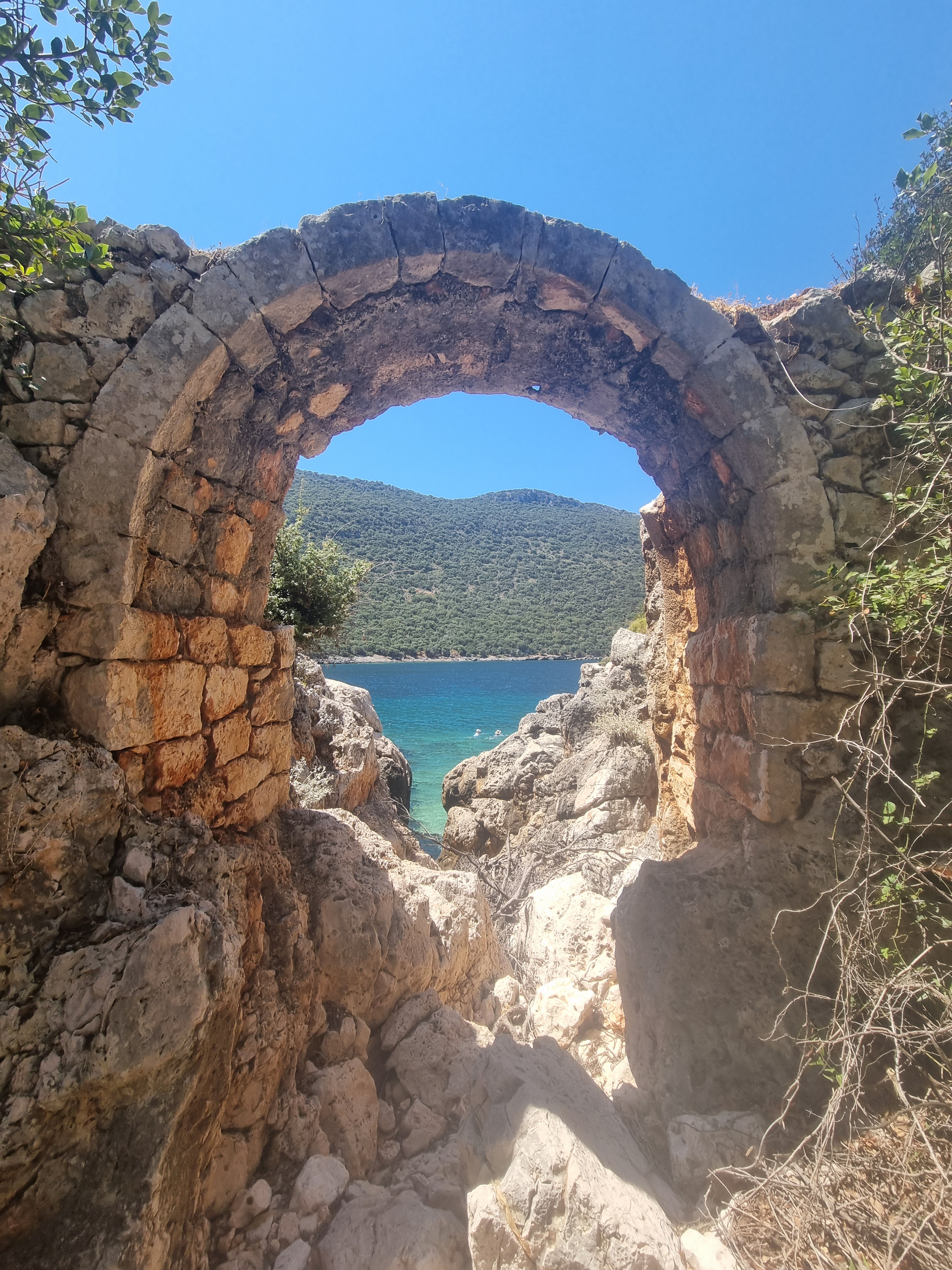
Roman bridge near Aperlae

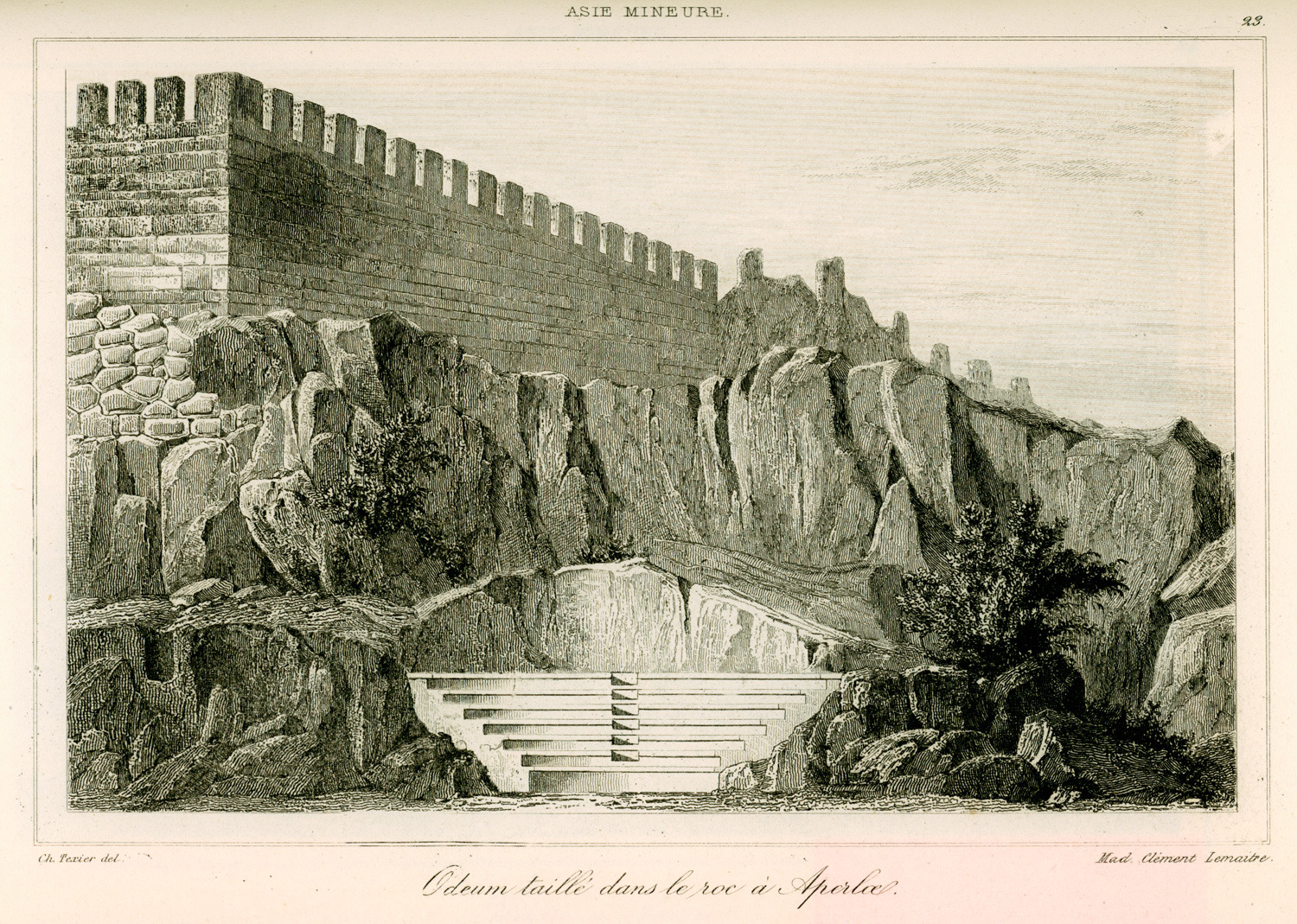
Odeon of Aperlae, Charles Texier, 1882

Aperlae or Aperlai (Ancient Greek: Ἄπερλαι, romanized: Aperlai) was an ancient city on the southern coast of ancient Lycia. It did not play any significant role in history or politics, yet its lifespan of 1,300 years is worth note.

The harsh local terrain made agriculture difficult, but like other towns along the coast, it thrived on the production of royal purple (or Tyrian dye).

== Location and name ==
The town's position is fixed by the Stadiasmus at 60 stadia west of Somena, and 64 stadia west of Andriace. William Martin Leake (Asia Minor, p. 188) supposed Somena to be the Simena of Pliny (v. 27). Aperlae, which is written in the text of Claudius Ptolemy Aperrae, and in Pliny Apyrae, is proved to be a genuine name by an inscription found by Charles Robert Cockerell, at the head of Hassar bay, with the ethnic name Ἀπερλειτων on it. But there are also coins of Gordian III with the ethnic name Ἀπερραιτων. The confusion between the "l" and the "r" in the name of a small place is nothing remarkable.

=== Geography ===
Aperlae is situated near a bay but in a storm the bay offered little protection for ships. The city lies between the mountains and the coast where there were no reliable sources of fresh water and numerous cisterns around the town indicate a reliance on rain water.

A striking feature of the Aperlae site was the vast amount of Murex snail shells. In two parts of town they were dumped covering altogether 1,600 m^{2} (at an unknown depth until the Turkish government allows archeologists to dig). They were used in the mortar and concrete of the buildings of the city, and they were found in large quantities dumped in the sea.

== History ==
Aperlae was founded sometime between the late 4th and early 3rd century BC and sustained a long lifespan of about 1,300 years until the end of the 7th century AD. Aperlae was at the head of a sympolity including Simena, Isinda and Apollonia.

With the start of the Muslim conquests, security of the coast failed and Aperlae was abandoned due to the threat of pirate raids and Arab corsairs. Though with the evidence of some late repairs on a church suggest that there was possibly a small settlement of squatters or stragglers after it was left, Aperlae was never rebuilt and resettled.

== Economy ==
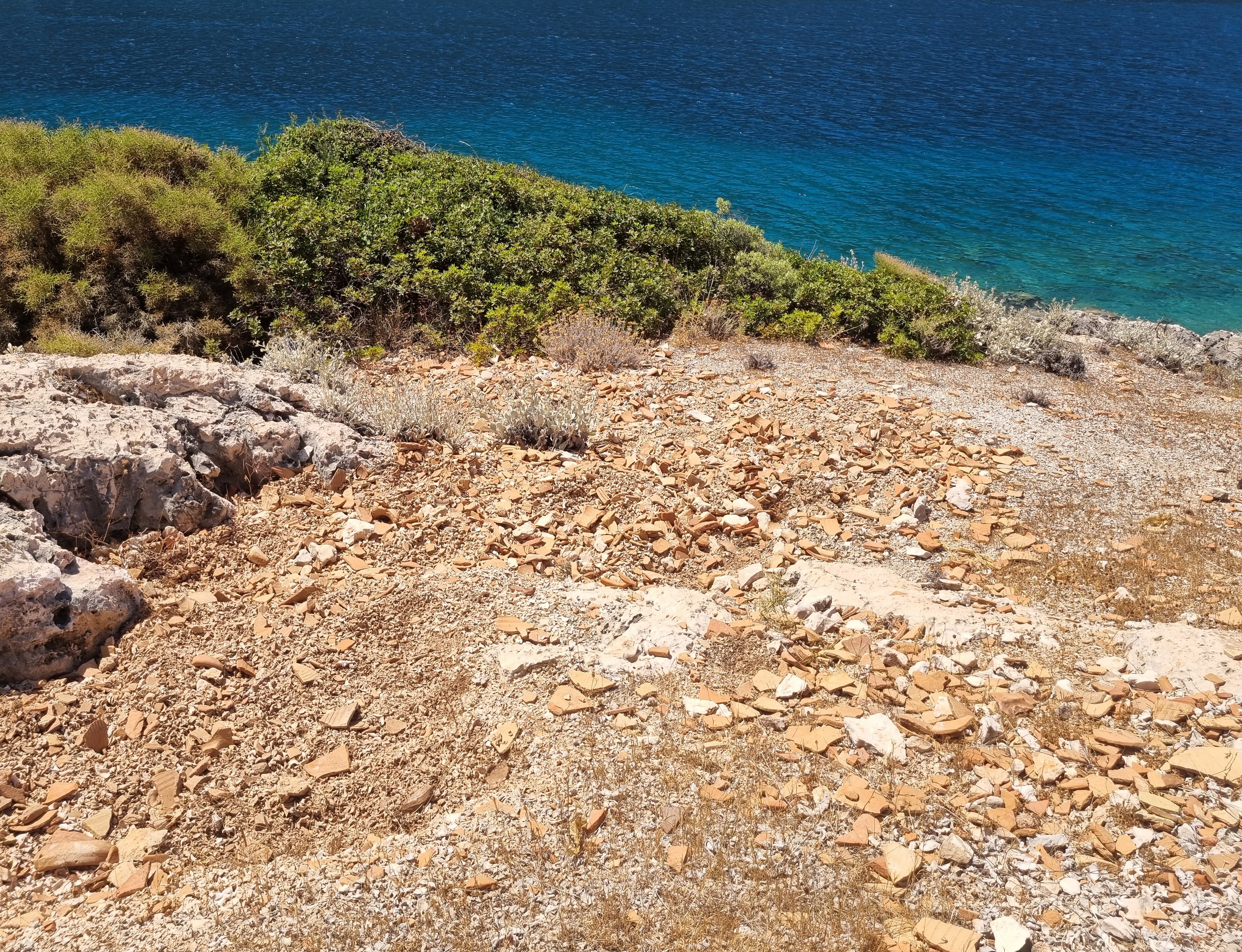
Broken murex shells and potsherds testify to the main industry of the city in Antiquty

The economy was built around the production of Tyrian dye, a deep and costly purple which is gleaned from the hypobroncial gland of the Murex trunculus (which has been reclassified as Hexaplex trunculus), said to have cost 20 times its weight in gold. Experiments conducted in 1909 concluded that it would take 12,000 snails to produce 1.4 grams or 0.05 oz. Three ceramic lined vats found in the sunken district are suggested to have been holding tanks for the live snails until there were enough to be processed. Evidence of the presence of other mollusks in these piles indicates that the Murex were collected using nets and not by hand.

Though there was a rudimentary harbour with a jetty but not a breakwater, it is evident from the opulence presented by the city that there were more than enough resources to make one if they wanted. The city boasted four churches, a great number of tombstones and good fortifications which indicate an affluence of that time.

== Ecclesiastical history ==
Since it was in the Roman province of Lycia, the bishopric of Aperlae was a suffragan of the metropolitan see of Myra, the province's capital, and was among the most important of the suffragan sees, being mentioned in fifth place in the Notitiae Episcopatuum of Pseudo-Epiphanius, composed under Byzantine Emperor Heraclius in about 640. No name of any of its bishops was identified by Le Quien in his Oriens christianus in quatuor Patriarchatus digestus.

=== Titular see ===
No longer a residential bishopric, Aperlae is today listed by the Catholic Church as a titular see, as the diocese was nominally restored in 1933, the curiate Italian name version being Aperle.

It is vacant since decades, having had only the following incumbents, both of the lowest (episcopal) rank :

- Ferdinando Baldelli (1959.07.22 – 1963.07.20), President of Caritas Internationalis (1951 – 1962)
- Felicissimus Alphonse Raeymaeckers, Capuchin Franciscans (O.F.M. Cap.) (1963.08.05 – 1967.03.12) as Auxiliary Bishop of Lahore (1963.08.05 – 1966) and next Coadjutor Bishop of Lahore (1966 – 1967.03.12), later succeeding as Bishop (12 March 1967 Succeeded - 10 July 1975 Resigned)

== Works cited ==
- Carter, R.S.. "The Submerged Seaport of Aperlae." International Journal of Nautical Archeology 7(1978): 177-85. Print.
- Hohlfelder, Robert L.; Vann, Robert L. "Cabotage at Aperlae in Ancient Lycia." International Journal of Nautical Archeology 29(2000): 126-135. Print.
- Hohlfelder, Robert L.; Vann, Robert L. "Uncovering the Maritime Secrets of Aperlae, a Coastal Settlement of Ancient Lycia." Near Eastern Archeology 61(1998): 26-37. Print.
