= Isinda (Lycia) =

Ancient Lycian town

Coordinates: 36.191647°N 29.697247°E

- İsinda (Turkish); Ἴσινδα (Ancient Greek)
- Ruins at Isinda
- Interactive map of Isinda
- Type: settlement
- Location: Belenli, Antalya Province, Turkey
- Region: Lycia

Site notes
- Condition: Ruined
- Public access: Yes

Isinda (Turkish: İsinda, Ancient Greek: Ἴσινδα) was a town of ancient Lycia. Isinda was part of a sympoliteia (a treaty for political organization used in Ancient Greece) with Aperlae, Apollonia and Simena.

The city's ruins are located on a hill above the modern Turkish village of Belenli. At the site, the remains of a city wall and other buildings are preserved, as well as some Lycian pillars and rock tombs.

== History ==
The ancient Lycian city of Isinda was inhabited before the first half of the 4th century BC. From inscriptions it is known that Isinda was a minor member of a sympoliteia (a type of treaty for political organization) that was dominated by the city of Aperlae, but which also included Apollonia and Simena. Isinda is not mentioned by early historians.

The citizens of Isinda migrated to the nearby city of Antiphellos during the Pax-Romana, and the settlement became abandoned.

== Description ==
Isinda is an archaeological site in Lycia, located 6 kilometres (3.7 mi) from the modern Turkish town of Kaş, and situated on a hilltop 90 metres (300 ft) above the modern village of Belenli.

The ruined defensive wall is made of poor quality rectangular limestone blocks, and show signs of continual repair. Within the walls at Isinda are wells and cisterns for collecting rain water. The most important remaining feature of the site is a house-tomb with an inscription wriiten in the ancient Lycian on the pediment.

At the top of the hill are buildings, including steps that lead to a stoa (covered walkway) and projecting wingsleading off the main building.

The tombs include three rock tombs with inscriptions written in Lycian and a pillar tomb carved with reliefs. On the slope towards the village are inscribed Gothic sarcophagi.

== Sources ==
- Akşit, İlhan (2006). Kline, Stuart (ed.). Lycia: The Land of Light. Istanbul: Aksit Kultur Turizm Sanat Ajans Lt. ISBN 975-7039-11-X.
- Bayburtluoğlu, Cevdet (2004). Lycia. Antalya: Suna & İnan Kıraç Research Institute on Mediterranean Civilizations. ISBN 978-97570-7-820-3.
- Bean, George Ewart (2017). "Isinda (Belenli) Turkey". In Stillwell, Richard; Macdonald, William L. (eds.). The Princeton Encyclopedia of Classical Sites. Princeton, New Jersey: Princeton University Press. ISBN 978-14008-8-658-6.
- Robert, Louis (1983). "Documents d'Asie Mineure". Bulletin de correspondance hellénique (in French). 107 (107–1): 497–599. doi:10.3406/bch.1983.1898.
- Talbert, Richard J.A., ed. (2000). Barrington Atlas Map-by-Map Directory. Princeton, New Jersey: Princeton University Press. ISBN 978-06910-4-945-8.
- T.C. Antalya Valiliği (2010). Dünden Bugüne Antalya [Antalya From Past to Present] (in Turkish). Vol. 2. T.C. Kültür ve Turizm Bakanlığı.
