= Çaykenarı, Korkuteli =

Çaykenarı
- Neighbourhood
- Location in Turkey
- Coordinates: 37.1877°N 30.3741°E
- Country: Turkey
- Province: Antalya
- District: Korkuteli
- Population (2022): 443
- Time zone: UTC+3 (TRT)

Çaykenarı is a neighbourhood in the municipality and district of Korkuteli, Antalya Province, Turkey. Its population is 443 (2022).
