= Kemerağzı, Korkuteli =

Kemerağzı
- Neighbourhood
- Location in Turkey
- Coordinates: 37.1065°N 30.3986°E
- Country: Turkey
- Province: Antalya
- District: Korkuteli
- Population (2022): 94
- Time zone: UTC+3 (TRT)

Kemerağzı is a neighbourhood in the municipality and district of Korkuteli, Antalya Province, Turkey. Its population is 94 (2022).
