= Karakuyu, Korkuteli =

Karakuyu
- Neighbourhood
- Location in Turkey
- Coordinates: 37.2239°N 30.4075°E
- Country: Turkey
- Province: Antalya
- District: Korkuteli
- Population (2022): 222
- Time zone: UTC+3 (TRT)

Karakuyu is a neighbourhood in the municipality and district of Korkuteli, Antalya Province, Turkey. Its population is 222 (2022).
