= Kırkpınar, Korkuteli =

Kırkpınar
- Neighbourhood
- Location in Turkey
- Coordinates: 37.1448°N 29.9123°E
- Country: Turkey
- Province: Antalya
- District: Korkuteli
- Population (2022): 397
- Time zone: UTC+3 (TRT)

Kırkpınar is a neighbourhood in the municipality and district of Korkuteli, Antalya Province, Turkey. Its population is 397 (2022).
