= Söğütcük, Korkuteli =

Söğütcük
- Neighbourhood
- Location in Turkey
- Coordinates: 37.0335°N 30.3836°E
- Country: Turkey
- Province: Antalya
- District: Korkuteli
- Population (2022): 159
- Time zone: UTC+3 (TRT)

Söğütcük is a neighbourhood in the municipality and district of Korkuteli, Antalya Province, Turkey. Its population is 159 (2022).
