= Sülekler, Korkuteli =

Sülekler
- Neighbourhood
- Location in Turkey
- Coordinates: 37°07′12″N 30°05′38″E
- Country: Turkey
- Province: Antalya
- District: Korkuteli
- Population (2022): 1,076
- Time zone: UTC+3 (TRT)

Sülekler is a neighbourhood in the municipality and district of Korkuteli, Antalya Province, Turkey. Its population is 1,076 (2022).
