= Belenli, Kaş =

Belenli
- Neighbourhood
- Location in Turkey
- Coordinates: 36.2011°N 29.6967°E
- Country: Turkey
- Province: Antalya
- District: Kaş
- Population (2022): 751
- Time zone: UTC+3 (TRT)

Belenli is a neighbourhood in the municipality and district of Kaş, Antalya Province, Turkey. Its population is 751 (2022). Nearby is the site of the ancient city of Isinda.
