= Yeşiloba, Korkuteli =

Yeşiloba
- Neighbourhood
- Location in Turkey
- Coordinates: 37.0540°N 29.8484°E
- Country: Turkey
- Province: Antalya
- District: Korkuteli
- Population (2022): 132
- Time zone: UTC+3 (TRT)

Yeşiloba is a neighbourhood in the municipality and district of Korkuteli, Antalya Province, Turkey. Its population is 132 (2022).

== Population ==
Historical population
Year	Pop.	±% p.a.
1997	136	—
2007	173	+2.44%
2012	130	−5.55%
2017	119	−1.75%
2022	132	+2.10%
Source: 1997 census and TÜIK (2007-2022)
