= Çomaklı, Korkuteli =

Çomaklı
- Neighbourhood
- Location in Turkey
- Coordinates: 37°20′N 30°13′E
- Country: Turkey
- Province: Antalya
- District: Korkuteli
- Population (2022): 891
- Time zone: UTC+3 (TRT)

Çomaklı is a neighbourhood in the municipality and district of Korkuteli, Antalya Province, Turkey. Its population is 891 (2022). Before the 2013 reorganisation, it was a town (belde).
