= Korkuteli =

- District and municipality
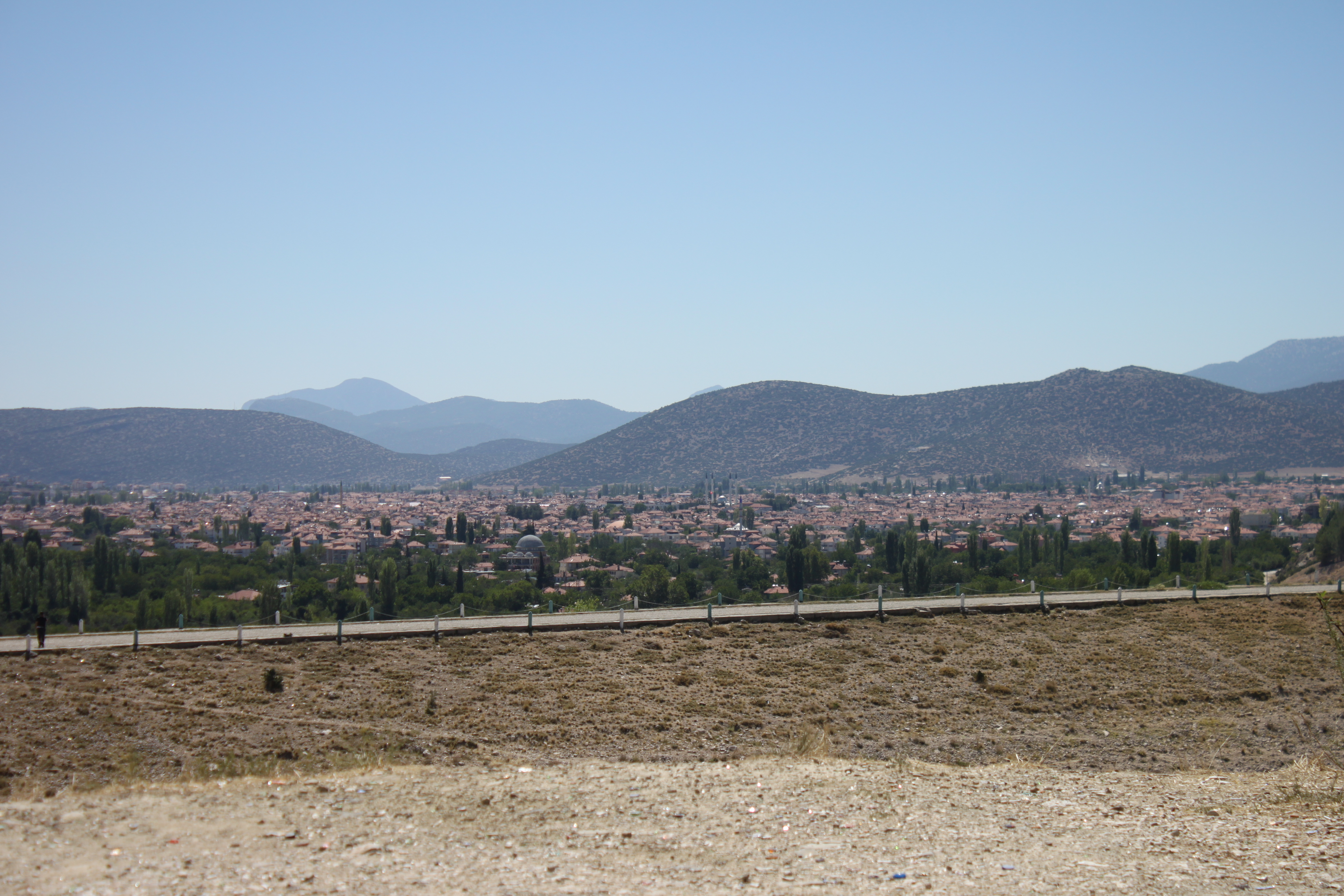
- Korkuteli; east view of the city from the dam.

- Map showing Korkuteli District in Antalya Province

- Location within Turkey
- Coordinates: 37°04′N 30°12′E
- Country: Turkey
- Province: Antalya

Government
  - Mayor: Saniye Caran (CHP)
- Area: 2,433 km^{2} (939 sq mi)
- Elevation: 1,020 m (3,350 ft)
- Population (2022): 56,285
  - Density: 23.13/km^{2} (59.92/sq mi)
- Time zone: UTC+3 (TRT)
- Postal code: 07800
- Area code: 0242
- Website: www.korkuteli.bel.tr

Korkuteli is a municipality and district of Antalya Province, Turkey. Its area is 2,433 km^{2}, and its population is 56,285 (2022). It is 56 km (35 mi) north-west of the city of Antalya. It was previously called İstanoz or Stenez.

== Etymology ==
Its modern name comes from Korkut, an Ottoman prince, who was murdered by his brother Selim I while trying to hide in a cave in the district.

== Geography ==
Korkuteli is an area of small plains and hills in the Bey Dağları, the western range of the Taurus Mountains, overlooking the Mediterranean sea. There are two distinct geographical areas of Korkuteli, of equal size: the lowland area nearer the coast has a hot Mediterranean climate, while the larger area of lakes higher up is cooler and less humid. The high country is covered with pine forest, while the lowland is used for agriculture; crops include grains, pulses and vegetable oil-seeds. There are trout in Korkuteli reservoir and other small lakes.

Until recently economic activity in this district was basically herding sheep and goats on the hillsides, but since the 1960s investment in irrigation and machinery has generated a thriving fruit-growing industry, including many roadside stalls selling fruit to travellers en route to the Mediterranean coast. This in turn has led to better buildings and infrastructure in the town of Korkuteli and the villages in the district. There is no industry or large-scale trading. Korkuteli is a small town of 15,000 people providing high schools and other basic infrastructure to the district.

The countryside is attractive and Antalya's middle-classes are building holiday homes in Korkuteli, a place to escape the summer heat on the coast. The local delicacy is 'burnt ice-cream', made of goats-milk.

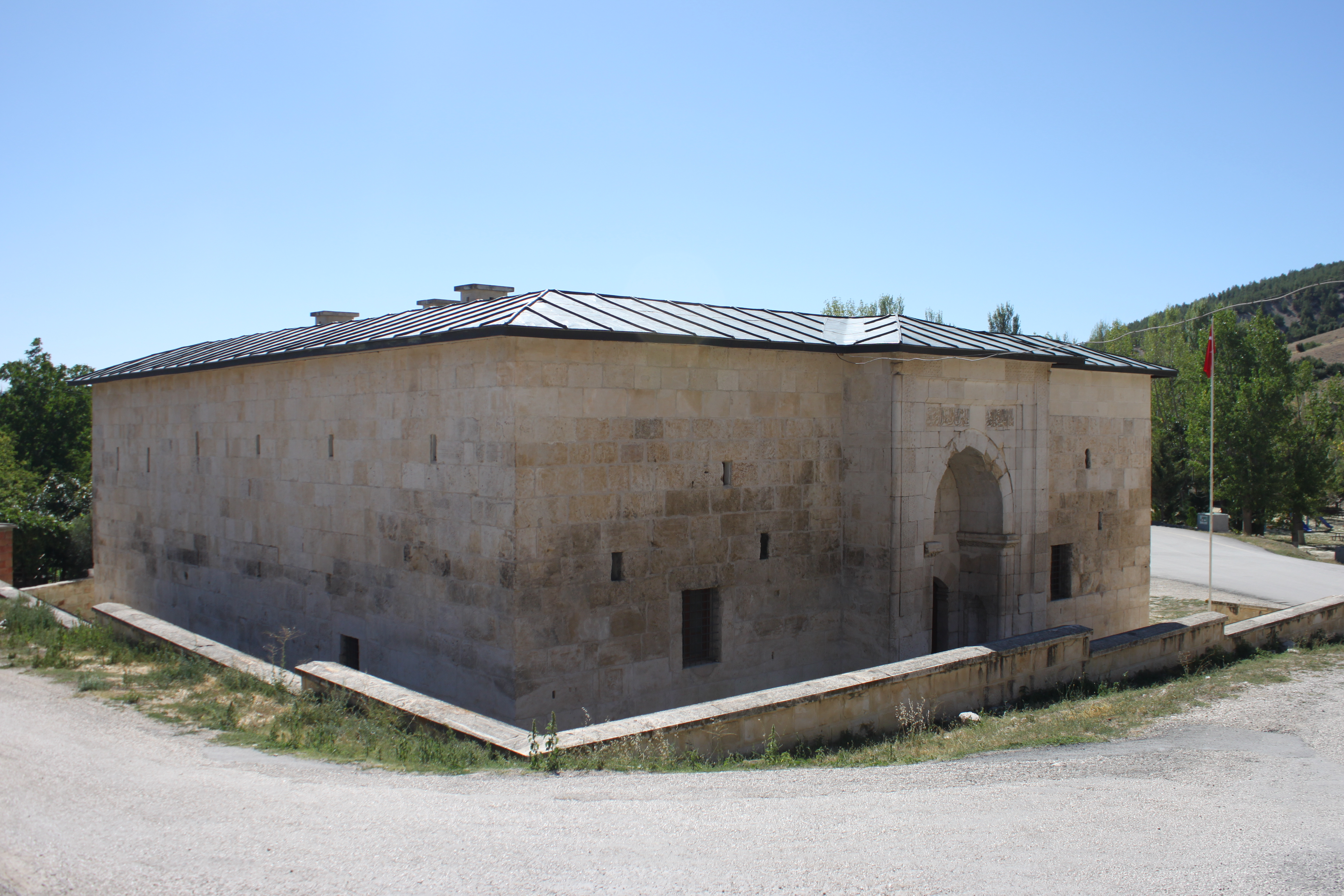
Kur'an school in Korkuteli, built at the beginning of the 13th century under Sultan Kayqubad I.

Korkuteli has a hot-summer Mediterranean climate (Köppen: Csa), with hot, dry summers, and chilly, damp, and occasionally snowy winters.

Climate data for Korkuteli (1991–2020)
Month	Jan	Feb	Mar	Apr	May	Jun	Jul	Aug	Sep	Oct	Nov	Dec	Year
Mean daily maximum °C (°F)	8.9 (48.0)	10.1 (50.2)	13.7 (56.7)	17.9 (64.2)	23.2 (73.8)	28.5 (83.3)	32.2 (90.0)	32.4 (90.3)	28.4 (83.1)	22.6 (72.7)	16.0 (60.8)	10.6 (51.1)	20.4 (68.7)
Daily mean °C (°F)	2.8 (37.0)	3.9 (39.0)	7.0 (44.6)	11.0 (51.8)	16.0 (60.8)	20.9 (69.6)	24.4 (75.9)	24.1 (75.4)	19.9 (67.8)	14.4 (57.9)	8.3 (46.9)	4.3 (39.7)	13.1 (55.6)
Mean daily minimum °C (°F)	−1.6 (29.1)	−0.8 (30.6)	1.5 (34.7)	5.0 (41.0)	9.3 (48.7)	13.5 (56.3)	16.6 (61.9)	16.4 (61.5)	12.3 (54.1)	7.7 (45.9)	2.8 (37.0)	−0.1 (31.8)	6.9 (44.4)
Average precipitation mm (inches)	55.58 (2.19)	33.74 (1.33)	37.03 (1.46)	40.63 (1.60)	39.29 (1.55)	28.35 (1.12)	9.45 (0.37)	9.64 (0.38)	10.91 (0.43)	27.99 (1.10)	39.0 (1.54)	59.73 (2.35)	391.34 (15.41)
Average precipitation days (≥ 1.0 mm)	6.1	5.2	4.9	5.7	5.8	4.8	2.0	2.3	2.9	3.4	4.1	6.2	53.4
Average relative humidity (%)	70.0	67.6	62.5	60.9	58.3	50.0	43.9	46.2	50.2	58.3	65.5	71.4	58.7
Source: NOAA

== Composition ==
There are 59 neighbourhoods in Korkuteli District:

- Akyar
- Alaaddin
- Aşağıpazar
- Avdan
- Bahçeyaka
- Bayat
- Bayatbademleri
- Beğiş
- Bozova
- Büyükköy
- Çaykenarı
- Çıvgalar
- Çomaklı
- Çukurca
- Dereköy
- Duraliler
- Esenyurt
- Garipçe
- Göçerler
- Güzle
- İmecik
- İmrahor
- Karabayır
- Karakuyu
- Karataş
- Kargalık
- Kargın
- Karşıyaka
- Kayabaşı
- Kemerağzı
- Kevzer
- Kiremitli
- Kırkpınar
- Kızılaliler
- Kızılcadağ
- Köseler
- Kozağacı
- Küçükköy
- Küçüklü
- Leylek
- Mamatlar
- Manay
- Nebiler
- Osmankalfalar
- Sımandır
- Söğütcük
- Sülekler
- Taşkesiği
- Tatköy
- Uzunoluk
- Yakaköy
- Yalınlıgediği
- Yazır
- Yeleme
- Yelten
- Yeni
- Yeşiloba
- Yeşilyayla
- Yukarıkaraman

== History ==
Buildings of the Roman and Byzantine periods in Korkuteli include the Keşiş Evi ("priest's house") and the building that later became the Hamidoglu Medrese, which has Latin inscriptions.

The area was taken from the Byzantines by the Seljuk Turks of Gıyaseddin Keyhüsrev I in 1207, and was used as a summer residence by the local Seljuk rulers. Seljuk architecture in Korkuteli includes the mosque of Sultan Alaadin and some hamams ("Turkish baths") and tombs.

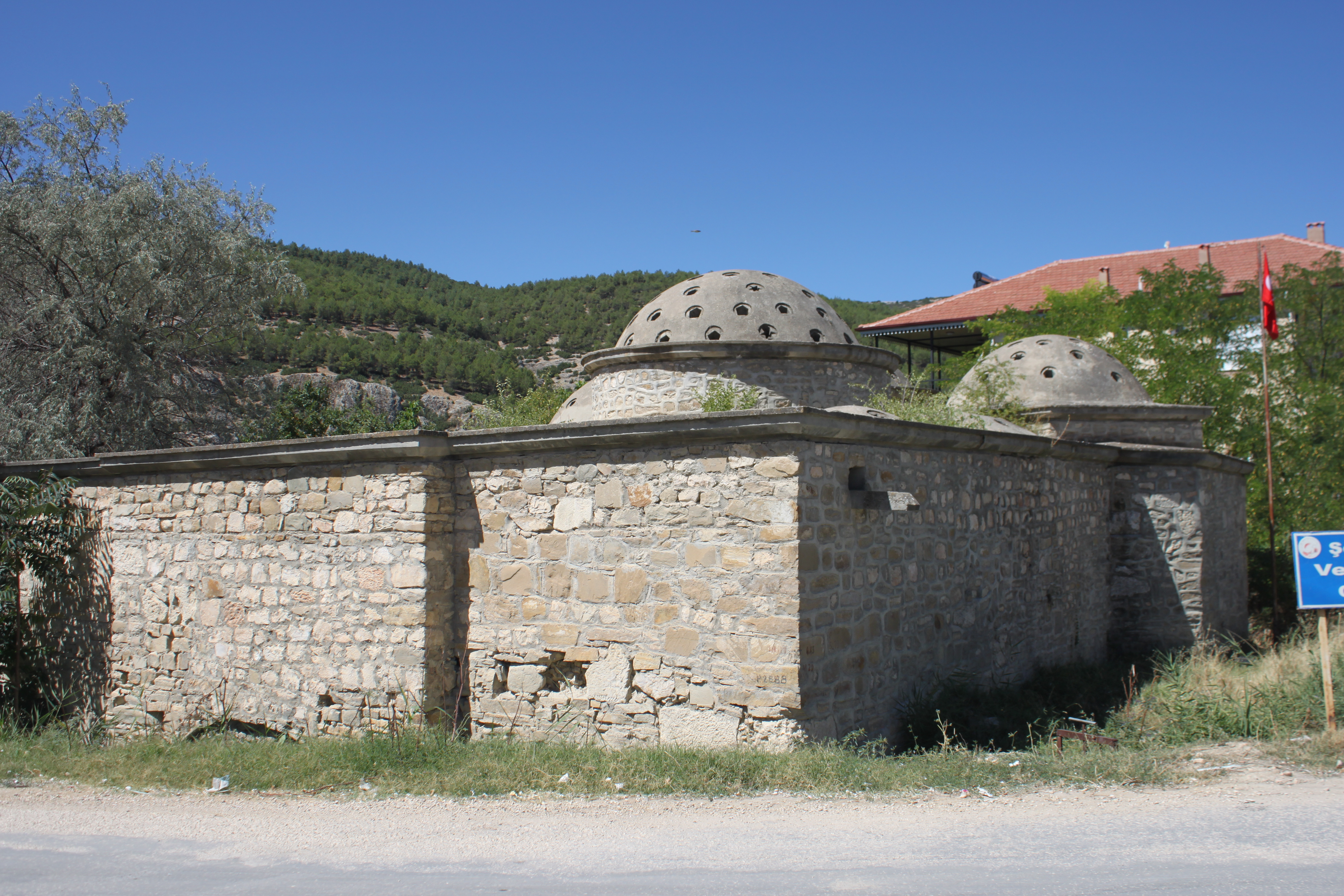
Korkuteli; the Tarihi Hamam; ("historical bath") from the Seljuk period, 13th century.

Upon the decline of the Seljuks in the early 14th century the area became a stronghold of the Beylik of Teke and then of the Hamidid clan of nearby Isparta. Bayezid I brought the district into the Ottoman Empire in 1392.

== Isinda ==
Nearby was the ancient town of Isinda, whose site is now thought to be at the village of Kişla, though formerly identified with Yazır. In the 1840s, T.A.B. Spratt and E. Forbes visited Kişla, an hour's ride from Korkuteli (referred to as Stenez), with extensive walls of soft stone and burnt brick, and identified it as the city of Isinda, which the Roman consul Gnaeus Manlius Vulso, on his victorious march through Asia Minor in 189 BC, found besieged by Termessus. At the city's request he raised the siege and fined the Termessians 50 talents.

Isinda stood in a strategic position at the western end of the pass leading from Pamphylia by Termessus to Pisidia. Together with Aperlae, Apollonia and Simena, Isinda was a member of a tetrapolis, a federation of four cities.

Samples of the extensive coinage of Isinda are extant, which give evidence that it considered itself an Ionian colony.

Isinda was later included in the Roman province of Pamphylia Secunda. At an early stage, it became a Christian bishopric, a suffragan of the metropolitan see of Perge, the capital of the province. Of its bishops, Cyrillus took part in the First Council of Nicaea in 325, Edesius in the Council of Ephesus in 431, Marcellinus in the Council of Chalcedon in 451, Talleleus in the Second Council of Constantinople in 553, Ignatius in the Photian Council of Constantinople (879).

No longer a residential bishopric, Isinda is now listed by the Catholic Church as a titular see.

== Demographics ==
The district has a population of 56,285 (2022). The town itself has 28,725 inhabitants.
