= Leylek, Korkuteli =

Leylek
- Neighbourhood
- Location in Turkey
- Coordinates: 37°14′56″N 30°23′49″E
- Country: Turkey
- Province: Antalya
- District: Korkuteli
- Population (2022): 138
- Time zone: UTC+3 (TRT)

Leylek (also: Leylekköy) is a neighbourhood in the municipality and district of Korkuteli, Antalya Province, Turkey. Its population is 138 (2022).
