= Bayatbademleri, Korkuteli =

Bayatbademleri
- Neighbourhood
- Location in Turkey
- Coordinates: 37°04′N 30°28′E
- Country: Turkey
- Province: Antalya
- District: Korkuteli
- Population (2022): 298
- Time zone: UTC+3 (TRT)

Bayatbademleri is a neighbourhood in the municipality and district of Korkuteli, Antalya Province, Turkey. Its population is 298 (2022).
