= Köseler, Korkuteli =

Köseler
- Neighbourhood
- Location in Turkey
- Coordinates: 37.1481°N 30.3906°E
- Country: Turkey
- Province: Antalya
- District: Korkuteli
- Population (2022): 136
- Time zone: UTC+3 (TRT)

Köseler is a neighbourhood in the municipality and district of Korkuteli, Antalya Province, Turkey. Its population is 136 (2022).
