= Kargalık, Korkuteli =

Kargalık
- Neighbourhood
- Location in Turkey
- Coordinates: 37.0514°N 30.1811°E
- Country: Turkey
- Province: Antalya
- District: Korkuteli
- Population (2022): 1,238
- Time zone: UTC+3 (TRT)

Kargalık is a neighbourhood in the municipality and district of Korkuteli, Antalya Province, Turkey. Its population is 1,238 (2022).
