= İmecik, Korkuteli =

İmecik
- Neighbourhood
- Location in Turkey
- Coordinates: 36°51′N 30°13′E
- Country: Turkey
- Province: Antalya
- District: Korkuteli
- Population (2022): 655
- Time zone: UTC+3 (TRT)

İmecik is a neighbourhood in the municipality and district of Korkuteli, Antalya Province, Turkey. Its population is 655 (2022).
