= İmrahor, Korkuteli =

İmrahor
- Neighbourhood
- Location in Turkey
- Coordinates: 37.0534°N 30.2167°E
- Country: Turkey
- Province: Antalya
- District: Korkuteli
- Population (2022): 1,672
- Time zone: UTC+3 (TRT)

İmrahor is a neighbourhood in the municipality and district of Korkuteli, Antalya Province, Turkey. Its population is 1,672 (2022).
