= Yelten, Korkuteli =

Yelten
- Neighbourhood
- Location in Turkey
- Coordinates: 37.2200°N 30.2186°E
- Country: Turkey
- Province: Antalya
- District: Korkuteli
- Population (2022): 1,937
- Time zone: UTC+3 (TRT)

Yelten is a neighbourhood in the municipality and district of Korkuteli, Antalya Province, Turkey. Its population is 1,937 (2022). Before the 2013 reorganisation, it was a town (belde).
