= Güzle, Korkuteli =

Güzle
- Neighbourhood
- Location in Turkey
- Coordinates: 36.9006°N 30.3151°E
- Country: Turkey
- Province: Antalya
- District: Korkuteli
- Population (2022): 213
- Time zone: UTC+3 (TRT)

Güzle is a neighbourhood in the municipality and district of Korkuteli, Antalya Province, Turkey. Its population is 213 (2022).
