= Kızılcadağ, Korkuteli =

Kızılcadağ
- Neighbourhood
- Location in Turkey
- Coordinates: 37°01′N 29°58′E
- Country: Turkey
- Province: Antalya
- District: Korkuteli
- Population (2022): 255
- Time zone: UTC+3 (TRT)

Kızılcadağ is a neighbourhood in the municipality and district of Korkuteli, Antalya Province, Turkey. Its population is 255 (2022).
