= Nebiler, Korkuteli =

Nebiler
- Neighbourhood
- Location in Turkey
- Coordinates: 36.9758°N 30.0097°E
- Country: Turkey
- Province: Antalya
- District: Korkuteli
- Population (2022): 83
- Time zone: UTC+3 (TRT)

Nebiler is a neighbourhood in the municipality and district of Korkuteli, Antalya Province, Turkey. Its population is 83 (2022).
