= Kozağacı, Korkuteli =

Kozağacı
- Neighbourhood
- Location in Turkey
- Coordinates: 36.9511°N 29.9194°E
- Country: Turkey
- Province: Antalya
- District: Korkuteli
- Population (2022): 423
- Time zone: UTC+3 (TRT)

Kozağacı is a neighbourhood in the municipality and district of Korkuteli, Antalya Province, Turkey. Its population is 423 (2022).
