= Bozova, Korkuteli =

Bozova
- Neighbourhood
- Location in Turkey
- Coordinates: 37.2161°N 30.2858°E
- Country: Turkey
- Province: Antalya
- District: Korkuteli
- Population (2022): 935
- Time zone: UTC+3 (TRT)

Bozova is a neighbourhood in the municipality and district of Korkuteli, Antalya Province, Turkey. Its population is 935 (2022). Before the 2013 reorganisation, it was a town (belde).
