= Simena =

Ancient Lycian town in Turkey

- Σίμηνα (Ancient Greek)
- Somena
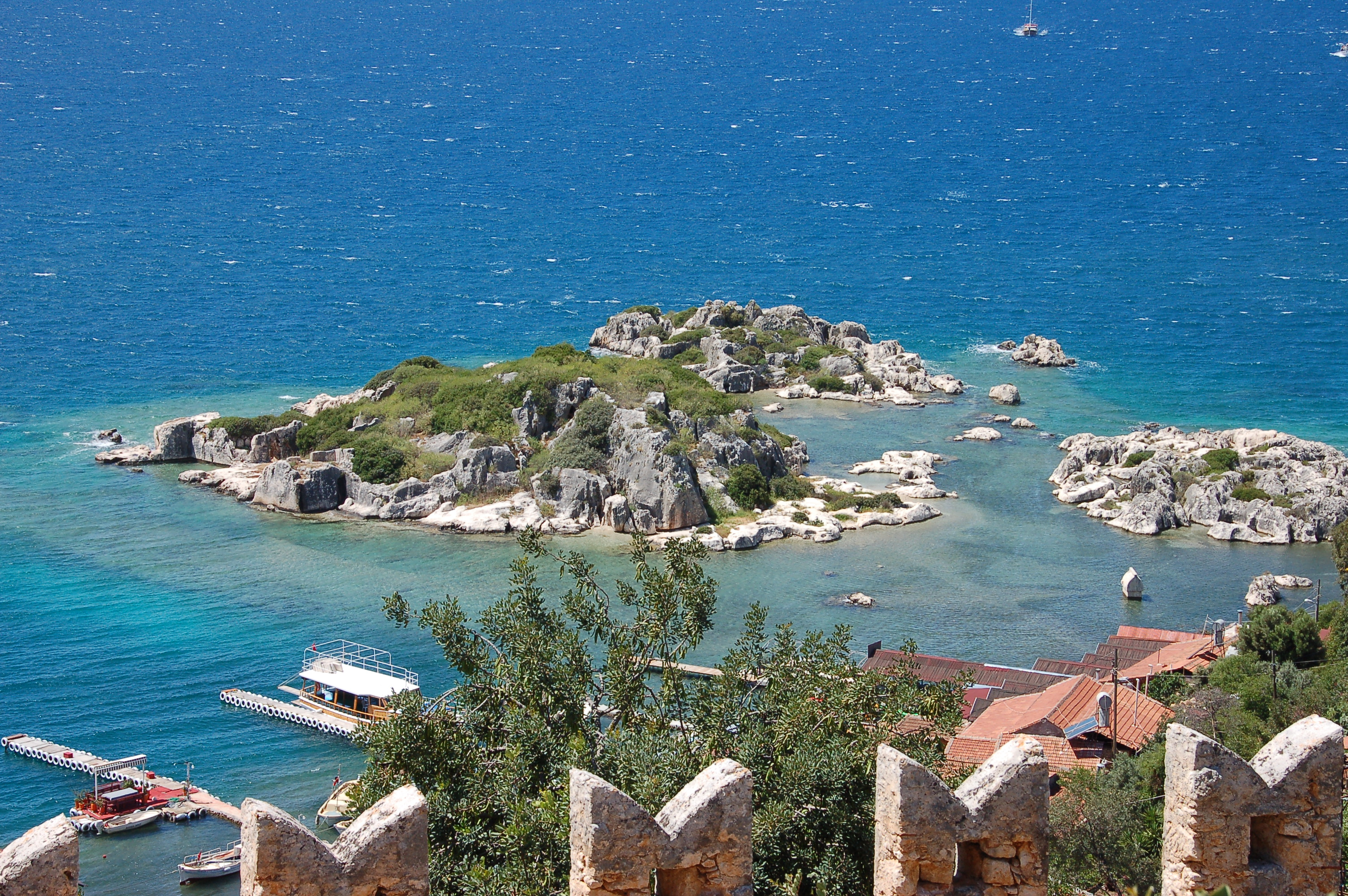
- Sunken city of Simena

- Location within Turkey
- 36°11′24.59″N 29°51′35.25″E
- Type: Ancient settlement
- Location: Demre, Antalya Province, Turkey
- Region: Lycia

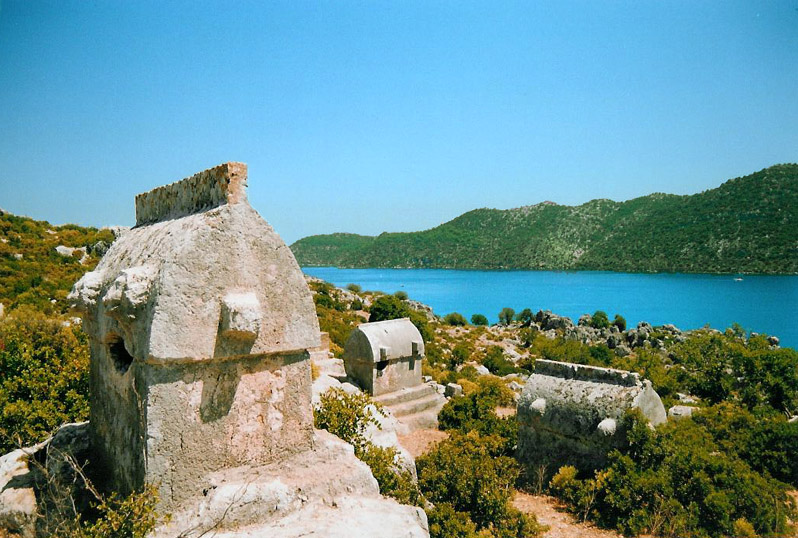
Ancient Lycian tombs

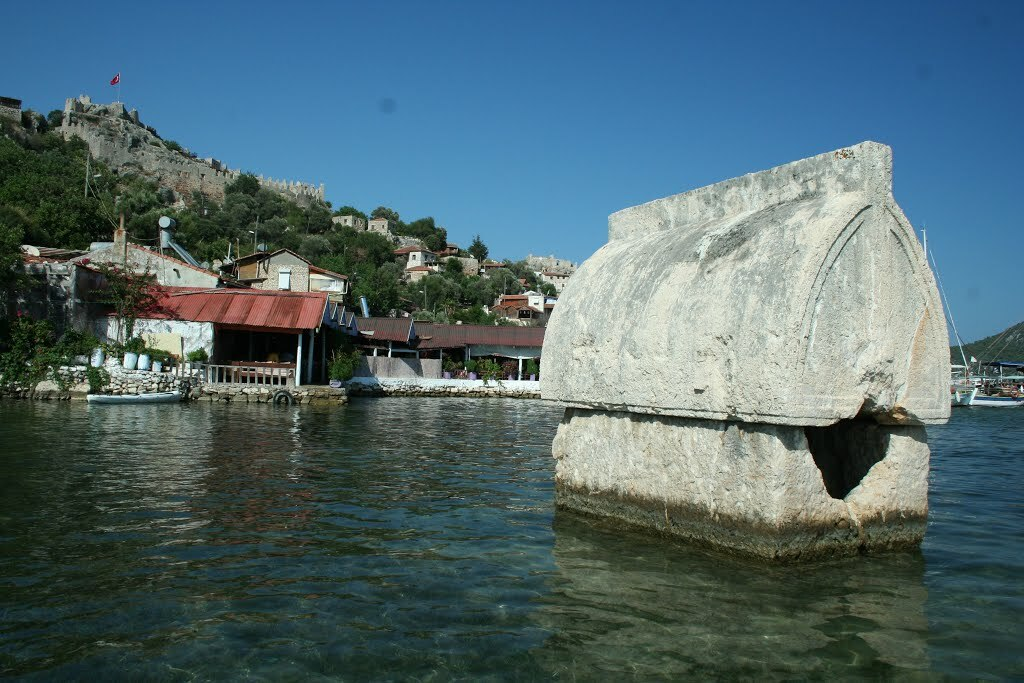
Submerged Lycian tomb

Simena (Ancient Greek: Σίμηνα) was a town on the coast of ancient Lycia, located 60 stadia from Aperlae. The Stadiasmus Maris Magni calls the town Somena (Σόμηνα).

Its site is located near Kaleköy, Turkey. Grave inscriptions and coin finds indicate that the town existed in the fourth century BC. Part of the ancient city is now submerged in the sea and remains of the Titus thermal baths lie in the water. A small theatre or bouleuterion on the acropolis within the later fort and carved into the rock can be seen.
