= Sympoliteia =

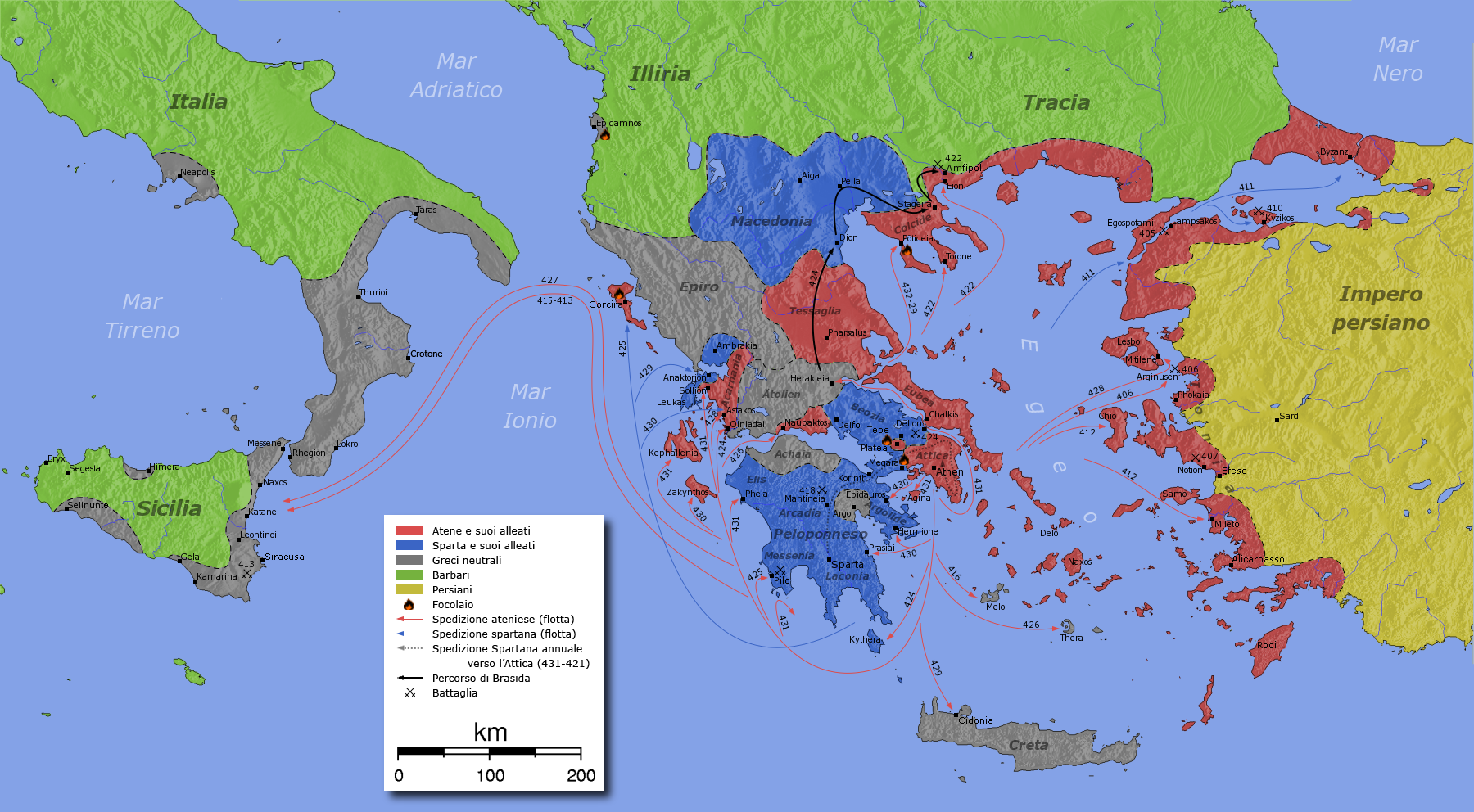
Map illustrating the various alliances of the Peloponnesian Wars

A sympoliteia (Greek: συμπολιτεία, lit. 'joint citizenship'), anglicized as sympolity, was a type of treaty for political organization in ancient Greece. By the time of the Hellenistic period, it occurred in two forms. In mainland Greece, the term was often used for a federal state consisting of individual poleis (city-states) with shared political institutions and citizenship. Examples of this are the Achaean League and the Aetolian League. The term was also used for the political merger of two or more neighboring poleis. This could eventually, but not necessarily, lead to the disappearance of one of the participating poleis. This second form was especially common in Hellenistic Asia Minor.

A sympoliteia is often contrasted with an isopoliteia, a treaty which granted equal citizenship to the citizens of the participating poleis but maintained their political independence. Contemporary writers of the Hellenistic period could use the term loosely, Polybius for example used the term sympoliteia to refer to the shared citizenship granted by both treaties. In similar fashion there was also considerable overlap between the concepts of synoecism and sympoliteia.

== The Delian League ==
Map of the Delian League, 431 BCE.

The Athenian Empire, also known as the Delian League, was a collection of Greek city-states largely based around the Aegean Sea which operated under the hegemony of Athens. This alliance initially served the purpose of coordinating a united Greek front against a perceived looming Persian threat against the Ionian city-states which bordered it. The members of the Delian League were made to swear an oath of loyalty to the league and contributed mostly monetarily but in some instances donated ships or other forces. It was also the case that many democratic members of the League owed their freedom from oligarchic or tyrannical rule to Athens. Because of this, Athens gained an overwhelming advantage in the voting system conducted by relying on the support of democratic city-states Athens had helped into being. By 454 Athens moved the treasury of the Delian League from the Island of Delos to the Parthenon in Athens. Benefitting greatly from the influx of cash coming out of the 150-330 members, Athens used the money to reinforce its own naval supremacy and used the remaining funds to embellish the city with art and architecture. In order to maintain the new synoecism, Athens began using its greatly expanded military to enforce membership in the League. City-states who wished to leave the alliance were punished by Athens with force such as happened to Mytilene and Melos. No longer considered her allies, Athens eventually began to refer to the members of the Delian League as "all the cities Athens rules." Athens also extended its authority over members of the League through judicial decisions. Synoecism under the Athenian Empire was enforced by resolving matters of and between states in Athens by courts composed of Athenian citizens and enforcing those decisions through the Athenian military.

== See also ==
- Koinon

== Sources ==
- Reger, Gary (2004). "Sympoliteiai in Hellenistic Asia Minor". In Colvin, Stephen (ed.). The Greco-Roman East: Politics, Culture, Society. Yale Classical Studies. Vol. 31. Cambridge, UK: Cambridge University Press. pp. 145–181. ISBN 9780521828758.
