= Yerköprü Waterfall =

Yerköprü Waterfall refers to:

- Yerköprü Waterfall (Konya), a waterfall in Hadim district of Konya Province
- Yerköprü Waterfall (Mersin), a waterfall in Mut district of Mersin Province
