= Cibyra Minor =

Town in ancient Pamphylia

Coordinates: 36°39′35″N 31°39′35″E

Cibyra (Greek: Κιβύρα) also referred to as Cibyra Minor to distinguish it from Cibyra Magna, was a town in ancient Pamphylia. Strabo, after mentioning Side, says, "...and near it is the coast of the little Cibyratae, and then the river Melas, and a station for ships". The site of Side is well known. The Melas is the Manavgat River, 4 miles (6.4 km) east of Side. But there could have been no city between Side and the Melas, and it is conjectured that in Strabo's text, the coast ("Paralia") of the Cibyratae should come after the Melas. The vestiges of Cibyra are probably those observed by Captain Beaufort upon a height which rises from the right bank of a considerable river about 8 miles (13 km) to the eastward of the Melas, about 4 miles (6.4 km) to the west of Cape Karáburun, and nearly 2 miles (3.2 km) from the shore. Ptolemy mentions this Cibyra among the inland towns of Cilicia Trachea; but Scylax places it on the coast. There is a place, Cyberna (Κυβέρνη), mentioned in the Stadiasmus, which is placed 59 stadia east of the Melas. If the conjecture as to Strabo's text is correct, we may identify Cyberna with this Cibyra of Pamphylia.
