= Ohtamış Waterfall =

Ohtamış Waterfall Ohtamış Şelalesi
- Location within Turkey
- Location: Ohtamış, Ulubey, Ordu Province, Turkey
- Coordinates: 40°40.8113′N 37°37.6618′E
- Total height: 30 m (98 ft)

Ohtamış Waterfall (Turkish: Ohtamış Şelalesi) is a waterfall in Ordu Province, northern Turkey.

Ohtamış Waterfall is located in the Ohtamış village of Ulubey district in Ordu Province. It is 38 km (24 mi) distant from Ordu and about 20 km (12 mi) from Ulubey.

Ohtamış Waterfall falls from a height of 30 m (98 ft) at almost right angle, and it is so the biggest waterfall in the Black Sea Region.

== See also ==
- List of waterfalls
- List of waterfalls in Turkey
