= List of waterfalls in Turkey =

Main waterfalls of Turkey are listed below:

Waterfall	Province	River	Image
Çır Waterfall	Bingöl	Uzundere	
Doğançay Waterfall	Sakarya		
Düden Waterfalls	Antalya	Düden	
Göksu Waterfall	Sivas	Göksu	
Güney Waterfall	Denizli		
Gürlevik Waterfalls	Erzincan		
Gürleyik Waterfall	Eskişehir		
Ilısu Waterfall	Mersin		
Kapuzbaşı Waterfall	Kayseri		
Kurşunlu Waterfall	Antalya	Aksu	
Manavgat Waterfall	Antalya	Manavgat	
Mençuna Waterfall	Artvin		
Asmasu Waterfall	Trabzon	Araklı	
Ohtamış Waterfall	Ordu		
Samandere Waterfall	Düzce	Uğur	
Tarsus Waterfall	Mersin	Berdan	
Tatlıca Waterfalls	Sinop	Göksu River	
Tortum Waterfall	Erzurum	Tortum	
Yerköprü Waterfall (Konya)	Konya	Göksu	
Yerköprü Waterfall (Mersin)	Mersin	Ermenek Creek (Göksu)	

== See also ==
- List of waterfalls
