= Tatlıca Waterfalls =

Series of waterfalls in Sinop, Turkey

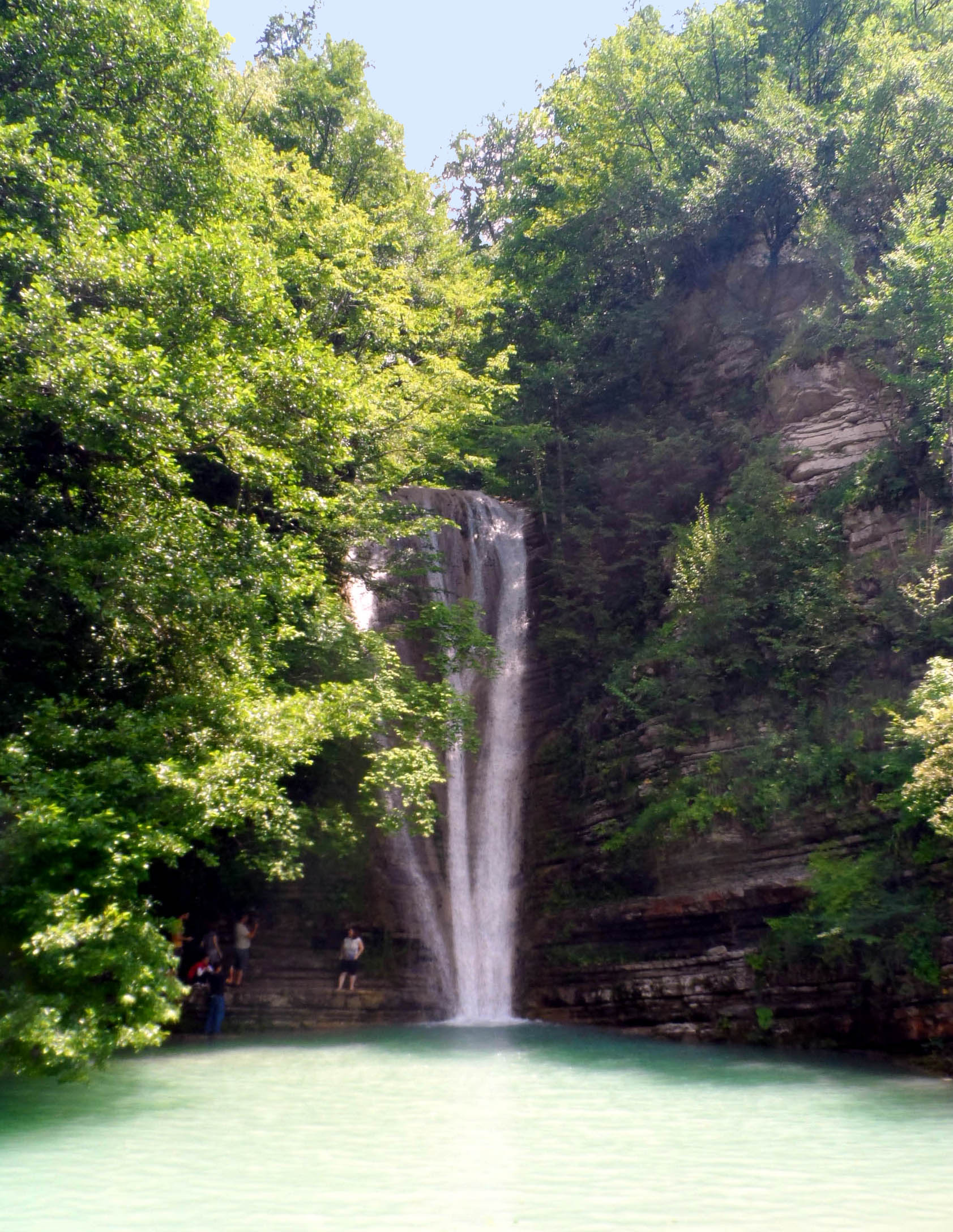
Tatlıca Waterfalls

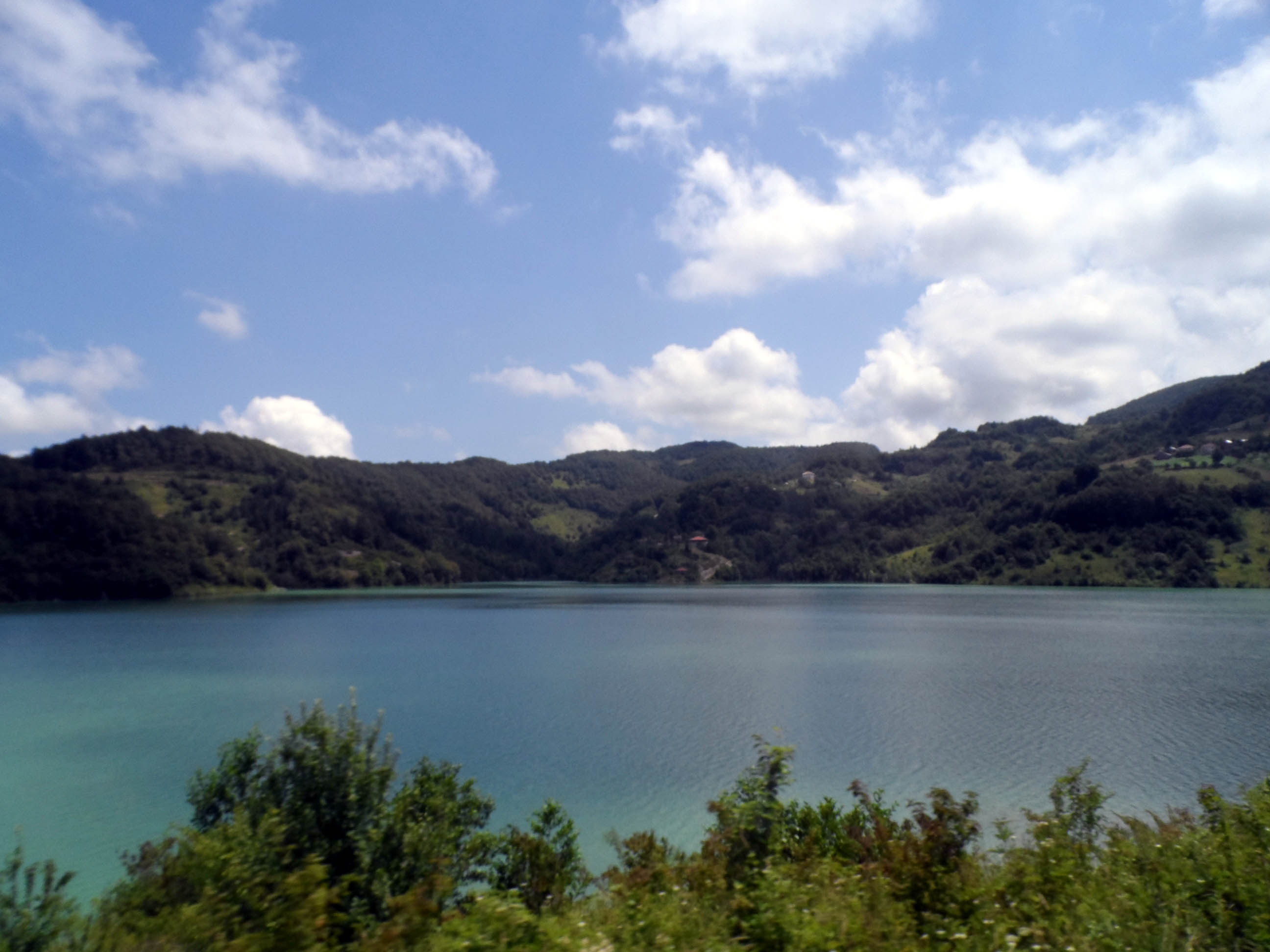
Erfelek Dam from the road to Tatlıca Waterfalls

Tatlıca Waterfalls is a series of waterfalls in Sinop Province, north Turkey.

== Geography ==
Administratively, Tatlıca Waterfalls are in the rural area of Ayancık ilçe (district ) of Sinop Province. But the shortest road to the waterfalls is via Erfelek ilçe and they are considered as a part of Erfelek. At 41°50′10″N 34°46′44″E its distance to Erfelek is 17 kilometres (11 mi), to Sinop is 42 kilometres (26 mi) and to Ayancık is 86 kilometres (53 mi). The road from Erfelek to the waterfalls runs along the west coast of Erfelek Dam reservoir.

== The falls ==
There are 28 small waterfalls in cascade. The source of the waterfall is Karasu creek which is a low capacity creek with high potential energy due to relatively high ramp of the stream bed which is 17%. The water falls in a hanging valley.

It is possible to climb up within the waterfall to a certain height. But now a staircase has been added next to the waterfall and it is possible to climb up without getting wet.

== The management ==
In 2011 the waterfalls were handed over to Ministry of Forestry and they were included in the List of nature parks of Turkey. The total area of the nature park is 453.09 decares (0.45309 km^{2}; 0.17494 sq mi) including the area allocated to picnickers.

== See also ==
- List of waterfalls
- List of waterfalls in Turkey
