= Gürleyik =

Gürleyik can refer to:

- Gürleyik, Honaz
- Gürleyik Waterfall
