= Yerköprü Waterfall (Mersin) =

Yerköprü Waterfall Yerköprü Şelalesi
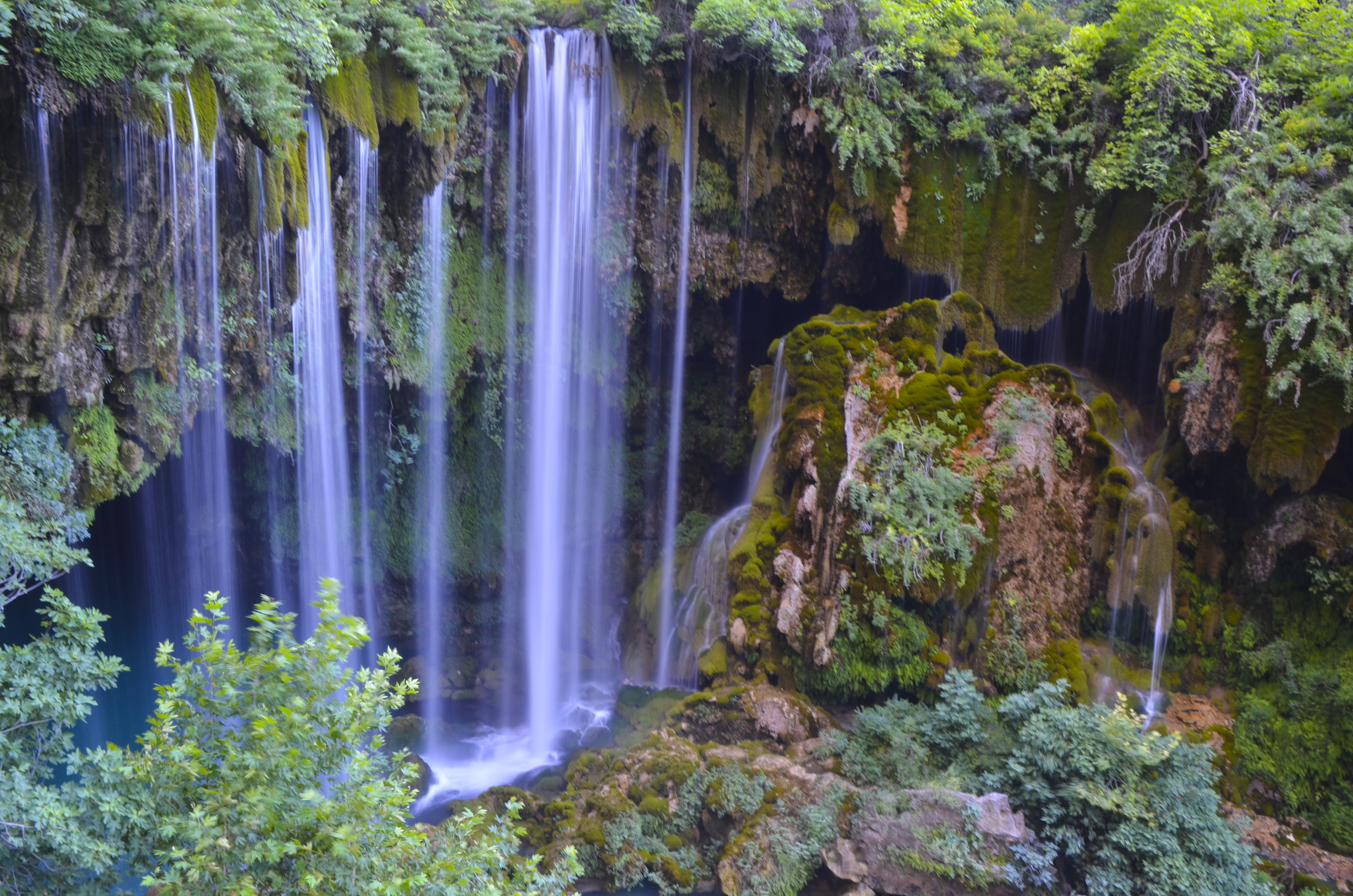
- Yerköprü Waterfall

- Location within Turkey
- Location: Mut, Mersin Province, Turkey
- Coordinates: 36°32′04″N 33°13′56″E
- Total height: ~ 30 m (98 ft)
- Watercourse: Ermenek Creek, a tributary of Göksu River

Yerköprü Waterfall (Turkish: Yerköprü Şelalesi) is a waterfall in Mersin Province, southern Turkey. It is a registered natural monument.

== Location and access ==
The waterfall is located to the north of Kuskan village of Gülnar ilçe (district) in Mersin Province, But it is accessible from Mut ilçe. It is situated to the southeast of Gezende Dam. Its distance to Mut is 35 km (22 mi) and to Mersin is 182 kilometres (113 mi)

In early March 2013, the road leading to the waterfall was blocked by rocks due to a landslide. After almost two years, construction works began for access to the waterfall on the other bank of the creek. It can be reached by a wooden staircase down from a bridge over the creek.

The site is a popular tourist attraction. Admission is collected for visitors and vehicles.

== Waterfall ==
The waterfall is on the Ermenek Creek, a tributary of the Göksu River. It was formed in a deep canyon by a narrow spring emerged in faults of Cretaceous-period limestone formation rocks, which are about 110 million years old. It is fed by an underground water tunnel of about 200–250 m (660–820 ft) length, and 10 m (33 ft) width, a cave with stalactites and a rich vegetation. Water from the Gezende Dam join the spring water in the cave.

In 2001, the waterfall, covering an area of 1,115.72 da (120,095 sq ft), was registered as a natural monument by the Nature Reserve and Nature Parks Administration of the Ministry of Forest and Water Management.

== Gallery ==
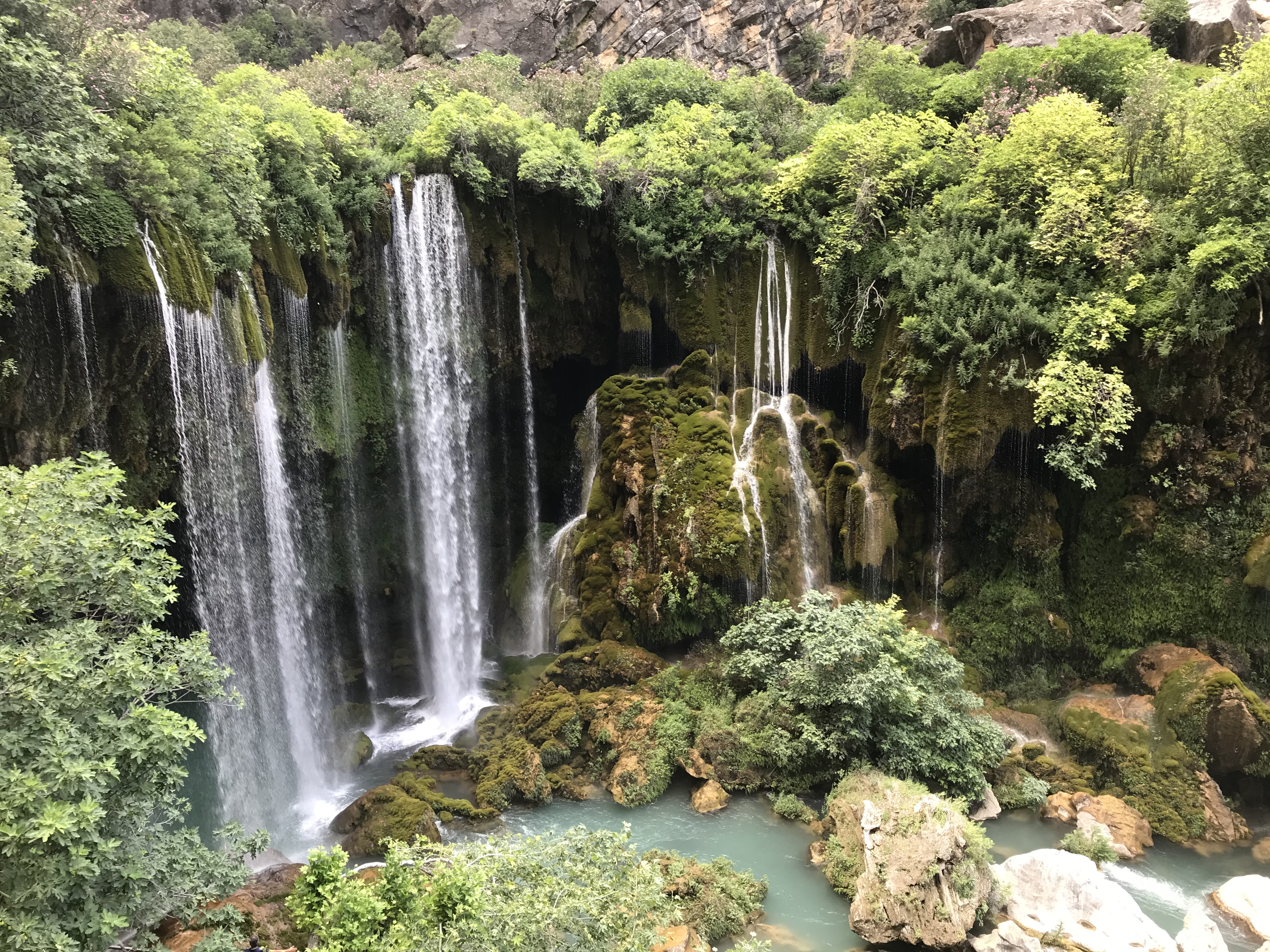
Yerköprü Falls

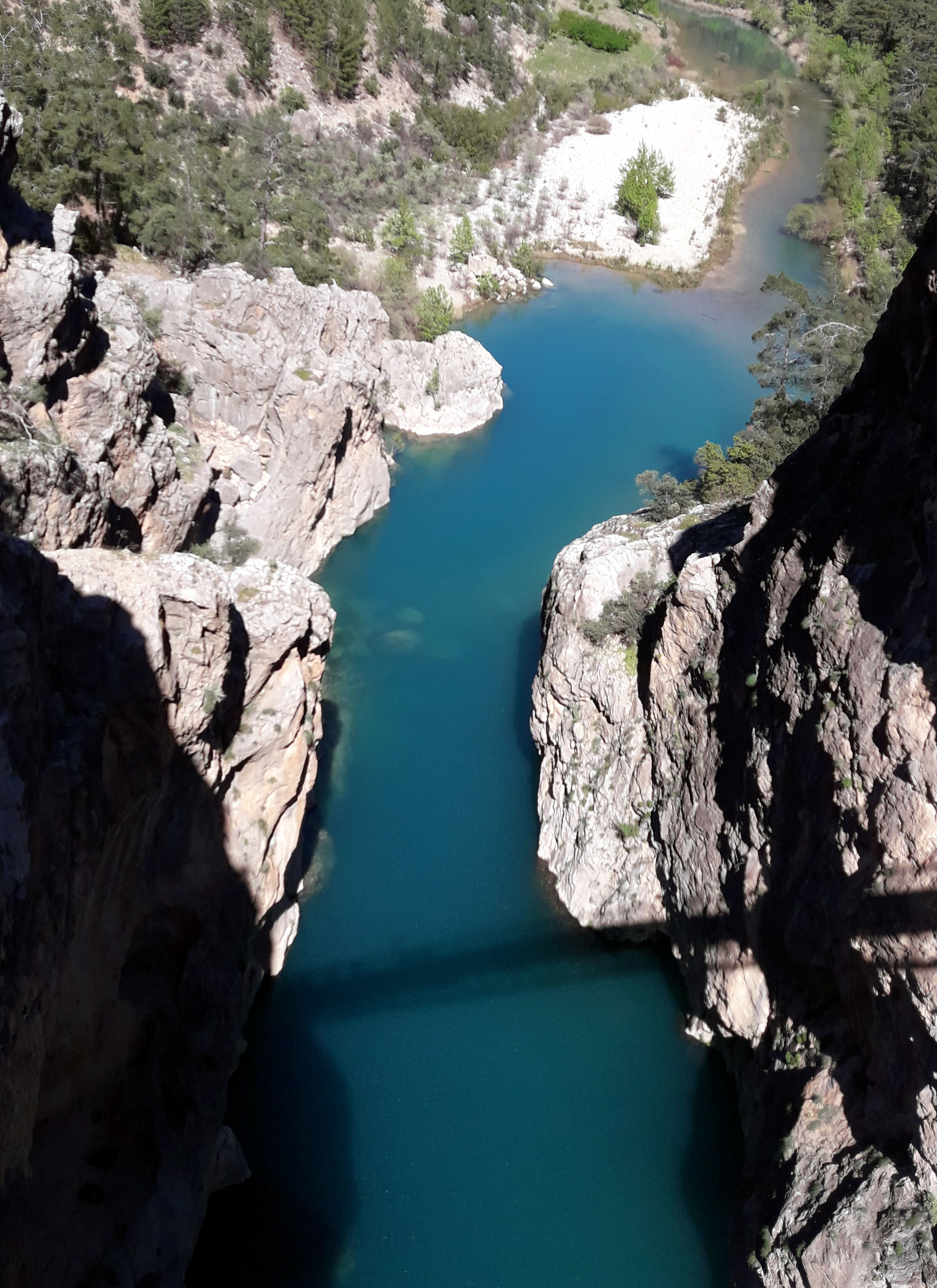
Yerköprü Canyon

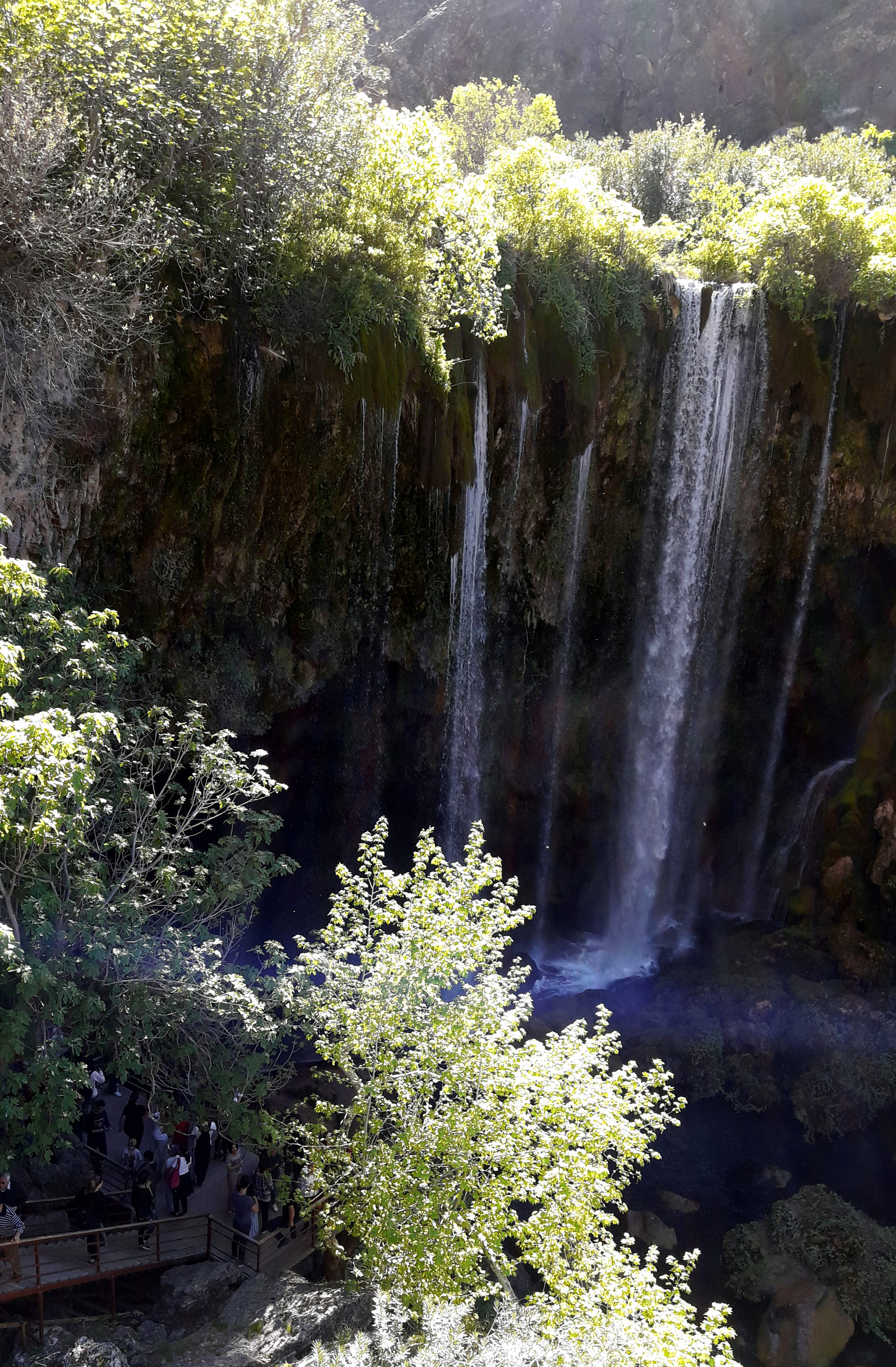
Yerköprü Falls

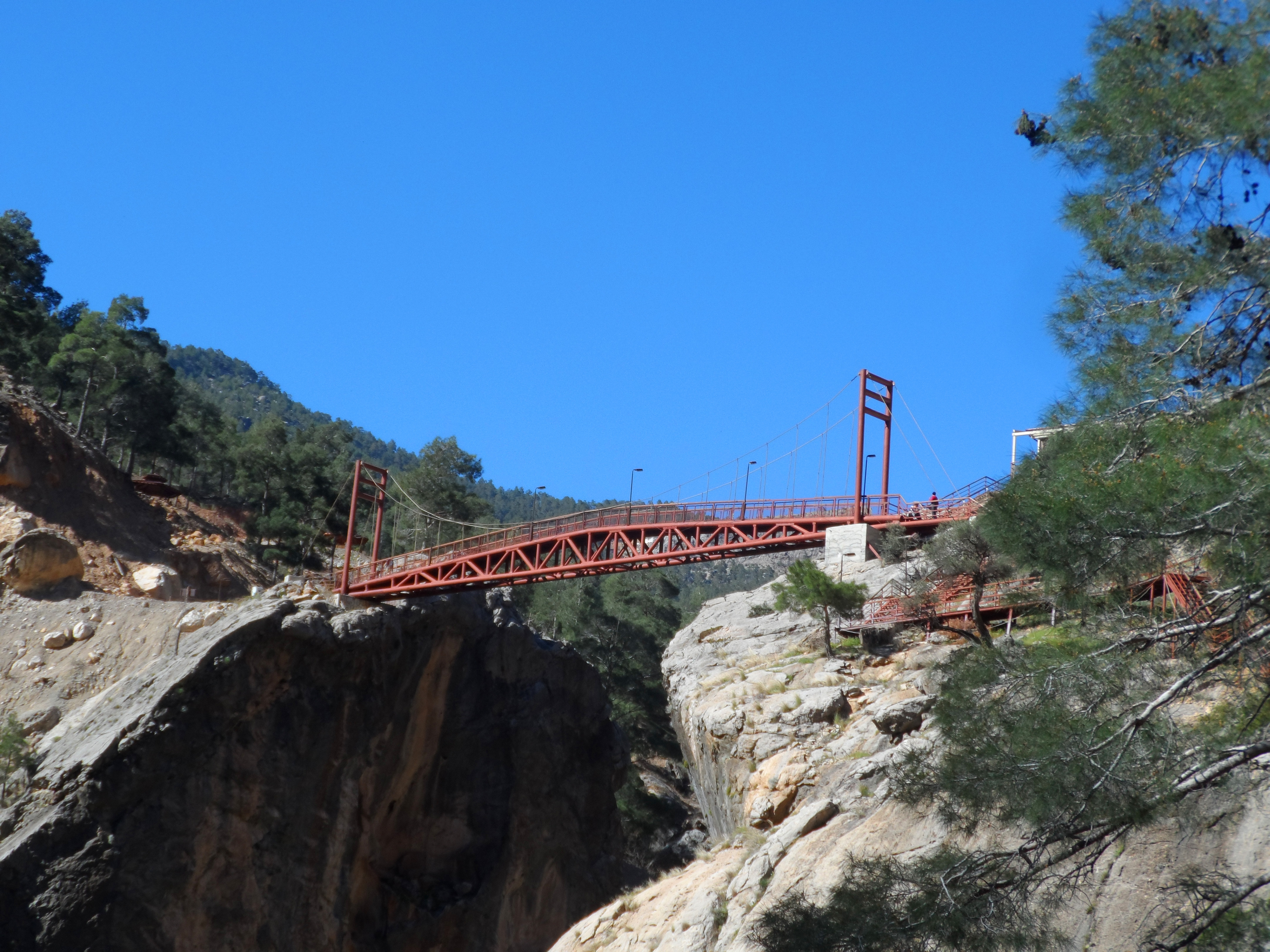
Yerköprü Bridge

== See also ==
- List of waterfalls
- List of waterfalls in Turkey
