= Manavgat Waterfall =

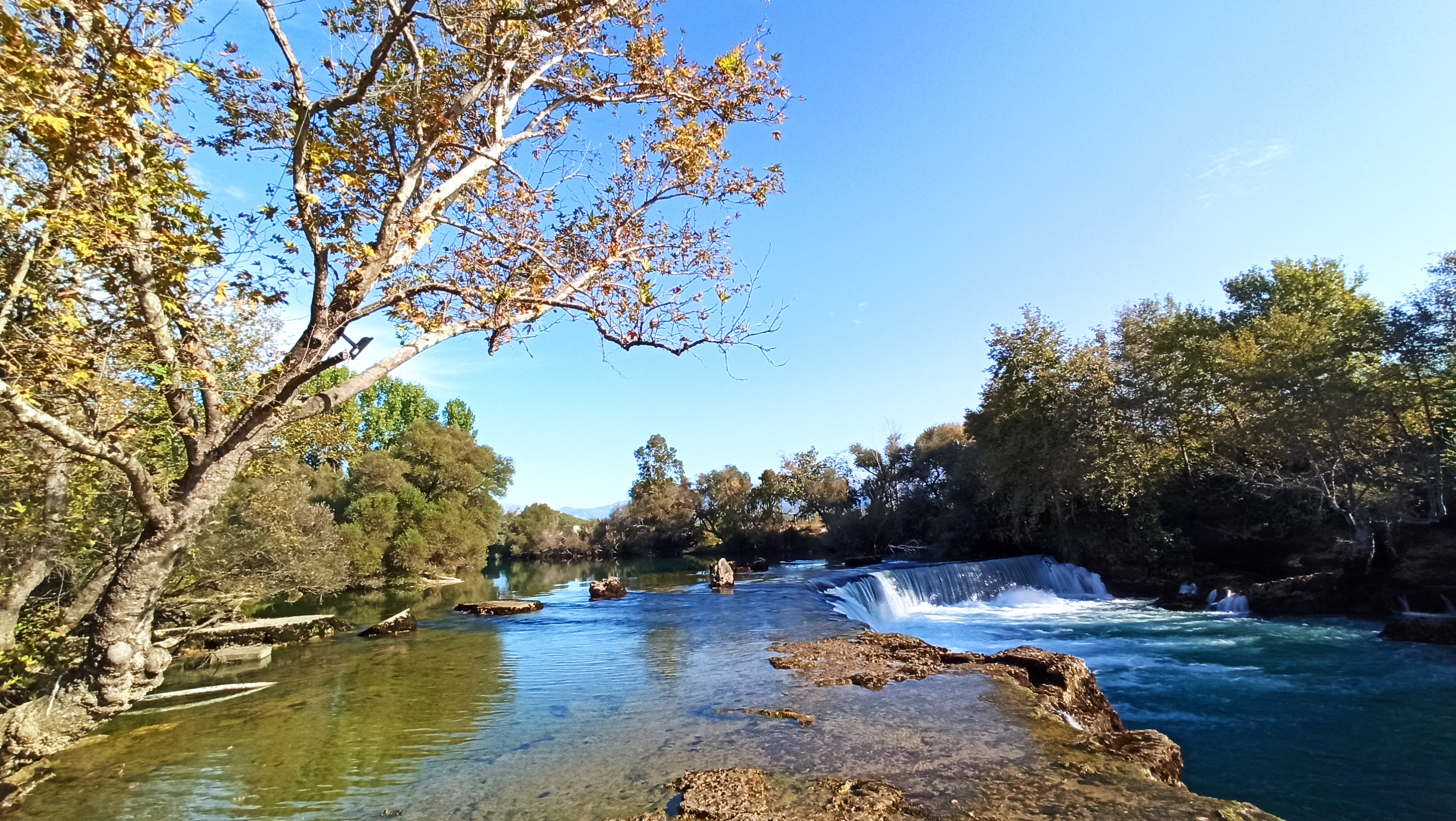

- Location within Turkey
- Location: Side, Turkey, Manavgat, Turkey
- Coordinates: 36°48′49″N 31°27′16″E
- Type: Waterfall

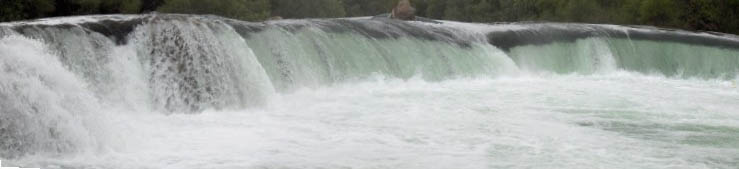
Manavgat Falls.

Manavgat Waterfall on the Manavgat River is near the city of Side, 3 km (2 mi) north of Manavgat, Turkey. Its high flow over a wide area as it falls from a low height is best viewed from a high altitude.

The white, foaming water of the Manavgat Waterfalls flows powerfully over the rocks. Near the waterfalls are shady tea gardens that provide a resting place.

The Oymapinar Dam is located 12 km (7 mi) to the north of the river.

During floods, the Manavgat Falls may disappear under high water.

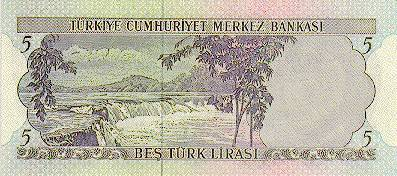
Reverse of the 5 lira banknote (1968-1983)

The waterfall was depicted on the reverse of the Turkish 5 lira banknotes of 1968–1983.

== Transport ==
Manavgat Waterfall is situated approximately 3 km (1.9 mi) north of Manavgat town center and about 75 km (47 mi) east of Antalya. Road transport from Antalya and nearby coastal settlements such as Side is provided via the D.400 state road to Manavgat. From the district center, local minibuses (dolmuş) operate regularly to the waterfall.

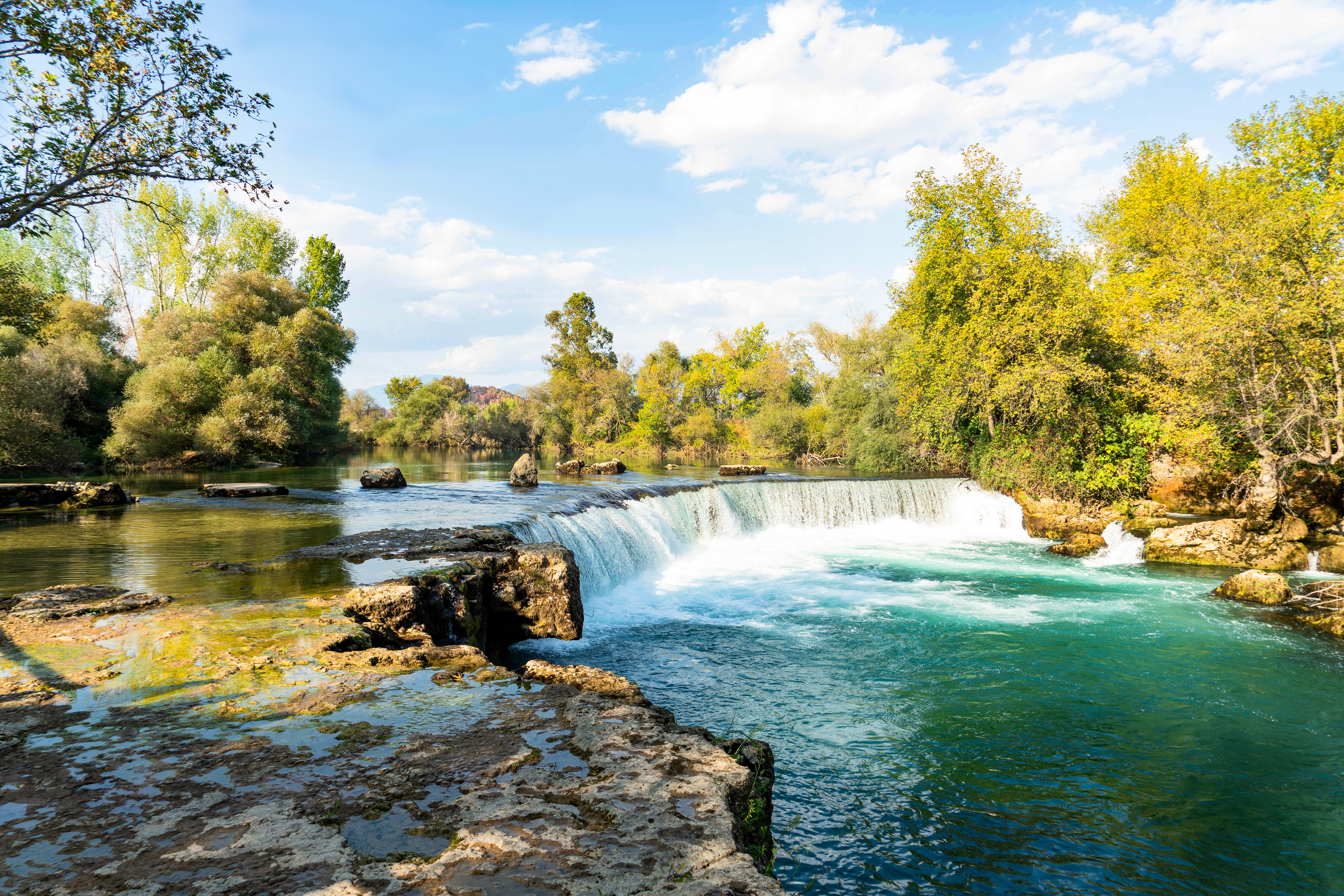
Manavgat Falls.

== See also ==
- List of waterfalls
- List of waterfalls in Turkey
