= Göksu Waterfall =

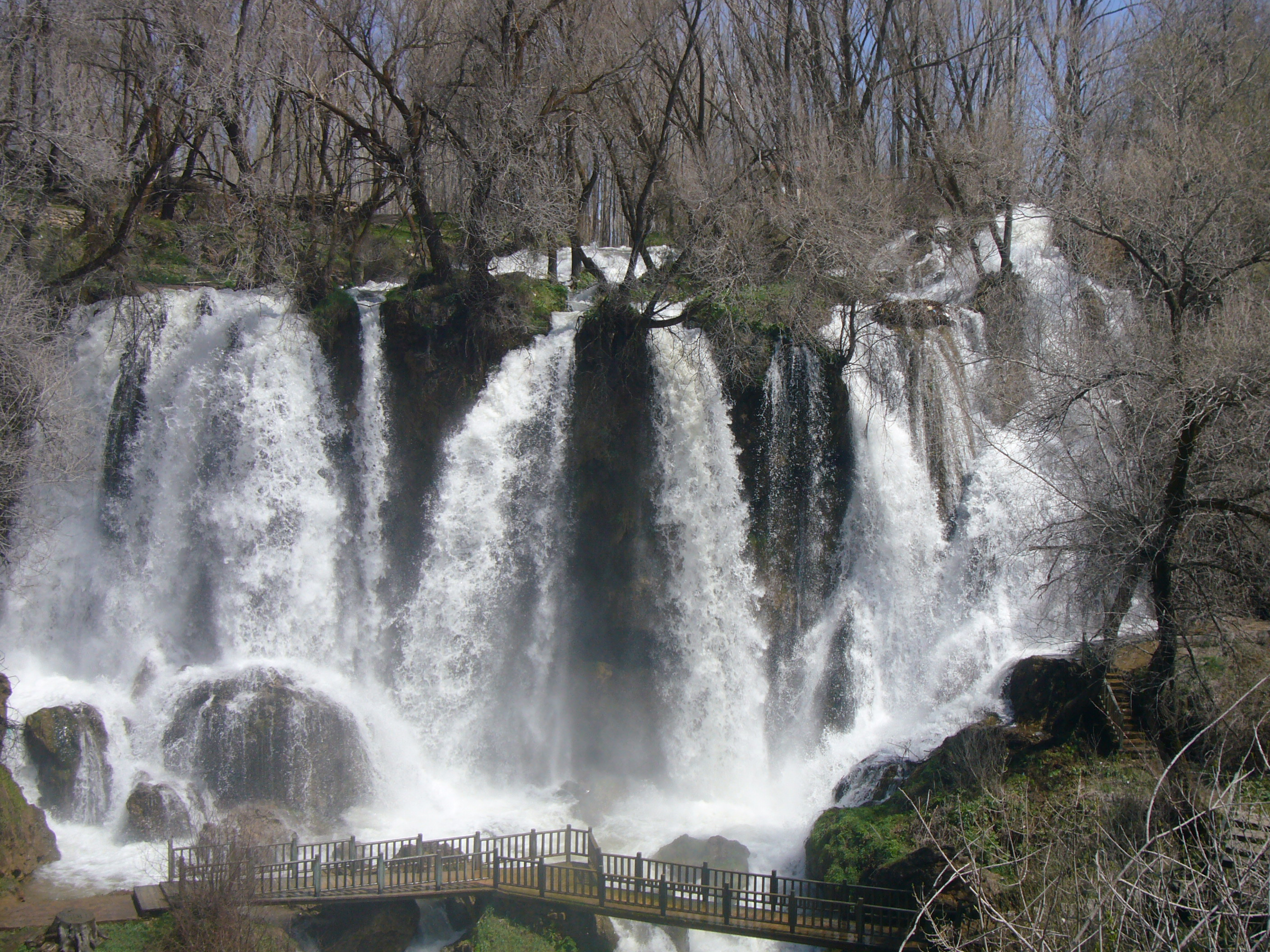
- Interactive map of Göksu Waterfall
- Coordinates: 39°18′21″N 35°56′48″E
- Total height: 20 m (66 ft)

The Göksu waterfall is located on the Göksu, a tributary of the Kızılırmak River, near the large village of Sızır in the vicinity of Gemerek in the Turkish province of Sivas. A hydroelectric plant was erected on the Göksu river in the 1980s by the General Directorate of the Iller Bank in order to supply the city of Kayseri with electricity, but was later attached to the national grid. This diverted water away from the Göksu waterfall until a project to restore the area was completed in 2008.

Amenities near the waterfall were closed briefly in 2020 due to the COVID-19 pandemic in Turkey, opening up again in early 2021.

== See also ==
- List of waterfalls
- List of waterfalls in Turkey
