= Ohtamış =

- Neighbourhood
- Location in Turkey
- Coordinates: 40°49′5″N 37°39′47″E
- Country: Turkey
- Province: Ordu
- District: Ulubey
- Elevation: 602 m (1,975 ft)
- Population (2022): 834
- Time zone: UTC+3 (TRT)
- Postal code: 52850
- Area code: 0452

Ohtamış is a neighbourhood of the municipality and district of Ulubey, Ordu Province, Turkey. Its population is 834 (2022). The village is approximately 21 km south of the Black Sea.

The Ohtamış Waterfall is located near Ohtamış.
