= Güney Waterfall =

Güney Waterfall Güney Şelalesi
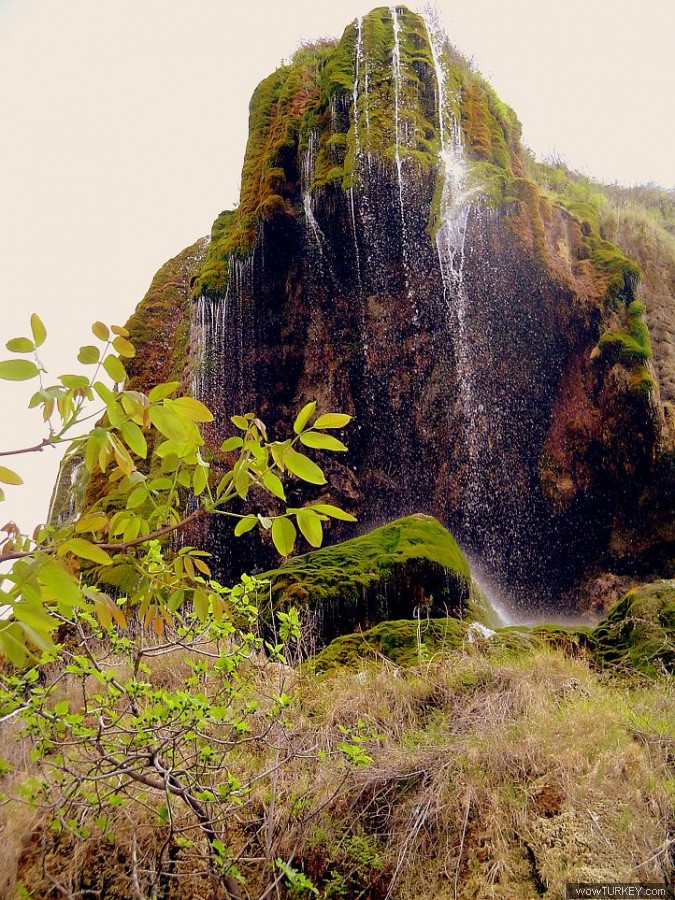
- Güney Waterfall (April 2007)

- Location within Turkey
- Location: Denizli Province, Turkey
- Coordinates: 38°07′12″N 29°03′36″E
- Total height: 20 m (66 ft)

Güney Waterfall (Turkish: Güney Şelalesi) is a waterfall in Denizli Province, western Turkey. It is a registered natural monument of the country.

== Location and access ==
The waterfall is located in the Cindere village of the Güney district of Denizli Province. It is 70 km (43 mi) distant from Denizli and 3 km (1.9 mi) from Güney. The road to the waterfall is paved with cobblestones.

== Waterfall ==
The waterfall is fed by waters of a spring dropping from a height of 20 m (66 ft), which joins the Büyük Menderes River. The carbonated water dissolved limestone formation rocks and formed travertines on the waterfall base. A cave situated under the waterfall contains a pond.

It is a popular visitor attraction. Around 20,000 local and foreign tourists visit the site annually.

Used as a local recreational area since the 1960s, the waterfall and its surroundings, which cover an area of 4.98 da (536 sq ft), was registered in 1994 as a natural monument by the Nature Reserve and Nature Parks Administration of the Ministry of Forest and Water Management.

In the summer of 2007, the waterfall faced the risk of disappearance due to drought in the region. To overcome the threat, water was brought by pipeline over a distance of 600 m (2,000 ft). The 20 m (66 ft)-high rock wall of the waterfall collapsed following a landslide, which occurred in the afternoon of May 13, 2013. As a result of the rockfall, the waterfall almost disappeared. One person at the site sustained light injuries. In April 2014 workers diverted the stream and reestablished the waterfall about 50 m (160 ft) to the side of the waterfall's initial location. Facilities were added to the site for outdoor recreation. The waterfall area was also illuminated to accommodate nighttime visitors.

== See also ==
- List of waterfalls
- List of waterfalls in Turkey
