= Manavgat Dam =

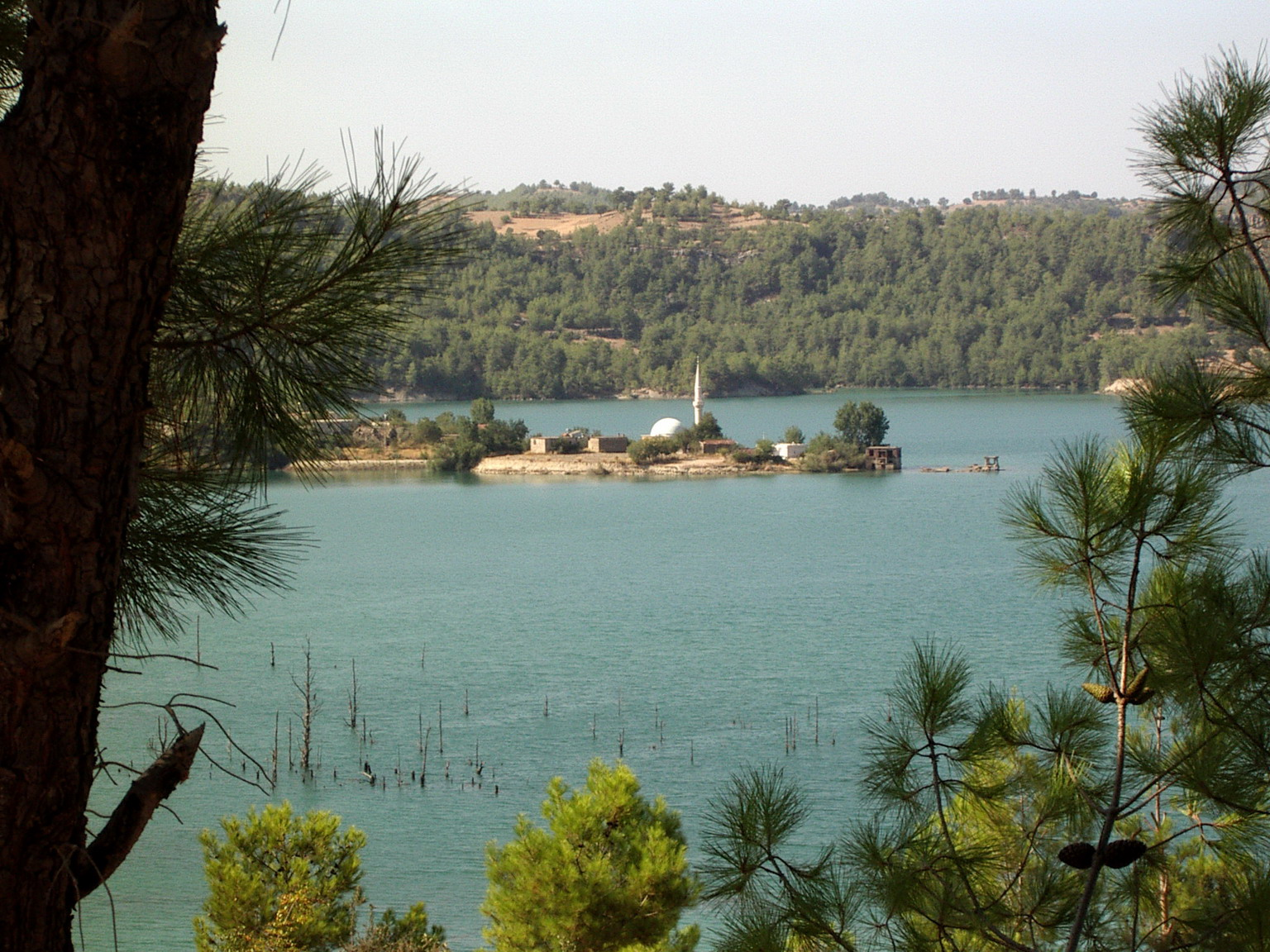
- Interactive map of Manavgat Dam
- Location: Turkey
- Coordinates: 36°50′12.80″N 31°30′57.36″E

Manavgat Dam is a dam in Turkey. The development was backed by the Turkish State Hydraulic Works.

== See also ==
- List of dams and reservoirs in Turkey
- Manavgat Dam is a dam in Turkey. The development was backed by the Turkish State Hydraulic Works.

== Water Level and Hydrological Status ==
The active occupancy rate and reservoir water levels of Manavgat Dam are monitored daily via data from the State Hydraulic Works (DSİ) hydrometric stations and the Energy Exchange Istanbul (EPİAŞ) transparency platform.

Tasked with regulating peak water discharges released for power generation from the Oymapınar Dam located upstream, the reservoir exhibits varying occupancy levels throughout the year depending on basin precipitation regimes and seasonal water consumption. As of November 2026, the dam's active occupancy rate was recorded between 86.8% and 88.7%, maintaining a high-capacity and secure water reserve level.

== See also ==
- List of dams and reservoirs in Turkey
