= Gürlevik Waterfalls =

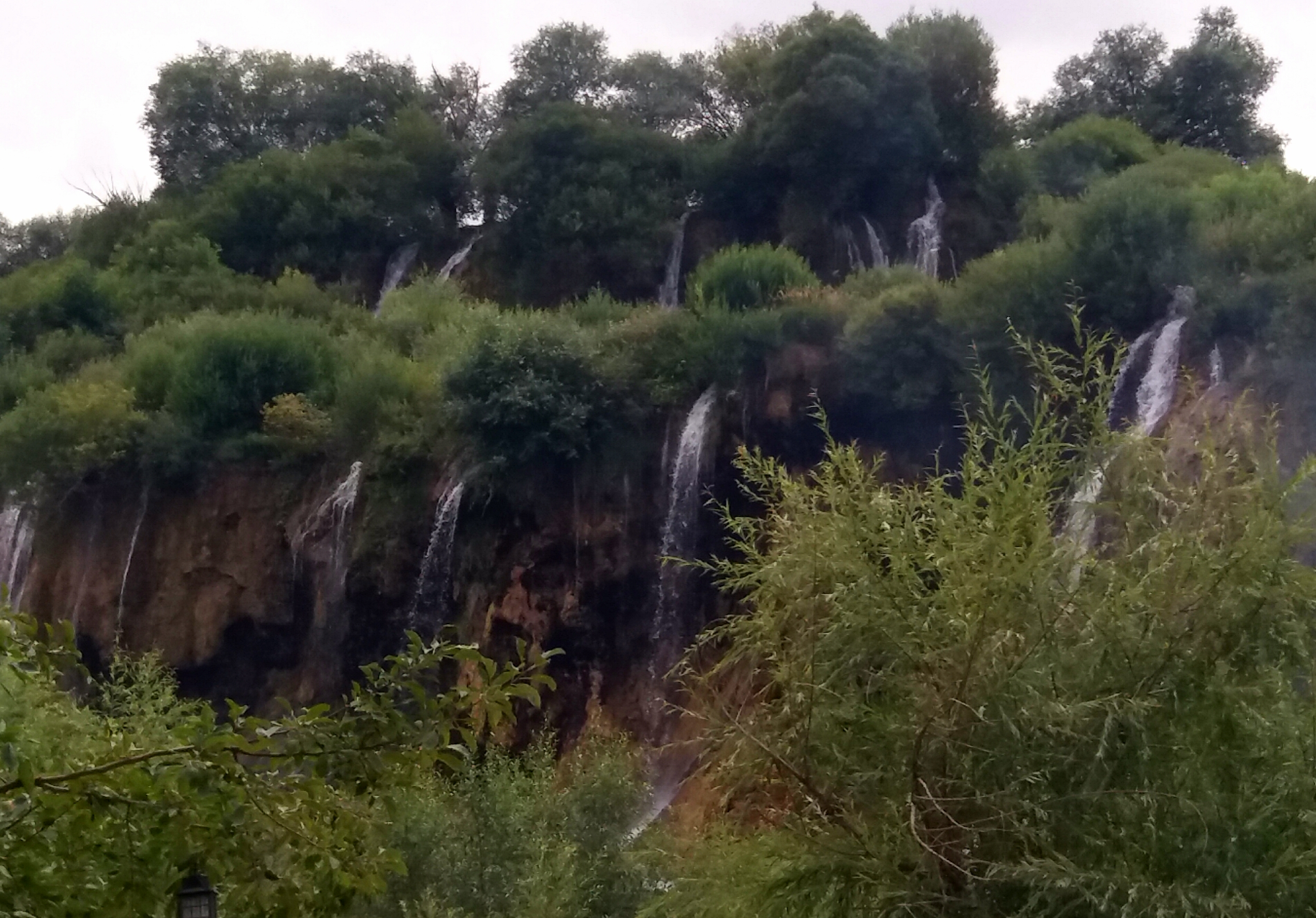
- Interactive map of Gürlevik Waterfalls
- Coordinates: 39.59°N 39.73°E

Girlevik Waterfalls are situated 29 km south-east of Erzincan in Turkey. In the years 1950–1953, the State Hydraulic Works (DSI) built a hydroelectric power plant at its lower section of 3,040 KW. When the third group was added in 1965, the water capacity of the Gürlevik power station rose to 3*866 1/sec. The Gürlevik waters fall from a travertine platform in a disorderly fashion.

== See also ==
- List of waterfalls
- List of waterfalls in Turkey
