= Tarsus Waterfall =

Coordinates: 36°57′22″N 34°53′35″E

Location of Tarsus Waterfall

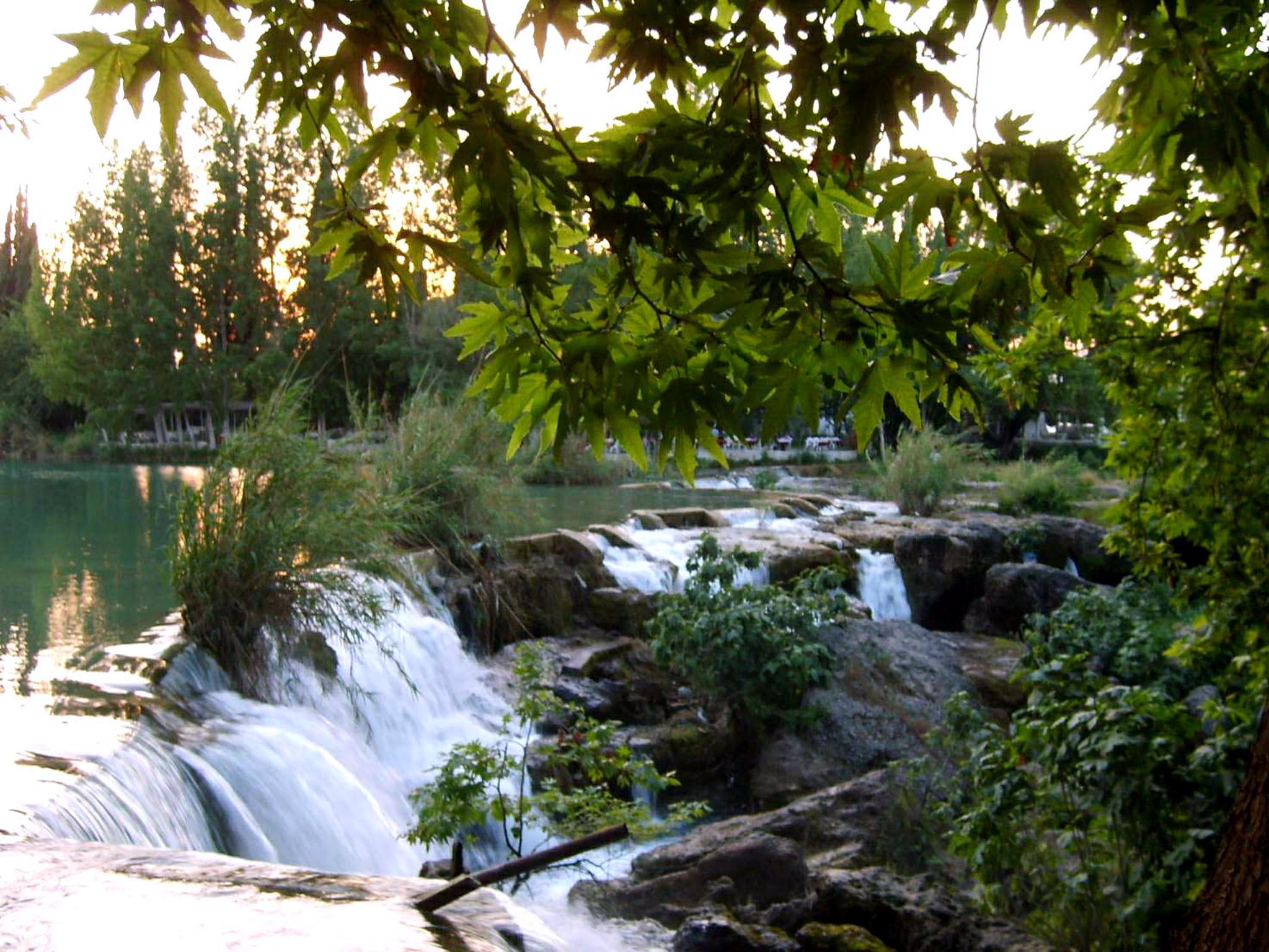
Tarsus waterfall

Tarsus Waterfall is located on the northern outskirts of the city of Tarsus, not far from the motorway O.51, in southern Turkey.

Since the construction of the Berdan Dam, the water of the Tarsus River has been distributed in canals for irrigation, with the result that the waterfall can now be seen only in seasons of very heavy rainfall.

== See also ==
- List of waterfalls
- List of waterfalls in Turkey
