= Güvenköy =

- Neighbourhood
- Location in Turkey
- Coordinates: 40°50′N 37°49′E
- Country: Turkey
- Province: Ordu
- District: Ulubey
- Population (2022): 153
- Time zone: UTC+3 (TRT)

Güvenköy is a neighbourhood of the municipality and district of Ulubey, Ordu Province, Turkey. Its population is 153 (2022). The area is home to a high degree of hazelnut cultivation.
