= Manavgat River =

Coordinates: 36°43′N 31°28′E

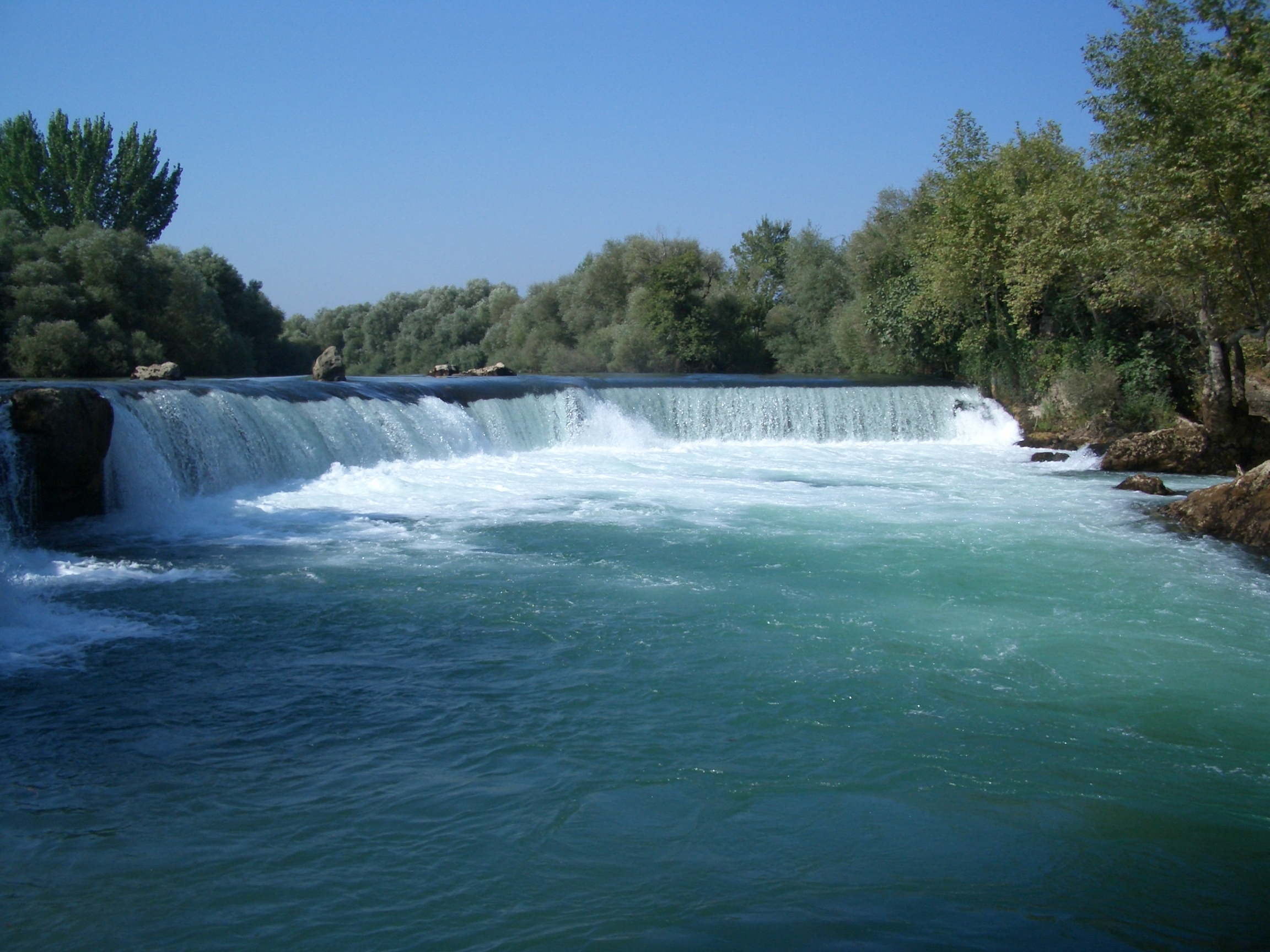
- Manavgat River flowing over the Manavgat Waterfall

- Location within Turkey

Location
- Country: Turkey

Physical characteristics
- Mouth
  - elevation: 1,350 m (4,430 ft)

Manavgat River originates on the eastern slopes of Western Taurus Mountains in Turkey. At an elevation of 1,350 m, the outflow of several small springs joins together to become the headwaters of the Manavgat. The largest of these springs is called Dumanli, whose name means "place where there is fog", because of the dense mist that forms above the spring. In addition to the springs from the Taurus Mountains, the Manavgat is also fed underground from large lakes to the north of the mountains, on the Anatolian Plateau. From there, the river flows south over conglomerated strata for about 90 km, descending through a series of canyons. Finally, it washes over the Manavgat Waterfall and through the coastal plain and into the Mediterranean Sea.

In ancient times, the river was called Melas (Ancient Greek: Μέλας). Pliny the Elder considered it the boundary between ancient Pamphylia and Cilicia.

The maximum flow of the Manavgat River is 500 m³/second, with an average of 147 m³/second. Using the average flow as a measure, the Manavgat River accounts for a very small amount of the water flowing into the Mediterranean. There are two dams over the river: Oymapınar Dam and the Manavgat Dam. Studies have shown that water drains into the Manavgat River basin from its surface watershed and also from endorheic basins, especially those to the east of the river. There are many caves in the river watershed area, the most interesting being the Altınbeşik Cave.

In 1992, the Turkish State Hydraulics Work (DSI) was given the job of developing a water supply project for domestic use from the Manavgat river.

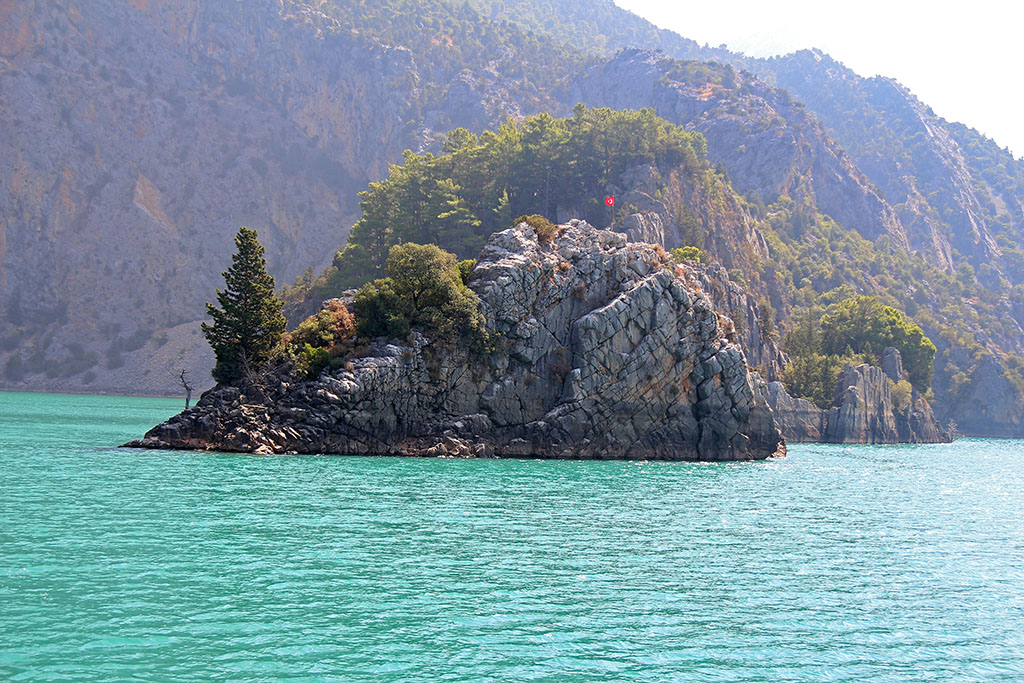
Oymapinar reservoir

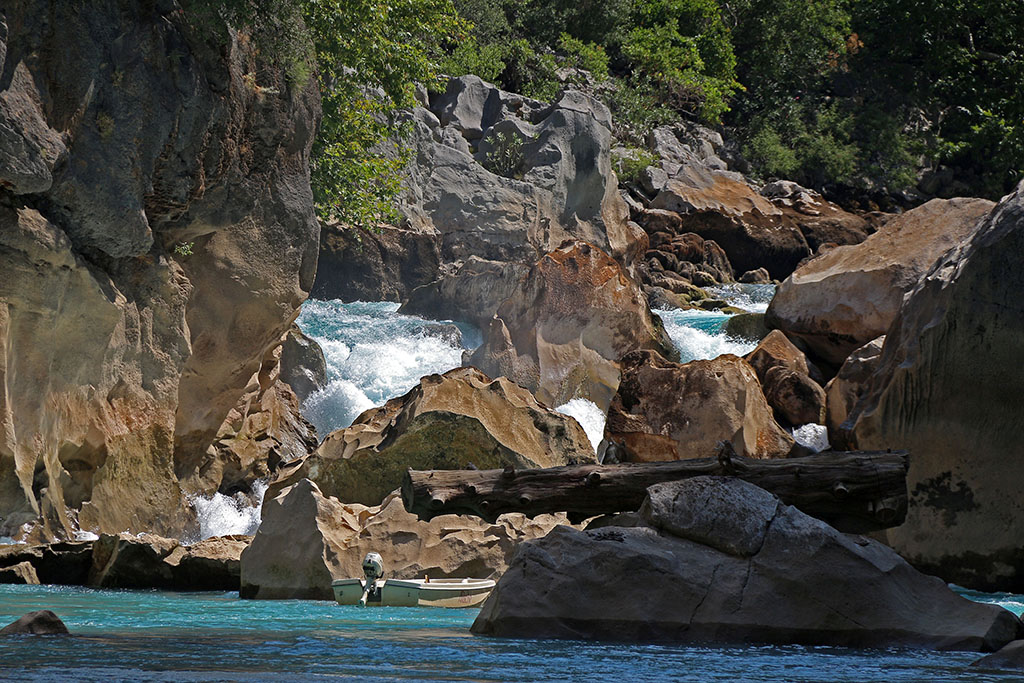
Oymapinar reservoir of Manavgat

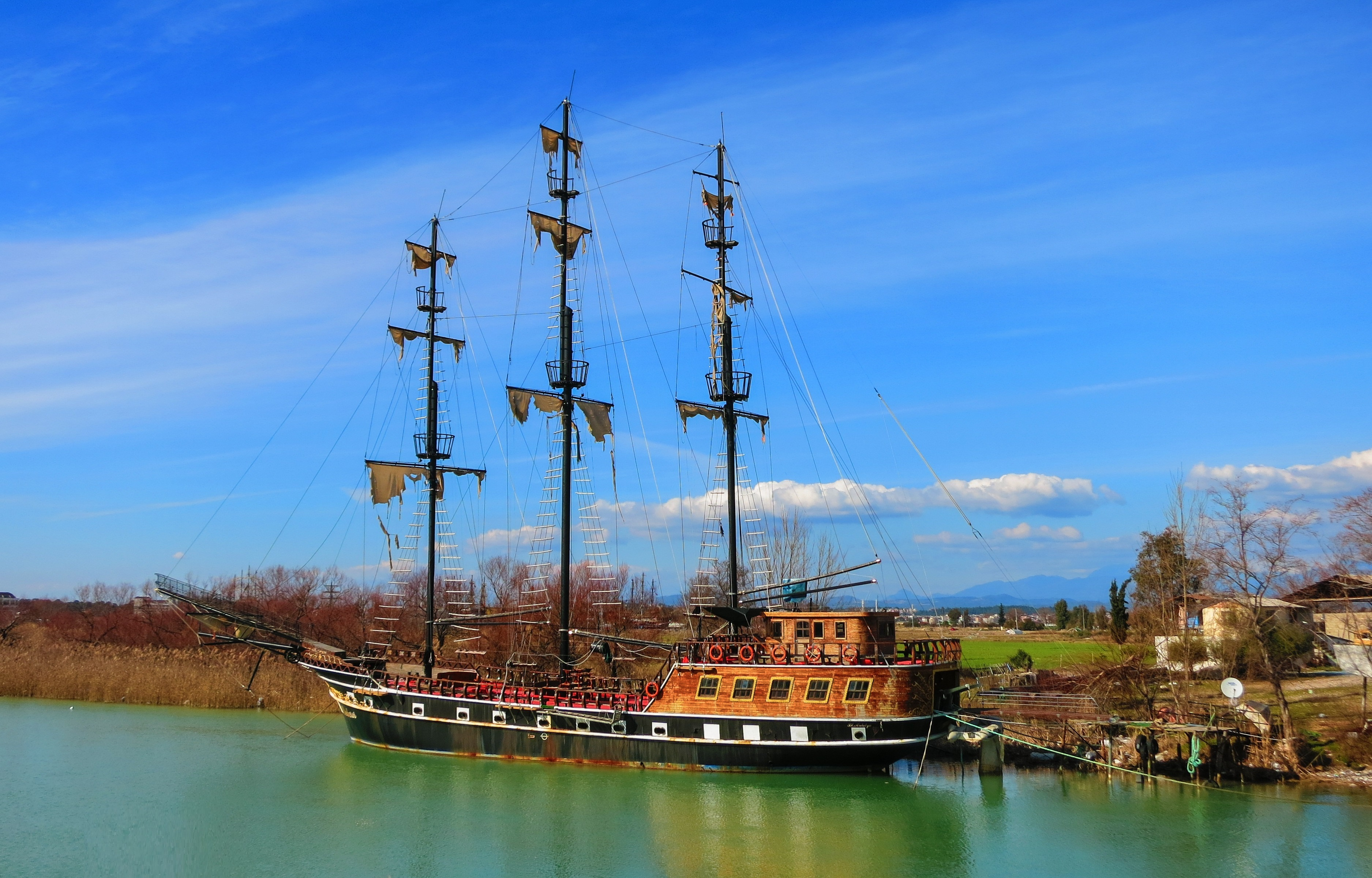
Traditional cruise ships for Manavgat

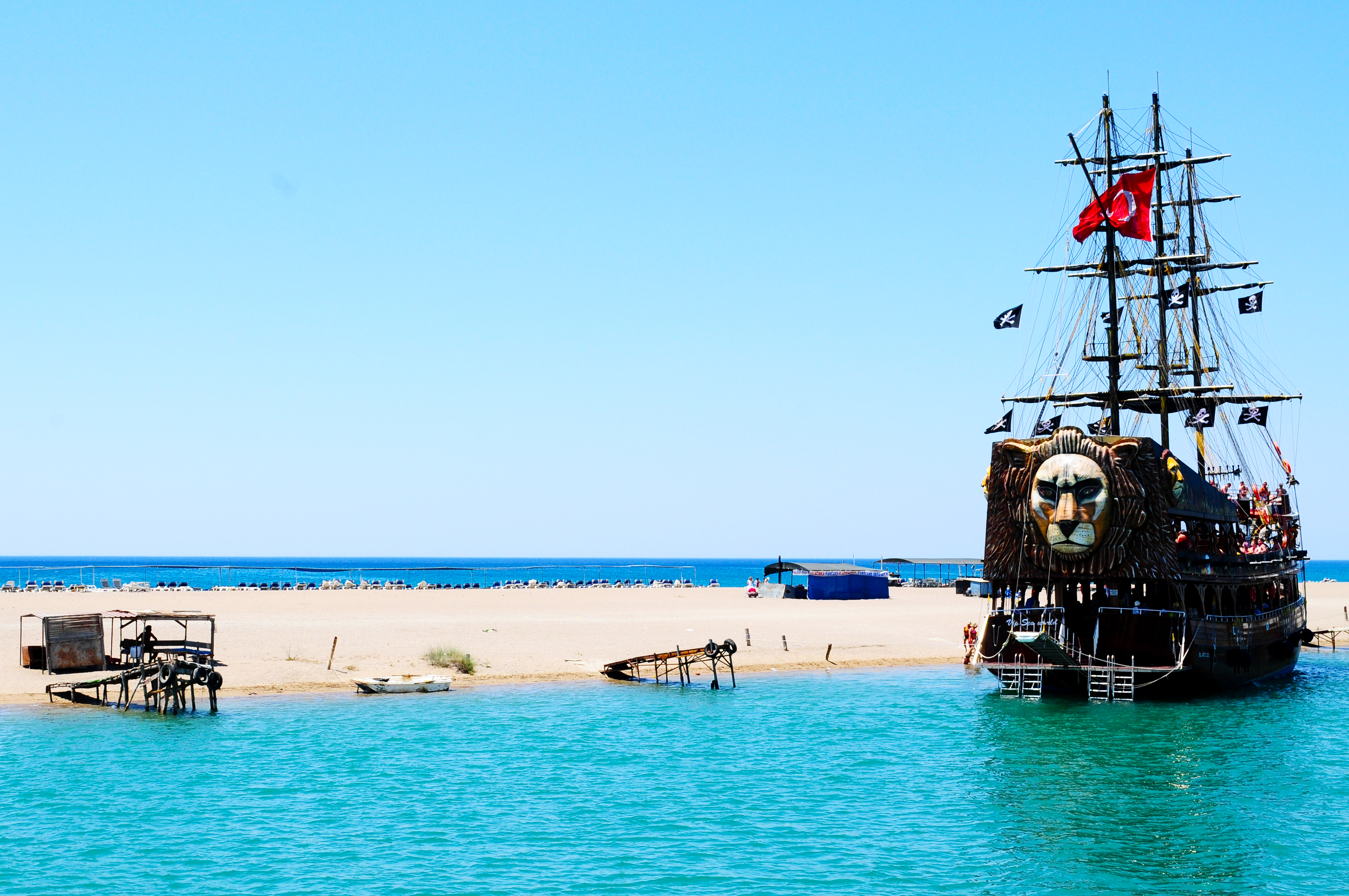
Cruise ships for Manavgat

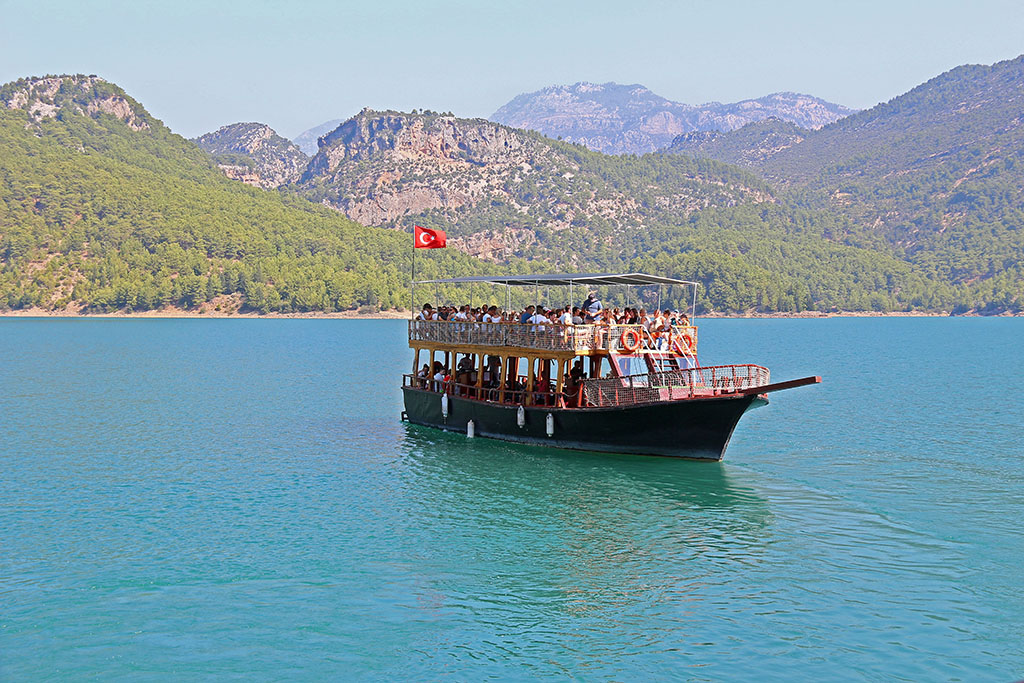

== See also ==
- Manavgat Waterfall
