= Ulubey, Ordu =

Ulubey
- District and municipality
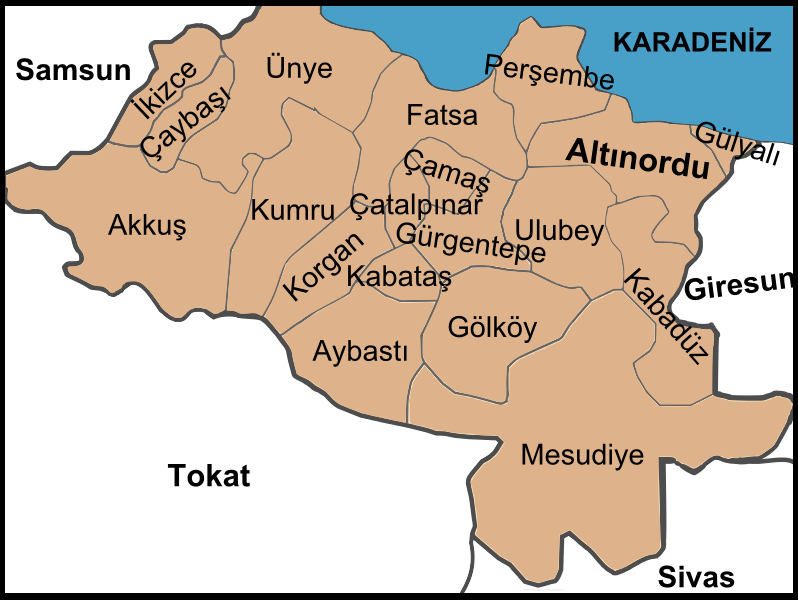
- Map showing Ulubey District in Ordu Province

- Location within Turkey
- Coordinates: 40°52′34″N 37°44′26″E
- Country: Turkey
- Province: Ordu

Government
  - Mayor: İsa Türkcan (AKP)
- Area: 295 km^{2} (114 sq mi)
- Elevation: 602 m (1,975 ft)
- Population (2022): 16,976
  - Density: 57.5/km^{2} (149/sq mi)
- Time zone: UTC+3 (TRT)
- Postal code: 52850
- Area code: 0452
- Climate: Cfb
- Website: www.ulubey.bel.tr

Ulubey is a municipality and district of Ordu Province, Turkey. Its area is 295 km^{2}, and its population is 16,976 (2022). The town lies at an elevation of 602 m (1,975 ft).

== Economy ==
The economy of the district depends mainly on agriculture. Hazelnuts, beekeeping, dairy farming, corn, and kale are the main products. In recent decades the population has declined as people have migrated away to jobs in Turkey's larger cities or abroad, now mainly their grandparents remain.

== Composition ==
There are 41 neighbourhoods in Ulubey District:

- Akoluk
- Akpınar
- Aydınlar
- Başçardak
- Belenyurt
- Çağlayan
- Çatallı
- Cevizlik
- Çubuklu
- Çukur
- Doğlu
- Durakköy
- Elmaçukuru
- Eymür
- Fındıklı
- Gündüzlü
- Güvenköy
- Güvenyurt
- Güzelyurt
- Hocaoğlu
- Kadıncık
- Kalıcak
- Karakoca
- Kardeşler
- Kıranyağmur
- Kirazlık
- Koşaca
- Kumanlar
- Kumrulu
- Ohtamış
- Örenköy
- Oyumgürgen
- Refahiye
- Şahinkaya
- Şekeroluk
- Şeyhler
- Uzunmahmut
- Yenimahalle
- Yenisayaca
- Yolbaşı
- Yukarıkızılin
