= Oymapinar Dam =

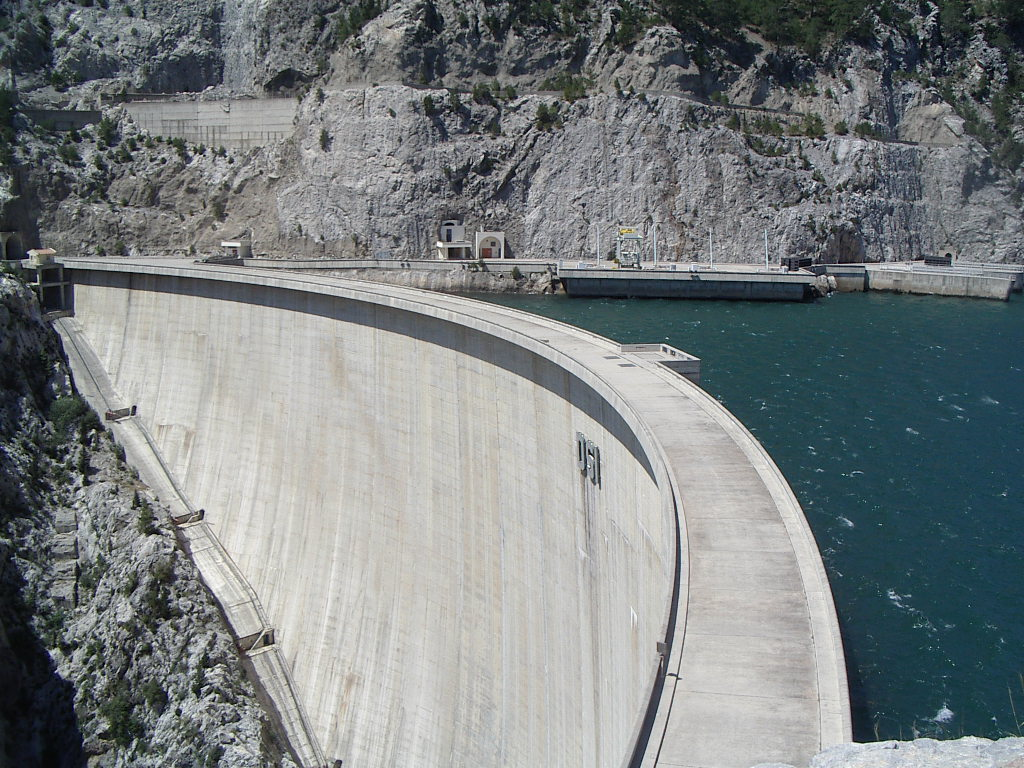
- Interactive map of Oymapinar Dam
- Location: Antalya Province, Turkey
- Coordinates: 36°54′31.06″N 31°31′54.10″E
- Opening date: 1984

Dam and spillways
- Impounds: Manavgat River
- Height: 185 m

Reservoir
- Total capacity: 676 000 m³
- Surface area: 4.7 km²

Oymapinar Dam is an arch dam built on the Manavgat river in Turkey in 1984. It is an arch dam in design, 185 m in height, built to generate hydroelectric power.

Oymapınar Dam is located 12 km north of Manavgat Waterfall. It is an artificial, freshwater dam with a capacity of 300 million cubic meters. It is 23 km upstream of Manavgat town 40 km east of city of Antalya in southern Turkey and located on the Manavgat River which runs into the Mediterranean.

== Description ==
The dam has four underground turbines with a total capacity of 540 megawatts. When built in 1984 it was the third largest dam in Turkey. As more dams have been built, it is the fifth largest.

Because of the arch design, the force of water pushing against the dam compacts the dam and strengthens it. The weight of the dam structure pushes it down firmly into the underlying rock. This design is ideal for dams built in rocky narrow gorges.

== Construction ==
The dam was designed in the USSR and built by Bilfinger Berger and completed in 1984.

== Technical data ==
- Purpose - Energy
- Embankment type - Concrete arch
- Storage volume - 300 million m^{3}
- Crest length - 454 m
- Spillway - 2,800 m^{3}/s
- Bottomoutlet - 350 m^{3}/s
- Power - 540 MW
- Annual production - 1620 GWh/year

== See also ==
- Tilkiler Cave

== Gallery ==
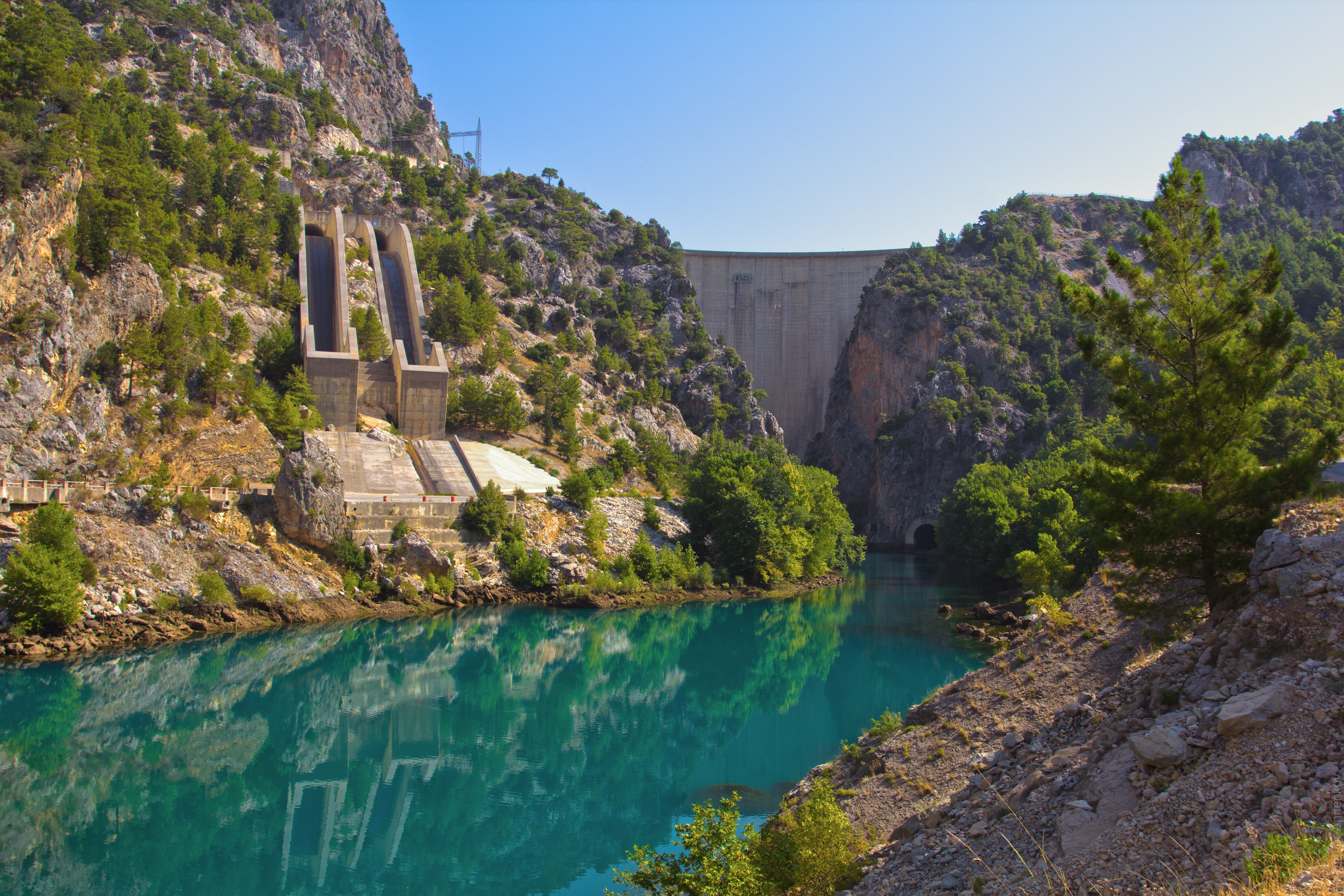
Oymapinar Dam seen from below.

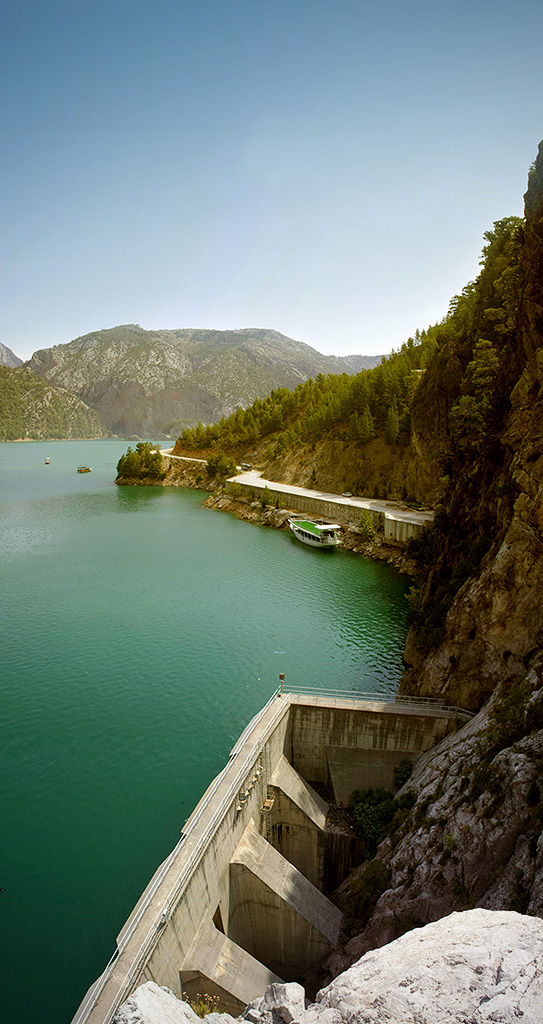
Oymapinar Dam.

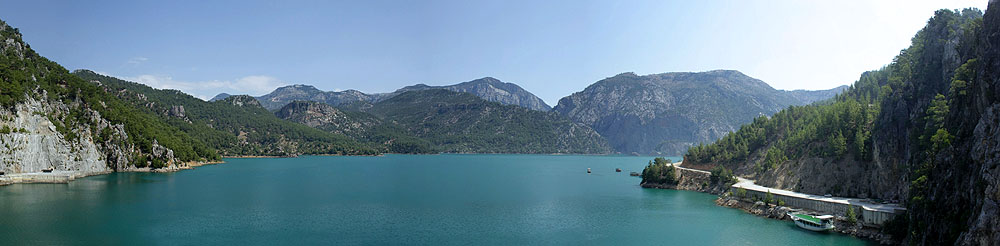
Oymapinar Dam.
