= Yerköprü Waterfall (Konya) =

Yerköprü Waterfall Yerköprü Şelalesi
- Location within Turkey
- Location: Hadim, Konya Province, Turkey
- Coordinates: 37°01′43″N 32°41′53″E
- Total height: 20 m (66 ft)
- Watercourse: Göksu River

Yerköprü Waterfall (Turkish: Yerköprü Şelalesi) is a waterfall in Konya Province, central Turkey.

The waterfall is located at Habiller village in Hadim district of Konya Province, about 110 km (68 mi) south of Konya. It is at a distance of 72 km (45 mi) from the neighboring city Karaman.

It is formed at a place, where the river was blocked by earth from the slopes of the river valley due to landslide. Spring water named Karasu, which outcropped from the valley slope, overspread on the landslide earth mass and formed a layer of travertine. In the long run, the stream submerged under the natural barrage and formed an underground water tunnel, which is a cave of about 500 m (1,600 ft). Karasu spring water joins Göksu River here. The cave contains stalactites and stalagmites inside. The waterfall is on the Göksu River, and drops from the travertines to the river bed in a height of 20 m (66 ft).

The cave and the waterfall are named after the place "Yerköprü", which means literally "ground bridge".

It is a popular tourist attraction. The site has paved walkways, shelters with outdoor furniture for picnic and a car parking lot. The waterfall can be best observed in a bird's eye view from the nearby Çakallar village, which is situated at an elevation of 1,000 m (3,300 ft),.

== See also ==
- List of waterfalls
- List of waterfalls in Turkey
