= Gezende Dam =

Coordinates: 36.534°N 33.1906°E

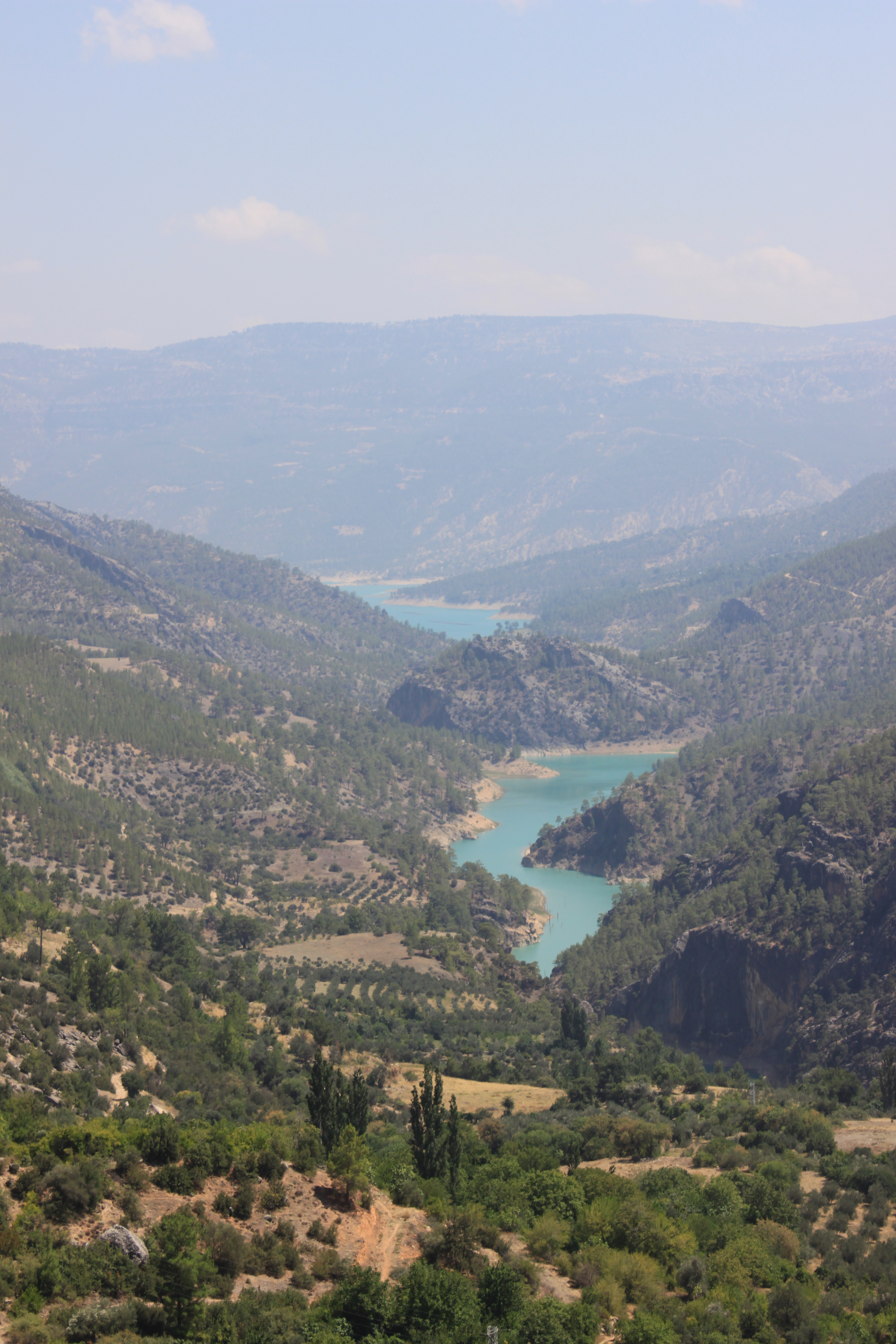
- Gezende reservoir near Evsin, view to the southeast
- Location: Turkey
- Construction began: 1979
- Opening date: 1990

Dam and spillways
- Type of dam: Concrete arch
- Impounds: Ermenek River
- Height: 75 m (246 ft)

Reservoir
- Total capacity: 92,000,000 m^{3} (74,586 acre⋅ft)

Power Station
- Installed capacity: 159 MW
- Annual generation: 528 GWh

Gezende Dam is an arch dam on the Ermenek River in Mersin Province, Turkey. The development was backed by the Turkish State Hydraulic Works.

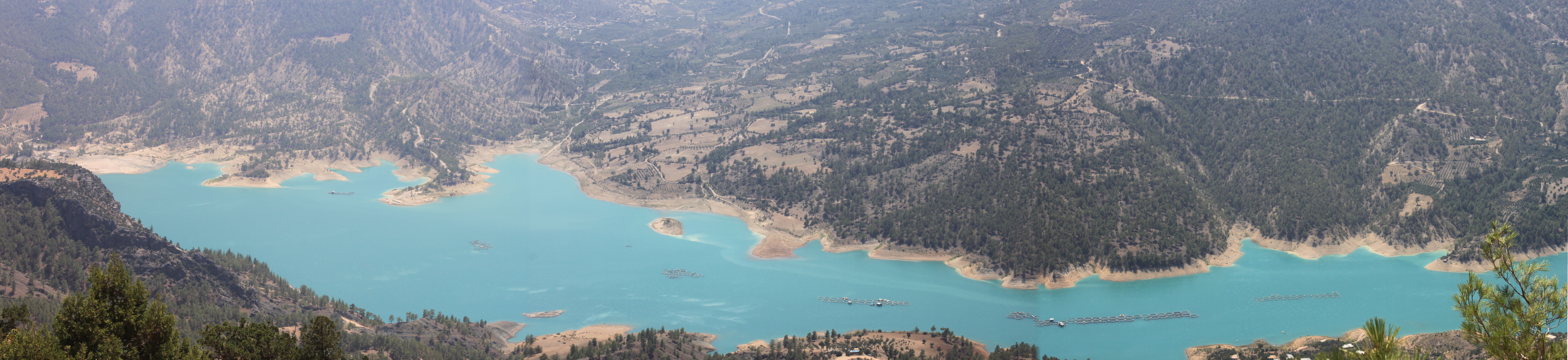
Gezende reservoir near Evsin, view to the south.

== See also ==
- List of dams and reservoirs in Turkey
