= Gürleyik Waterfall =

Waterfall in Turkey

Gürleyik Waterfall (Turkish: Gürleyik Çağlayanı) is a waterfall at Gürleyik village of Mihalıcçık ilçe (district) in Eskişehir Province, Turkey. A campsite and picnic area are also situated around the waterfall.

The picnic area is located at 39°59′17″N 31°20′27″E to the south of the village with the same name. Its distance to Mihalıcçık is 27 kilometres (17 mi) and to Eskişehir is 118 kilometres (73 mi). Visitors from Ankara follow the Turkish state highway D-140 and the local road to the south. The admission fee is ₺ 10. Visitors can swim in the pond of the waterfall.

== See also ==
- List of waterfalls
- List of waterfalls in Turkey
