= Erfelek Dam =

Coordinates: 41°52′04″N 34°46′36″E

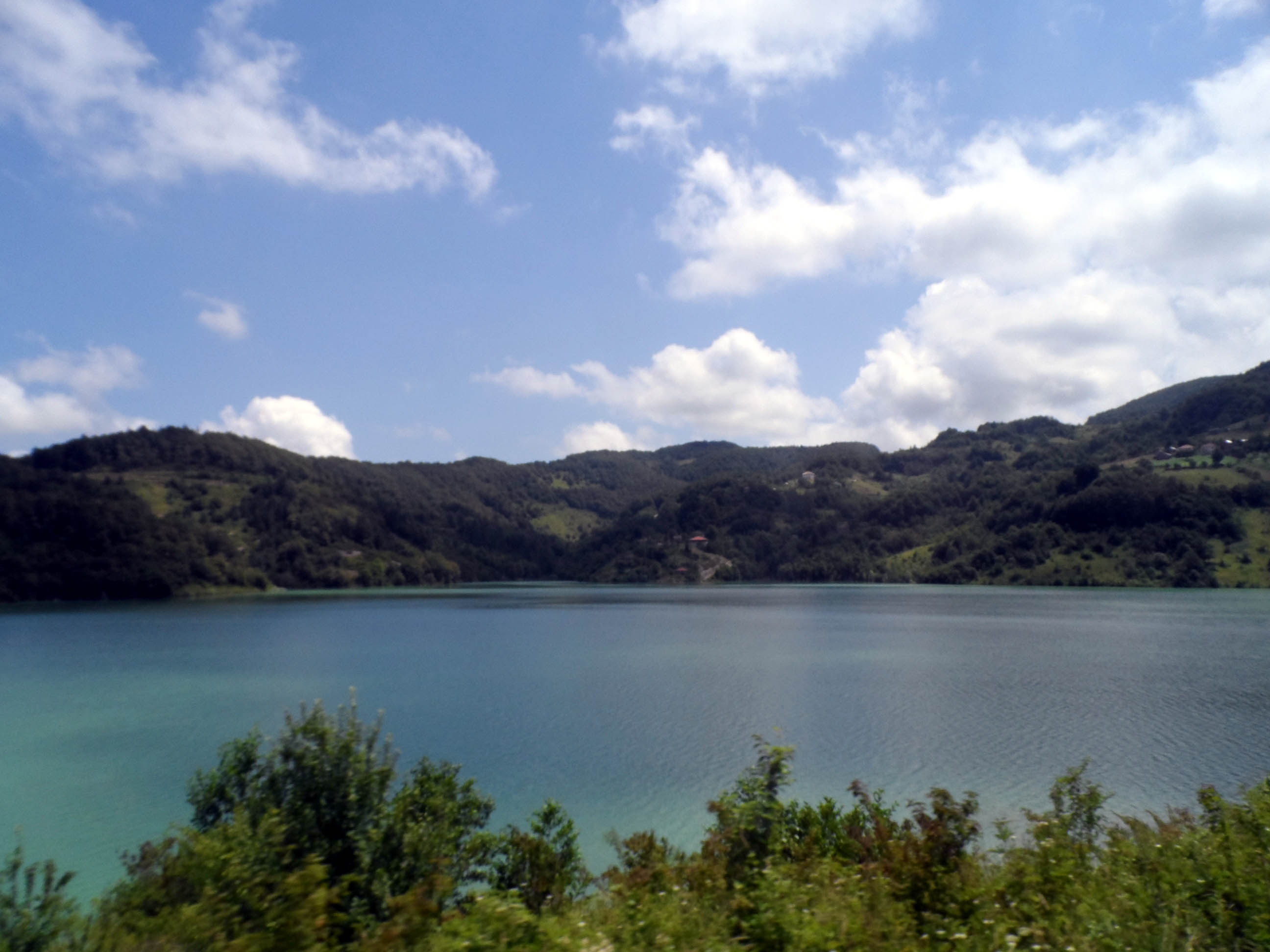
- Erfelek Dam from the west
- Interactive map of Erfelek Dam
- Location: Turkey
- Construction began: 1995
- Opening date: 2004

Erfelek Dam is a dam in Sinop Province, Turkey, built between 1995 and 2004. The development was backed by the Turkish State Hydraulic Works.

== See also ==
- List of dams and reservoirs in Turkey
